= List of moths of North America (MONA 4618–5509) =

North American moths represent about 12,000 types of moths. In comparison, there are about 825 species of North American butterflies. The moths (mostly nocturnal) and butterflies (mostly diurnal) together make up the taxonomic order Lepidoptera.

This list is sorted by MONA number (MONA is short for Moths of America North of Mexico). A numbering system for North American moths introduced by Ronald W. Hodges, et al. in 1983 in the publication Check List of the Lepidoptera of America North of Mexico. The list has since been updated, but the placement in families is outdated for some species.

This list covers America north of Mexico (effectively the continental United States and Canada). For a list of moths and butterflies recorded from the state of Hawaii, see List of Lepidoptera of Hawaii.

This is a partial list, covering moths with MONA numbers ranging from 4618 to 5509. For the rest of the list, see List of moths of North America.

== Zygaenidae ==
- 4618 – Harrisina aversa
- 4619 – Harrisina cyanea
- 4620 – Harrisina lustrans
- 4621 – Harrisina brillians
- 4622 – Harrisina coracina
- 4623 – Harrisina metallica, western grapeleaf skeletonizer moth
- 4624 – Harrisina americana, grapeleaf skeletonizer moth
- 4625 – Neoalbertia basirei
- 4626 – Neoalbertia constans
- 4626.1 – Neoalbertia rata
- 4627 – Acoloithus rectarius, upright acoloithus moth
- 4628 – Acoloithus novaricus
- 4629 – Acoloithus falsarius, Clemens' false skeletonizer moth
- 4630 – Triprocris yampai
- 4630.1 – Triprocris cyanea
- 4631 – Triprocris smithsoniana
- 4631.1 – Neoprocris prunivora
- 4631.2 – Neoprocris floridana
- 4632 – Tetraclonia dyari
- 4633 – Tetraclonia latercula
- 4634 – Neoilliberis martenii
- 4634.1 – Neoilliberis kendalli
- 4634.2 – Neoilliberis arizonica
- 4635 – Neoilliberis fusca
- 4636 – Pyromorpha rata
- 4637 – Pyromorpha centralis
- 4638 – Pyromorpha caelebs
- 4639 – Pyromorpha dimidiata, orange-patched smoky moth
- 4639.1 – Pryeria sinica, euonymous defoliator moth

== Megalopygidae ==
- 4640 – Trosia dimas
- 4641 – Lagoa immaculata
- 4642 – Lagoa pyxidifera, yellow flannel moth
- 4643 – Lagoa lacyi, Florida flannel moth
- 4644 – Lagoa crispata, black-waved flannel moth
- 4645 – Megalopyge lapena
- 4646 – Megalopyge bissesa
- 4647 – Megalopyge opercularis, southern flannel moth
- 4648 – Norape tenera, mesquite stinger moth
- 4649 – Norape virgo
- 4650 – Norape ovina, white flannel moth

== Limacodidae and Dalceridae ==
- 4651 – Paleophobetron perornata
- 4651.1 – Euprosterna lacipea
- 4652 – Tortricidia testacea, early button slug moth
- 4653 – Tortricidia pallida, red-crossed button slug moth
- 4654 – Tortricidia flexuosa, abbreviated button slug moth
- 4655 – Slossonella tenebrosa
- 4656 – Kronaea minuta
- 4657 – Heterogenea shurtleffi, red-eyed button slug moth
- 4658 – Packardia albipunctata
- 4659 – Packardia geminata, jeweled tailed slug moth
- 4660 – Packardia ceanothi
- 4661 – Packardia elegans, elegant tailed slug moth
- 4662 – Lithacodes graefii
- 4663 – Lithacodes fiskeanus
- 4664 – Lithacodes gracea, graceful slug moth
- 4665 – Lithacodes fasciola, yellow-shouldered slug moth
- 4666 – Apoda biguttata
- 4667 – Apoda y-inversum, yellow-collared slug moth
- 4668 – Apoda rectilinea, rectilinea slug moth
- 4668.1 – Apoda latomia, western rectilinea slug moth
- 4669 – Apoda biguttata, shagreened slug moth
- 4670 – Prolimacodes trigona, western skiff moth
- 4671 – Prolimacodes badia, skiff moth
- 4672 – Cnidocampa flavescens
- 4673 – Alarodia slossoniae, Packard's white flannel moth
- 4674 – Cryptophobetron oropeso, ocotillo slug moth
- 4675 – Isochaetes beutenmuelleri, spun glass slug moth
- 4676 – Phobetron dyari
- 4677 – Phobetron pithecium, hag [monkey slug] moth
- 4678 – Natada nigripuncta
- 4679 – Natada nasoni, Nason's slug moth
- 4680 – Isa schaefferana
- 4681 – Isa textula, crowned slug moth
- 4682 – Adoneta gemina
- 4683 – Adoneta pygmaea
- 4684 – Adoneta bicaudata
- 4685 – Adoneta spinuloides, purple-crested slug moth
- 4686 – Monoleuca disconcolorata
- 4687 – Monoleuca fieldi
- 4688 – Monoleuca occidentalis
- 4689 – Monoleuca erectifascia
- 4690 – Monoleuca obliqua
- 4691 – Monoleuca semifascia, pin-striped vermilion slug moth
- 4692 – Monoleuca angustilinea
- 4693 – Monoleuca subdentosa
- 4694 – Euclea dolliana
- 4695 – Euclea flava
- 4696 – Euclea incisa
- 4697 – Euclea delphinii, spiny oak-slug moth
- 4697.1 – Euclea nanina, nanina oak-slug moth
- 4698 – Parasa chloris, smaller parasa moth
- 4699 – Parasa indetermina, stinging rose caterpillar moth
- 4700 – Acharia stimulea, saddleback caterpillar moth
- 4700.1 – Acharia extensa
- 4701 – Fulgoraecia exigua, planthopper parasite moth
- 4702 – Dalcerides ingenitus

== Crambidae ==
- 4703 – Gesneria centuriella
- 4704 – Gesneria rindgeorum
- 4705 – Cosipara tricoloralis, tricolored cosipara moth
- 4706 W – Cosipara modulalis
- 4707 – Cosipara chiricahuae
- 4708 – Scoparia rigidalis
- 4709 – Scoparia denigata
- 4710 W – Scoparia normalis
- 4711 W – Scoparia palloralis
- 4712 – Scoparia californialis
- 4713 – Scoparia apachealis
- 4714 – Scoparia ruidosalis
- 4715 – Scoparia blanchardi
- 4716 – Scoparia biplagialis, double-striped scoparia moth
- 4717 – Scoparia penumbralis, dark-brown scoparia moth
- 4718 – Scoparia cinereomedia
- 4719 – Scoparia basalis, many-spotted scoparia moth
- 4720 – Scoparia dominicki
- 4721 – Scoparia huachucalis
- 4722 W – Eudonia rectilinea
- 4723 W – Eudonia commortalis
- 4724 – Eudonia expallidalis
- 4725 – Eudonia franciscalis
- 4726 W – Eudonia torniplagalis
- 4727 W – Eudonia albertalis
- 4728 – Eudonia vivida
- 4729 W – Eudonia spaldingalis
- 4730 W – Eudonia spenceri
- 4731 – Eudonia rotundalis
- 4732 – Eudonia franclemonti
- 4733 – Eudonia schwarzalis
- 4734 – Eudonia leucophthalma
- 4735 W – Eudonia echo
- 4736 – Eudonia bronzalis
- 4737 – Eudonia lugubralis
- 4738 – Eudonia strigalis, striped eudonia moth
- 4739 – Eudonia heterosalis
- 4740 – Undulambia striatalis
- 4741 – Undulambia polystichalis, leatherleaf fern borer moth
- 4742 – Undulambia rarissima
- 4743 – Neocataclysta magnificalis, scrollwork pyralid moth
- 4744 – Chrysendeton medicinalis, bold medicine moth
- 4745 – Chrysendeton kimballi
- 4746 – Chrysendeton imitabilis
- 4746.1 – Chrysendeton nigrescens
- 4747 – Nymphula ekthlipsis, nymphula moth
- 4748 – Elophila icciusalis, pondside pyralid moth
- 4749 – Elophila faulalis
- 4750 – Elophila nebulosalis, nebulous munroessa moth
- 4751 – Elophila gyralis, waterlily borer moth
- 4752 – Contiger vittatalis
- 4753 – Nymphuliella daeckealis, china mark moth
- 4754 – Synclita tinealis
- 4755 – Synclita obliteralis, waterlily leafcutter moth
- 4756 – Synclita atlantica
- 4757 – Synclita occidentalis
- 4758 – Langessa nomophilalis, black langessa moth
- 4759 – Parapoynx maculalis, polymorphic pondweed moth
- 4760 – Parapoynx obscuralis, obscure pondweed moth
- 4761 – Parapoynx badiusalis, chestnut-marked pondweed moth
- 4762 – Parapoynx curviferalis
- 4763 – Parapoynx seminealis, floating-heart waterlilly moth
- 4764 – Parapoynx allionealis, watermilfoil leafcutter moth
- 4765 – Parapoynx diminutalis, hydrilla leafcutter moth
- 4767 – Usingeriessa onyxalis
- 4768 – Usingeriessa brunnildalis
- 4769 – Neargyractis slossonalis, dimorphic leafcutter moth
- 4770 – Petrophila drumalis
- 4771 W – Petrophila daemonalis
- 4772 – Petrophila cappsi
- 4773 W – Petrophila kearfottalis
- 4774 – Petrophila bifascialis, two-banded petrophila moth
- 4775 W – Petrophila jaliscalis
- 4776 – Petrophila hodgesi
- 4777 – Petrophila fulicalis
- 4778 – Petrophila santafealis
- 4779 – Petrophila canadensis, Canadian petrophila moth
- 4780 – Petrophila confusalis, confusing petrophila moth
- 4781 W – Petrophila avernalis
- 4782 – Petrophila cronialis
- 4783 – Petrophila longipennis
- 4784 W – Petrophila schaefferalis
- 4784.1 – Petrophila heppneri
- 4785 – Eoparargyractis irroratalis
- 4786 – Eoparargyractis floridalis
- 4787 – Eoparargyractis plevie
- 4788 – Oxyelophila callista
- 4789 – Metrea ostreonalis, oystershell metrea moth
- 4790 – Dichogama redtenbacheri, caper-leaf webworm moth
- 4791 – Dichogama amabilis
- 4792 – Dichogama colotha
- 4793 – Alatuncusia bergii, Berg's alatuncusia moth
- 4794 – Eustixia pupula, spotted peppergrass moth
- 4795 W – Microtheoris vibicalis, whip-marked snout moth
- 4796 – Microtheoris ophionalis, yellow-veined moth
- 4797 – Rhodocantha diagonalis
- 4798 W – Freschinia helianthiales
- 4799 – Freschinia lutosalis
- 4800 – Freschinia laetalis
- 4801 – Freschinia criddlealis
- 4802 – Freschinia texanalis
- 4803 W – Procymbopteryx belialis
- 4804 – Cymbopteryx fuscimarginalis
- 4805 – Cymbopteryx unilinealis
- 4806 – Neocymbopteryx heitzmani
- 4807 W – Edia semiluna
- 4808 – Edia minutissima
- 4809 W – Dichozoma parvipicta
- 4810 – Cuneifrons coloradensis
- 4811 – Gyros muirii
- 4812 – Gyros atripennalis
- 4813 – Gyros powelli
- 4814 – Anatralata versicolor
- 4815 – Eremanthe chemsaki
- 4816 – Metaxmeste nubicola
- 4817 – Pogonogenys proximalis
- 4818 – Pogonogenys frechini
- 4819 – Pogonogenys masoni
- 4820 – Chrismania pictipennalis
- 4821 – Plumipalpiella martini
- 4822 – Nannobotys commortalis
- 4823 – Porphyrorhegma fortunata
- 4824 – Psammobotys fordi
- 4825 – Psammobotys alpinalis
- 4826 – Mimoschinia rufofascialis, rufous-banded crambid moth
- 4827 W – Jativa castanealis
- 4828 – Pseudoschinia elautalis
- 4829 – Odontivalvia radialis
- 4830 – Noctueliopsis brunnealis
- 4831 W – Noctueliopsis puertalis
- 4832 – Noctueliopsis palmalis
- 4833 – Noctueliopsis atascaderalis
- 4834 – Noctueliopsis aridalis
- 4835 – Noctueliopsis pandoralis
- 4836 – Noctueliopsis rhodoxanthinalis
- 4837 W – Noctueliopsis bububattalis
- 4838 W – Noctueliopsis virula
- 4839 W – Mojavia achemonalis
- 4840 – Mojaviodes blanchardae
- 4841 – Heliothelopsis arbutalis
- 4842 – Heliothelopsis costipunctalis
- 4843 – Heliothelopsis unicoloralis
- 4844 – Chlorobaptella rufistrigalis
- 4845 – Glaucodontia pyraustoides
- 4846 – Hellula rogatalis, cabbage webworm moth
- 4847 – Hellula phidilealis, cabbage budworm moth
- 4848 – Hellula kempae, Kemp's hellula moth
- 4849 W – Hellula aqualis
- 4850 – Hellula subbasalis
- 4851 – Upiga virescens
- 4852 – Paregesta californiensis
- 4853 – Scybalistodes periculosalis
- 4854 – Scybalistodes vermiculalis
- 4855 – Scybalistodes regularis
- 4856 – Scybalistodes fortis
- 4857 – Nephrogramma reniculalis
- 4858 – Nephrogramma separata
- 4859 – Stegea mexicana
- 4860 – Stegea sola
- 4861 – Stegea simplicialis
- 4862 – Stegea minutalis
- 4863 – Stegea powelli
- 4864 – Stegea eripalis
- 4865 W – Stegea salutalis
- 4866 – Abegesta reluctalis
- 4867 – Abegesta remellalis, white-trimmed brown pyralid moth
- 4868 – Abegesta concha
- 4869 – Glaphyria glaphyralis, common glaphyria moth
- 4870 – Glaphyria sequistrialis, white-roped glaphyria moth
- 4871 – Glaphyria basiflavalis, basal-dash glaphyria moth
- 4872 – Glaphyria peremptalis
- 4873 – Glaphyria fulminalis, black-patched glaphyria moth
- 4874 – Glaphyria cappsi
- 4875 – Aethiophysa delicata
- 4876 – Aethiophysa dualis
- 4877 – Aethiophysa lentiflualis
- 4878 – Aethiophysa consimilis
- 4879 – Xanthophysa psychialis, xanthophysa moth
- 4880 – Plumegesta largalis
- 4881 – Lipocosma sicalis
- 4882 – Lipocosma diabata
- 4883 – Lipocosma adelalis
- 4884 – Lipocosma intermedialis
- 4885 – Lipocosma septa, exposed lipocosma moth
- 4886 – Lipocosma albinibasalis
- 4887 – Lipocosma polingi
- 4888 – Lipocosmodes fuliginosalis, sooty lipocosmodes moth
- 4889 – Dicymolomia julianalis, Julia's dicymolomia moth
- 4890 – Dicymolomia metalophota
- 4891 – Dicymolomia opuntialis
- 4892 W – Dicymolomia metalliferalis
- 4893 – Dicymolomia grisea
- 4894 – Dicymolomia micropunctalis
- 4895 – Chalcoela iphitalis, sooty-winged chalcoela moth
- 4896 – Chalcoela pegasalis, wasp parasitizer moth
- 4896.5 – Neomusotima conspurcatalis, lygodium defoliator moth
- 4897 – Evergestis pallidata, purple-backed cabbageworm moth
- 4898 – Evergestis rimosalis, cross-striped cabbageworm moth
- 4899 W – Evergestis consimilis
- 4900 – Evergestis aridalis
- 4901 – Evergestis unimacula, large-spotted evergestis moth
- 4902 W – Evergestis lunulalis
- 4903 – Evergestis nolentis
- 4904 W – Evergestis simulatilis
- 4905 – Evergestis angustalis
- 4906 W – Evergestis vinctalis
- 4907 – Evergestis palousalis
- 4908 – Evergestis comstocki
- 4909 W – Evergestis funalis
- 4910 W – Evergestis subterminalis
- 4911 – Evergestis eurekalis
- 4912 W – Evergestis obliqualis
- 4913 – Evergestis dischematalis
- 4914 – Evergestis triangulalis
- 4915 – Evergestis borregalis
- 4916 – Prorasea simalis
- 4917 – Prorasea gracealis
- 4918 W – Prorasea praeia
- 4919 – Prorasea fernaldi
- 4920 – Prorasea sideralis
- 4921 – Prorasea pulveralis
- 4922 W – Cornifrons actualis
- 4923 – Cornifrons phasma
- 4924 – Cylindrifrons succandidalis
- 4925 – Orenaia trivialis
- 4926 – Orenaia coloradalis
- 4927 – Orenaia arcticalis
- 4928 – Orenaia sierralis
- 4929 – Orenaia alticolalis
- 4930 – Orenaia pallidivittalis
- 4931 W – Orenaia macneilli
- 4932 – Evergestella evincalis
- 4933 – Trischistognatha pyrenealis
- 4934 – Munroeodes thalesalis
- 4935 – Saucrobotys fumoferalis, dusky saucrobotys moth
- 4936 – Saucrobotys futilalis, dogbane saucrobotys moth
- 4937 – Nascia acutella, streaked orange moth
- 4938 – Epicorsia oedipodalis
- 4939 – Pseudopyrausta santatalis
- 4939.1 – Pseudopyrausta marginalis
- 4940 – Oenobotys vinotinctalis, wine-tinted oenobotys moth
- 4941 – Oenobotys texanalis
- 4942 – Triuncidia eupalusalis
- 4943 – Crocidophora pustuliferalis
- 4944 – Crocidophora serratissimalis, angelic crocidiphora moth
- 4945 – Crocidophora tuberculalis, pale-winged crocidiphora moth
- 4946 – Ostrinia penitalis, American lotus borer moth
- 4947 – Ostrinia obumbratalis, smartweed borer moth
- 4948 – Ostrinia marginalis
- 4949 – Ostrinia nubilalis, European corn borer moth
- 4950 – Fumibotys fumalis, mint root borer moth
- 4951 – Perispasta caeculalis, Titian Peale's pyralid moth
- 4952 – Eurrhypara hortulata, small magpie moth
- 4953 – Phlyctaenia coronata, crowned phlyctaenia moth
- 4954 – Phlyctaenia quebecensis, Quebec phlyctaenia moth
- 4955 – Phlyctaenia leuschneri
- 4956 – Nealgedonia extricalis
- 4957 – Algedonia mysippusalis
- 4958 – Anania funebris, white-spotted sable moth
- 4959 W – Anania labeculalis
- 4960 – Hahncappsia fordi
- 4961 – Hahncappsia alpinensis
- 4962 – Hahncappsia marculenta
- 4963 – Hahncappsia neomarculenta
- 4964 – Hahncappsia pseudobliteralis
- 4965 – Hahncappsia neobliteralis
- 4966 W – Hahncappsia jaralis
- 4967 – Hahncappsia mancalis
- 4968 – Hahncappsia pergilvalis
- 4969 – Hahncappsia cochisensis
- 4970 W – Hahncappsia coloradensis
- 4971 – Hahncappsia ramsdenalis
- 4972 – Hahncappsia huachucalis
- 4973 – Hahncappsia mellinialis
- 4973.1 E – Ecpyrrhoerrhoe puralis
- 4974 – Achyra bifidalis
- 4975 – Achyra rantalis, garden webworm moth
- 4976 W – Achyra occidentalis
- 4977 – Neohelvibotys neohelvialis
- 4978 W – Neohelvibotys arizonensis
- 4979 – Neohelvibotys polingi
- 4980 – Helvibotys helvialis
- 4981 – Helvibotys pseudohelvialis
- 4982 – Helvibotys freemani
- 4983 – Helvibotys subcostalis
- 4984 – Helvibotys pucilla
- 4985 – Sitochroa aureolalis
- 4986 – Sitochroa dasconalis
- 4986.1 – Sitochroa palealis, greenish-yellow sitochroa moth
- 4987 – Sitochroa chortalis, dimorphic sitochroa moth
- 4988 – Arenochroa flavalis
- 4989 – Xanthostege roseiterminalis
- 4990 – Xanthostege plana
- 4991 – Sericoplaga externalis
- 4992 – Uresiphita reversalis, genista broom moth
- 4993 W – Loxostege albiceralis
- 4994 – Loxostege floridalis, Christmas-berry webworm moth
- 4995 – Loxostege lepidalis
- 4996 – Loxostege indentalis
- 4997 – Loxostege kearfottalis
- 4998 – Loxostege terpnalis
- 4999 – Loxostege unicoloralis
- 5000 – Loxostege allectalis
- 5001 – Loxostege typhonalis
- 5002 W – Loxostege oberthuralis
- 5003 W – Loxostege egregialis
- 5004 – Loxostege sticticalis, beet webworm moth
- 5005 – Loxostege mojavealis
- 5006 W – Loxostege kingi
- 5007 – Loxostege annaphilalis
- 5008 – Loxostege immerens
- 5009 – Loxostege quaestoralis
- 5010 – Loxostege anartalis
- 5011 – Loxostege ephippialis
- 5012 – Loxostege thrallophilalis
- 5013 – Loxostege brunneitincta
- 5014 W – Loxostege offumalis
- 5015 W – Loxostege sierralis
- 5016 – Loxostege commixtalis
- 5017 – Loxostege cereralis, alfalfa webworm moth
- 5018 – Pyrausta demantrialis
- 5019 W – Pyrausta nexalis, fulvous-edged pyrausta moth
- 5020 – Pyrausta sartoralis
- 5021 – Pyrausta roseivestalis
- 5022 W – Pyrausta zonalis
- 5023 W – Pyrausta napaealis
- 5024 W – Pyrausta linealis
- 5025 – Pyrausta ochreicostalis
- 5026 – Pyrausta pilatealis
- 5027 W – Pyrausta lethalis, lethal pyrausta moth
- 5028 – Pyrausta corinthalis
- 5029 W – Pyrausta volupialis, volupial pyrausta moth
- 5030 W – Pyrausta morenalis
- 5031 – Pyrausta atropurpuralis
- 5032 W – Pyrausta nicalis
- 5033 W – Pyrausta grotei
- 5034 – Pyrausta signatalis, raspberry pyrausta moth
- 5035 – Pyrausta pythialis
- 5036 – Pyrausta inveterascalis
- 5037 W – Pyrausta inornatalis, inornate pyrausta moth
- 5038 – Pyrausta shirleyae
- 5039 – Pyrausta coccinea
- 5040 – Pyrausta bicoloralis, bicolored pyrausta moth
- 5041 – Pyrausta augustalis
- 5042 – Pyrausta onythesalis
- 5043 – Pyrausta pseudonythesalis
- 5044 – Pyrausta insignitalis, dark-banded pyrausta moth
- 5045 – Pyrausta aurea
- 5046 – Pyrausta flavibrunnea
- 5047 W – Pyrausta klotsi
- 5048 – Pyrausta flavofascialis
- 5049 – Pyrausta phoenicealis, Phoenicean pyrausta moth
- 5050 – Pyrausta panopealis
- 5051 – Pyrausta rubricalis, variable reddish pyrausta moth
- 5052 W – Pyrausta californicalis, California pyrausta moth
- 5053 – Pyrausta pseuderosnealis
- 5054 – Pyrausta dapalis
- 5055 – Pyrausta homonymalis
- 5056 – Pyrausta generosa
- 5057 – Pyrausta subgenerosa
- 5058 – Pyrausta orphisalis, orange mint moth
- 5059 W – Pyrausta tuolumnalis
- 5060 – Pyrausta subsequalis
- 5060.1 – Pyrausta borealis, northern pyrausta moth
- 5060.2 W – Pyrausta plagalis
- 5061 W – Pyrausta tatalis
- 5062 – Pyrausta retidiscalis
- 5063 – Pyrausta andrei
- 5064 W – Pyrausta perrubralis, Shasta pyrausta moth
- 5065 – Pyrausta scurralis
- 5066 – Pyrausta arizonicalis
- 5067 W – Pyrausta semirubralis
- 5068 – Pyrausta unifascialis, pussy's toes pyrausta moth
- 5069 – Pyrausta tyralis, coffee-loving pyrausta moth
- 5070 – Pyrausta laticlavia, southern purple mint moth
- 5071 – Pyrausta acrionalis, mint-loving pyrausta moth
- 5072 – Pyrausta obtusanalis
- 5073 – Pyrausta niveicilialis, white-fringed pyrausta moth
- 5074 W – Pyrausta fodinalis
- 5075 – Pyrausta socialis, sociable pyrausta moth
- 5076 – Pyrausta antisocialis
- 5076.1 – Pyrausta cespitalis
- 5077 – Hyalorista taeniolalis
- 5078 – Portentomorpha xanthialis
- 5078.1 – Gonocausta sabinalis
- 5079 – Udea rubigalis, celery leaftier moth
- 5080 W – Udea profundalis
- 5081 W – Udea washingtonalis, Washington udea moth
- 5082 – Udea octosignalis
- 5083 – Udea vacunalis
- 5084 – Udea torvalis
- 5085 – Udea alaskalis
- 5086 – Udea inquinatalis
- 5087 – Udea rusticalis
- 5088 – Udea nordeggensis
- 5089 – Udea berberalis
- 5090 – Udea indistinctalis
- 5091 – Udea sheppardi
- 5092 – Udea saxifragae
- 5093 – Udea brevipalpis
- 5094 – Udea cacuminicola
- 5095 – Udea beringialis
- 5096 – Udea derasa
- 5097 – Udea livida
- 5098 – Udea turmalis
- 5099 – Udea itysalis
- 5100 W – Udea abstrusa
- 5101 – Udea radiosalis
- 5101.1 – Udea aenigmatica
- 5102 – Neoleucinodes prophetica
- 5103 – Lamprosema lunulalis
- 5104 – Lamprosema victoriae
- 5105 – Lamprosema sinaloanensis
- 5105.1 – Lamprosema baracoalis
- 5105.2 – Lamprosema canacealis
- 5106 – Lineodes fontella, eastern lineodes moth
- 5107 – Lineodes integra, eggplant leafroller moth
- 5108 – Lineodes interrupta
- 5109 – Lineodes triangulalis
- 5109.1 – Lineodes elcodes
- 5110 – Atomopteryx solanalis
- 5111 – Ercta vittata
- 5112 – Apilocrocis brumalis
- 5113 W – Apilocrocis pimalis, Pima apilocrocis moth
- 5114 – Diaphantania impulsalis
- 5115 – Loxostegopsis polle
- 5116 W – Loxostegopsis xanthocrypta
- 5117 – Loxostegopsis merrickalis, Merrick's pyralid moth
- 5118 – Loxostegopsis emigralis
- 5119 – Loxostegopsis curialis
- 5120 – Sufetula diminutalis
- 5120.1 – Sufetula carbonalis
- 5121 – Microphysetica hermeasalis
- 5122 – Eurrhyparodes lygdamis
- 5122.1 W – Eurrhyparodes splendens
- 5123 – Deuterophysa fernaldi
- 5124 – Hydropionea oblectalis
- 5125 – Hydropionea fenestralis
- 5126 – Geshna cannalis, lesser canna leafroller moth
- 5127 – Hydriris ornatalis, ornate hydriris moth
- 5128 W – Choristostigma plumbosignalis
- 5129 – Choristostigma zephyralis
- 5130 – Choristostigma roseopennalis
- 5131 – Choristostigma perpulchralis
- 5132 W – Choristostigma elegantale
- 5133 – Choristostigma disputalis
- 5134 – Choristostigma leucosalis
- 5135 – Mecyna submedialis, orange-toned mecyna moth
- 5136 – Mecyna fuscimaculalis
- 5137 – Mecyna mustelinalis
- 5138 – Mecyna luscitialis
- 5139 – Mimorista subcostalis
- 5140 – Mimorista trimaculalis
- 5141 – Mimorista tristigmalis
- 5142 – Diacme elealis, paler diacme moth
- 5143 – Diacme adipaloides, darker diacme moth
- 5144 – Diacme phyllisalis
- 5145 – Diacme mopsalis, mopsalis diacme moth
- 5145.1 – Diacme oriolalis
- 5146 – Epipagis forsythae, Forsyth's epipagis moth
- 5147 – Epipagis huronalis
- 5148 – Epipagis disparilis
- 5149 – Sameodes albiguttalis, waterhyacinth moth
- 5150 – Samea ecclesialis, assembly moth
- 5151 – Samea multiplicalis, salvinia stem-borer moth
- 5152 – Samea baccatalis
- 5152.1 – Samea druchasalis
- 5153 – Crocidocnemis pellucidalis
- 5154 – Loxomorpha cambogialis
- 5155 – Loxomorpha flavidissimalis
- 5156 – Nomophila nearctica, lucerne moth
- 5156.5 – Duponchelia fovealis, exotic greenhouse invasive
- 5157 – Rhectocraspeda periusalis, eggplant webworm moth
- 5158 – Ategumia ebulealis
- 5159 – Desmia funeralis, grape leaffolder moth
- 5160 – Desmia maculalis
- 5161 – Desmia subdivisalis
- 5162 – Desmia ufeus
- 5163 – Desmia divisalis
- 5164 – Desmia tages
- 5165 – Desmia stenizonalis
- 5166 – Desmia deploralis, deploring desmia moth
- 5167 – Desmia ploralis, mournful desmia moth
- 5168 – Desmia desmialis
- 5169 – Hymenia perspectalis, spotted beet webworm moth
- 5170 – Spoladea recurvalis, Hawaiian beet webworm moth
- 5171 – Diasemiopsis leodocusalis
- 5172 – Diasemiodes janassialis
- 5173 – Diasemiodes nigralis
- 5174 – Diathrausta reconditalis, recondite webworm moth
- 5175 – Diathrausta harlequinalis, harlequin webworm moth
- 5176 – Anageshna primordialis, yellow-spotted webworm moth
- 5177 – Apogeshna stenialis, checkered apogeshna moth
- 5178 – Steniodes mendica
- 5179 – Penestola bufalis, black penestola moth
- 5180 – Penestola simplicialis
- 5181 – Antigastra catalaunalis, sesame leafroller moth
- 5182 – Blepharomastix ranalis, hollow-spotted blepharomastix moth
- 5183 – Blepharomastix pseudoranalis
- 5184 – Blepharomastix potentalis
- 5185 – Blepharomastix achroalis
- 5186 W – Blepharomastix haedulalis
- 5187 – Hileithia magualis
- 5187.1 – Hileithia decostalis
- 5188 – Blepharomastix aplicalis
- 5189 – Blepharomastix rehamalis
- 5190 – Blepharomastix differentialis
- 5191 – Blepharomastix schistisemalis
- 5192 – Lygropia fusalis
- 5193 – Blepharomastix eudamidasalis
- 5193.5 – Hileitha decostalis
- 5194 – Araschnopsis subulalis
- 5195 – Eulepte anticostalis
- 5196 – Synclera jarbusalis
- 5197 – Glyphodes pyloalis, beautiful glyphodes moth
- 5198 – Glyphodes sibillalis, mulberry leaftier moth
- 5199 – Glyphodes floridalis
- 5199.1 – Glyphodes onychinalis
- 5200 – Colomychus talis, distinguished colymychus moth
- 5201 – Diaphania olealis
- 5202 – Diaphania nitidalis, pickleworm moth
- 5203 – Diaphania arguta
- 5204 – Diaphania hyalinata, melonworm moth
- 5205 – Diaphania modialis
- 5206 – Diaphania infimalis
- 5207 – Diaphania indica, exotic pumpkin caterpillar moth
- 5207.1 – Diaphania elegans
- 5208 – Diaphania lualis
- 5209 – Hoterodes ausonia
- 5210 – Leucochroma corope
- 5211 – Omiodes simialis
- 5212 – Omiodes indicata, bean-leaf webworm moth
- 5213 – Omiodes rufescens
- 5214 – Omiodes stigmosalis
- 5215 – Condylorrhiza vestigialis, the Alamo moth
- 5216 – Stemorrhages costata
- 5217 – Palpita flegia, satin white palpita moth
- 5218 – Palpita quadristigmalis, four-spotted palpita moth
- 5219 – Palpita kimballi, Kimball's palpita moth
- 5220 – Palpita gracialis, gracile palpita moth
- 5221 – Palpita cincinnatalis
- 5222 – Palpita arsaltealis
- 5223 – Palpita illibalis, inkblot palpita moth
- 5225 – Palpita freemanalis, Freeman's palpita moth
- 5226 – Palpita magniferalis, splendid palpita moth
- 5227 – Palpita aenescentalis
- no number yet – Palpita maritima
- 5228 – Polygrammodes flavidalis, ironweed root moth
- 5228.1 – Polygrammodes oxydalis
- 5229 – Polygrammodes langdonalis
- 5230 – Polygrammodes elevata, red-spotted sweetpotato moth
- 5231 – Polygrammodes sanguinalis
- 5232 – Azochis rufidiscalis
- 5233 – Compacta capitalis
- 5234 – Compacta hirtalis
- 5235 – Compacta hirtaloides
- 5236 – Laniifera cyclades
- 5237 – Mimophobetron pyropsalis
- 5238 – Liopasia teneralis
- 5239 – Terastia meticulosalis, erythrina borer moth
- 5240 – Agathodes designalis
- 5240.1 – Maruca vitrata, bean pod borer moth
- 5241 – Pantographa limata, basswood leafroller moth
- 5241.1 – Pantographa suffusalis
- 5243 – Pleuroptya silicalis, herbivorous pleuroptya moth
- 5244 – Herpetogramma fluctuosalis, greater sweetpotato webworm moth
- 5245 – Syllepte diacymalis
- 5246 – Phaedropsis chromalis
- 5247 – Phaedropsis stictigramma
- 5248 – Lygropia tripunctata, sweetpotato leafroller moth
- 5249 – Lygropia plumbicostalis
- 5250 – Lygropia rivulalis, bog lygropia moth
- 5251 – Lygropia octonalis, eight-barred lygropia moth
- 5252 – Lypotigris reginalis
- 5252.1 – Lypotigris fusalis
- 5253 – Diastictis argyralis, white-spotted orange moth
- 5254 – Diastictis pseudargyralis
- 5255 – Diastictis ventralis, white-spotted brown moth
- 5256 W – Diastictis fracturalis, fractured western snout moth
- 5257 – Diastictis holguinalis
- 5258 – Diastictis viridescens
- 5259 – Diastictis robustior
- 5260 – Diastictis sperryorum
- 5261 – Diastictis caecalis
- 5262 – Framinghamia helvalis
- 5263 – Microthyris anormalis
- 5264 – Microthyris prolongalis
- 5265 – Phostria tedea
- 5266 – Phostria oajacalis
- 5267 – Asciodes gordialis, bougainvillea caterpillar moth
- 5268 W – Psara obscuralis, obscure psara moth
- 5269 – Psara dryalis
- 5270 – Sathria internitalis
- 5271 – Bicilia iarchasalis
- 5272 – Herpetogramma bipunctalis, southern beet webworm moth
- 5274 – Herpetogramma phaeopteralis, dusky herpetogramma moth
- 5275 – Herpetogramma pertextalis, bold-feathered grass moth
- 5276 – Herpetogramma abdominalis
- 5277 – Herpetogramma thestealis, zigzag herpetogramma moth
- 5278 – Herpetogramma centrostrigalis
- 5279 – Herpetogramma theseusalis, herpetogramma moth
- 5280 – Herpetogramma aeglealis, serpentine webworm moth
- 5280.1 – Herpetogramma licarsisalis
- no number – *Herpetogramma sphingealis
- 5281 – Pilocrocis ramentalis, scraped pilocrocis moth
- 5282 – Cryptobotys zoilusalis
- 5283 – Syllepis hortalis
- 5283.1 – Syllepis marialis
- 5284 – Syngamia florella, orange-spotted flower moth
- 5285 – Salbia tytiusalis
- 5286 – Salbia mizaralis
- 5287 – Salbia haemorrhoidalis, lantana leaftier moth
- 5288 – Marasmia trapezalis, trapeze moth
- 5289 – Marasmia cochrusalis, marasmia moth
- 5290 – Conchylodes diphteralis
- 5291 – Conchylodes salamisalis, blush conchylodes moth
- 5292 – Conchylodes ovulalis, zebra conchylodes moth
- 5293 – Conchylodes concinnalis
- 5294 – Ommatospila narcaeusalis
- 5295 – Daulia magdalena, glittering magdalena moth
- 5296 – Daulia arizonensis
- 5297 – Palpusia goniopalpia
- 5298 – Maracayia chlorisalis
- 5298.1 – Sclerocona acutella
- 5299 – Acentria nivea
- 5299.1 – Acentria ephemerella, water veneer moth
- 5300 – Leptosteges xantholeucalis
- 5301 – Leptosteges flavicostella
- 5302 – Leptosteges flavifascialis
- 5303 – Leptosteges parthenialis
- 5304 – Leptosteges chrysozona
- 5305 – Leptosteges sordidalis
- 5306 – Leptosteges vestaliella
- 5307 – Carectocultus perstrialis, reed-boring crambid moth
- 5309 – Carectocultus dominicki
- 5310 – Rupela segrega
- 5311 – Rupela tinctella
- 5312 – Rupela sejuncta
- 5313 – Donacaula sordidella
- 5314 – Donacaula unipunctellus
- 5315 – Donacaula tripunctellus
- 5316 – Donacaula melinellus
- 5317 – Donacaula aquilellus
- 5318 – Donacaula pallulellus
- 5319 – Donacaula longirostrallus, long-beaked donacaula moth
- 5320 – Donacaula amblyptepennis
- 5321 – Donacaula roscidellus, brown donacaula moth
- 5322 – Donacaula nitidellus
- 5323 – Donacaula uxorialis
- 5324 – Donacaula maximellus
- 5325 – Cybalomia extorris
- 5326 – Surattha santella
- 5327 W – Surattha indentella
- 5328 – Mesolia baboquivariella
- 5329 – Mesolia oraculella
- 5330 – Mesolia huachucella
- 5331 – Mesolia incertella
- 5332 – Prionapteryx yavapai
- 5333 – Prionapteryx nebulifera, clouded veneer moth
- 5334 – Prionapteryx achatina
- 5335 – Prionapteryx cuneolalis
- 5336 – Prionapteryx serpentella
- 5337 W – Pseudoschoenobius opalescalis
- 5338 – Eufernaldia cadarella
- 5339 – Crambus pascuella
- 5340 – Crambus hamella
- 5341 – Crambus alienellus
- 5342 – Crambus bidens, Biden's grass-veneer moth
- 5343 – Crambus perlella, immaculate grass-veneer moth
- 5344 – Crambus unistriatellus, wide-stripe grass-veneer moth
- 5345 – Crambus whitmerellus, Whitmer's grass-veneer moth
- 5346 – Crambus tutillus
- 5347 – Crambus awemellus
- 5348 – Crambus lyonsellus
- 5349 – Crambus youngellus, Young's grass-veneer moth
- 5350 – Crambus daeckellus
- 5351 – Crambus gausapalis
- 5352 W – Crambus trichusalis
- 5353 – Crambus cockleellus
- 5354 – Crambus ainsliellus
- 5355 – Crambus praefectellus, common grass-veneer moth
- 5356 – Crambus bigelovi
- 5357 – Crambus leachellus, Leach's grass-veneer moth
- 5358 W – Crambus cypridalis
- 5359 – Crambus occidentalis
- 5360 – Crambus rickseckerellus
- 5361 – Crambus albellus, small white grass-veneer moth
- 5362 – Crambus agitatellus, double-banded grass-veneer moth
- 5362.1 – Crambus alboclavellus, white-clubbed grass-veneer moth
- 5363 – Crambus saltuellus, pasture grass-veneer moth
- 5364 – Crambus multilinellus, multinellus grass-veneer moth
- 5365 – Crambus girardellus, Girard's grass-veneer moth
- 5366 – Crambus watsonellus, Watson's grass-veneer moth
- 5367 – Crambus sanfordellus
- 5368 – Crambus braunellus
- 5369 – Crambus quinquareatus, large-striped grass-veneer moth
- 5370 – Crambus sperryellus
- 5371 – Crambus leuconotus
- 5372 – Crambus satrapellus
- 5373 W – Crambus cyrilellus
- 5374 – Crambus harrisi
- 5375 – Crambus johnsoni
- 5376 – Crambus sargentellus
- 5377 – Crambus angustexon
- 5378 – Crambus laqueatellus, eastern grass-veneer moth
- 5379 – Neodactria luteolellus, mottled grass-veneer moth
- 5380 – Neodactria zeellus
- 5381 – Neodactria caliginosellus, corn root webworm moth
- 5382 – Neodactria murellus
- 5383 – Neodactria modestellus
- 5383.1 – Neodactria glenni
- 5383.2 – Neodactria daemonis
- 5383.3 – Neodactria oktibbeha
- no number yet – Neodactria cochisensis
- 5384 – Fissicrambus albilineellus
- 5385 – Fissicrambus quadrinotellus
- 5386 – Parapediasia hulstellus
- 5387 – Loxocrambus coloradellus
- 5388 – Crambus dimidiatellus
- 5389 – Fernandocrambus harpipterus
- 5390 – Fernandocrambus ruptifascia
- 5391 – Chrysoteuchia topiarius, topiary grass-veneer moth
- 5392 – Arequipa turbatella
- 5393 – Raphiptera argillaceellus, diminutive grass-veneer moth
- 5394 – Platytes vobisne
- 5395 – Agriphila biarmicus
- 5396 W – Agriphila straminella
- 5397 W – Agriphila plumbifimbriellus
- 5398 – Agriphila costalipartella
- 5399 – Agriphila ruricolellus, lesser vagabond sod webworm
- 5400 – Agriphila undatus
- 5401 – Agriphila anceps
- 5402 – Agriphila biothanatalis
- 5403 – Agriphila vulgivagellus, vagabond crambus moth
- 5404 – Agriphila attenuatus
- 5405 – Agriphila angulatus
- 5406 – Catoptria trichostomus
- 5407 – Catoptria maculalis
- 5408 – Catoptria latiradiellus, three-spotted crambus moth
- 5409 W – Catoptria oregonica, Oregon catoptria moth
- 5410 – Pediasia aridella
- 5411 – Pediasia truncatellus
- 5412 – Pediasia browerellus
- 5413 – Pediasia trisecta, sod webworm moth
- 5414 – Pediasia laciniellus
- 5415 – Pediasia ericellus
- 5416 W – Pediasia abnaki
- 5417 – Pediasia dorsipunctellus
- 5417.1 – La cerveza
- 5418 – Microcrambus copelandi
- 5419 – Microcrambus biguttellus, gold-stripe grass-veneer moth
- 5420 – Microcrambus elegans, elegant grass-veneer moth
- 5421 – Microcrambus polingi
- 5422 – Microcrambus minor
- 5423 – Microcrambus discludellus
- 5424 – Microcrambus kimballi
- 5425 – Microcrambus matheri
- 5426 – Microcrambus croesus
- 5427 – Loxocrambus canellus
- 5428 – Loxocrambus mohaviellus
- 5429 – Loxocrambus awemensis
- 5430 – Fissicrambus fissiradiellus
- 5431 – Fissicrambus profanellus
- 5432 – Fissicrambus intermedius
- 5433 – Fissicrambus haytiellus, carpet-grass webworm moth
- 5434 – Fissicrambus hemiochrellus
- 5435 – Fissicrambus mutabilis, changeable grass-veneer moth
- 5436 – Loxocrambus hospition
- 5437 – Fissicrambus minuellus
- 5438 – Thaumatopsis edonis
- 5439 – Thaumatopsis pexellus, woolly grass-veneer moth
- 5440 W – Thaumatopsis magnificus
- 5441 – Thaumatopsis fernaldella
- 5442 – Thaumatopsis atomosella
- 5443 – Thaumatopsis floridalis, Floridian grass-veneer moth
- 5444 – Thaumatopsis fieldella
- 5445 – Thaumatopsis repandus
- 5446 W – Thaumatopsis crenulatella
- 5447 – Thaumatopsis pectinifer
- 5448 – Thaumatopsis actuellus
- 5449 – Thaumatopsis solutellus
- 5450 – Parapediasia decorellus, graceful grass-veneer moth
- 5451 – Parapediasia teterrella, bluegrass webworm moth
- 5451.1 – Parapediasia ligonella
- 5451.2 – Parapediasia torquatella
- 5451.3 – Almita portalia
- 5451.4 – Almita texana
- 5452 W – Thaumatopsis bolterellus
- 5452.1 – Thaumatopsis digramella
- 5453 – Tehama bonifatella
- 5454 – Euchromius ocelleus
- 5455 W – Euchromius californicalis, California grass-veneer moth
- 5456 – Microcausta flavipunctalis
- 5457 – Microcausta bipunctalis
- 5458 – Diptychophora harlequinalis
- 5459 – Diptychophora incisalis
- 5460 – Argyria nummulalis
- 5461 – Argyria subaenescens
- 5462 – Argyria rufisignella, mother-of-pearl moth
- 5463 – Argyria lacteella, milky urola moth
- 5463.1 – Argyria tripsacas
- 5464 – Urola nivalis, snowy urola moth
- 5465 – Vaxi auratella, curve-lined argyria moth
- 5466 – Vaxi critica, straight-lined argyria moth
- 5467 – Argyria tripsacas
- 5468 – Epina dichromella
- 5469 – Epina alleni
- 5470 – Chilo plejadellus, rice stalk borer moth
- 5471 – Chilo erianthalis
- 5472 – Chilo demotellus
- 5473 – Thopeutis forbesellus
- 5474 – Occidentalia comptulatalis
- 5475 – Diatraea saccharalis, sugarcane borer moth
- 5476 – Diatraea crambidoides, southern cornstalk borer moth
- 5477 – Diatraea venosalis
- 5478 – Diatraea evanescens
- 5479 – Diatraea grandiosella, southwestern corn borer moth
- 5480 – Diatraea lineolata
- 5481 – Diatraea lisetta
- no number yet – Diatraea mitteri
- 5482 – Haimbachia squamulella
- 5483 – Haimbachia arizonensis
- 5484 – Haimbachia pallescens
- 5485 – Haimbachia indistinctalis
- 5486 – Haimbachia discalis
- 5487 – Haimbachia floridalis
- 5488 – Haimbachia albescens, silvered haimbachia moth
- 5489 – Haimbachia placidella, peppered haimbachia moth
- 5490 – Haimbachia cochisensis
- 5491 – Haimbachia diminutalis
- 5492 – Eoreuma densella, wainscot grass-veneer moth
- 5493 – Eoreuma loftini
- 5494 – Eoreuma evae
- 5495 – Eoreuma confederata
- 5496 – Eoreuma multipunctella
- 5497 – Eoreuma callista
- 5498 – Eoreuma crawfordi
- 5498.1 – Eoreuma arenella
- 5499 – Xubida linearella, x-linear grass-veneer moth
- 5500 – Xubida panalope
- 5501 – Xubida relovae
- 5502 – Xubida punctilineella
- 5503 – Xubida lipan
- 5504 – Xubida dentilineatella
- 5505 – Xubida puritella
- 5506 W – Xubida chiloidella
- 5507 – Hemiplatytes epia
- 5508 – Hemiplatytes prosenes
- 5509 – Hemiplatytes parallela
- No number yet – Schacontia themis

== See also ==
- List of butterflies of North America
- List of Lepidoptera of Hawaii
- List of moths of Canada
- List of butterflies of Canada
