= Euclea flava =

Scientific classification
- Domain: Eukaryota
- Kingdom: Animalia
- Phylum: Arthropoda
- Class: Insecta
- Order: Lepidoptera
- Family: Limacodidae
- Genus: Euclea
- Species: E. flava

Binomial name
- Euclea flava Barnes & McDunnough, 1910

Species of moth

Euclea flava is a moth in the family Limacodidae (the slug caterpillar moths). The species was first described by William Barnes and James Halliday McDunnough in 1910.

The MONA or Hodges number for Euclea flava is 4695.
