= Pyrausta coccinea =

Scientific classification
- Kingdom: Animalia
- Phylum: Arthropoda
- Clade: Pancrustacea
- Class: Insecta
- Order: Lepidoptera
- Family: Crambidae
- Genus: Pyrausta
- Species: P. coccinea

Binomial name
- Pyrausta coccinea Warren, 1892

Species of moth

Pyrausta coccinea is a moth in the family Crambidae. It was described by William Warren in 1892. It is found in North America, where it has been recorded from California.

The wingspan is about 11–12 mm. The forewings are blackish with a dark discal spot and a whitish spot on the costa. The hindwings are dull crimson with a black hind margin. Adults have been recorded on wing from April to May.
