= Vaxi tripsacas =

Scientific classification
- Kingdom: Animalia
- Phylum: Arthropoda
- Clade: Pancrustacea
- Class: Insecta
- Order: Lepidoptera
- Family: Crambidae
- Subfamily: Crambinae
- Tribe: Calamotrophini
- Genus: Vaxi
- Species: V. tripsacas

Binomial name
- Vaxi tripsacas (Dyar, 1921)

Synonyms
- Crambus tripsacas Dyar, 1921

Species of moth

Vaxi tripsacas is a moth in the family Crambidae. It was described by Harrison Gray Dyar Jr. in 1921. It is found in North America, where it has been recorded from Florida and Alabama. It is also present on the West Indies.

The wingspan is 14–16 mm. Adults are on wing from February to July and again from October to December.

The larvae feed on Gramineae species.
