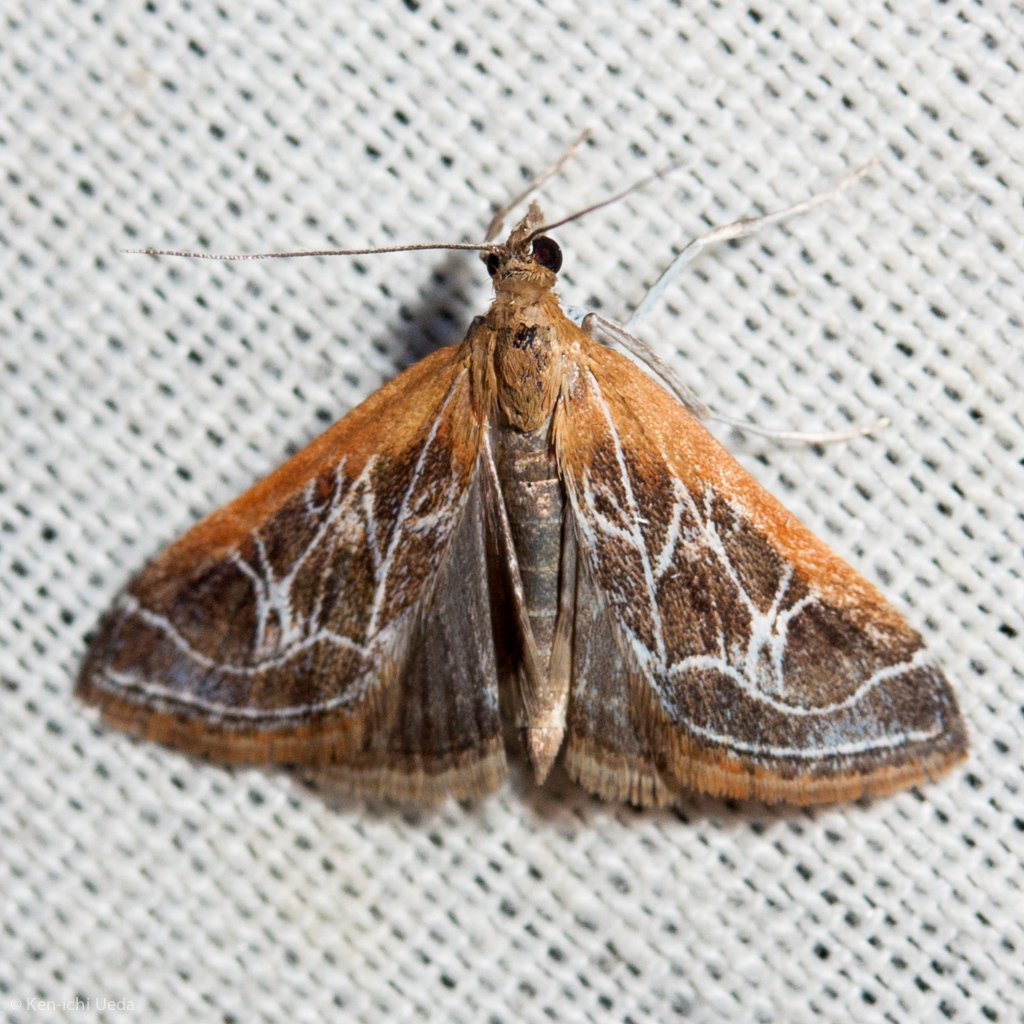

Scientific classification
- Domain: Eukaryota
- Kingdom: Animalia
- Phylum: Arthropoda
- Class: Insecta
- Order: Lepidoptera
- Family: Crambidae
- Genus: Pyrausta
- Species: P. nexalis

Binomial name
- Pyrausta nexalis (Hulst, 1886)

Synonyms
- Botis nexalis Hulst, 1886; Autocosmia concinna Warren, 1892

= Pyrausta nexalis =

Species of moth

Pyrausta nexalis, the fulvous-edged pyrausta moth, is a moth in the family Crambidae. It was described by George Duryea Hulst in 1886. It is found in North America, where it has been recorded from Washington, Montana, Arizona, California, New Mexico, Oklahoma, Texas and Utah.

The wingspan is about 18 mm. The forewings are dark fuscous, except for the basal two-thirds of the costa, which are fulvous brown. The forewings are crossed by two white hair lines. Adults have been recorded on wing from February to March and from May to November.
