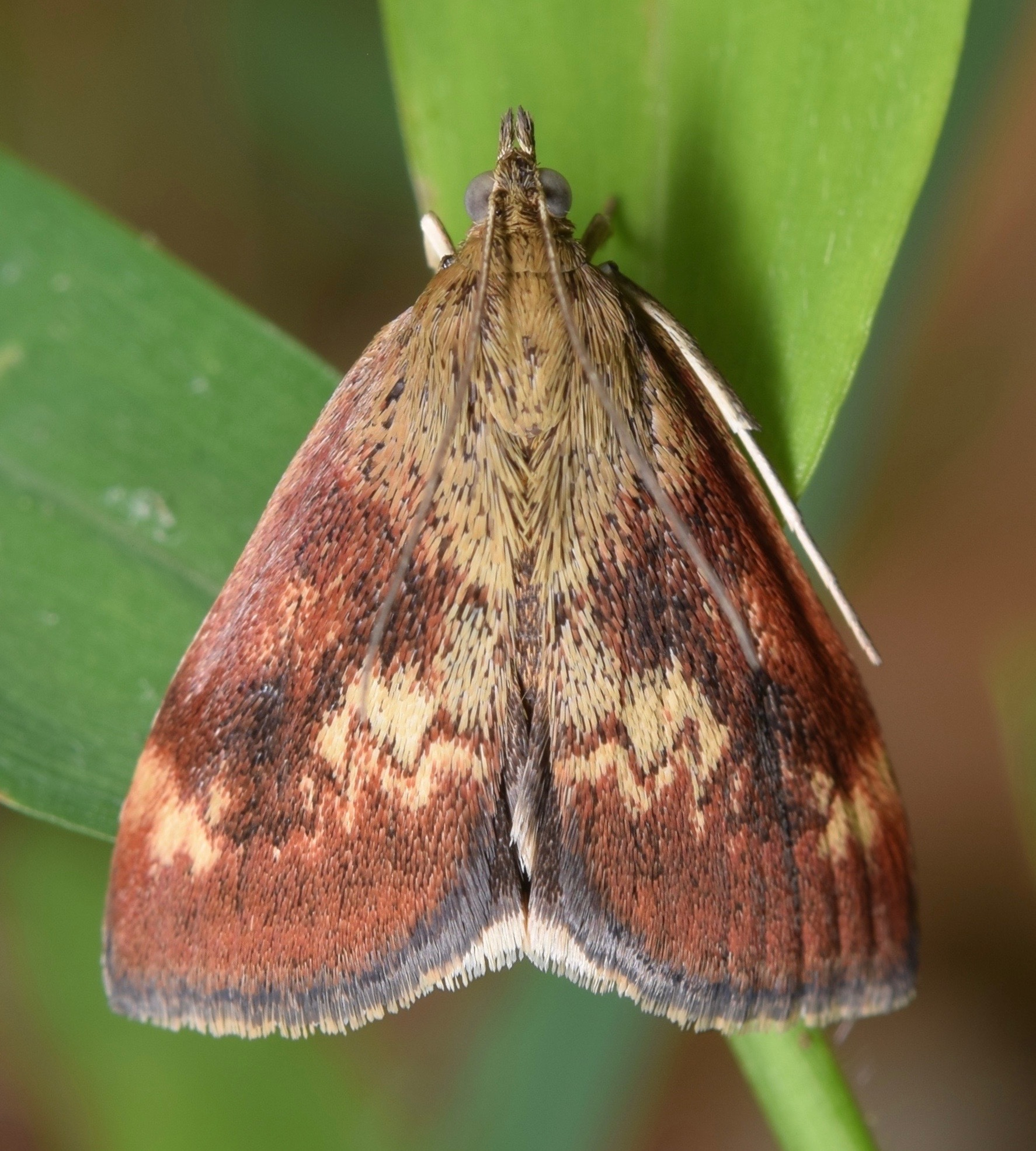

Scientific classification
- Domain: Eukaryota
- Kingdom: Animalia
- Phylum: Arthropoda
- Class: Insecta
- Order: Lepidoptera
- Family: Crambidae
- Genus: Pyrausta
- Species: P. homonymalis

Binomial name
- Pyrausta homonymalis Munroe, 1976

Synonyms
- Herbula submarginalis Walker, [1866] (preocc. Walker, 1866)

= Pyrausta homonymalis =

Species of moth

Pyrausta homonymalis is a moth in the family Crambidae. It was described by Eugene G. Munroe in 1976. It is found in North America, where it has been recorded from Missouri to Virginia, Mississippi and Florida, west to Texas.

Adults are on wing from May to June.
