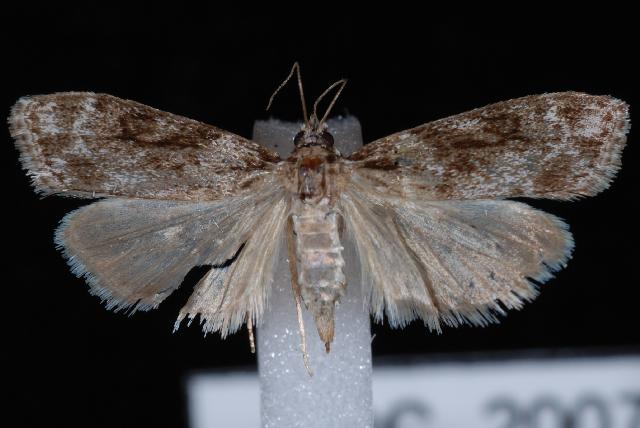

Scientific classification
- Kingdom: Animalia
- Phylum: Arthropoda
- Class: Insecta
- Order: Lepidoptera
- Family: Crambidae
- Genus: Eudonia
- Species: E. spenceri

Binomial name
- Eudonia spenceri Munroe, 1972

= Eudonia spenceri =

Species of moth

Eudonia spenceri is a moth in the family Crambidae. It was described by Eugene G. Munroe in 1972. It is found in North America, where it has been recorded from California and Arizona to Montana and British Columbia.

The length of the forewings is 8–9 mm. Adults have been recorded on wing from April to September.
