= Pyrausta subgenerosa =

Scientific classification
- Kingdom: Animalia
- Phylum: Arthropoda
- Class: Insecta
- Order: Lepidoptera
- Family: Crambidae
- Genus: Pyrausta
- Species: P. subgenerosa

Binomial name
- Pyrausta subgenerosa Munroe, 1976

Species of moth

Pyrausta subgenerosa is a species of moth in the family Crambidae. It was first described by Eugene G. Munroe in 1976. It is found in North America, where it has been recorded from California.
