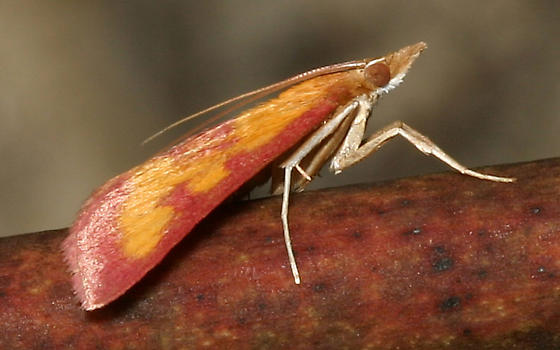

Scientific classification
- Kingdom: Animalia
- Phylum: Arthropoda
- Class: Insecta
- Order: Lepidoptera
- Family: Crambidae
- Genus: Pyrausta
- Species: P. laticlavia

Binomial name
- Pyrausta laticlavia (Grote & Robinson, 1867)

Synonyms
- Botys laticlavia Grote & Robinson, 1867; Botys cinerosa Grote & Robinson, 1867

= Pyrausta laticlavia =

Species of moth

Pyrausta laticlavia, the southern purple mint moth, is a species of moth of the family Crambidae. It is found from New Jersey south to Florida, west to Texas, Oklahoma and California. In California, the species has expanded its range northward into the San Francisco Bay area (1990) and Sacramento Valley (1993) recently.

The wingspan is about 17 mm. The moth flies from June to August depending on the location.

Larvae have been reared on Rosmarinus officinalis.
