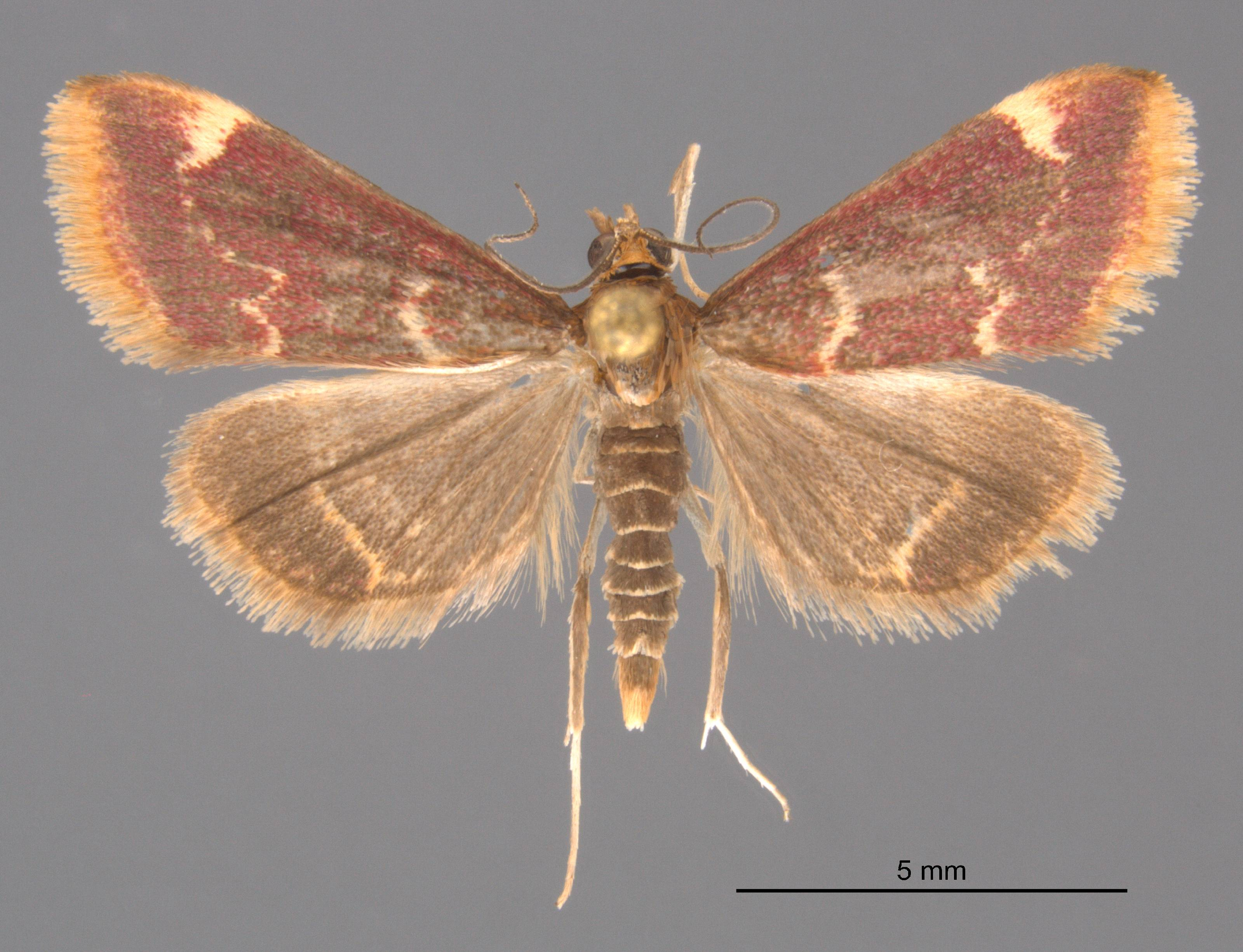

Scientific classification
- Domain: Eukaryota
- Kingdom: Animalia
- Phylum: Arthropoda
- Class: Insecta
- Order: Lepidoptera
- Family: Crambidae
- Genus: Pyrausta
- Species: P. inveterascalis

Binomial name
- Pyrausta inveterascalis Barnes & McDunnough, 1918

= Pyrausta inveterascalis =

Species of moth

Pyrausta inveterascalis is a moth in the family Crambidae. It was described by William Barnes and James Halliday McDunnough in 1918. It is found in North America, where it has been recorded from western Pennsylvania to southern Ontario, Illinois and Missouri.

The wingspan is about 15 mm. The ground color of the forewings is dull vinous with a narrow terminal yellow area. The hindwings are smoky.

The larvae feed on Monarda species.
