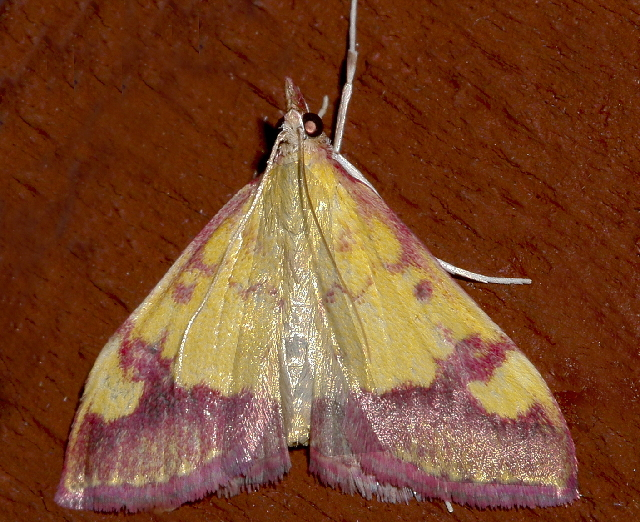

Scientific classification
- Kingdom: Animalia
- Phylum: Arthropoda
- Clade: Pancrustacea
- Class: Insecta
- Order: Lepidoptera
- Family: Crambidae
- Genus: Pyrausta
- Species: P. perrubralis

Binomial name
- Pyrausta perrubralis (Packard, 1873)

Synonyms
- Botys perrubralis Packard, 1873

= Pyrausta perrubralis =

Species of moth

Pyrausta perrubralis is a moth in the family Crambidae. It was described by Packard in 1873. It is found in North America, where it has been recorded from British Columbia, California, New Mexico, Oregon and Washington.

The forewings are deep ochreous-yellow with bright red scales. The hindwings are whitish with a small black discal spot. Adults have been recorded on wing from April to October.

== Subspecies ==
- Pyrausta perrubralis perrubralis
- Pyrausta perrubralis saanichalis Munroe, 1951 (British Columbia)
- Pyrausta perrubralis shastanalis Munroe, 1976 (California)
