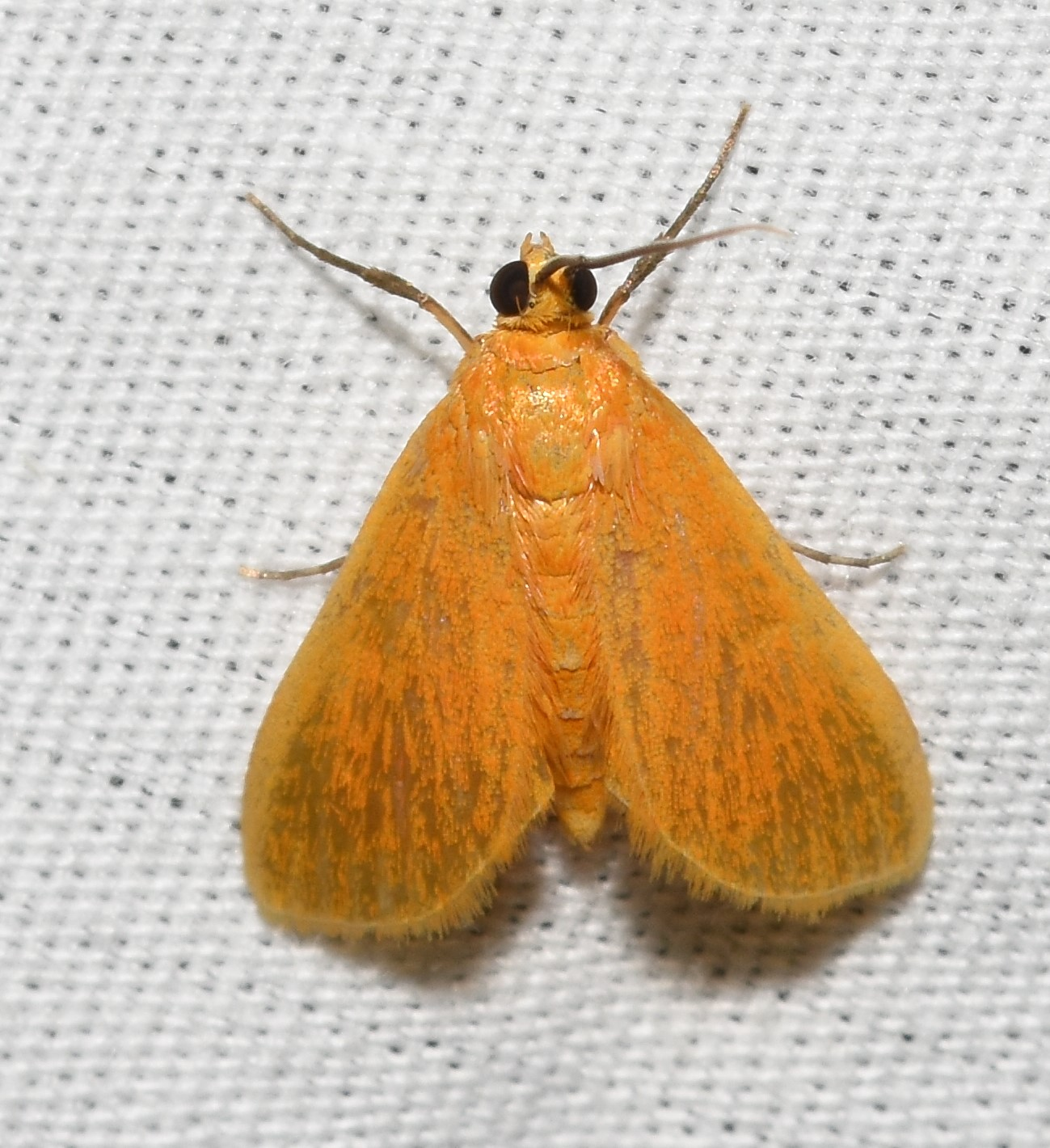

Scientific classification
- Domain: Eukaryota
- Kingdom: Animalia
- Phylum: Arthropoda
- Class: Insecta
- Order: Lepidoptera
- Family: Crambidae
- Genus: Helvibotys
- Species: H. pucilla

Binomial name
- Helvibotys pucilla (H. Druce, 1895)

Synonyms
- Filodes pucilla H. Druce, 1895; Lygropia subcostalis Dyar, 1912

= Helvibotys pucilla =

Species of moth

Helvibotys pucilla is a moth in the family Crambidae first described by Herbert Druce in 1895. It is found in Guatemala, Costa Rica, the Mexican state of Veracruz and the United States, where it has been recorded from Kentucky, Oklahoma and Texas

The wingspan is 15–18 mm. The forewings and hindwings of the males are uniform brownish yellow. Adults have been recorded on wing from May to August.
