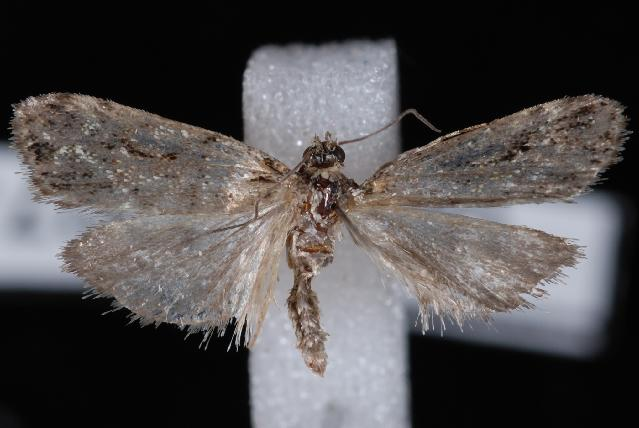

Scientific classification
- Kingdom: Animalia
- Phylum: Arthropoda
- Class: Insecta
- Order: Lepidoptera
- Family: Crambidae
- Genus: Eudonia
- Species: E. leucophthalma

Binomial name
- Eudonia leucophthalma (Dyar, 1929)

Synonyms
- Scoparia leucophthalma Dyar, 1929

= Eudonia leucophthalma =

Species of moth

Eudonia leucophthalma is a moth in the family Crambidae. It was described by Harrison Gray Dyar Jr. in 1929. It is found in North America, where it has been recorded from British Columbia and Alberta to Washington and California.

The wingspan is about 14 mm. Adults are similar to Eudonia echo, but smaller and the dark shadings are more olivaceous and denser (not grey). The lines are narrowed and contrasting whitish. The reniform spot is Y-shaped with a small white speck on the lower side. Adults have been recorded on wing from May to September.

== Subspecies ==
- Eudonia leucophthalma leucophthalma (British Columbia)
- Eudonia leucophthalma petaluma Munroe, 1972 (California)
