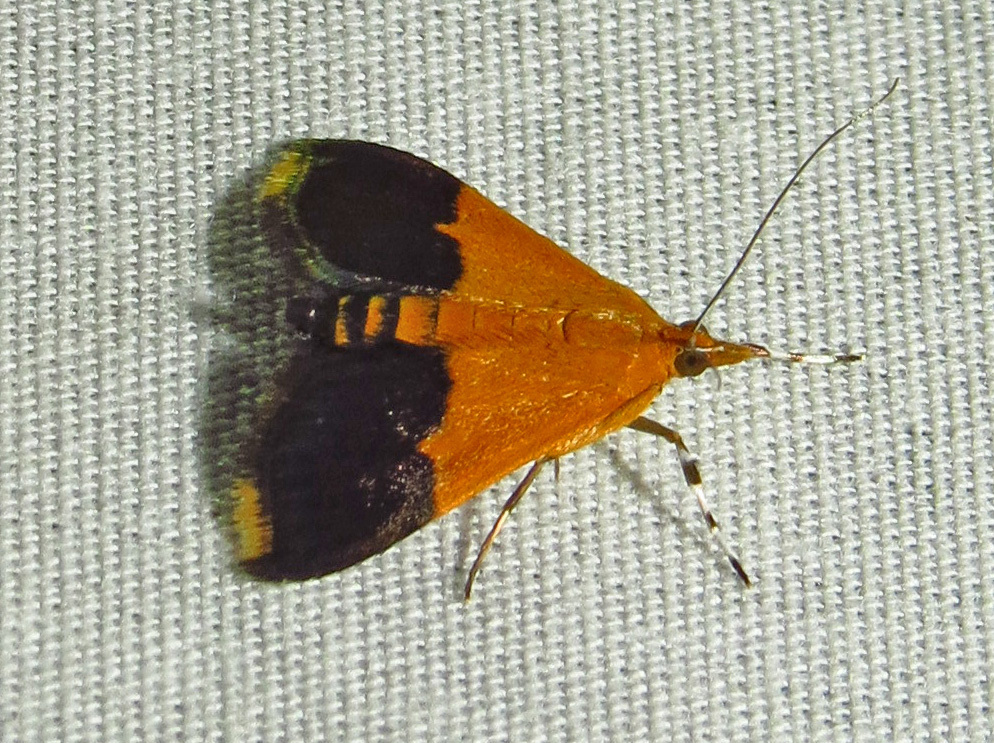

Scientific classification
- Domain: Eukaryota
- Kingdom: Animalia
- Phylum: Arthropoda
- Class: Insecta
- Order: Lepidoptera
- Family: Crambidae
- Genus: Pyrausta
- Species: P. augustalis

Binomial name
- Pyrausta augustalis (C. Felder, R. Felder & Rogenhofer, 1875)

Synonyms
- Botys augustalis C. Felder, R. Felder & Rogenhofer, 1875

= Pyrausta augustalis =

Species of moth

Pyrausta augustalis is a moth in the family Crambidae. It was described by Cajetan Felder, Rudolf Felder and Alois Friedrich Rogenhofer in 1875. It is found from Texas through Mexico south to Central America.

The wingspan is about 18 mm. Adults have been recorded on wing in March, from June to July and in November.
