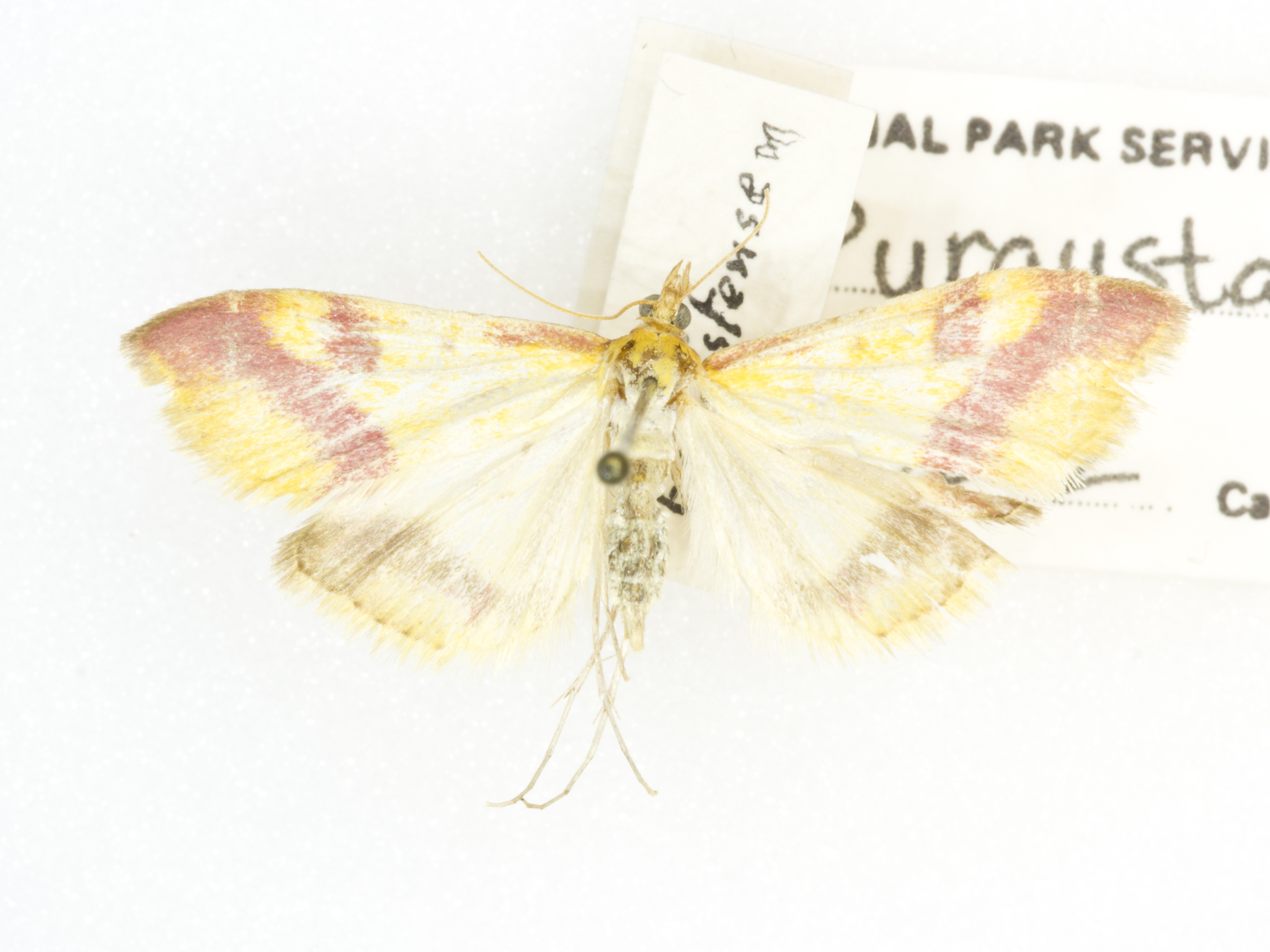

Scientific classification
- Kingdom: Animalia
- Phylum: Arthropoda
- Class: Insecta
- Order: Lepidoptera
- Family: Crambidae
- Genus: Pyrausta
- Species: P. scurralis

Binomial name
- Pyrausta scurralis (Hulst, 1886)

Synonyms
- Botis scurralis Hulst, 1886; Pyrausta postrubralis Hampson, 1899

= Pyrausta scurralis =

Species of moth

Pyrausta scurralis is a moth in the family Crambidae. It was first observed and described by George Duryea Hulst in 1886. It is found in North America, where it has been recorded/reported in the Canadian provinces of Ontario, Manitoba and Saskatchewan to the US states, California, Arizona, and New Mexico and in Mexico.

The wingspan of this moth is about 23 mm.

The larvae possibly feed on a Labiatae species.

== Subspecies ==
- Pyrausta scurralis scurralis
- Pyrausta scurralis awemealis Munroe, 1976 (Manitoba, Saskatchewan)
