= Eudonia bronzalis =

Scientific classification
- Kingdom: Animalia
- Phylum: Arthropoda
- Class: Insecta
- Order: Lepidoptera
- Family: Crambidae
- Genus: Eudonia
- Species: E. bronzalis

Binomial name
- Eudonia bronzalis (Barnes & Benjamin, 1922)

Synonyms
- Scoparia bronzalis Barnes & Benjamin, 1922

Species of moth

Eudonia bronzalis is a moth in the family Crambidae. It was described by William Barnes and Foster Hendrickson Benjamin in 1922. It is found in North America, where it has been recorded from California.
