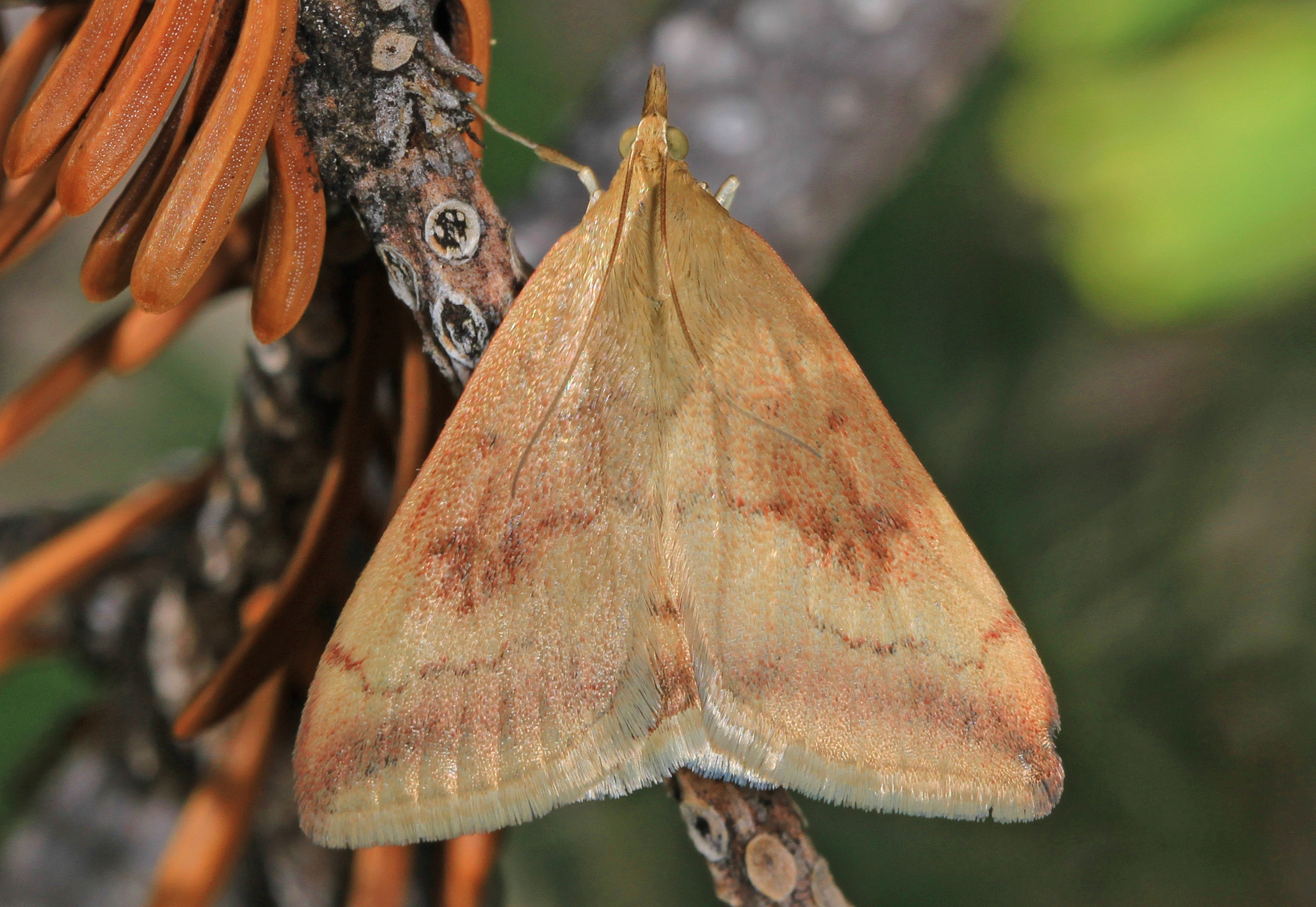

Scientific classification
- Domain: Eukaryota
- Kingdom: Animalia
- Phylum: Arthropoda
- Class: Insecta
- Order: Lepidoptera
- Family: Crambidae
- Genus: Pyrausta
- Species: P. fodinalis

Binomial name
- Pyrausta fodinalis (Lederer, 1863)

Synonyms
- Botys fodinalis Lederer, 1863

= Pyrausta fodinalis =

Species of moth

Pyrausta fodinalis is a moth in the family Crambidae. It was described by Julius Lederer in 1863. It is found in North America, where it has been recorded from British Columbia to Quebec and the north-eastern United States. It is also present in California, Nevada, Colorado and Wyoming. The habitat consists of undisturbed prairie and grassland areas.

The wingspan is 22–25 mm. Adults are on wing from June to August.

The larvae feed on Monardella villosa.

== Subspecies ==
- Pyrausta fodinalis fodinalis (California)
- Pyrausta fodinalis monticola Munroe, 1976 (California, Nevada, Colorado, Wyoming)
- Pyrausta fodinalis septenrionicola Munroe, 1976 (British Columbia, Alberta, Manitoba, Ontario, Quebec)
