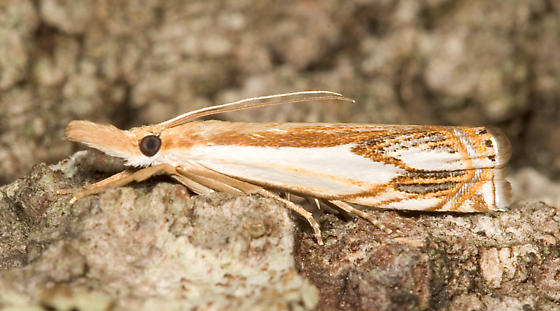

Scientific classification
- Kingdom: Animalia
- Phylum: Arthropoda
- Clade: Pancrustacea
- Class: Insecta
- Order: Lepidoptera
- Family: Crambidae
- Genus: Crambus
- Species: C. agitatellus

Binomial name
- Crambus agitatellus Clemens, 1860

Synonyms
- Crambus alboclavellus Zeller, 1863; Crambus carolinellus Haimbach, 1915

= Crambus agitatellus =

Species of moth

Crambus agitatellus, the double-banded grass-veneer moth, is a moth of the family Crambidae. The species was first described by James Brackenridge Clemens in 1860. Adults are on wing from June to August.

== Description ==
Adult double-banded grass-veneers have a wingspan of 17–22 mm. They rest with their forewings rolled tightly over their hindwings, giving them a long and slender appearance at rest. The forewings have a broad white stripe which is tapered at both ends. In some individuals, this marking may be bisected by a faint yellow stripe. 4 or 5 black lines extend from end of this white stripe and eventually meet a yellow-orange horizontal line near the end of the wing. The hindwings are pale gray or brown and lack markings.

== Range and Habitat ==
C. agitatellus is found in the eastern two-thirds of the United States and south-eastern Canada. The species is most commonly found in open grassy areas such as fields and lawns.

== Ecology ==
The larvae feed on various grasses and other low-growing plants.
