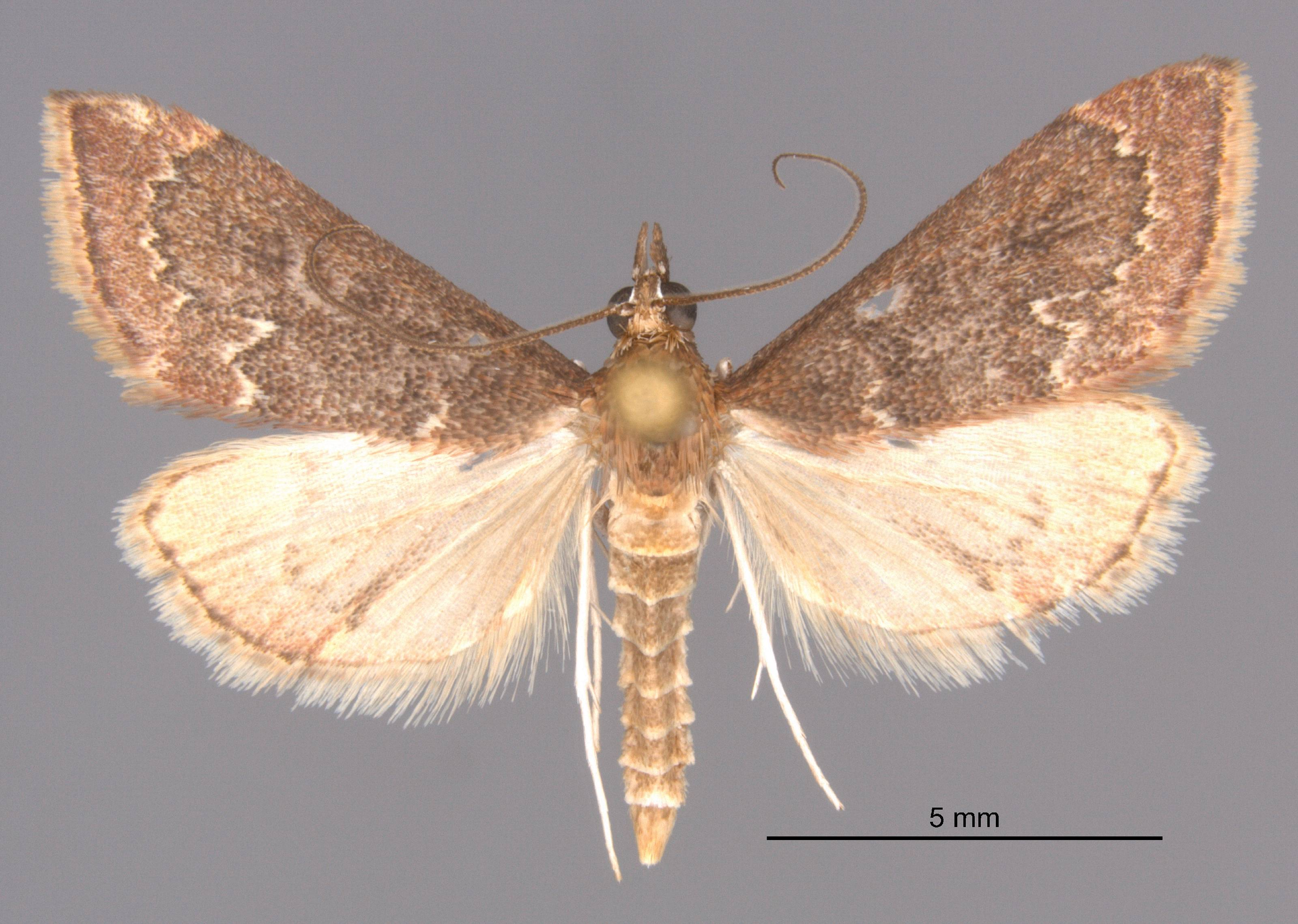

Scientific classification
- Domain: Eukaryota
- Kingdom: Animalia
- Phylum: Arthropoda
- Class: Insecta
- Order: Lepidoptera
- Family: Crambidae
- Genus: Pyrausta
- Species: P. roseivestalis

Binomial name
- Pyrausta roseivestalis Munroe, 1976

= Pyrausta roseivestalis =

Species of moth

Pyrausta roseivestalis is a moth in the family Crambidae. It was described by Eugene G. Munroe in 1976. It is found in North America, where it has been recorded from California and southern Arizona.

The wingspan is about 17 mm. Adults have been recorded on wing in May, July and from September to October.

== Etymology ==
The species name is derived from Latin rosei (meaning rose) and vestalis (meaning coat).
