= Pyrausta borealis =

Scientific classification
- Kingdom: Animalia
- Phylum: Arthropoda
- Clade: Pancrustacea
- Class: Insecta
- Order: Lepidoptera
- Family: Crambidae
- Genus: Pyrausta
- Species: P. borealis

Binomial name
- Pyrausta borealis Packard, 1867

Synonyms
- Pyrausta subsequalis borealis

Species of moth

Pyrausta borealis, the northern pyrausta moth, is a moth in the family Crambidae. It was described by Alpheus Spring Packard in 1867. It is found in North America, where it has been recorded from Newfoundland and Labrador west to British Columbia, north to Alaska and the Yukon. The habitat consists of boreal forests.

The wingspan is 14–18 mm. Adults are on wing from mid-May to mid-July.

== Taxonomy ==
The species was formerly treated as a subspecies of Pyrausta subsequalis.
