= Pyrausta shirleyae =

Scientific classification
- Domain: Eukaryota
- Kingdom: Animalia
- Phylum: Arthropoda
- Class: Insecta
- Order: Lepidoptera
- Family: Crambidae
- Genus: Pyrausta
- Species: P. shirleyae

Binomial name
- Pyrausta shirleyae Munroe, 1976

Species of moth

Pyrausta shirleyae is a moth in the family Crambidae. It was described by Eugene G. Munroe in 1976. It is found in North America, where it has been recorded from Florida.
