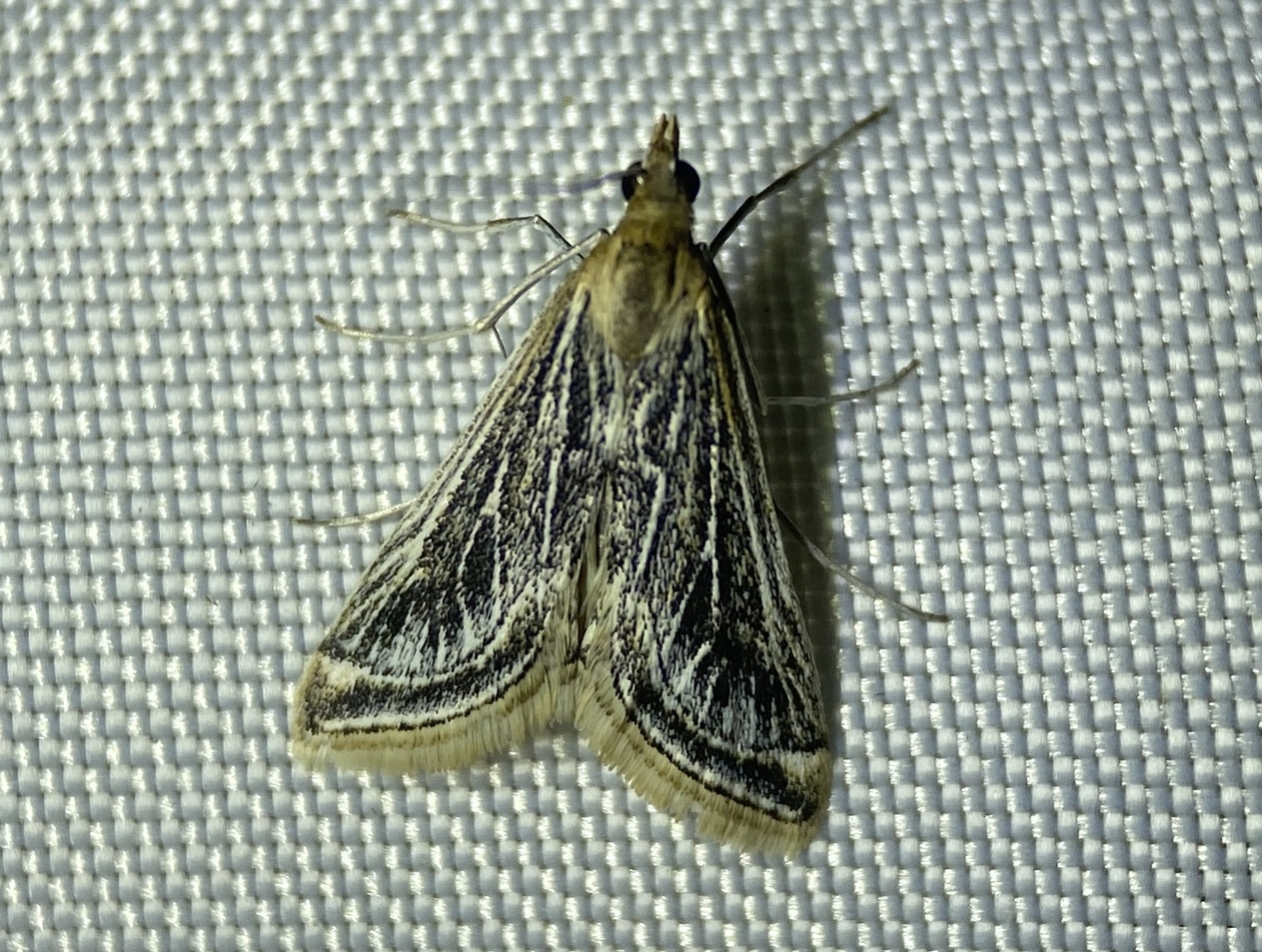

Scientific classification
- Domain: Eukaryota
- Kingdom: Animalia
- Phylum: Arthropoda
- Class: Insecta
- Order: Lepidoptera
- Family: Crambidae
- Genus: Pyrausta
- Species: P. linealis

Binomial name
- Pyrausta linealis (Fernald, 1894)

Synonyms
- Loxostege linealis Fernald, 1894

= Pyrausta linealis =

Species of moth

Pyrausta linealis is a moth in the family Crambidae. It was described by Charles H. Fernald in 1894. It is found in North America, where it has been recorded from eastern Washington to California (Mojave Desert) and Nevada.

The wingspan is 17–20 mm. The forewings are light ochreous yellow. The hindwings are white, stained with pale yellow at the outer margin. Adults have been recorded on wing from March to June.
