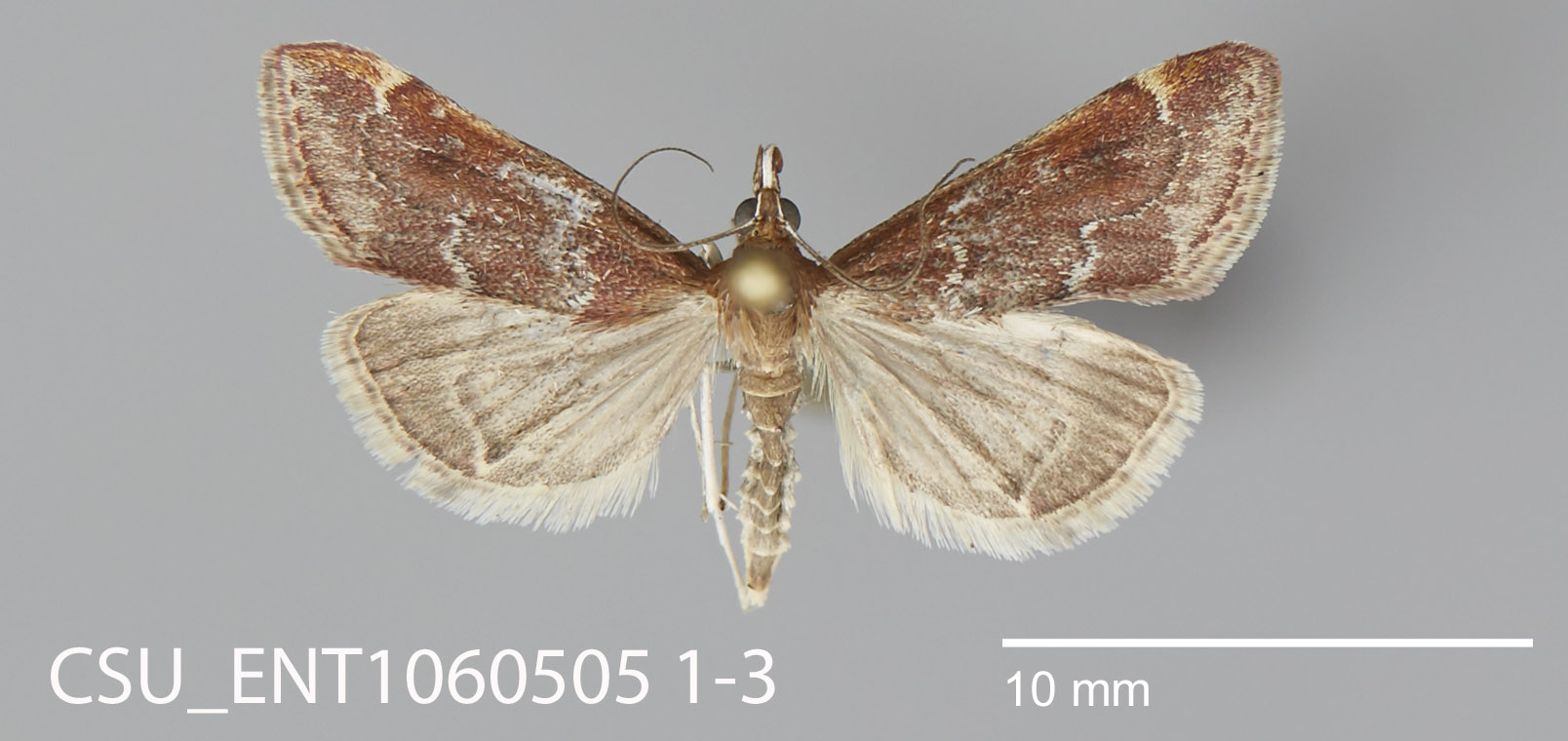

Scientific classification
- Kingdom: Animalia
- Phylum: Arthropoda
- Class: Insecta
- Order: Lepidoptera
- Family: Crambidae
- Genus: Pyrausta
- Species: P. morenalis

Binomial name
- Pyrausta morenalis (Dyar, 1908)

Synonyms
- Metasia morenalis Dyar, 1908

= Pyrausta morenalis =

Species of moth

Pyrausta morenalis is a moth in the family Crambidae. It was described by Harrison Gray Dyar Jr. in 1908. It is found in North America, where it has been recorded from Washington to California and west to Texas and Nevada. It is also found in Mexico.

The wingspan is 18–22 mm. The forewings are dark reddish brown with a bronzy shine. The hindwings are pale. Adults have been recorded on wing from March to July and in October and December.
