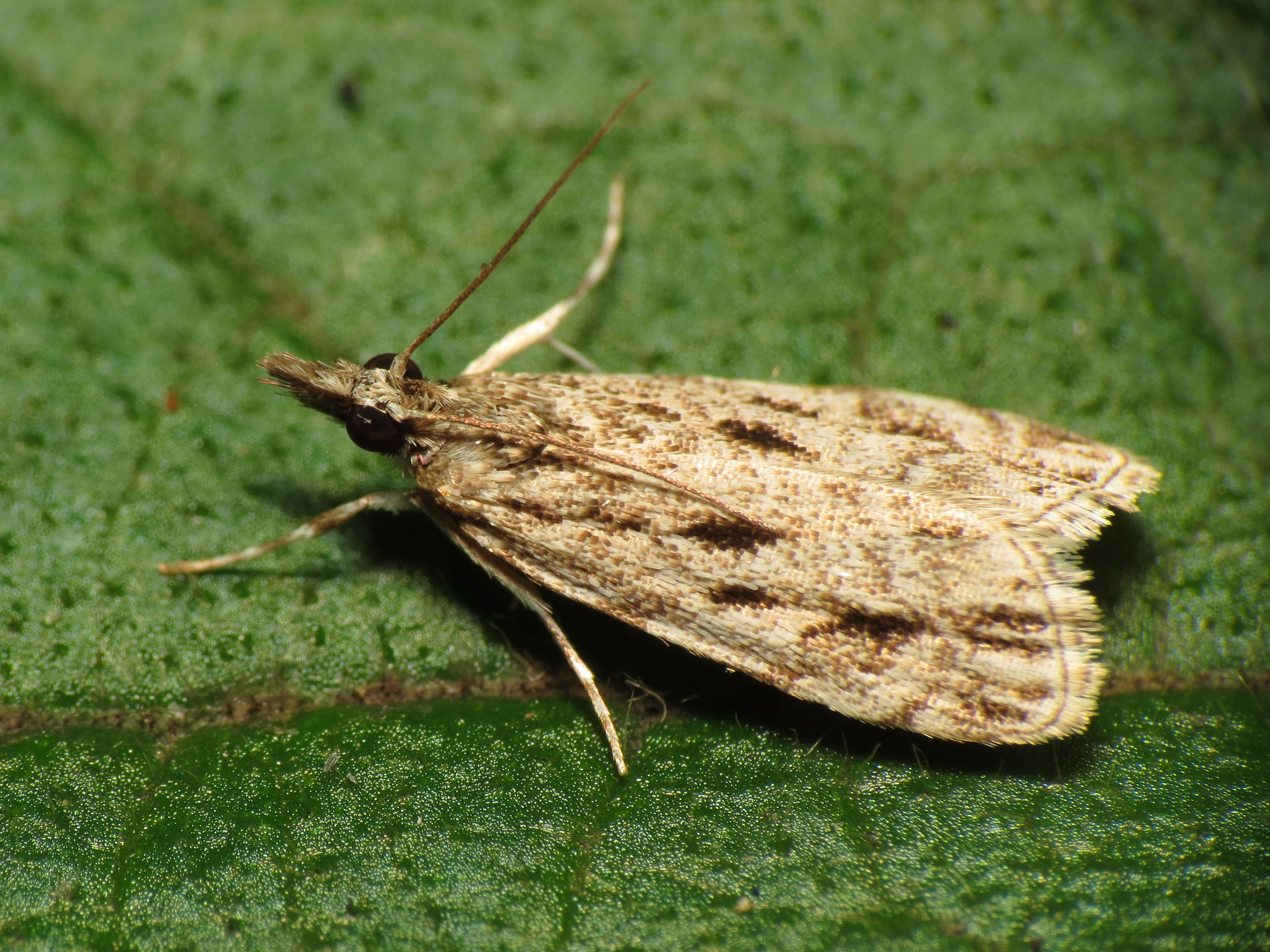

Scientific classification
- Kingdom: Animalia
- Phylum: Arthropoda
- Class: Insecta
- Order: Lepidoptera
- Family: Crambidae
- Genus: Eudonia
- Species: E. strigalis

Binomial name
- Eudonia strigalis (Dyar, 1906)

Synonyms
- Scoparia strigalis Dyar, 1906

= Eudonia strigalis =

Species of moth

Eudonia strigalis, the striped eudonia moth, is a moth in the family Crambidae. It was described by Harrison Gray Dyar Jr. in 1906. It is found in North America, where it has been recorded from Nova Scotia to southern Ontario and south to Florida.

The wingspan is 13–17 mm. Adults are on wing year round in the southern part of the range. In the north, adults are on wing from May to September.
