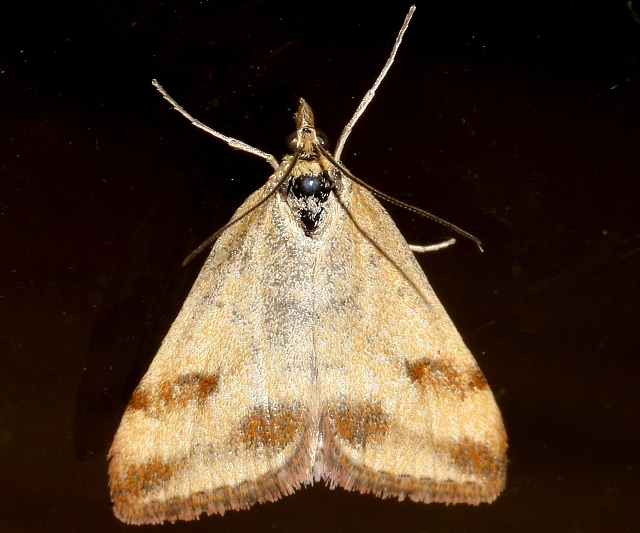

Scientific classification
- Kingdom: Animalia
- Phylum: Arthropoda
- Clade: Pancrustacea
- Class: Insecta
- Order: Lepidoptera
- Family: Crambidae
- Genus: Pyrausta
- Species: P. semirubralis

Binomial name
- Pyrausta semirubralis (Packard, 1873)

Synonyms
- Botys semirubralis Packard, 1873

= Pyrausta semirubralis =

Species of moth

Pyrausta semirubralis is a moth in the family Crambidae. It was described by Alpheus Spring Packard in 1873. It is found in North America, where it has been recorded from southern British Columbia to California, Nevada, Colorado and Arizona. The habitat consists of coastal areas, reaching inland up to altitudes of about 9000 ft.

The length of the forewings is 9–11 mm. The basal half of the forewings is dull dark brown. The remaining area is dull brick red. The hindwings are faded brick red. Adults have been recorded on wing from April to September. peaking around May
