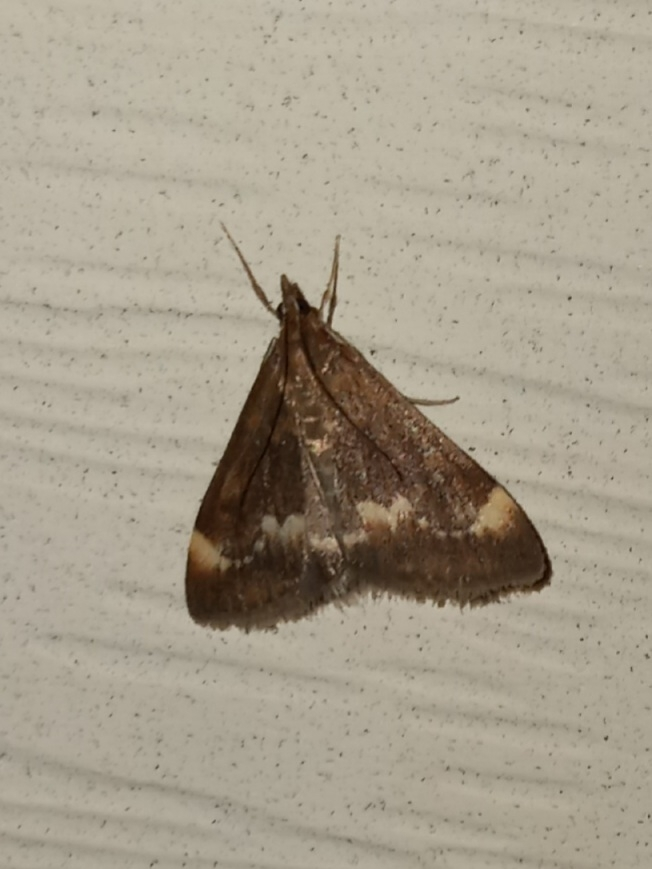

Scientific classification
- Kingdom: Animalia
- Phylum: Arthropoda
- Clade: Pancrustacea
- Class: Insecta
- Order: Lepidoptera
- Family: Crambidae
- Genus: Pyrausta
- Species: P. nicalis

Binomial name
- Pyrausta nicalis (Grote, 1878)

Synonyms
- Stemmatophora nicalis Grote, 1878; Botis uxorculalis Hulst, 1886; Syllythria subnicalis Warren, 1892

= Pyrausta nicalis =

Species of moth

Pyrausta nicalis is a moth in the family Crambidae. It was described by Augustus Radcliffe Grote in 1878. It is found in North America, where it has been recorded from Quebec west to British Columbia, south to Colorado, Utah, Nevada and California.

The wingspan is 20–23 mm. Adults are on wing from late May to mid-August.

The larvae possibly feed on Mentha species.
