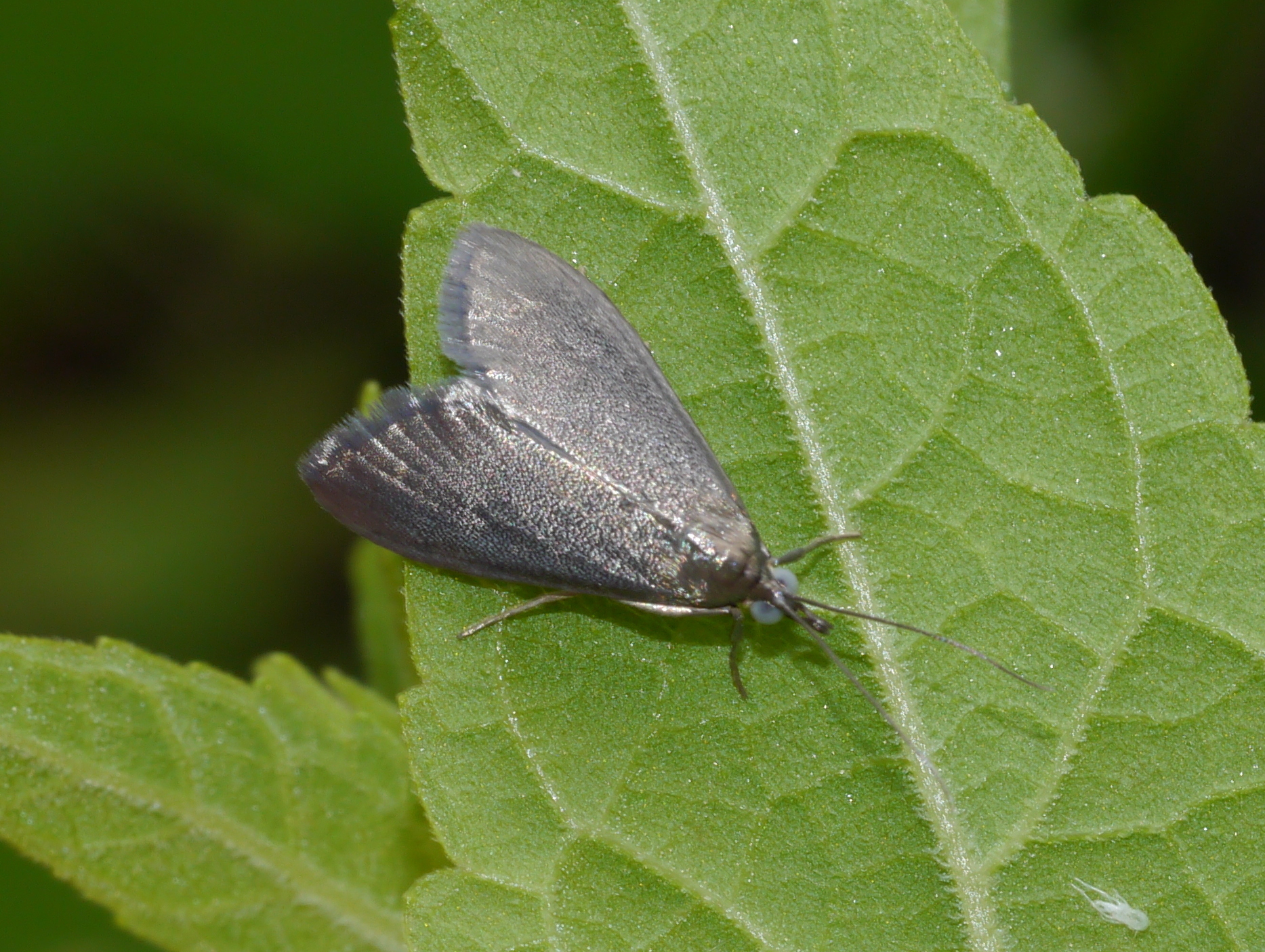

Scientific classification
- Domain: Eukaryota
- Kingdom: Animalia
- Phylum: Arthropoda
- Class: Insecta
- Order: Lepidoptera
- Family: Crambidae
- Genus: Pyrausta
- Species: P. demantrialis

Binomial name
- Pyrausta demantrialis (H. Druce, 1895)

Synonyms
- Blepharomastix demantrialis H. Druce, 1895; Pyrausta atrisquamalis Dognin, 1905; Pyrausta monotonigra Amsel, 1956

= Pyrausta demantrialis =

Species of moth

Pyrausta demantrialis is a moth in the family Crambidae. It was described by Herbert Druce in 1895. It is found in the United States, where it has been recorded from Arizona, Florida, Indiana, Michigan, New Mexico, North Carolina, Pennsylvania, Texas and West Virginia. It has also been recorded from Mexico (Guerrero), Ecuador (Loja Province) and Venezuela.

Adults have been recorded on wing from June to November in the United States.
