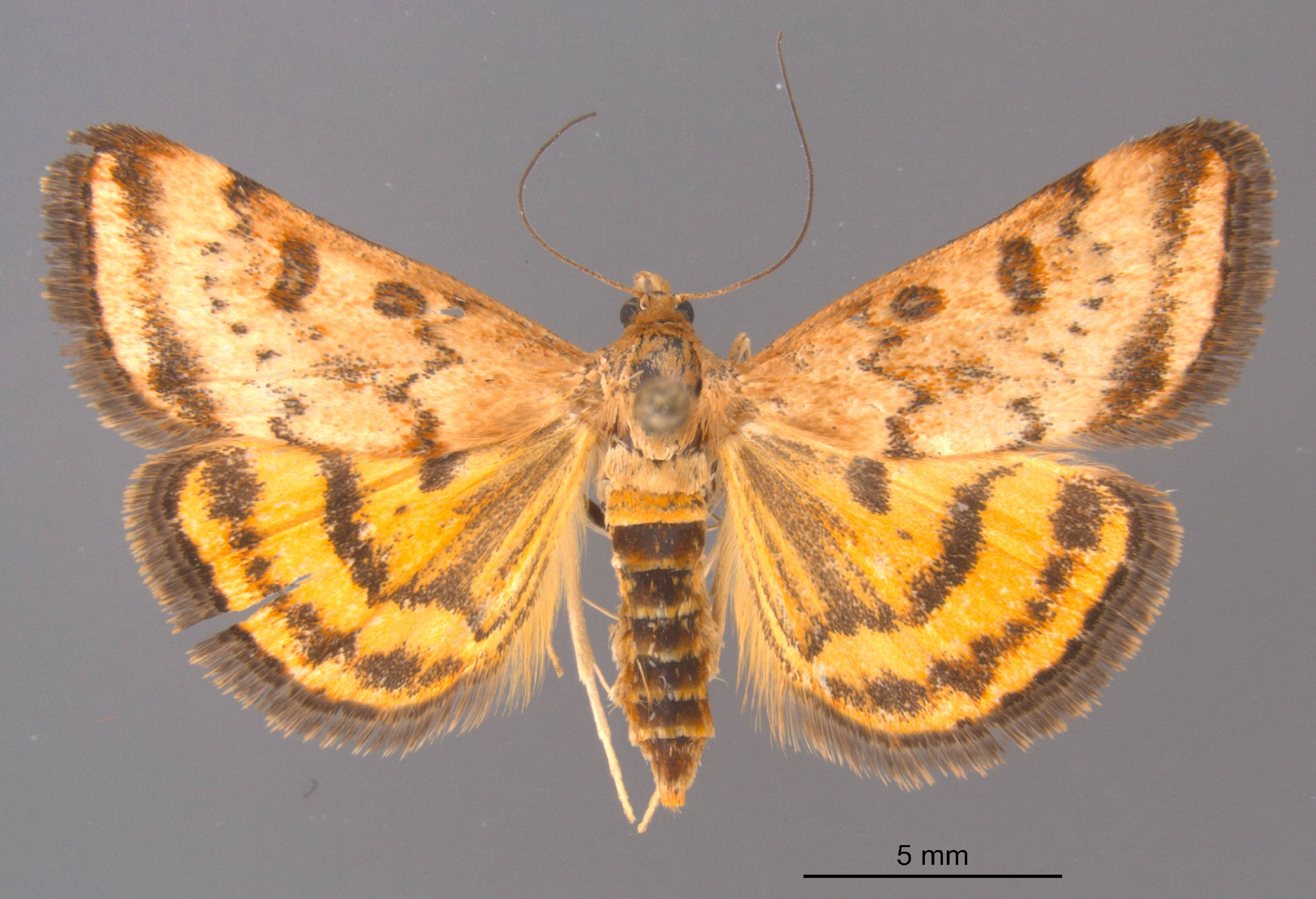

Scientific classification
- Domain: Eukaryota
- Kingdom: Animalia
- Phylum: Arthropoda
- Class: Insecta
- Order: Lepidoptera
- Family: Crambidae
- Genus: Pyrausta
- Species: P. plagalis

Binomial name
- Pyrausta plagalis Haimbach, 1908

Synonyms
- Pyrausta subsequalis plagalis Haimbach, 1908; Pyrausta insequalis plagalis Haimbach, 1908

= Pyrausta plagalis =

Species of moth

Pyrausta plagalis is a species of moth in the family Crambidae. It was first described by Frank Haimbach in 1908. It is found in North America, where it has been recorded from California, Montana and Oklahoma.

The wingspan is 25 mm. Adults have been recorded on wing in April and from July to September.

== Taxonomy ==
The species was formerly treated as a subspecies of Pyrausta subsequalis.
