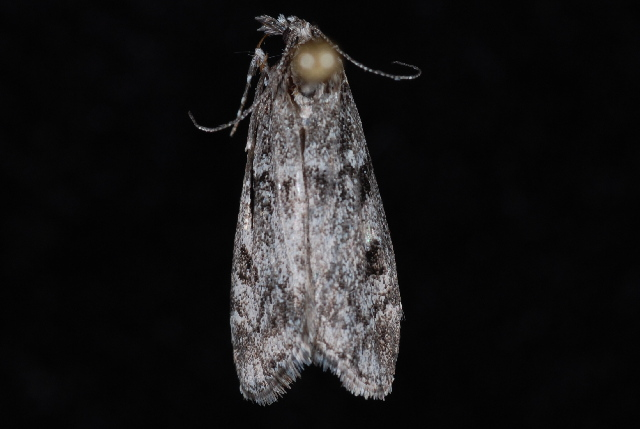

Scientific classification
- Kingdom: Animalia
- Phylum: Arthropoda
- Class: Insecta
- Order: Lepidoptera
- Family: Crambidae
- Genus: Eudonia
- Species: E. albertalis

Binomial name
- Eudonia albertalis (Dyar, 1929)

Synonyms
- Scoparia albertalis Dyar, 1929

= Eudonia albertalis =

Species of moth

Eudonia albertalis is a moth in the family Crambidae. It was described by Harrison Gray Dyar Jr. in 1929. It is found in North America, where it has been recorded from Alberta to British Columbia, Washington, Idaho and Wyoming.

The wingspan is about 18 mm.
