= Scoparia cinereomedia =

Scientific classification
- Kingdom: Animalia
- Phylum: Arthropoda
- Clade: Pancrustacea
- Class: Insecta
- Order: Lepidoptera
- Family: Crambidae
- Genus: Scoparia
- Species: S. cinereomedia

Binomial name
- Scoparia cinereomedia Dyar, 1904

Synonyms
- Scoparia truncatalis McDunnough, 1923

Species of moth

Scoparia cinereomedia is a moth in the family Crambidae. It was described by Harrison Gray Dyar Jr. in 1904. It is found in North America, where it has been recorded from British Columbia, Kentucky, Maine, Manitoba, Maryland, New Brunswick, New Hampshire, North Carolina, Nova Scotia, Ohio, Ontario, Quebec, South Carolina, Tennessee, Virginia and West Virginia.

The wingspan is about 14.5–15 mm. The forewings are pale grey, the basal area shaded with black up to the inner line. The middle of the wing is clear grey. The terminal area is shaded in black. The hindwings are greyish. Adults have been recorded on wing from May to August.
