= Udea aenigmatica =

Scientific classification
- Domain: Eukaryota
- Kingdom: Animalia
- Phylum: Arthropoda
- Class: Insecta
- Order: Lepidoptera
- Family: Crambidae
- Genus: Udea
- Species: U. aenigmatica

Binomial name
- Udea aenigmatica (Heinrich, 1931)

Synonyms
- Platytes aenigmatica Heinrich, 1931

Species of moth

Udea aenigmatica is a moth in the family Crambidae. It was described by Carl Heinrich in 1931. It is found in North America, where it has been recorded from Colorado.

The wingspan is about 26 mm. The forewings are a pale straw colour, with a conspicuous black dot at the end of the cell and a sparse scattering of black scales over rest of wing. The hindwings are cream white.

The larvae feed on Cirsium species.
