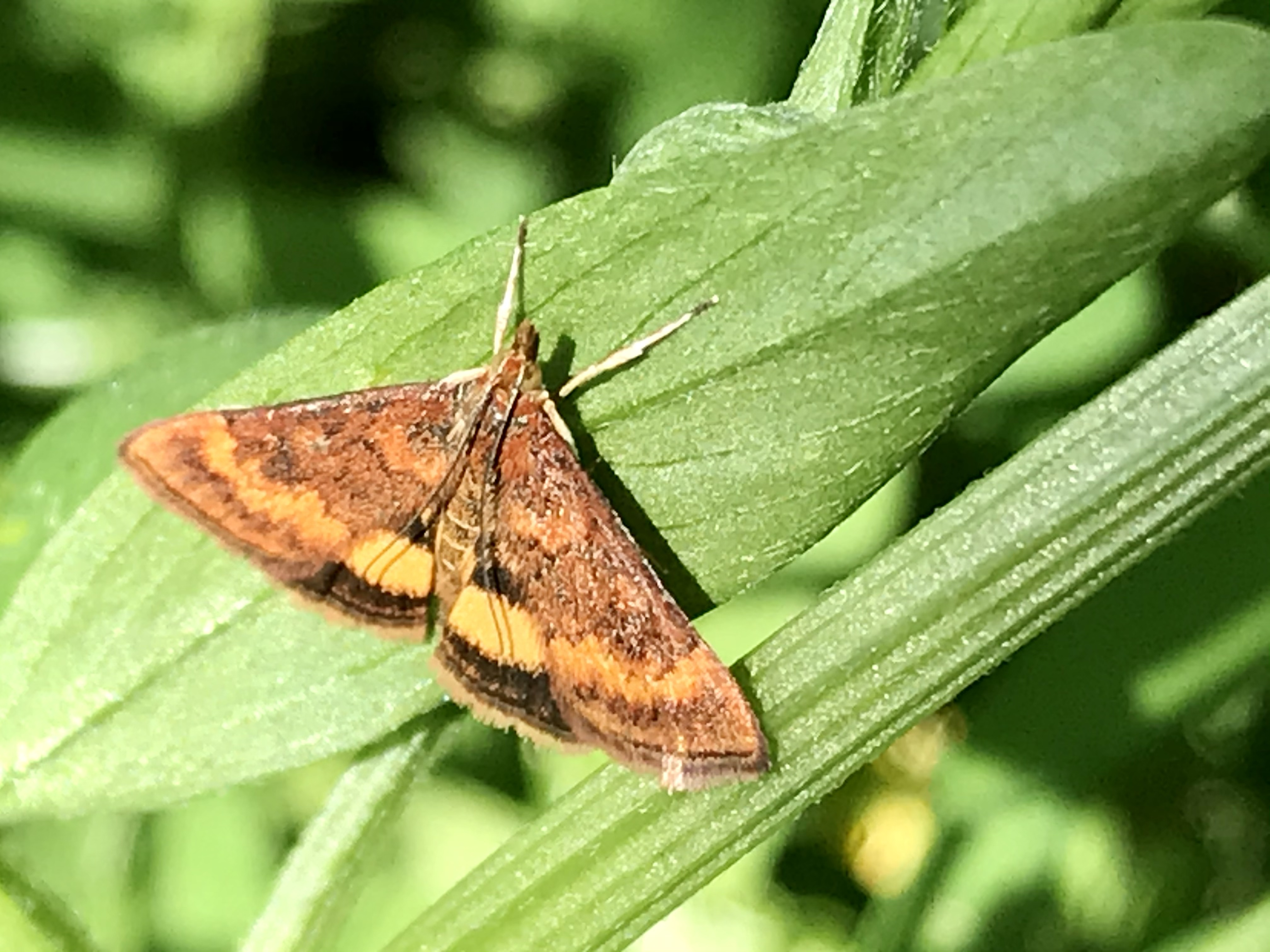

Scientific classification
- Kingdom: Animalia
- Phylum: Arthropoda
- Clade: Pancrustacea
- Class: Insecta
- Order: Lepidoptera
- Family: Crambidae
- Genus: Pyrausta
- Species: P. californicalis

Binomial name
- Pyrausta californicalis (Packard, 1873)

Synonyms
- Botys californicalis Packard, 1873

= Pyrausta californicalis =

Species of moth

Pyrausta californicalis, the California pyrausta moth or Mint Moth, is a moth in the family Crambidae. It was described by Alpheus Spring Packard in 1873. It is found in North America, where it has been recorded from British Columbia to California.

The wingspan is about 13 mm. Adults have been recorded on wing from February to October.

The larvae feed on Mentha species.

== Subspecies ==
- Pyrausta californicalis californicalis
- Pyrausta californicalis sierranalis Munroe, 1976 (California)
