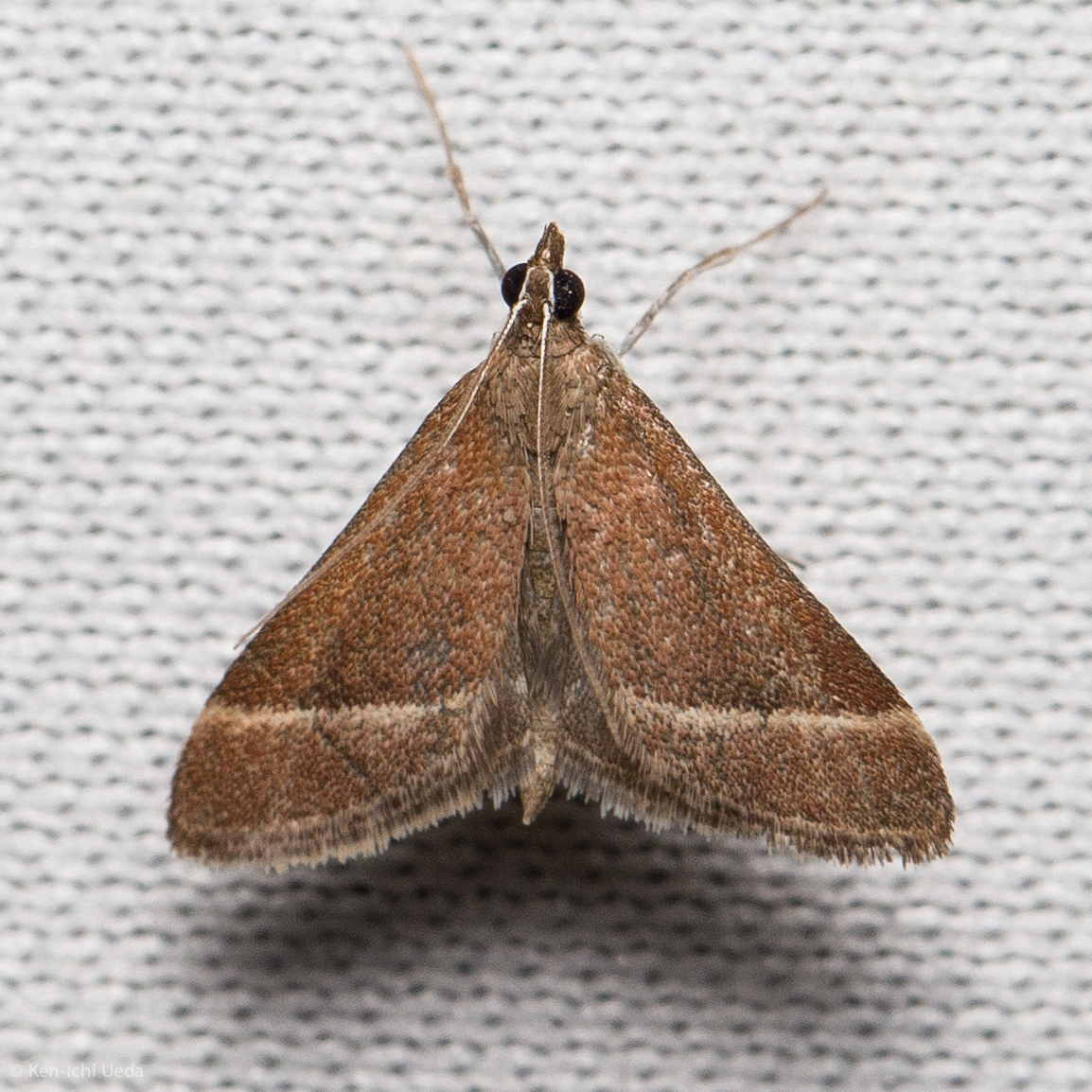

Scientific classification
- Kingdom: Animalia
- Phylum: Arthropoda
- Class: Insecta
- Order: Lepidoptera
- Family: Crambidae
- Genus: Pyrausta
- Species: P. lethalis

Binomial name
- Pyrausta lethalis (Grote, 1881)

Synonyms
- Botis lethalis Grote, 1881

= Pyrausta lethalis =

Species of moth

Pyrausta lethalis, the lethal pyrausta moth, is a moth in the family Crambidae. It was described by Augustus Radcliffe Grote in 1881. It is found in North America, where it has been recorded from California (the Mojave Desert, Los Angeles) to southern Nevada, southern Arizona and Texas (the Big Bend region).

The wingspan is about 16 mm. The forewings are purplish brown with a dark brown exterior line. The subterminal area is pale brown, shaded with whitish. The hindwings are pale fuscous with a black terminal line. Adults have been recorded on wing from March to October.
