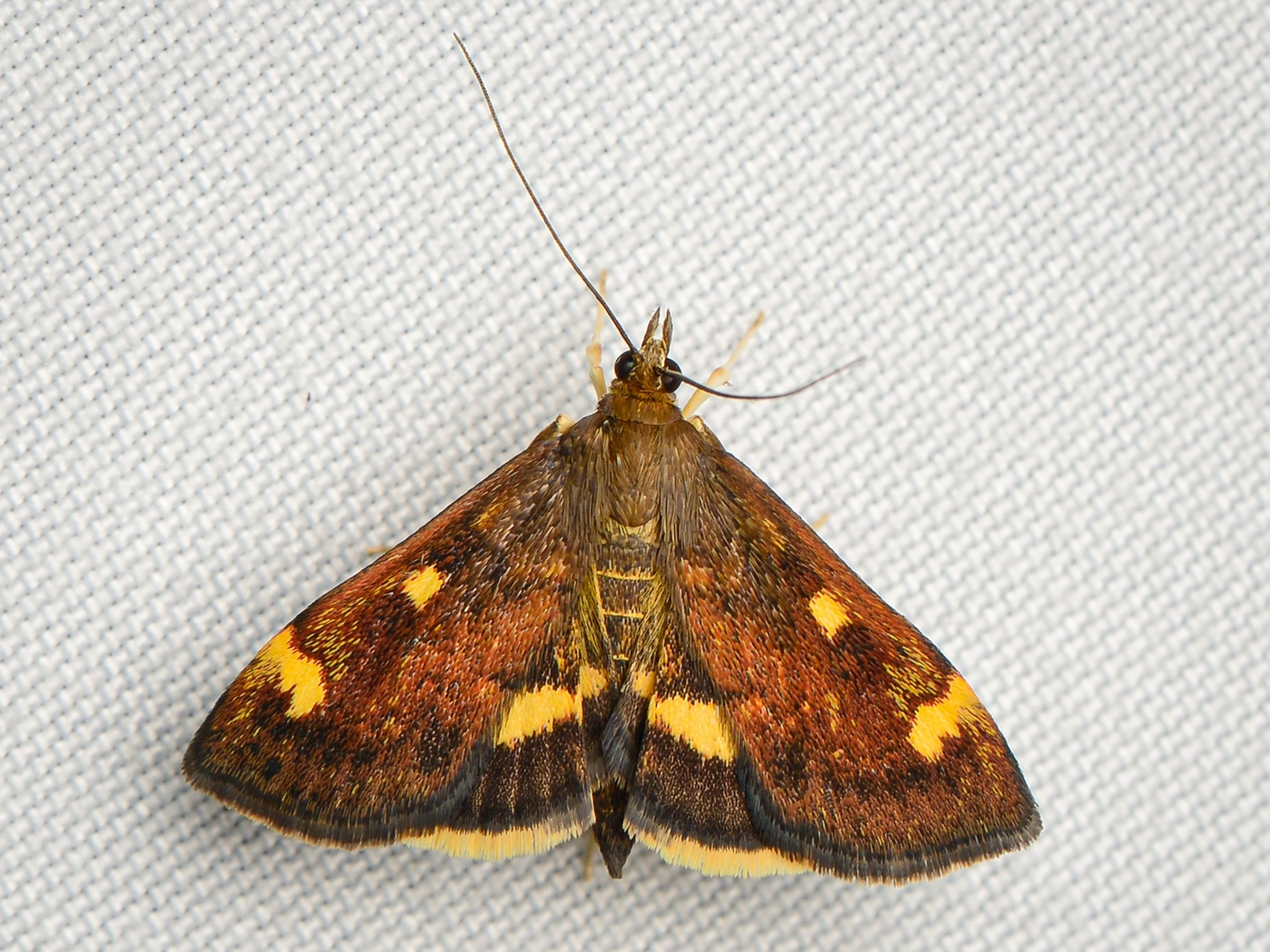

Scientific classification
- Kingdom: Animalia
- Phylum: Arthropoda
- Class: Insecta
- Order: Lepidoptera
- Family: Crambidae
- Genus: Pyrausta
- Species: P. generosa

Binomial name
- Pyrausta generosa (Grote & Robinson, 1867)

Synonyms
- Botys generosa Grote & Robinson, 1867

= Pyrausta generosa =

Species of moth

Pyrausta generosa is a moth in the family Crambidae. It was described by Augustus Radcliffe Grote and Coleman Townsend Robinson in 1867. It is found in North America, where it has been recorded from Ontario to Alberta and to Florida and Missouri. The habitat consists of undisturbed areas in aspen parkland and mixed woods.

The wingspan is 18–21 mm. Adults are on wing from late May to late July.

The larvae possibly feed on Mentha species.
