= Scoparia denigata =

Scientific classification
- Kingdom: Animalia
- Phylum: Arthropoda
- Class: Insecta
- Order: Lepidoptera
- Family: Crambidae
- Genus: Scoparia
- Species: S. denigata

Binomial name
- Scoparia denigata Dyar, 1929

Species of moth

Scoparia denigata is a moth in the family Crambidae. It was described by Harrison Gray Dyar Jr. in 1929. It has been recorded from the US state of Arizona.

The wingspan is 14–18 mm. Adults are light gray brown. Adults have been recorded on wing in August.
