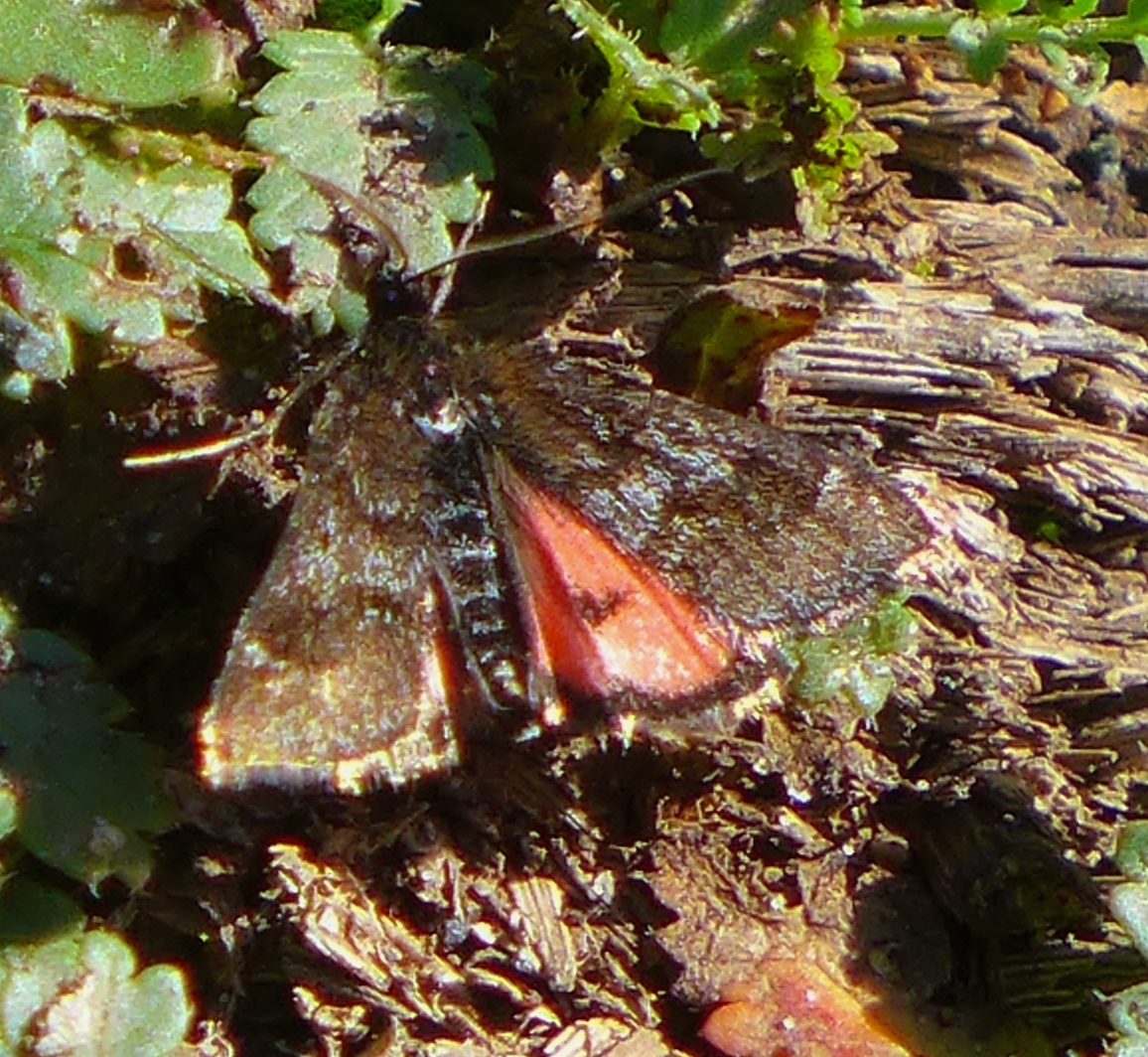

Scientific classification
- Kingdom: Animalia
- Phylum: Arthropoda
- Class: Insecta
- Order: Lepidoptera
- Family: Crambidae
- Genus: Pyrausta
- Species: P. dapalis

Binomial name
- Pyrausta dapalis (Grote, 1881)

Synonyms
- Botis dapalis Grote, 1881

= Pyrausta dapalis =

Species of moth

Pyrausta dapalis is a moth in the family Crambidae. It was described by Augustus Radcliffe Grote in 1881. It is found in western North America, where it has been recorded from California and Oregon.

The length of the forewings is 7–9.5 mm. Adults have been recorded on wing from early January to March.

The larvae have been reared on various Salvia species.
