= Scoparia rigidalis =

Scientific classification
- Kingdom: Animalia
- Phylum: Arthropoda
- Class: Insecta
- Order: Lepidoptera
- Family: Crambidae
- Genus: Scoparia
- Species: S. rigidalis

Binomial name
- Scoparia rigidalis Barnes & McDunnough, 1912

Species of moth

Scoparia rigidalis is a moth in the family Crambidae. It was described by William Barnes and James Halliday McDunnough in 1912. It is found in North America, where it has been recorded from Arizona.

The wingspan is about 22 mm. The forewings are purplish brown, shaded with light gray in the median area. The basal third of the wing is the darkest and is defined outwardly by a pale line from the costa to near the middle of the inner margin. The subterminal line is pale and the terminal area is shaded with black brown with a terminal row of black dots. The hindwings are smoky, paler towards the base and with a discal dot and traces of a pale subterminal line. Adults have been recorded on wing from August to September.
