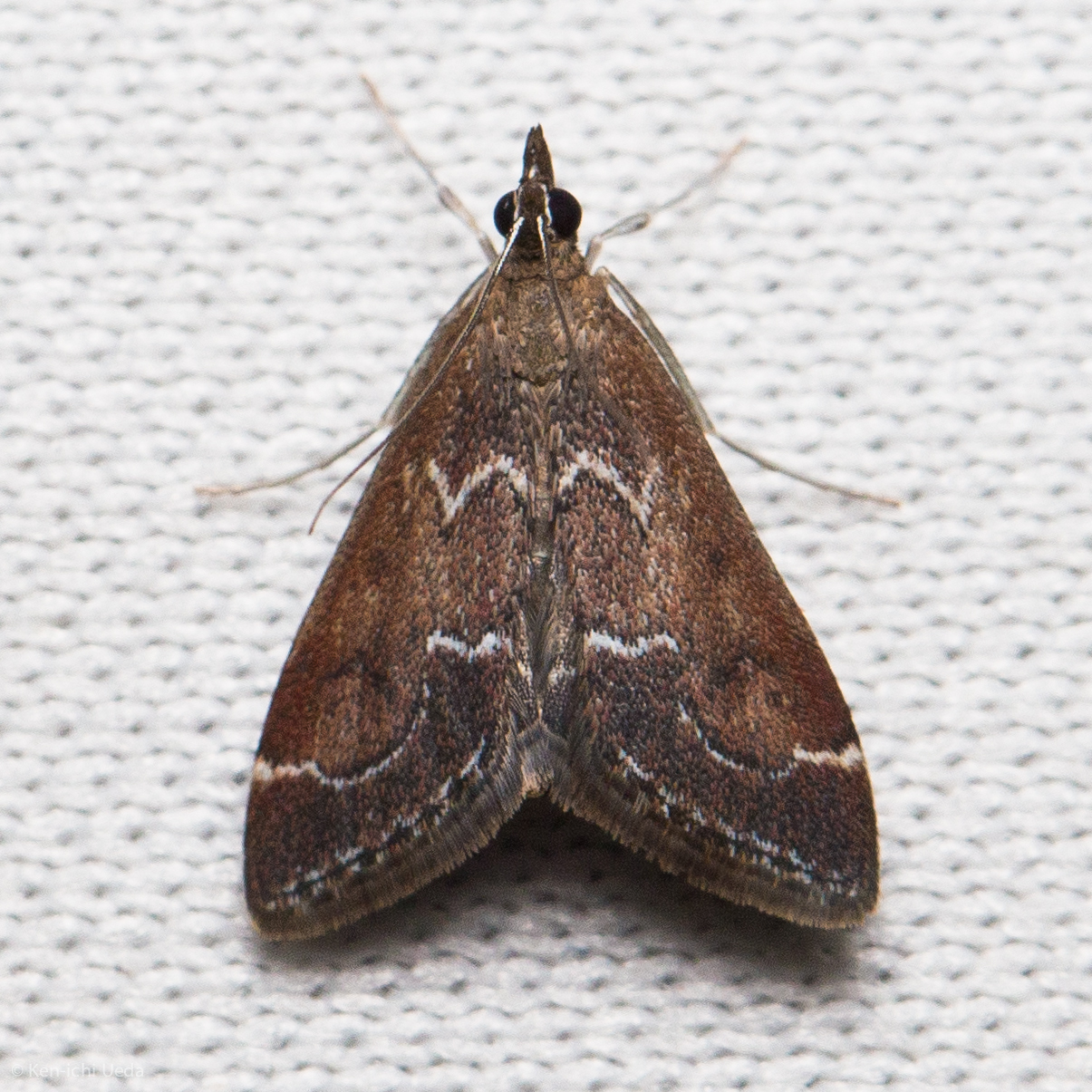

Scientific classification
- Domain: Eukaryota
- Kingdom: Animalia
- Phylum: Arthropoda
- Class: Insecta
- Order: Lepidoptera
- Family: Crambidae
- Genus: Pyrausta
- Species: P. napaealis

Binomial name
- Pyrausta napaealis (Hulst, 1886)

Synonyms
- Paraedis napaealis Hulst, 1886

= Pyrausta napaealis =

Species of moth

Pyrausta napaealis is a moth in the family Crambidae. It was described by George Duryea Hulst in 1886. It is found in the United States, where it has been recorded from Washington to California and west to Arizona, Nevada, New Mexico and Texas. It is also found in northern Mexico.

The wingspan is 17–22 mm (0.67–0.87 in). The forewings are cinereous (ash gray) along the inner and outer margin and fuscous brown along the costa and central space. The hindwings are fuscous with a black marginal line. Adults have been recorded on wing from March to August and in October.
