= Pyrausta atropurpuralis =

Scientific classification
- Kingdom: Animalia
- Phylum: Arthropoda
- Class: Insecta
- Order: Lepidoptera
- Family: Crambidae
- Genus: Pyrausta
- Species: P. atropurpuralis

Binomial name
- Pyrausta atropurpuralis (Grote, 1877)

Synonyms
- Botis atropurpuralis Grote, 1877

Species of moth

Pyrausta atropurpuralis is a moth in the family Crambidae. It was described by Augustus Radcliffe Grote in 1877. It is found in North America, where it has been recorded from Texas, New Mexico and Colorado.

The wingspan is about 15–18 mm. The forewings are reddish brown with a purplish tinge. The hindwings are fuscous, but paler at the base. Adults have been recorded on wing in September.
