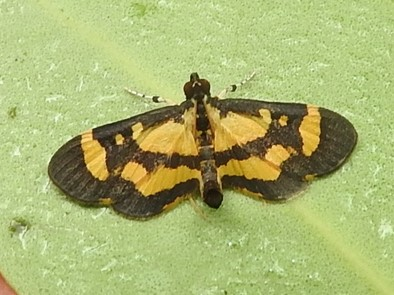

Scientific classification
- Kingdom: Animalia
- Phylum: Arthropoda
- Class: Insecta
- Order: Lepidoptera
- Family: Crambidae
- Genus: Lygropia
- Species: L. fusalis

Binomial name
- Lygropia fusalis Hampson, 1904

Synonyms
- Lypotigris fusalis (Hampson, 1904); Eudiopts fusalis; Nacoleia hampsoni Barnes & McDunnough, 1913

= Lygropia fusalis =

Species of moth

Lygropia fusalis is a species of moth in the family Crambidae. It was described by George Hampson in 1904. It is found on the Bahamas, in Costa Rica, Cuba and Florida.

The wingspan is about 17 mm. Adults have been recorded nearly year round in Florida.
