= List of Geron species =

This is a list of 188 species in Geron, a genus of bee flies in the family Bombyliidae.

== Geron species ==
- Geron aaptis Evenhuis, 1979^{c g}
- Geron ablusus Bowden, 1974^{c g}
- Geron aequalis Painter, 1932^{i c g}
- Geron aesion Evenhuis, 1979^{c g}
- Geron africanus Evenhuis & Greathead, 1999^{c g}
- Geron albarius Painter, 1932^{i c g}
- Geron albescens Brunetti, 1909^{c g}
- Geron albidipennis Loew, 1869^{i c g}
- Geron albidus Walker, 1857^{c g}
- Geron albifacies Bezzi, 1924^{c g}
- Geron albihalteris Evenhuis, 1979^{c g}
- Geron albipilosus Hall & Evenhuis, 2003^{c g}
- Geron albus Cole, 1923^{i c g}
- Geron amboinensis Evenhuis, 1979^{c g}
- Geron anceps Hesse, 1938^{c g}
- Geron anomalus (Hesse, 1938)^{c}
- Geron arenicola Painter, 1932^{i c g}
- Geron argentifrons Brunetti, 1909^{c g}
- Geron argutus Painter, 1932^{i c g}
- Geron aridus Painter, 1932^{i c g}
- Geron articulatus Scarbrough, 1985^{c g}
- Geron asiaticus Zaitzev, 1967^{c g}
- Geron auratus Zaitzev, 1962^{c g}
- Geron auricomus Hall, 1976^{c g}
- Geron australis Macquart, 1840^{c g}
- Geron balpi Evenhuis, 1979^{c g}
- Geron barbatus Bezzi, 1921^{c g}
- Geron basutoensis (Hesse, 1938)^{c}
- Geron bechuanus Hesse, 1936^{c g}
- Geron bezzii (Paramonov, 1930)^{c}
- Geron binatus Scarbrough, 1985^{c g}
- Geron borealis Hall & Evenhuis, 2003^{c g}
- Geron bowdeni Evenhuis, 1979^{c g}
- Geron cabon Evenhuis, 1979^{c g}
- Geron calvus Loew, 1863^{i c g b}
- Geron candidulus Bowden, 1974^{c g}
- Geron canescens Zaitzev, 1962^{c g}
- Geron canus Philippi, 1865^{c g}
- Geron capensis Walker, 1852^{c g}
- Geron capicolus (Hesse, 1938)^{c g}
- Geron cheilicterus (Hesse, 1938)^{c g}
- Geron chrysonotum Evenhuis, 1979^{c g}
- Geron colei Evenhuis, 1978^{i}
- Geron confusus Hall & Evenhuis, 2003^{c g}
- Geron consors (Hesse, 1938)^{c g}
- Geron cressoni Hall & Evenhuis, 2003^{c g}
- Geron curvipennis Zaitzev, 1972^{c g}
- Geron dasycerus (Hesse, 1938)^{c g}
- Geron declinatus Scarbrough, 1985^{c g}
- Geron delicatus Hesse, 1938^{c g}
- Geron dicronus Bigot, 1892^{c g}
- Geron digitarius Cresson, 1919^{i c g}
- Geron dilutus Bowden, 1974^{c g}
- Geron dispar Macquart, 1850^{c g}
- Geron disparilis (Hesse, 1938)^{c}
- Geron dissors Hesse, 1938^{c g}
- Geron dubiosus Hesse, 1938^{c g}
- Geron efflatouni Greathead, 1999^{c g}
- Geron elachys Hall & Evenhuis, 2003^{c g}
- Geron emiliae Zaitzev, 1964^{c g}
- Geron eriogonae Hall & Evenhuis, 2003^{c g}
- Geron erythroccipitalis Evenhuis, 1979^{c g}
- Geron erythropus Bezzi, 1925^{c g}
- Geron europacificus Evenhuis, 1979^{c g}
- Geron exemptus Bowden, 1974^{c g}
- Geron exumae Scarbrough, 1985^{c g}
- Geron farri Scarbrough, 1985^{c g}
- Geron flavocciput Evenhuis, 1979^{c g}
- Geron freidbergi Zaitzev, 1996^{c g}
- Geron fumipennis Evenhuis, 1979^{c g}
- Geron furcifer Hesse, 1938^{c g}
- Geron fuscipes (Hesse, 1938)^{c g}
- Geron fusciscelis Evenhuis, 1979^{c g}
- Geron garagniae Efflatoun, 1945^{c g}
- Geron gariepinus Hesse, 1938^{c g}
- Geron gibbosus (Olivier, 1789)^{c g}
- Geron gilloni Lachaise & Bowden, 1976^{c g}
- Geron grandis Painter, 1932^{i c g}
- Geron griseus Zaitzev, 1962^{c g}
- Geron halli Hall & Evenhuis, 2003^{c g}
- Geron halteralis Wiedemann, 1820^{c g}
- Geron hemifuscis Evenhuis, 1979^{c g}
- Geron hesperidum Frey, 1936^{c g}
- Geron hessei Bowden, 1974^{c g}
- Geron heteropterus (Wiedemann, 1821)^{c g}
- Geron holosericeus Walker, 1849^{i c g}
- Geron hybus Coquillett, 1894^{i c g}
- Geron inflatus Evenhuis, 1979^{c g}
- Geron infrequens Hall & Evenhuis, 2003^{c g}
- Geron intonsus Bezzi, 1925^{c g}
- Geron johnsoni Painter, 1932^{i c g}
- Geron juxtus Bowden, 1974^{c g}
- Geron karakara Evenhuis, 1979^{c g}
- Geron karooanus (Hesse, 1938)^{c g}
- Geron kazabi Zaitzev, 1972^{c g}
- Geron kerzhneri Zaitzev, 1975^{c g}
- Geron kozlovi Zaitzev, 1972^{c g}
- Geron krymensis Paramonov, 1929^{c g}
- Geron lactipennis Hesse, 1938^{c g}
- Geron lasiocornis (Hesse, 1938)^{c g}
- Geron latifrons Hesse, 1938^{c g}
- Geron lepidus Bowden, 1962^{c g}
- Geron leptocerus Bezzi, 1921^{c g}
- Geron litoralis Painter, 1932^{i c g}
- Geron longiventris Efflatoun, 1945^{c g}
- Geron luctuosus Bezzi, 1921^{c g}
- Geron macquarti Greathead, 1999^{c g}
- Geron maculifacies Hesse, 1938^{c g}
- Geron malekulanus Evenhuis, 1979^{c g}
- Geron marius Bowden, 1980^{c g}
- Geron marshalli (Hesse, 1938)^{c g}
- Geron meigeni Greathead, 2001^{c g}
- Geron michaili Zaitzev, 1972^{c g}
- Geron mononensis Evenhuis, 1979^{c g}
- Geron mononesensis Evenhuis, 1979^{c g}
- Geron montanus (Hesse, 1938)^{c g}
- Geron monticola Hall & Evenhuis, 2003^{c g}
- Geron munroi Hesse, 1938^{c g}
- Geron mystacinus Bezzi, 1924^{c g}
- Geron mysticus Evenhuis, 1979^{c g}
- Geron namaensis (Hesse, 1938)^{c}
- Geron nasutus Bezzi, 1924^{c g}
- Geron nephroideus Scarbrough, 1985^{c g}
- Geron neromelanus (Hesse, 1938)^{c g}
- Geron neutralis Evenhuis, 1979^{c g}
- Geron nevadensis Hall & Evenhuis, 2003^{c g}
- Geron nigerrimus Hesse, 1938^{c g}
- Geron nigralis Roberts, 1929^{c g}
- Geron nigrifacies Hesse, 1938^{c g}
- Geron nigrifemoris (Hesse, 1938)^{c}
- Geron nigripes Painter, 1932^{i c g}
- Geron nigrocciput Evenhuis, 1979^{c g}
- Geron niveolus Evenhuis & Greathead, 1999^{c g}
- Geron niveus Cresson, 1919^{i c g}
- Geron nomadicus Hesse, 1938^{c g}
- Geron notios Hall & Evenhuis, 2003^{c g}
- Geron nudus Painter, 1932^{i c g}
- Geron olivierii Macquart, 1840^{c g}
- Geron opacus Bowden, 1971^{c g}
- Geron orthoperus Hesse, 1938^{c g}
- Geron painteri Hall & Evenhuis, 2003^{c g}
- Geron pallipilosus Yang & Yang, 1992^{c g}
- Geron paramonovi Evenhuis, 1979^{c g}
- Geron paraustralicus Evenhuis, 1979^{c g}
- Geron parvidus Painter, 1932^{i c g}
- Geron parvus Hesse, 1938^{c g}
- Geron peringueyi (Hesse, 1938)^{c g}
- Geron peucon Hall & Evenhuis, 2003^{c g}
- Geron phallophorus Bezzi, 1920^{c g}
- Geron philippinensis Evenhuis & Arakaki, 1980^{c g}
- Geron priapeus Bezzi, 1920^{c g}
- Geron prosopidis Hall & Evenhuis, 2003^{c g}
- Geron psammobates Hesse, 1938^{c g}
- Geron ritae Zaitzev, 1996^{c g}
- Geron robertsi Evenhuis, 1979^{c g}
- Geron roborovskii Zaitzev, 1996^{c g}
- Geron robustus Cresson, 1919^{i}
- Geron rufipes Macquart, 1846^{i c g}
- Geron saccharus Bowden, 1974^{c g}
- Geron salmonus Scarbrough & Davidson, 1985^{c g}
- Geron samarus Bowden, 1974^{c g}
- Geron semifuscus Seguy, 1933^{c g}
- Geron senilis (Fabricius, 1794)^{i c}
- Geron seychellarum Greathead, 1983^{c g}
- Geron simplex Walker, 1858^{c g}
- Geron simplicipennis Greathead, 1967^{c g}
- Geron sinensis Yang & Yang, 1992^{c g}
- Geron smirnovi Zaitzev, 1978^{c g}
- Geron snowi Painter, 1932^{i c g}
- Geron sparsus Bowden, 1971^{c g}
- Geron stenos Hall & Evenhuis, 2003^{c g}
- Geron subauratus Loew, 1863^{i c g}
- Geron subflavofemoratus Andreu Rubio, 1959^{c g}
- Geron syriacus Zaitzev, 2002^{c g}
- Geron tenue Walker, 1857^{c g}
- Geron terminatus Evenhuis, 1979^{c g}
- Geron transvaalensis Hesse, 1938^{c g}
- Geron turneri Hesse, 1938^{c g}
- Geron umbripennis Bezzi, 1924^{c g}
- Geron validus Evenhuis, 1989^{c g}
- Geron varicapillis Bowden, 1974^{c g}
- Geron viaticus Bowden, 1974^{c g}
- Geron victolgae Zaitzev, 2004^{c g}
- Geron vitripennis Loew, 1869^{i c g b}
- Geron waltoni (Hesse, 1938)^{c}
- Geron weemsi Hall & Evenhuis, 2003^{c g}
- Geron westralicus Evenhuis, 1979^{c g}
- Geron winburni Painter, 1932^{i c g}

Data sources: i = ITIS, c = Catalogue of Life, g = GBIF, b = Bugguide.net
