= Systropus macer =

Scientific classification
- Kingdom: Animalia
- Phylum: Arthropoda
- Class: Insecta
- Order: Diptera
- Family: Bombyliidae
- Subfamily: Toxophorinae
- Genus: Systropus
- Species: S. macer

Binomial name
- Systropus macer Loew, 1863

Synonyms
- Cephenus imbecillus Karsch, 1880; Cephenus infuscatus Karsch, 1880

Species of fly

Systropus macer is a species of bee fly in the family Bombyliidae. It is found in eastern North America in Ontario, Canada, and in the United States from Massachusetts south to Georgia and Texas. It is a parasitoid of Limacodidae caterpillars, including Adoneta spinuloides, Euclea delphinii, Lithacodes fasciola, Prolimacodes badia, and Parasa indetermina.
