= Systropus bicornis =

Scientific classification
- Domain: Eukaryota
- Kingdom: Animalia
- Phylum: Arthropoda
- Class: Insecta
- Order: Diptera
- Family: Bombyliidae
- Subfamily: Toxophorinae
- Genus: Systropus
- Species: S. bicornis

Binomial name
- Systropus bicornis Painter, 1963

Species of fly

Systropus bicornis is a species of bee fly in the family Bombyliidae. It is found in Mexico.
