= Systropus angulatus =

Scientific classification
- Domain: Eukaryota
- Kingdom: Animalia
- Phylum: Arthropoda
- Class: Insecta
- Order: Diptera
- Family: Bombyliidae
- Subfamily: Toxophorinae
- Genus: Systropus
- Species: S. angulatus

Binomial name
- Systropus angulatus (Karsch, 1880

Synonyms
- Cephenus angulatus Karsch, 1880

Species of fly

Systropus angulatus is a species of bee fly in the family Bombyliidae. It is found in Texas.
