= Dolichomyia gracilis =

Scientific classification
- Domain: Eukaryota
- Kingdom: Animalia
- Phylum: Arthropoda
- Class: Insecta
- Order: Diptera
- Family: Bombyliidae
- Tribe: Systropodini
- Genus: Dolichomyia
- Species: D. gracilis

Binomial name
- Dolichomyia gracilis Williston, 1894

Species of fly

Dolichomyia gracilis is a species of bee flies (insects in the family Bombyliidae).
