= Uramya indita =

Scientific classification
- Kingdom: Animalia
- Phylum: Arthropoda
- Clade: Pancrustacea
- Class: Insecta
- Order: Diptera
- Family: Tachinidae
- Subfamily: Dexiinae
- Tribe: Uramyini
- Genus: Uramya
- Species: U. indita

Binomial name
- Uramya indita (Walker, 1861)

Synonyms
- Lydella indita Walker, 1861; Pseudeuantha linelii Townsend, 1915; Tricoliga caloptera Bigot, 1889

Species of fly

Uramya indita is a species of fly in the family Tachinidae.

== Distribution ==
United States, Mexico, El Salvador.
