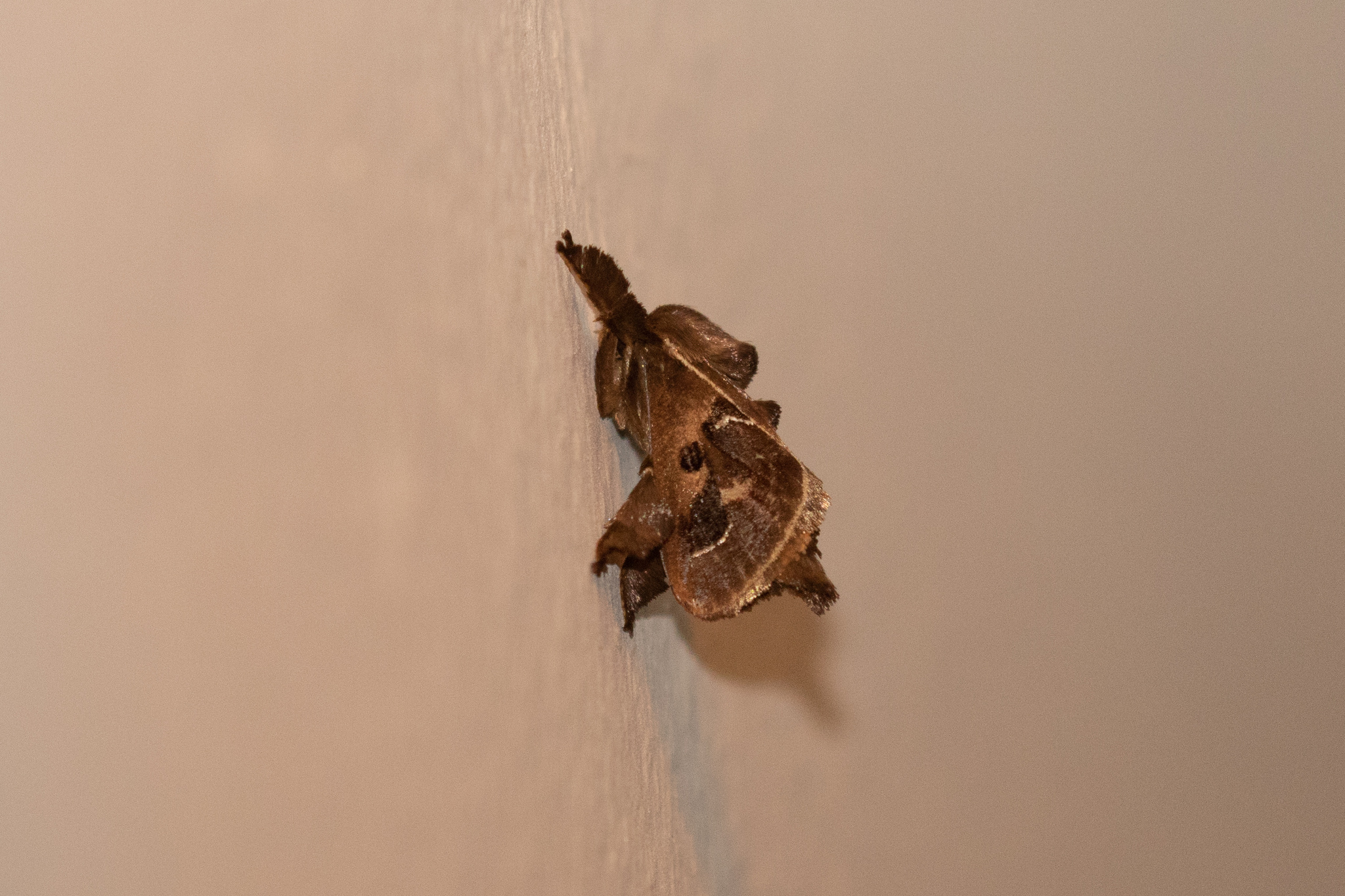

Scientific classification
- Kingdom: Animalia
- Phylum: Arthropoda
- Clade: Pancrustacea
- Class: Insecta
- Order: Lepidoptera
- Family: Limacodidae
- Genus: Euclea
- Species: E. gajentaani

Binomial name
- Euclea gajentaani (Epstein & Corrales, 2004)

= Euclea gajentaani =

Costa Rican moth

Euclea gajentaani is a moth in the family Limacodidae (the slug caterpillar moths). The species was first described by entomologists Marc Epstein and Jorge Corrales in 2004. The species was named for Henricus Gajentaan, Ambassador of the Netherlands to Costa Rica.

== Range ==
Euclea gajentaani has only been observed in Costa Rica between 700 and 1200 m on the Caribbean slope.

== Life cycle ==
=== Larva ===
This is a colorful yellow-green caterpillar with five oval spots on its back, with patches of spines typical of Euclea caterpillars.

=== Adult ===
Euclea gajentaani is a red-brown moth with a forewing length of 10.5–12.0 mm in males and 16.0 mm in females. Adults of Euclea gajentaani cannot be separated from Euclea diversa without dissection and analysis of genitalia, though the two species seem to be allopatric.

== Host plants ==
This species has been found feeding on a variety of plants including Ocotea insularis, Andira inermis, Machaerium acuminatum, Inga oerstediana, and Quassia amara.
