= Toxophora leucopyga =

Scientific classification
- Domain: Eukaryota
- Kingdom: Animalia
- Phylum: Arthropoda
- Class: Insecta
- Order: Diptera
- Family: Bombyliidae
- Genus: Toxophora
- Species: T. leucopyga

Binomial name
- Toxophora leucopyga Wiedemann, 1828

Synonyms
- Toxophora fulva Gray and Pidgeon, 1832

Species of fly

Toxophora leucopyga is a species of bee fly in the family Bombyliidae. It is found in the southeastern United States from Louisiana to North Carolina
