= Systropus arizonicus =

Scientific classification
- Domain: Eukaryota
- Kingdom: Animalia
- Phylum: Arthropoda
- Class: Insecta
- Order: Diptera
- Family: Bombyliidae
- Genus: Systropus
- Species: S. arizonicus

Binomial name
- Systropus arizonicus Banks, 1909

Species of fly

Systropus arizonicus is a species of bee fly in the family Bombyliidae. It is found in Mexico and Arizona.
