= Toxophora virgata =

Scientific classification
- Domain: Eukaryota
- Kingdom: Animalia
- Phylum: Arthropoda
- Class: Insecta
- Order: Diptera
- Family: Bombyliidae
- Genus: Toxophora
- Species: T. virgata

Binomial name
- Toxophora virgata Osten Sacken, 1877

Species of fly

Toxophora virgata is a species of bee fly in the family Bombyliidae. It is found from Mexico through most of the western United States north to Canada. Hosts include potter wasps from the genera Odynerus and Stenodynerus.
