= Uramya brasiliensis =

Scientific classification
- Kingdom: Animalia
- Phylum: Arthropoda
- Class: Insecta
- Order: Diptera
- Family: Tachinidae
- Subfamily: Dexiinae
- Tribe: Uramyini
- Genus: Uramya
- Species: U. brasiliensis

Binomial name
- Uramya brasiliensis (Robineau-Desvoidy, 1830)

Synonyms
- Olinda brasiliensis Robineau-Desvoidy, 1830

Species of fly

Uramya brasiliensis is a species of fly in the family Tachinidae.

== Distribution ==
Brazil.
