= Uramya =

Scientific classification
- Kingdom: Animalia
- Phylum: Arthropoda
- Clade: Pancrustacea
- Class: Insecta
- Order: Diptera
- Family: Tachinidae
- Subfamily: Dexiinae
- Tribe: Uramyini
- Genus: Uramya; Robineau-Desvoidy, 1830

Type species
- Uramya producta Robineau-Desvoidy, 1830

Synonyms
- Anaporia Townsend, 1919; Aporia Macquart, 1846; Aporomyia Schiner, 1868; Gymnaporia Townsend, 1919; Neaporia Townsend, 1908; Orthaporia Townsend, 1919; Oxydexia Bigot, 1885; Paraporia Townsend, 1912; Procleonice Townsend, 1935; Pseudeuantha Townsend, 1915; Thelairomima Townsend, 1935; Uramyia Macquart, 1843; Uromacquartia Townsend, 1916; Uromyia Meigen, 1838

Genus of flies

Uramya is a genus of flies in the family Tachinidae.

== Species ==
- Uramya acuminata (Wulp, 1890)
- Uramya albosetulosa Fleming & Wood, 2017
- Uramya aldrichi Reinhard, 1935
- Uramya brasiliensis (Robineau-Desvoidy, 1830)
- Uramya brevicauda Curran, 1934
- Uramya caudata (Schiner, 1868)
- Uramya constricta Fleming & Wood, 2017
- Uramya contraria Fleming & Wood, 2017
- Uramya elegans (Giglio-Tos, 1893)
- Uramya fasciata (Macquart, 1848)
- Uramya halisidotae (Townsend, 1916)
- Uramya hariola Reinhard, 1961
- Uramya indita (Walker, 1861)
- Uramya infracta Fleming & Wood, 2017
- Uramya insolita Guimarães, 1980
- Uramya lativittata Fleming & Wood, 2017
- Uramya limacodis (Townsend, 1892)
- Uramya longa (Walker, 1853)
- Uramya lunula Fleming & Wood, 2017
- Uramya nitens (Schiner, 1868)
- Uramya nitida Fleming & Wood, 2017
- Uramya nubilis (Townsend, 1929)
- Uramya octomaculata (Townsend, 1919)
- Uramya pannosa Fleming & Wood, 2017
- Uramya penai Guimarães, 1980
- Uramya penicillata Fleming & Wood, 2017
- Uramya pictipennis (Townsend, 1935)
- Uramya plaumanni Guimarães, 1980
- Uramya pristis (Walker, 1849)
- Uramya producta Robineau-Desvoidy, 1830
- Uramya quadrimaculata (Macquart, 1846)
- Uramya rubripes (Aldrich, 1921)
- Uramya sermyla Walker, 1849
- Uramya setiventris (Wulp, 1890)
- Uramya sibinivora Guimarães, 1980
- Uramya townsendi Guimarães, 1980
- Uramya trinitatis (Thompson, 1963)
- Uramya umbratilis (Reinhard, 1935)
- Uramya venusta (Wulp, 1890)
