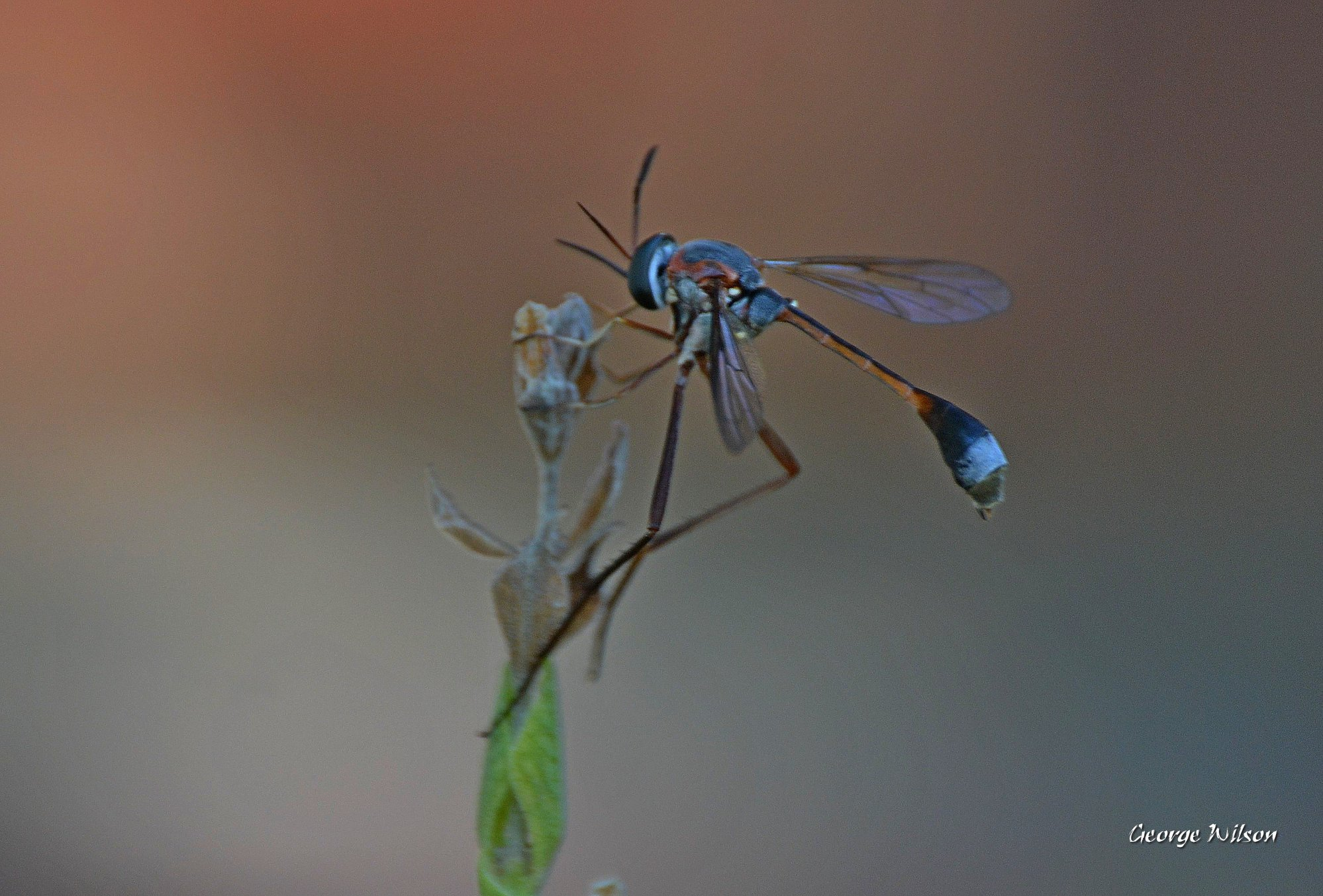

Scientific classification
- Domain: Eukaryota
- Kingdom: Animalia
- Phylum: Arthropoda
- Class: Insecta
- Order: Diptera
- Family: Bombyliidae
- Subfamily: Toxophorinae
- Genus: Systropus; Wiedemann, 1920

Synonyms
- Systropus macilentus Wiedemann, 1920

= Systropus =

Genus of flies

Systropus is a genus of bee flies in the family Bombyliidae. There are over 200 described species in the genus Systropus, found on every continent except Antarctica.

== Species ==
- S. ammophiloides Townsend, 1901
- S. angulatus (Karsch, 1880
- S. arizonicus Banks, 1909
- S. basilaris Painter, 1963
- S. bicornis Painter, 1963
- S. dolorosus Williston, 1901
- S. lugubris Osten Sacken, 1887
- S. macer Loew, 1863
- S. macilentus Wiedemann, 1920
- S. nigripes Painter, 1963
- S. paloides Painter, 1963
- S. pulcher Williston, 1901
- S. rufiventris Osten Sacken, 1887
- S. sallei A. Costa, 1865
- S. semialbus Painter, 1963
- S. similis Williston, 1901
- S. vicinus Painter, 1963
