= Toxophora pellucida =

Scientific classification
- Domain: Eukaryota
- Kingdom: Animalia
- Phylum: Arthropoda
- Class: Insecta
- Order: Diptera
- Family: Bombyliidae
- Genus: Toxophora
- Species: T. pellucida

Binomial name
- Toxophora pellucida Coquillett, 1886

Species of fly

Toxophora pellucida is a species of bee fly in the family Bombyliidae. It is found from Mexico through most of the western United States north to Canada.
