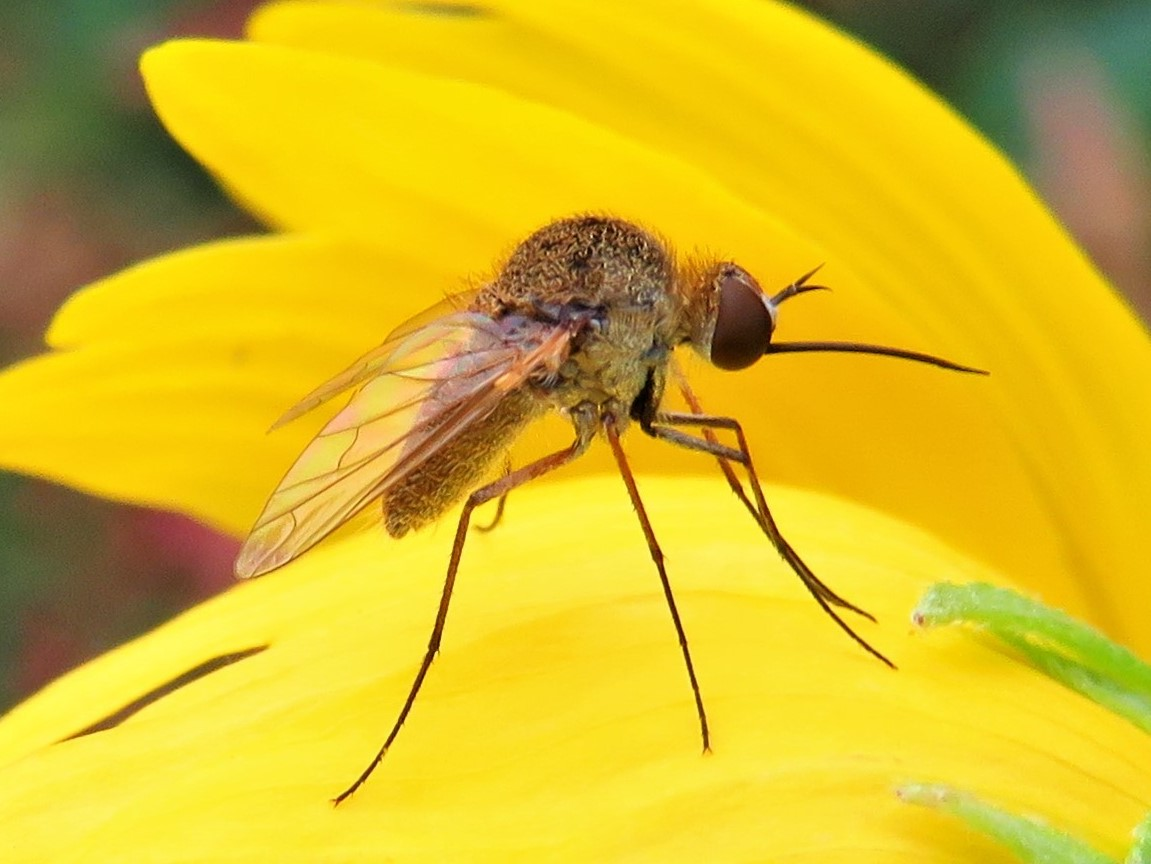

Scientific classification
- Domain: Eukaryota
- Kingdom: Animalia
- Phylum: Arthropoda
- Class: Insecta
- Order: Diptera
- Family: Bombyliidae
- Genus: Geron
- Species: G. vitripennis

Binomial name
- Geron vitripennis Loew, 1869

= Geron vitripennis =

Species of fly

Geron vitripennis is a species of bee fly in the family Bombyliidae. It is found across most of the United States, north into Ontario, and south into Mexico.
