= Uramya halisidotae =

Scientific classification
- Kingdom: Animalia
- Phylum: Arthropoda
- Class: Insecta
- Order: Diptera
- Family: Tachinidae
- Subfamily: Dexiinae
- Tribe: Uramyini
- Genus: Uramya
- Species: U. halisidotae

Binomial name
- Uramya halisidotae (Townsend, 1916)

Synonyms
- Uromacquartia halisidotae Townsend, 1916

Species of fly

Uramya halisidotae is a species of fly in the family Tachinidae. It is a parasitoid of Lophocampa argentata.

== Distribution ==
Canada, United States, Mexico.
