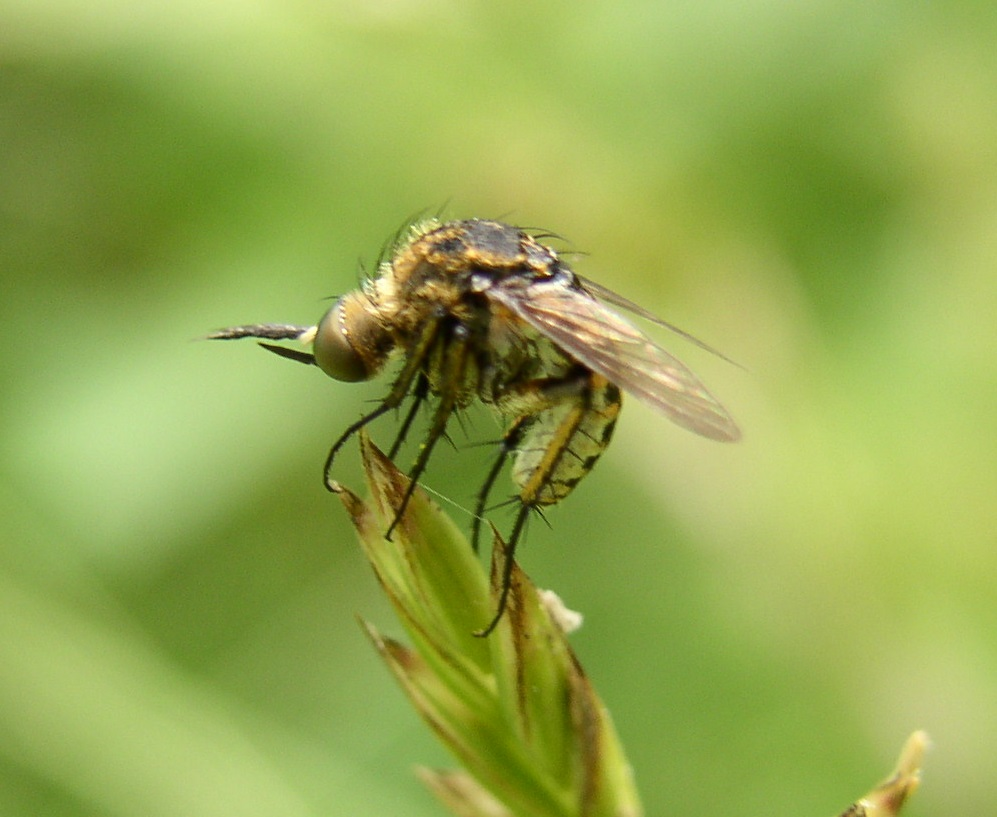
- Toxophora amphitea

Scientific classification
- Kingdom: Animalia
- Phylum: Arthropoda
- Class: Insecta
- Order: Diptera
- Family: Bombyliidae
- Subfamily: Toxophorinae
- Genus: Toxophora; Meigen, 1803

Type species
- Asilus fasciculatus Villers, 1789

Synonyms
- Eniconevra Macquart, 1840; Heniconevra Agassiz, 1846; Heniconeura Bezzi, 1903; Toxomyia Hull, 1973; Enicocera

= Toxophora =

Genus of flies

Toxophora is a genus of flies belonging to the family Bombyliidae (bee-flies). There are about 47 described species, distributed throughout the world, although they are most abundant in Southwestern United States and western Mediterranean. They are stout, robust flies with a hunchbacked form, with a body length of 6–12 mm and wings 4 to 7.5mm. Most species are black with banding or spots.

Larvae are parasitoids of solitary wasps and bees, especially in the family Vespidae.

== Species ==
- T. aegyptiaca Efflatoun, 1945 (Afrotropical: Sudan. Palaearctic: Egypt, Oman, Saudi Arabia)
- T. albivittata Bowden, 1964 (Afrotropical: Ghana, Ivory Coast)
- T. albonotata Loew in Alayo & Garcia Avila, 1983
- T. americana Guérin-Méneville, 1835 (Nearctic)
- T. amicula Séguy, 1930 (Neotropical: Argentina)
- T. amphitea Walker, 1849 (Nearctic: Canada (Ontario), Mexico (Guerrero, Sonora), USA (Florida, Maryland, Missouri, Texas))
- T. fucata Osten Sacken, 1877 (Nearctic: Mexico (Guerrero, Sonora), USA (District of Columbia, Florida, Maryland, Missouri, Texas))
- T. turkestanica var. angusta Paramonov, 1933 (Palaearctic: Tajikistan, Turkmenistan, Uzbekistan)
- T. aurea Macquart, 1848 (Brazil (Paraná))
- T. aurifera Rondani, 1848 (Brazil or Uruguay)
- T. dryitis Séguy, 1930 (French Guiana)
- T. verona Curran, 1934 (Neotropical: Brazil (Acre, Paraná, Roraima), French Guiana, Guyana)
- T. australis Hesse, 1938 (Afrotropical: Lesotho, Namibia, South Africa (Eastern Cape, Northern Cape, Western Cape))
- T. bezzii Paramonov, 1933 (Palaearctic: Egypt, Israel)
- T. carcelii Guérin-Méneville, 1830 (Afrotropical: Ghana, Ivory Coast, Senegal)
- T. coeruleiventris Karsch, 1887 (Afrotropical: Botswana, Burundi, Kenya, Mozambique, Senegal, South Africa (KwaZulu-Natal, Mpumalanga, Northern Province), Sudan, Tanzania, Uganda, Zambia, Zimbabwe)
- T. compta Roberts, 1929 (Australasian/Oceanian: Australia (Queensland))
- T. crocisops Hesse, 1938 (Afrotropical: Namibia, South Africa (Western Cape))
- T. cupreus (Fabricius, 1787) (Nearctic: Mexico (Morelos, Nayarit). Neotropical: Brazil (Goiás, Mato Grosso, Pará), Colombia, French Guiana, Panama, Suriname)
- T. deserta Paramonov, 1933 (Turkmenistan)
- T. tadzhikorum Paramonov, 1933 (Palaearctic: Iran, Tajikistan, Turkmenistan, Uzbekistan)
- T. diploptera Speiser, 1910 (Tanzania)
- T. cyanolepida Hesse, 1938 (Afrotropical: Botswana, Kenya, Namibia, South Africa (Eastern Cape, KwaZulu-Natal, Mpumalanga, Northern Province, Western Cape), Tanzania, Zimbabwe)
- T. emeljanovi Zaitzev, 1980 (Palaearctic: Mongolia)
- T. epargyra Hermann, 1907 (Afrotropical: Sudan. Palaearctic: Armenia, Azerbaijan, Egypt, Gruzia, Syria, Tajikistan, Turkey, Turkmenistan, Uzbekistan)
- T. epargyroides Hesse, 1938 (Afrotropical: ?Kenya, Namibia, Tanzania, Zimbabwe)
- T. fasciculatus (Villers, 1789) (Afrotropical: Sudan. Palaearctic: Algeria, Armenia, Austria, Azerbaijan, Bulgaria, Croatia, Cyprus, Czech Republic, Egypt, France (incl. Corsica), Germany, Greece (incl. Zakynthos), Gruzia, Hungary, Iran, Israel, Italy (incl. Sicily), Kazakhstan, Kyrgyz Republic, Lebanon, Libya, Moldova, Morocco, Romania, Russia (SET), Slovakia, Slovenia, Spain, Switzerland, Tajikistan, Turkey, Turkmenistan, Ukraine, Uzbekistan)
- T. fusca Gray in Griffiths & Pidgeon, 1832 (Patria Ignota)
- T. fuscipennis (Macquart, 1840) (Palaearctic: Algeria, France)
- T. gittinsi Tabet, 2001 (Nearctic: USA (Idaho))
- T. iavana Wiedemann, 1821 (Oriental: China (Fujian), India (Tamil Nadu, Uttar Pradesh, West Bengal), Hong Kong, Indonesia (Java, Nusa Tenggara), Laos, Malaysia (Peninsular), Philippines. Palaearctic: China)
- T. lebedevi Paramonov, 1925 (Palaearctic: Kazakhstan, Turkmenistan, Uzbekistan)
- T. lepidocera (d’Andretta & Carrera, 1950) (Neotropical: Brazil (Pará, São Paulo))
- T. leucon Séguy, 1930 (Neotropical: Argentina, Bolivia, Paraguay)
- T. leucopyga Wiedemann, 1828 (Nearctic: USA (Alabama, Florida, Georgia, Louisiana, North Carolina))
- T. leyladea Efflatoun, 1945 (Afrotropical: Sudan. Palaearctic: Egypt)
- T. maculipennis Karsch, 1886 (Afrotropical: Angola, Congo, Equatorial Guinea, Ghana, Ivory Coast, Senegal)
- T. maxima Coquillett, 1886 (Nearctic: Canada (British Columbia), Mexico (Baja California Norte, Baja California Sur, Tiburon I.), USA (Arizona, California, Idaho, Kansas, New Mexico, Oklahoma, Oregon, Texas))
- T. obliquisquamosa Hesse, 1938 (Afrotropical: Botswana, Namibia, South Africa (Eastern Cape, Western Cape))
- T. pallida d’Andretta & Carrera, 1950 (Neotropical: Brazil (Ceará))
- T. pellucida Coquillett, 1886 (Nearctic: Canada (Alberta, British Columbia), Mexico (Baja California Sur), USA (Arizona, California, Colorado, Idaho, Kansas, Nevada, New Mexico, Oklahoma, Oregon, Texas, Washington))
- T. psammophila Paramonov, 1933 (Palaearctic: Armenia, Azerbaijan, Gruzia, Kyrgyz Republic, Tajikistan, Turkmenistan, Uzbekistan.punctipennis)
- T. punctipennis Bezzi, 1921 (Afrotropical: Namibia, South Africa (KwaZulu-Natal), Zimbabwe)
- T. quadricellulata Hesse, 1963 (Afrotropical: Namibia, South Africa (Northern Cape, Western Cape))
- T. seyrigi Séguy, 1934 (Palaearctic: Armenia, Azerbaijan, Cyprus, Gruzia)
- T. travassosi (d’Andretta & Carrera, 1950) (Neotropical: Brazil (São Paulo))
- T. tristis (Séguy, 1930) (Neotropical: Cuba)
- T. trivittata Bezzi, 1908 (Afrotropical: Congo, Guinea-Bissau, Nigeria)
- T. turkestanica Paramonov, 1933 (Palaearctic: Tajikistan, Turkmenistan, Uzbekistan)
- T. varipennis Williston, 1901 (Nearctic: Mexico (Colima, Guerrero, Morelos, Veracruz-Llave).Neotropical: Guatemala)
- T. vasta Coquillett, 1891 (Nearctic: USA (Arizona, California, Colorado, Nevada))
- T. virgata Osten Sacken, 1877 (Nearctic: Canada (British Columbia), Mexico (Baja California Sur, Sonora), USA (Arizona, California, Colorado, Georgia, Idaho, Nevada, New Mexico, Oklahoma, Texas, Utah))
- T. vitripennis Bezzi, 1924 (Afrotropical: Uganda)
- T. zikani (d’Andretta & Carrera, 1950) (Neotropical: Brazil (Rio de Janeiro))
