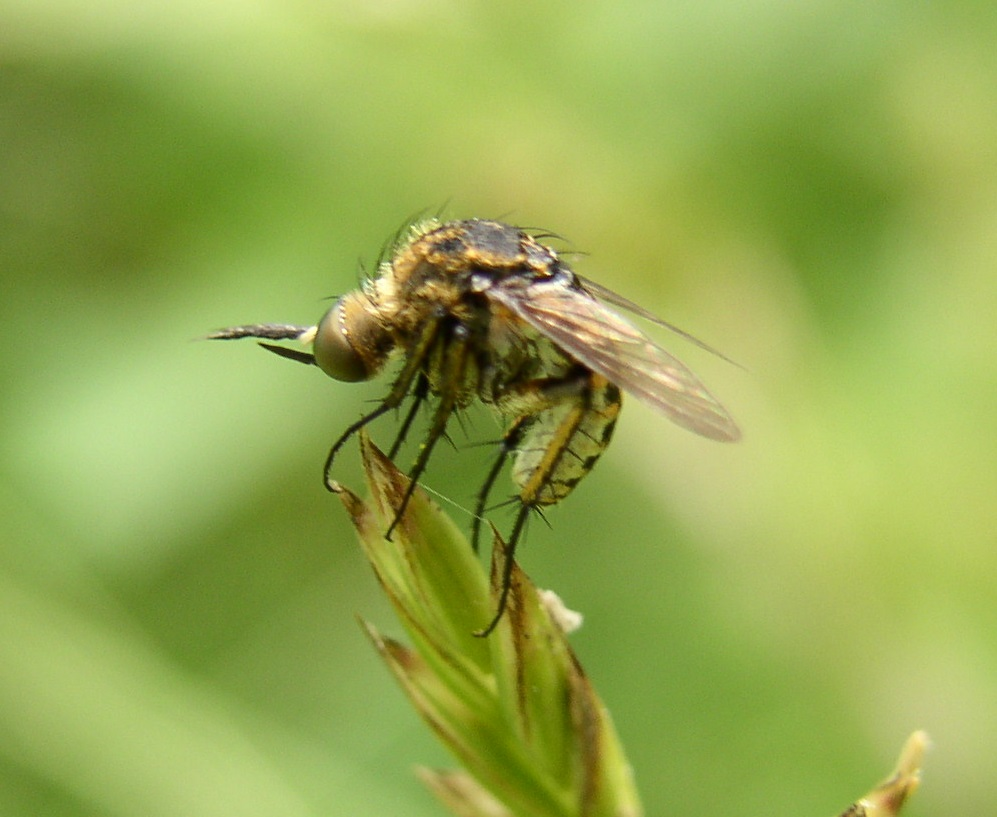

Scientific classification
- Kingdom: Animalia
- Phylum: Arthropoda
- Class: Insecta
- Order: Diptera
- Family: Bombyliidae
- Genus: Toxophora
- Species: T. amphitea

Binomial name
- Toxophora amphitea Walker, 1849

= Toxophora amphitea =

Species of fly

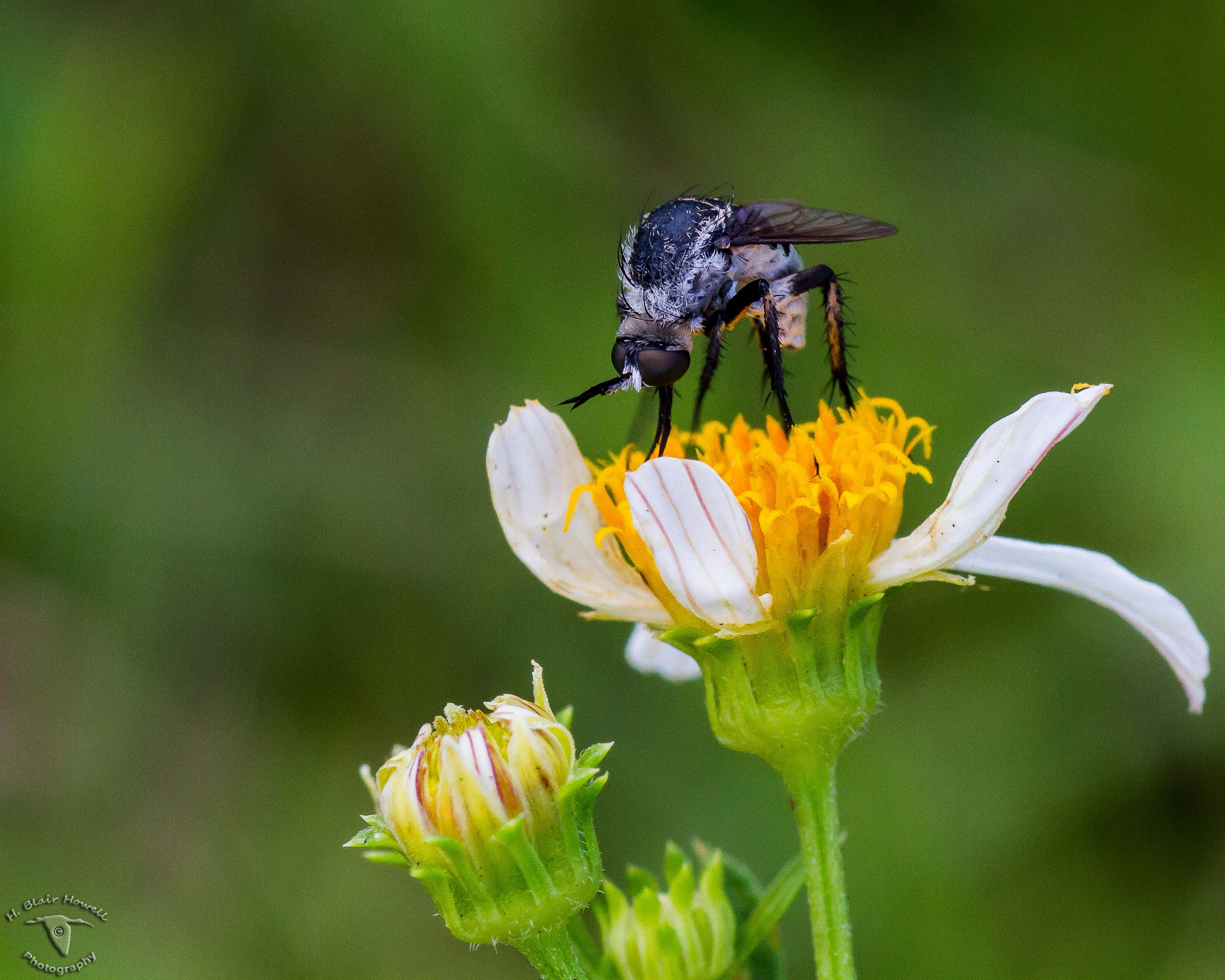
Toxophora amphitea on Spanish needles (Bidens alba) in Central Florida.

Toxophora amphitea is a species of bee fly in the family Bombyliidae. It is found in eastern North America from Ontario south to Florida and Texas.
