= Euclea nanina =

Scientific classification
- Kingdom: Animalia
- Phylum: Arthropoda
- Clade: Pancrustacea
- Class: Insecta
- Order: Lepidoptera
- Family: Limacodidae
- Genus: Euclea
- Species: E. nanina

Binomial name
- Euclea nanina Dyar, 1899

Species of moth

Euclea nanina, the nanina oak-slug moth, is a species of slug caterpillar moth in the family Limacodidae.
