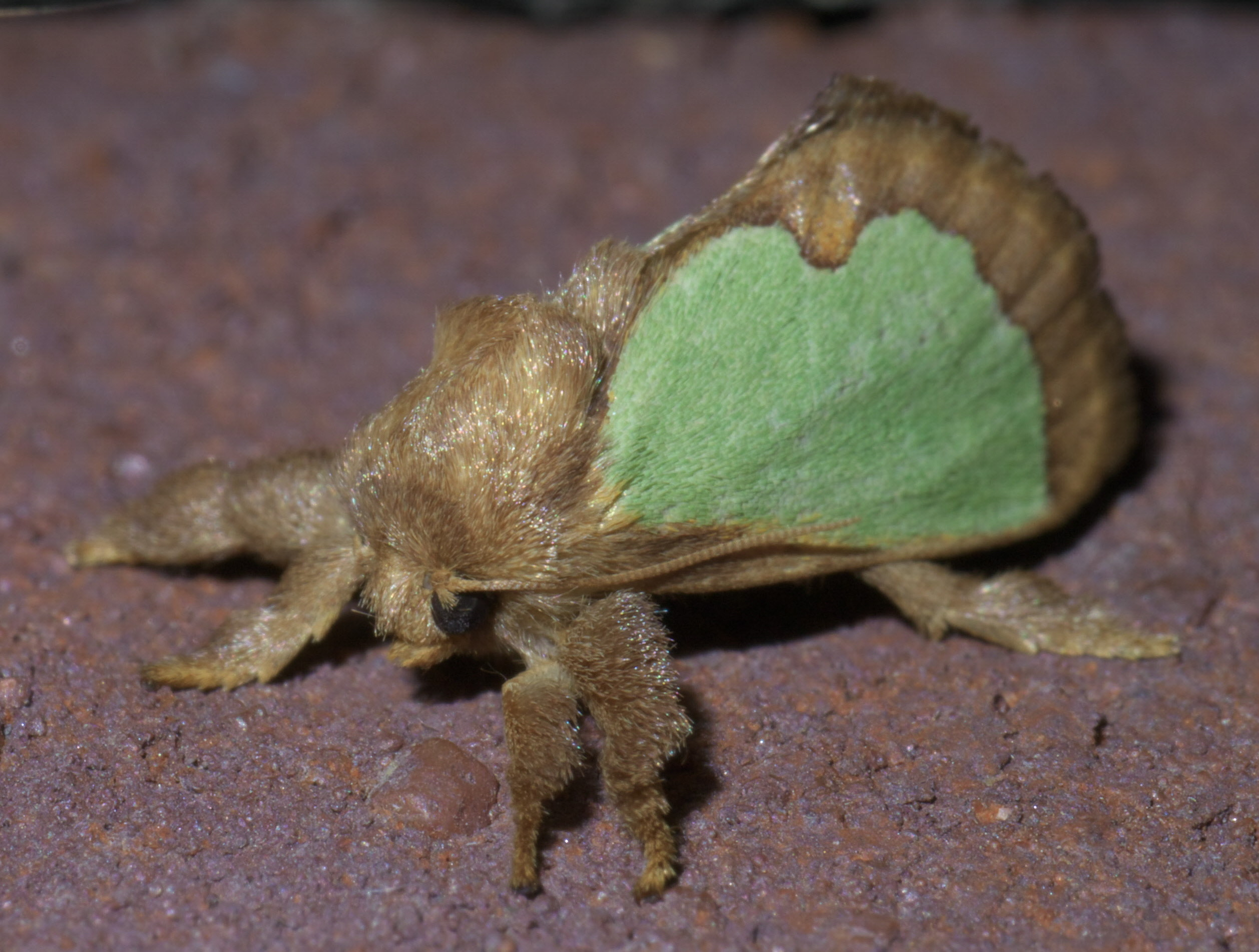

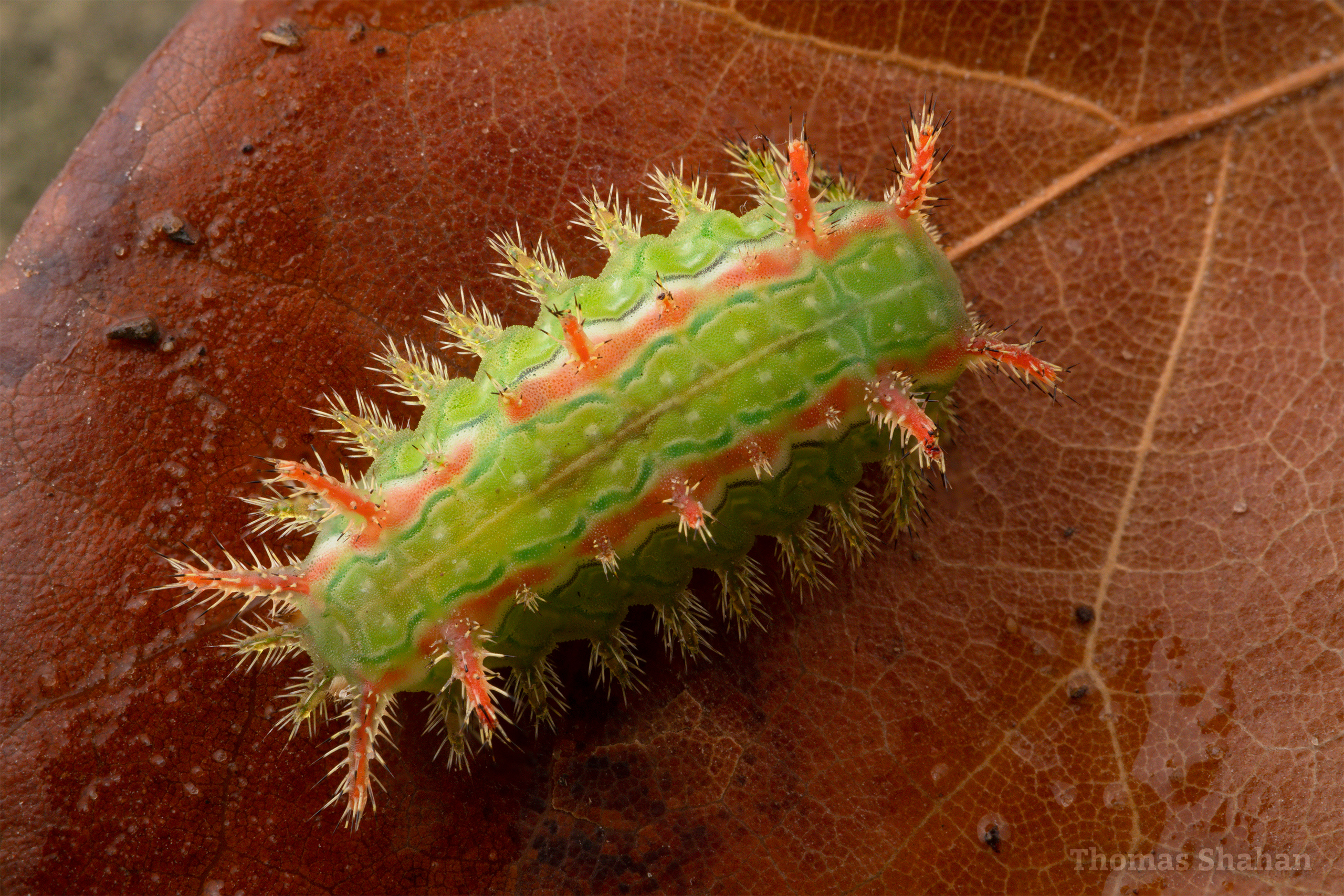
- Adult (top) and larva (bottom)

Scientific classification
- Domain: Eukaryota
- Kingdom: Animalia
- Phylum: Arthropoda
- Class: Insecta
- Order: Lepidoptera
- Family: Limacodidae
- Genus: Euclea
- Species: E. incisa

Binomial name
- Euclea incisa Harv., 1876

= Euclea incisa =

Species of moth

Euclea incisa is a species of slug caterpillar moth in the family Limacodidae.
