= Uramya producta =

Scientific classification
- Kingdom: Animalia
- Phylum: Arthropoda
- Class: Insecta
- Order: Diptera
- Family: Tachinidae
- Subfamily: Dexiinae
- Tribe: Uramyini
- Genus: Uramya
- Species: U. producta

Binomial name
- Uramya producta (Bigot, 1885)

Synonyms
- Oxydexia acuminata Bigot, 1885

Species of fly

Uramya producta is a species of fly in the family Tachinidae.

== Distribution ==
Mexico, Bolivia, Brazil, Paraguay.
