= Geron calvus =

Scientific classification
- Domain: Eukaryota
- Kingdom: Animalia
- Phylum: Arthropoda
- Class: Insecta
- Order: Diptera
- Family: Bombyliidae
- Genus: Geron
- Species: G. calvus

Binomial name
- Geron calvus Loew, 1863

Synonyms
- Geron macropterus Loew, 1869

Species of fly

Geron calvus is a species of bee fly in the family Bombyliidae. It is found in the northeastern United States from Virginia north to Ontario, Canada.
