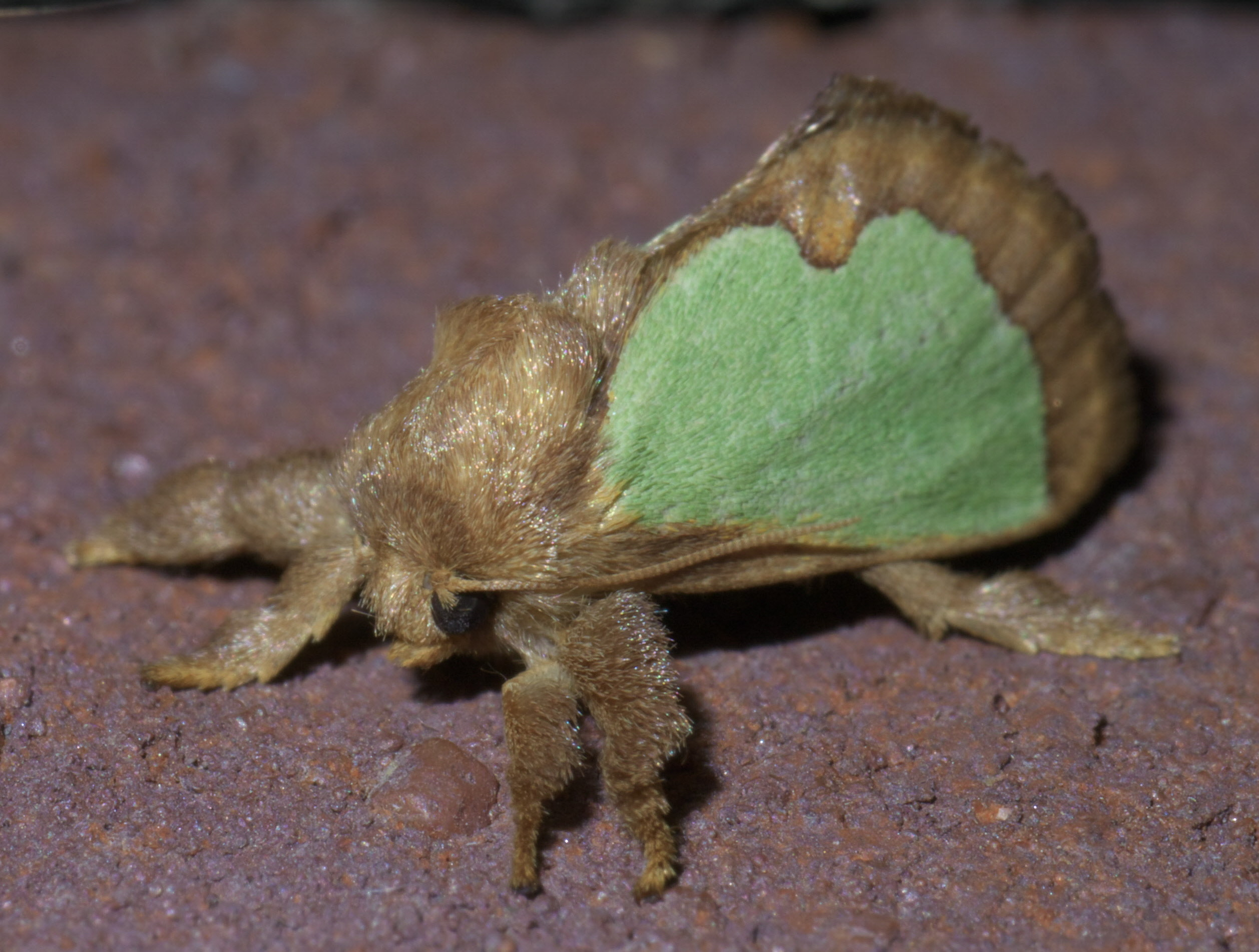
- Euclea incisa

Scientific classification
- Kingdom: Animalia
- Phylum: Arthropoda
- Clade: Pancrustacea
- Class: Insecta
- Order: Lepidoptera
- Family: Limacodidae
- Genus: Euclea; Hübner, 1819

= Euclea (moth) =

Genus of moths

Euclea is a genus of moths in the family Limacodidae (the slug caterpillar moths). The genus was erected by Jacob Hübner in 1819. There are at least 40 described species in Euclea.

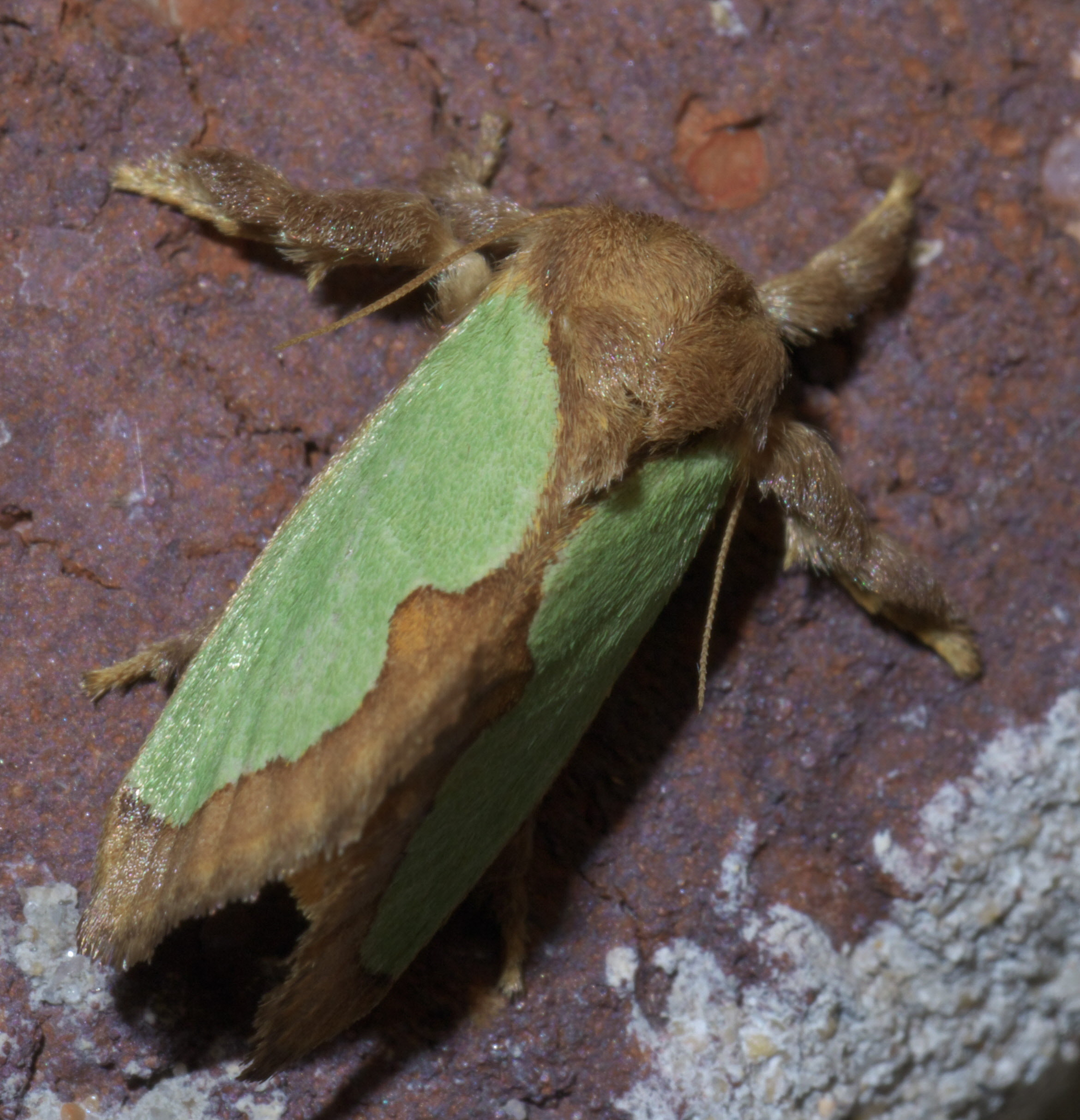
Euclea incisa

== Species ==
These 40 species belong to the genus Euclea:

- Euclea aemilia Stoll, 1782^{c g}
- Euclea aethes Dognin, 1911^{c g}
- Euclea agchiatropha Dognin, 1914^{c g}
- Euclea baranda Schaus, 1900^{c g}
- Euclea bidiscalis Dyar, 1906^{c g}
- Euclea brillantina Rothschild, 1911^{c g}
- Euclea brunnea Holland, 1893^{c g}
- Euclea buscki Dyar, 1912^{c g}
- Euclea byrne Dyar, 1912^{c g}
- Euclea cassida Dyar, 1927^{c g}
- Euclea cipior Dyar, 1906^{c g}
- Euclea cippus Cramer, 1775^{c g}
- Euclea copac Schaus, 1892^{c g}
- Euclea cuspostriga Dyar, 1906^{c g}
- Euclea delphinii (Bdv., 1832)^{i c g b} (spiny oak-slug moth)
- Euclea determinata Druce, 1887^{c g}
- Euclea dicolon Sepp, 1848^{c g}
- Euclea distrahens Dyar, 1912^{c g}
- Euclea diversa Druce, 1887^{c g}
- Euclea divisa Holland, 1893^{c g}
- Euclea dolliana Dyar, 1905^{i c g}
- Euclea dolosa Druce^{c g}
- Euclea flava Barnes & McDunnough, 1910^{i c g b}
- Euclea fuscipars Dyar, 1918^{c g}
- Euclea gajentaani Epstein and Corrales, 2004^{c g}
- Euclea immundaria Dyar, 1906^{c g}
- Euclea incisa Harv., 1876^{i g b}
- Euclea jelyce Dyar, 1926^{c g}
- Euclea lamora Dognin, 1911^{c g}
- Euclea nana Dyar, 1891^{c g}
- Euclea nanina Dyar, 1899^{i c g b} (nanina oak-slug moth)
- Euclea norba Druce, 1887^{c g}
- Euclea pallicolor Dyar, 1906^{c g}
- Euclea permodesta Dyar, 1906^{c g}
- Euclea peroloides Dognin, 1916^{c g}
- Euclea plugma Sepp, 1848^{c g}
- Euclea poasica Dyar, 1912^{c g}
- Euclea rufa Butler, 1878^{c g}
- Euclea signata Köhler, 1924^{c g}
- Euclea spadicis Grossbeck, 1906^{c g}
- Euclea trichathdota Dyar, 1910^{c g}

Data sources: i = ITIS, c = Catalogue of Life, g = GBIF, b = BugGuide
