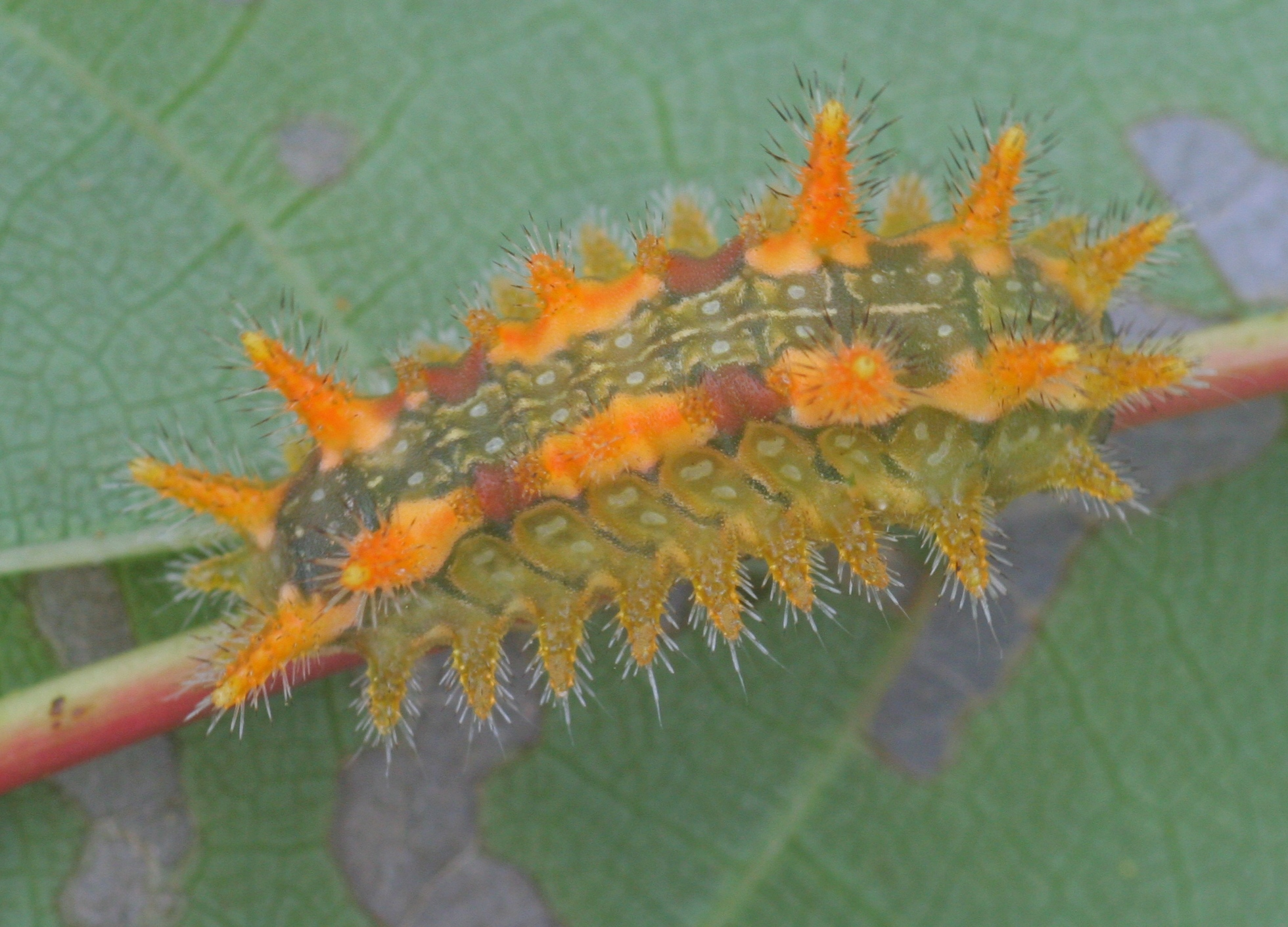

Scientific classification
- Kingdom: Animalia
- Phylum: Arthropoda
- Clade: Pancrustacea
- Class: Insecta
- Order: Lepidoptera
- Family: Limacodidae
- Genus: Euclea
- Species: E. delphinii

Binomial name
- Euclea delphinii (Gray, 1832)

= Spiny oak slug =

Euclea delphinii

Larval form of a species of moth

The spiny oak slug (Euclea delphinii) is the larval form (caterpillar) of a moth in the family Limacodidae.

== Life cycle ==
There is one generation a year in most of the northern parts of its range, with caterpillars seen from late June to October (Wagner 2005). Two generations or more from Missouri south.

=== Egg ===
Eggs are laid singly or in small clusters on leaves (Wagner 2005).

=== Larva ===
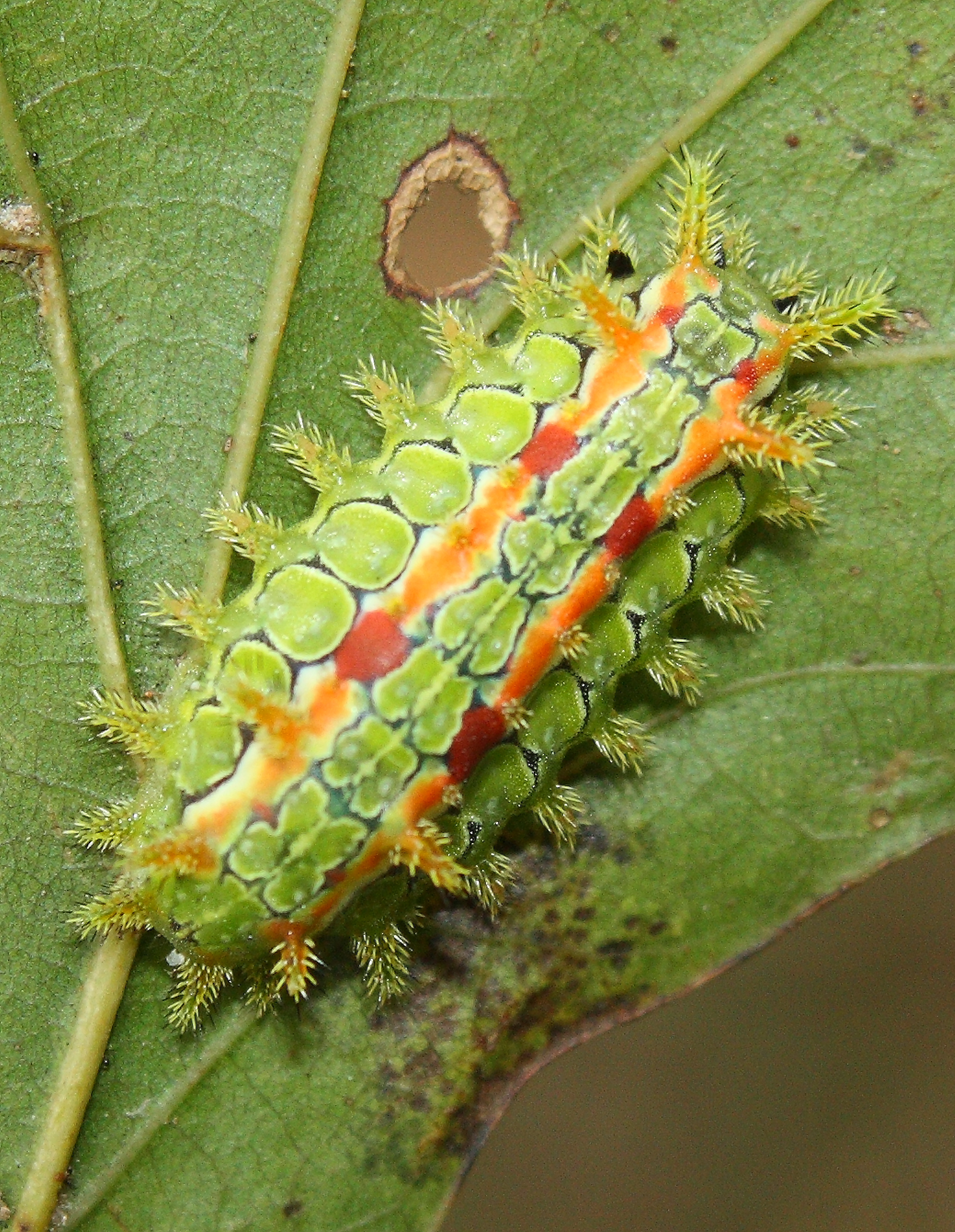
Euclea delphini Larva

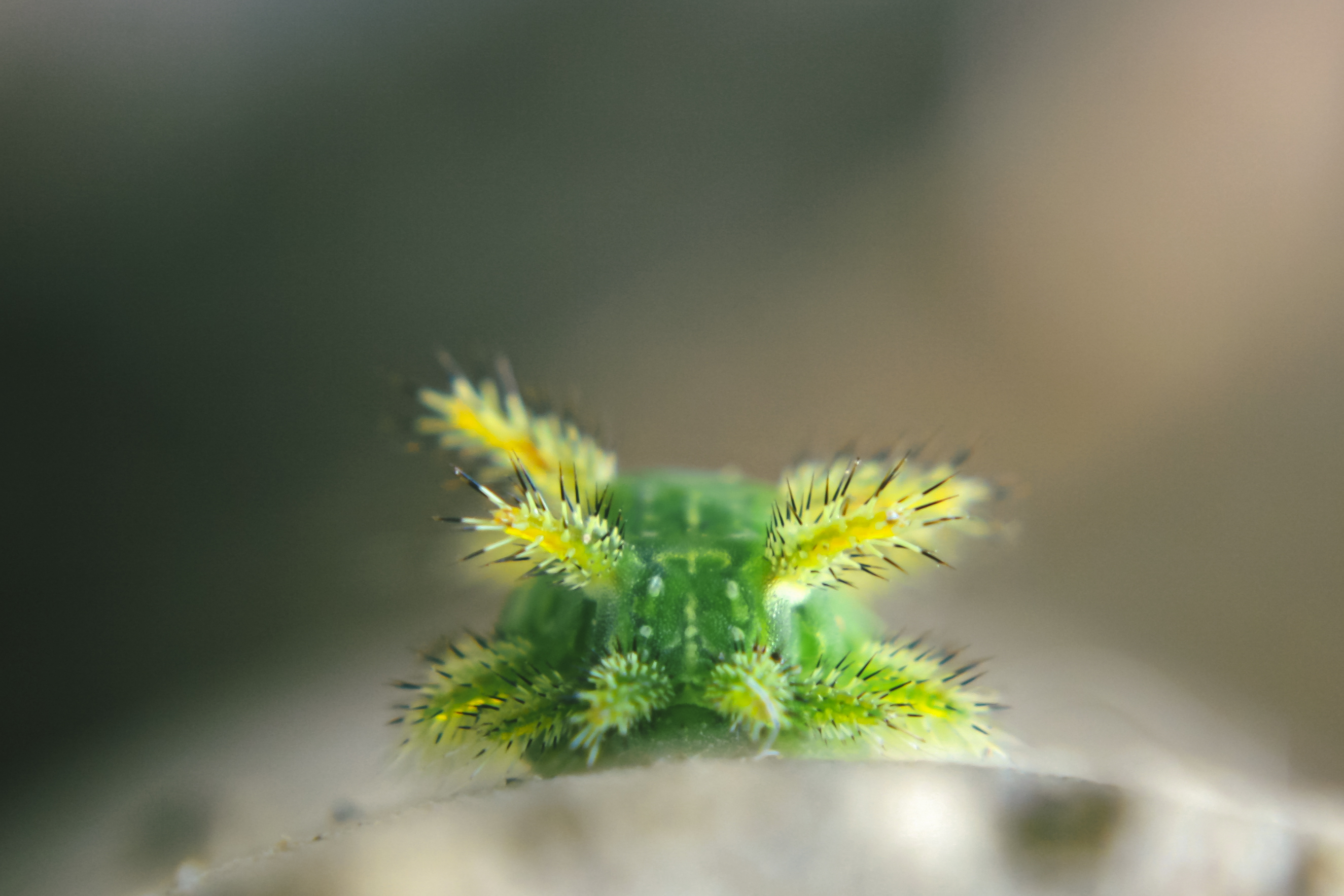
The front of a Spiny Oak Slug (Euclea delphinii)

Euclea delphinii is the only species of its genus to exist in West Virginia (USDA 2022). Euclea caterpillar larvae are variable in colour, with the most common colouration being yellowish green, with bright red, square subdorsal markings- making this a distinct ID feature for this species. Orange hues are also common, alongside the red square subdorsal markings.The larva is flattened and ovoid in outline, with spiny tubercules along the back and sides. These are venomous, producing symptoms in humans that vary from mild itching and burning to more serious reactions that require medical attention (Florida Poison Information Center 2015). The sides have craters ringed with black or white along them. This species has 8 instars in total, with the first instar being a small, whitish larva with subdorsal tubercules. In the final instar they usually have two to four sets of black hairs at the tail end, that can fall off, called 'caltrop' spines after the Roman defensive weapons. Colourful, but the colours vary enormously (Wagner 2005). with orange, green, lichen and orange-green Florida forms also recorded, although less common (USDA 2022). Like all limacodids, the legs are shortened and the prolegs are reduced to suction cups. Maximum length, 20 mm (Wagner 2005).

=== Pupa ===
Pupates in a cup-shaped cocoon with a circular escape hatch.

=== Adult ===
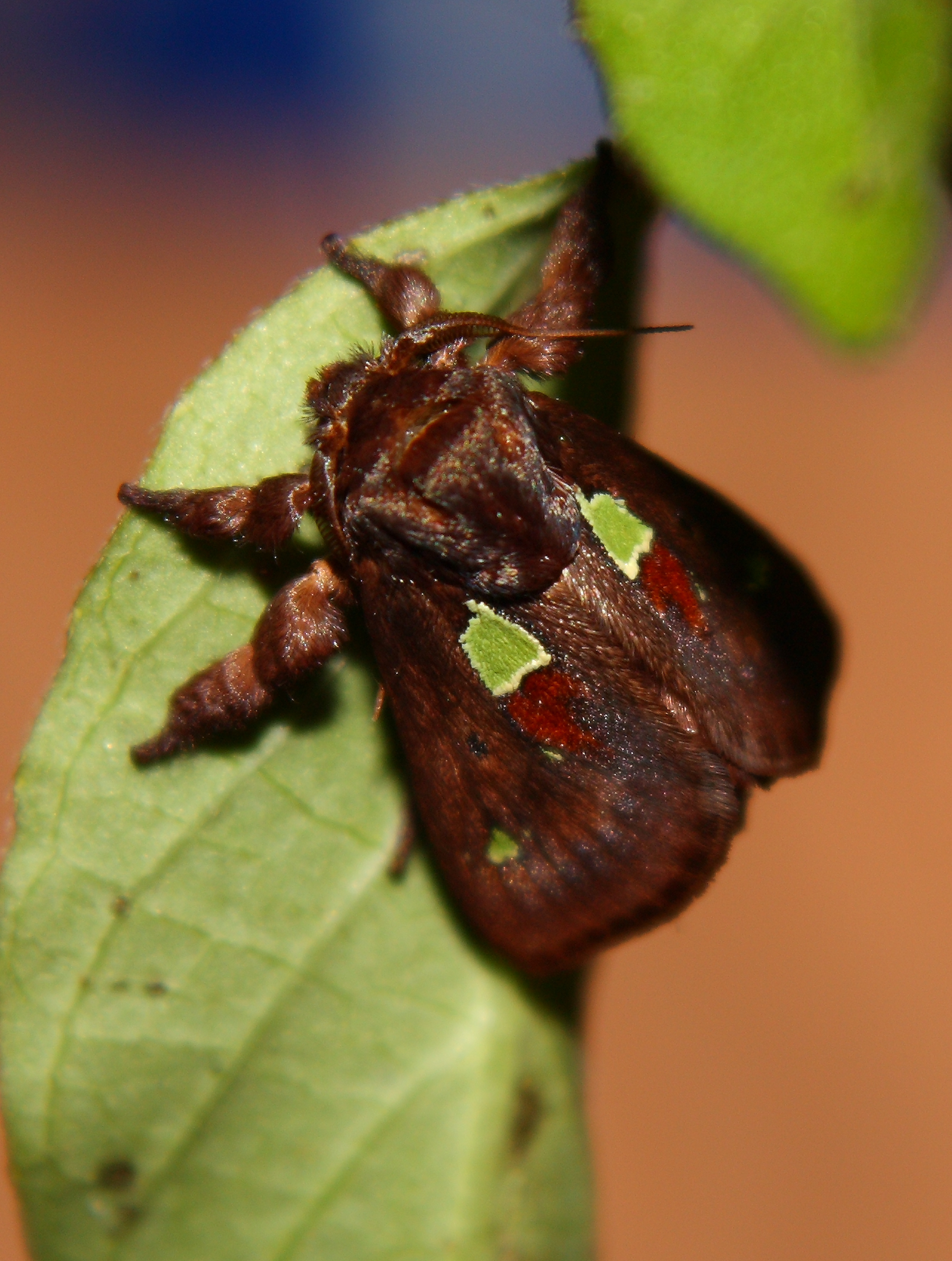
Euclea delphinii Moth

The small (1 cm) moth is 'hairy' and brown, with green patches on the upper wing. The underwing is a paler grey-brown.

=== Parasitoids ===
A number of parasitoids have been recorded on spiny oak slug caterpillars, including tachinid flies (Uramya pristis; Austrophorocera einaris; Compsilura concinnata), eulophid wasps (Platyplectrus americana; Pediobius crassicornis), and braconid wasps (Cotesia empretiae; Triraphis discoideus). An egg parasitoid of genus Trichogramma was also recorded.(Gates et al 2012)

=== Phenology of Caterpillar ===
The caterpillar distribution varies, most notably from June to October. With the adults appearing in April to September. Overall, this species' range is from East Minnesota to Maine and New Brunswick all the way to where it's most commonly found, in West Virginia. Male populations also outnumber female populations drastically (USDA 2022).

There is one generation of caterpillars per year in most of the Eastern U.S., mostly being active from late June to October. 2 generations of caterpillars occur in Missouri and the Deep South, where there are more presumed to be in this area (Wagner 2005).

=== Look Alikes/Species Confusion ===
Euclea delphinii caterpillars are often confused with other caterpillars from their genus, particularly Parasa spp. This confusion is mostly due to the brown and green coloration in the adult moths. Upon closer inspection, however, the two species can be distinguished: Parasa spp. has a larger green patch on its forewings, while Euclea delphinii features smaller green spots and more brown on its forewings. Most of this confusion occurs outside of West Virginia, where many forewings appear predominantly green. To help with accurate identification, focusing on the thorax is key. Euclea delphinii has a brown thorax, setting it apart from the green thorax of Parasa spp. (USDA 2022).

== Food plants ==
Eats a variety of deciduous trees and shrubs, not limited to: apple, ash, basswood, beech, birch, blueberry, cherry, chestnut, hackberry, hickory, maple, oak, poplar, sycamore and willow (Wagner 2005).
