= Dolichomyia =

Scientific classification
- Domain: Eukaryota
- Kingdom: Animalia
- Phylum: Arthropoda
- Class: Insecta
- Order: Diptera
- Family: Bombyliidae
- Subfamily: Toxophorinae
- Tribe: Systropodini
- Genus: Dolichomyia; Wiedemann, 1830

Genus of flies

Dolichomyia is a genus of bee flies in the family Bombyliidae. There are about seven described species in Dolichomyia.

== Species ==
These seven species belong to the genus Dolichomyia:

- Dolichomyia chilensis (Philippi, 1865)^{c g}
- Dolichomyia coniocera Hall, 1976^{c g}
- Dolichomyia detecta Schiner, 1868^{c g}
- Dolichomyia gracilis Williston, 1894^{i c g b}
- Dolichomyia nigra Wiedemann, 1830^{c g}
- Dolichomyia nigria Wiedemann, 1830^{c g}
- Dolichomyia stenopennis Hall, 1976^{c g}

Data sources: i = ITIS, c = Catalogue of Life, g = GBIF, b = Bugguide.net
