= Uramya pristis =

Scientific classification
- Kingdom: Animalia
- Phylum: Arthropoda
- Class: Insecta
- Order: Diptera
- Family: Tachinidae
- Subfamily: Dexiinae
- Tribe: Uramyini
- Genus: Uramya
- Species: U. pristis

Binomial name
- Uramya pristis (Walker, 1849)

Synonyms
- Dexia pristis Walker, 1849; Exorista isae Coquillett, 1897; Macquartia johnsoni Townsend, 1892; Tachina basalis Walker, 1853

Species of fly

Uramya pristis is a species of fly in the family Tachinidae. It is a parasitoid of Limacodidae moths, and overwinters in its pupal stage.

== Distribution ==
Canada, United States, Mexico.
