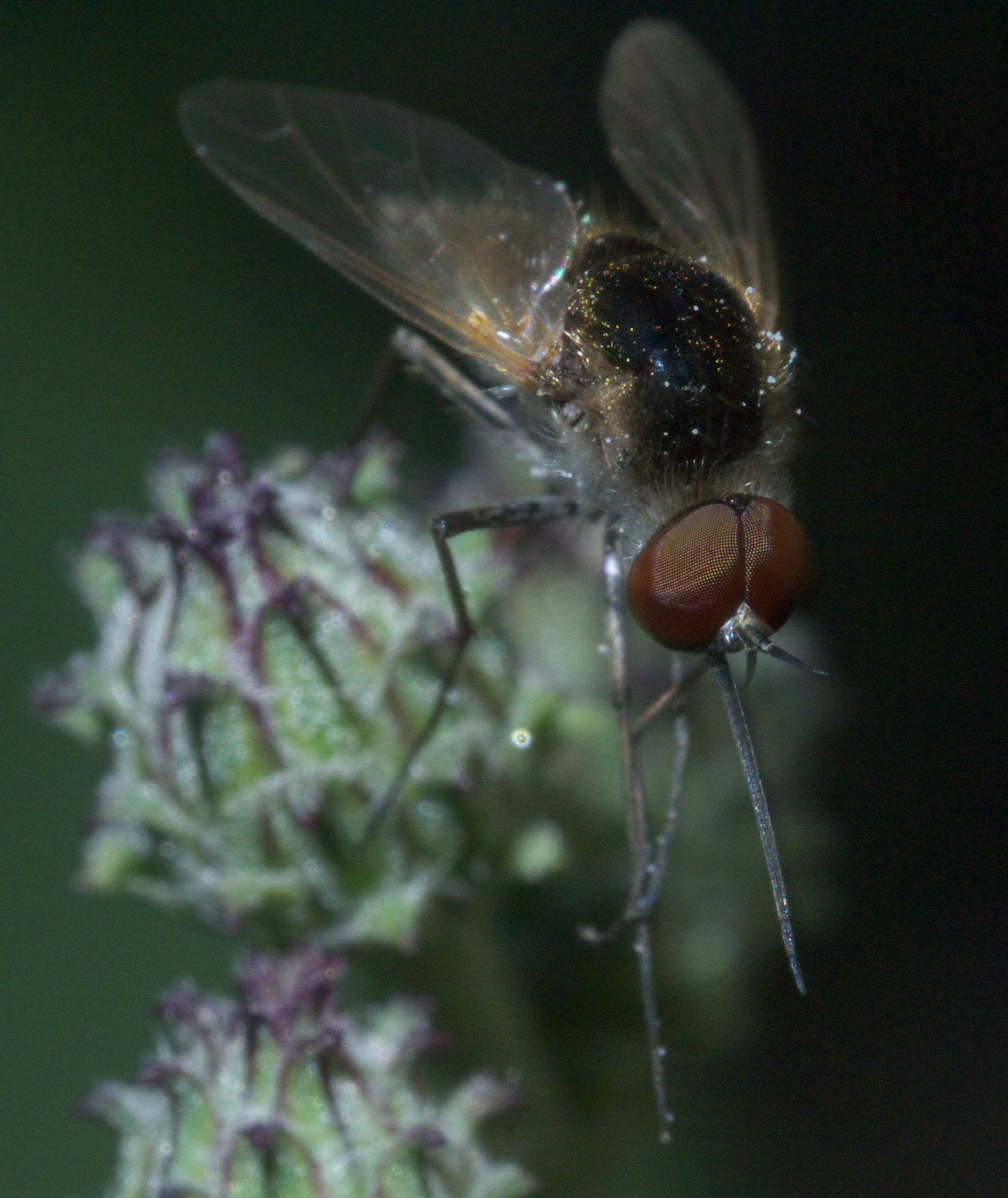

Scientific classification
- Kingdom: Animalia
- Phylum: Arthropoda
- Class: Insecta
- Order: Diptera
- Family: Bombyliidae
- Subfamily: Toxophorinae
- Genus: Geron; Meigen, 1820

Diversity
- ≥180 species

= Geron (fly) =

Genus of flies

Geron is a genus of bee flies in the family Bombyliidae. There are at least 180 described species in the genus Geron, found on every continent except Antarctica.

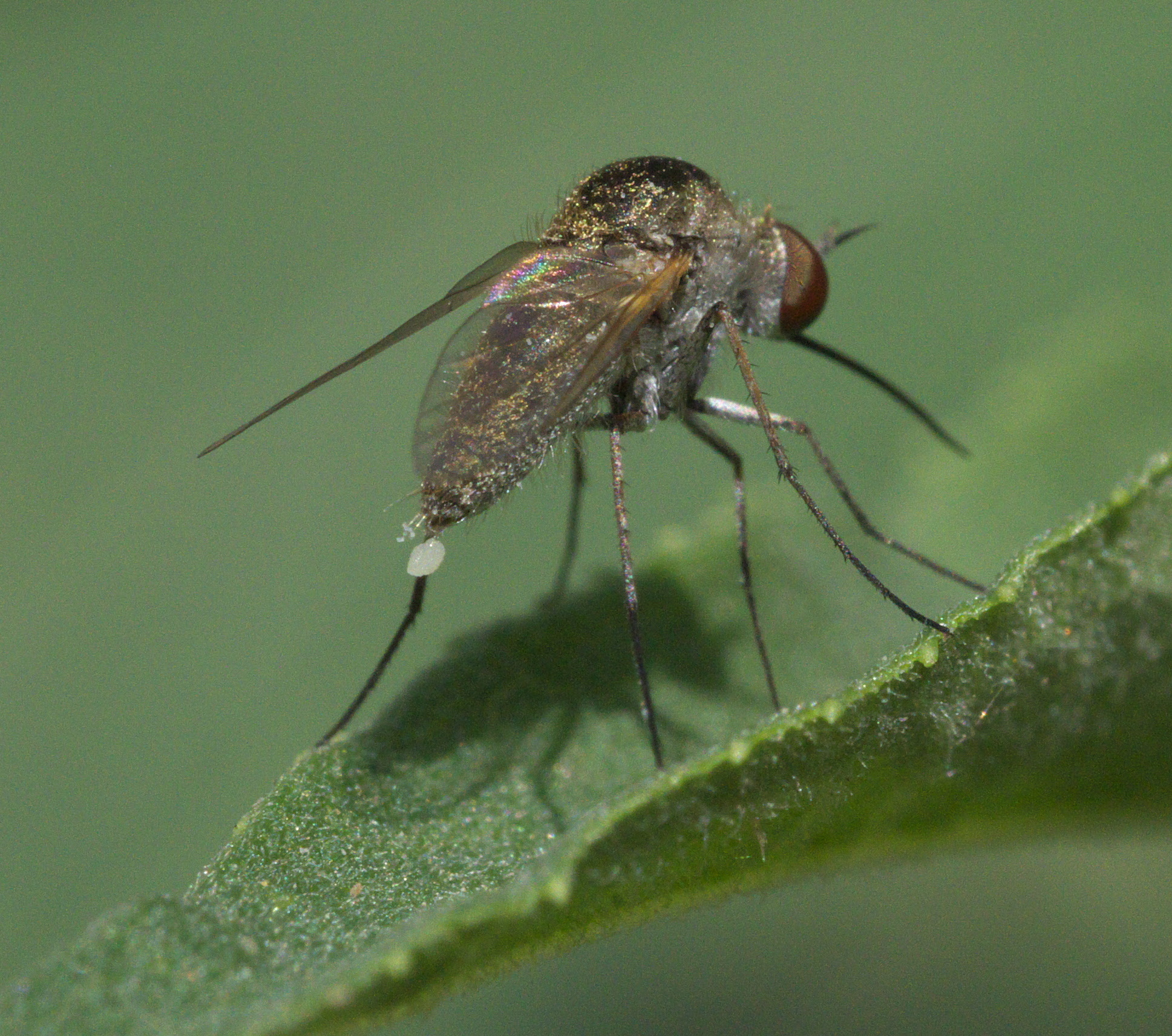

== See also ==
- List of Geron species
