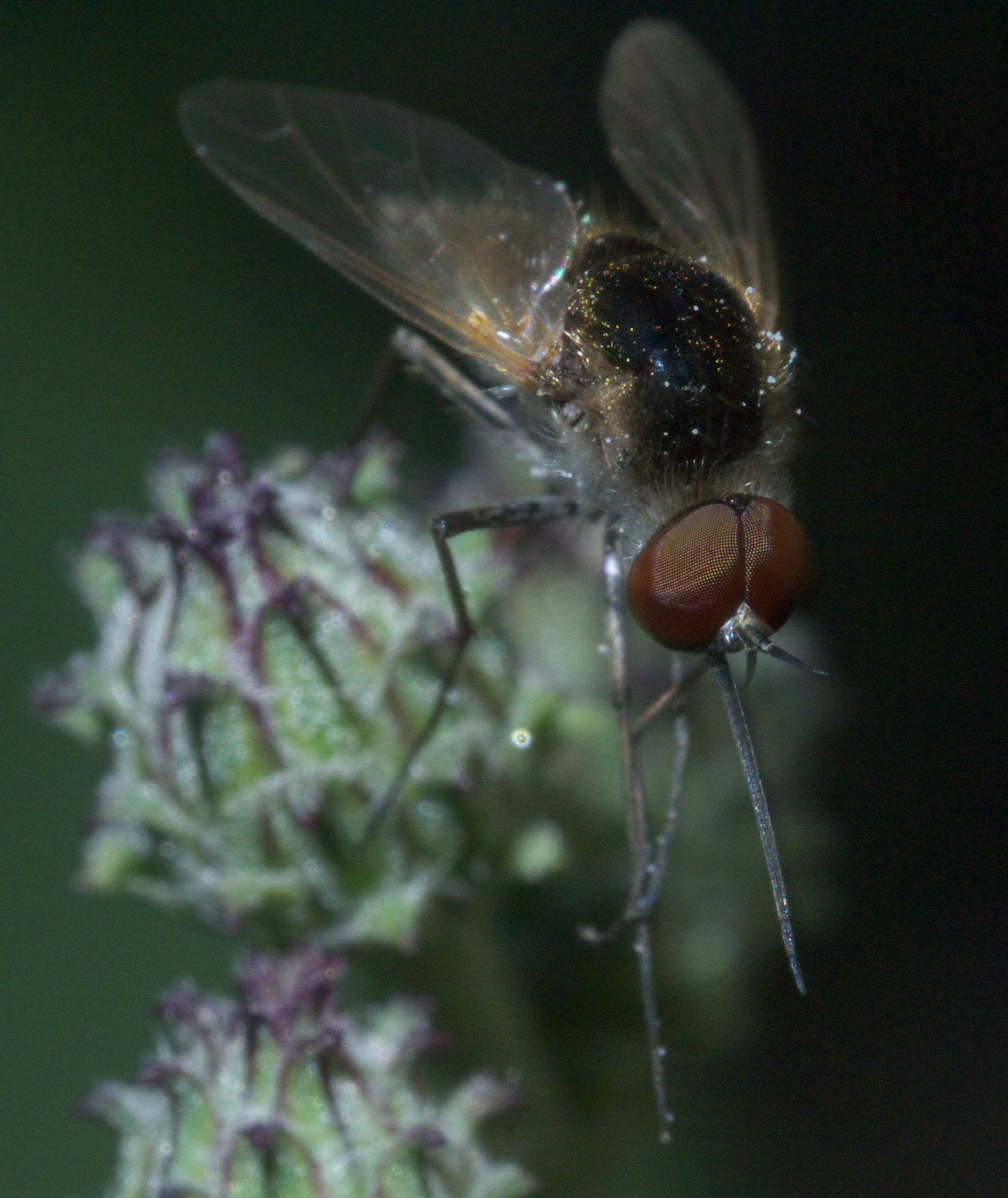
- Geron

Scientific classification
- Kingdom: Animalia
- Phylum: Arthropoda
- Class: Insecta
- Order: Diptera
- Family: Bombyliidae
- Subfamily: Toxophorinae

= Toxophorinae =

Subfamily of flies

Toxophorinae is a subfamily of bee flies in the family Bombyliidae. There are five living genera and two extinct genera containing more than 400 described species in Toxophorinae.

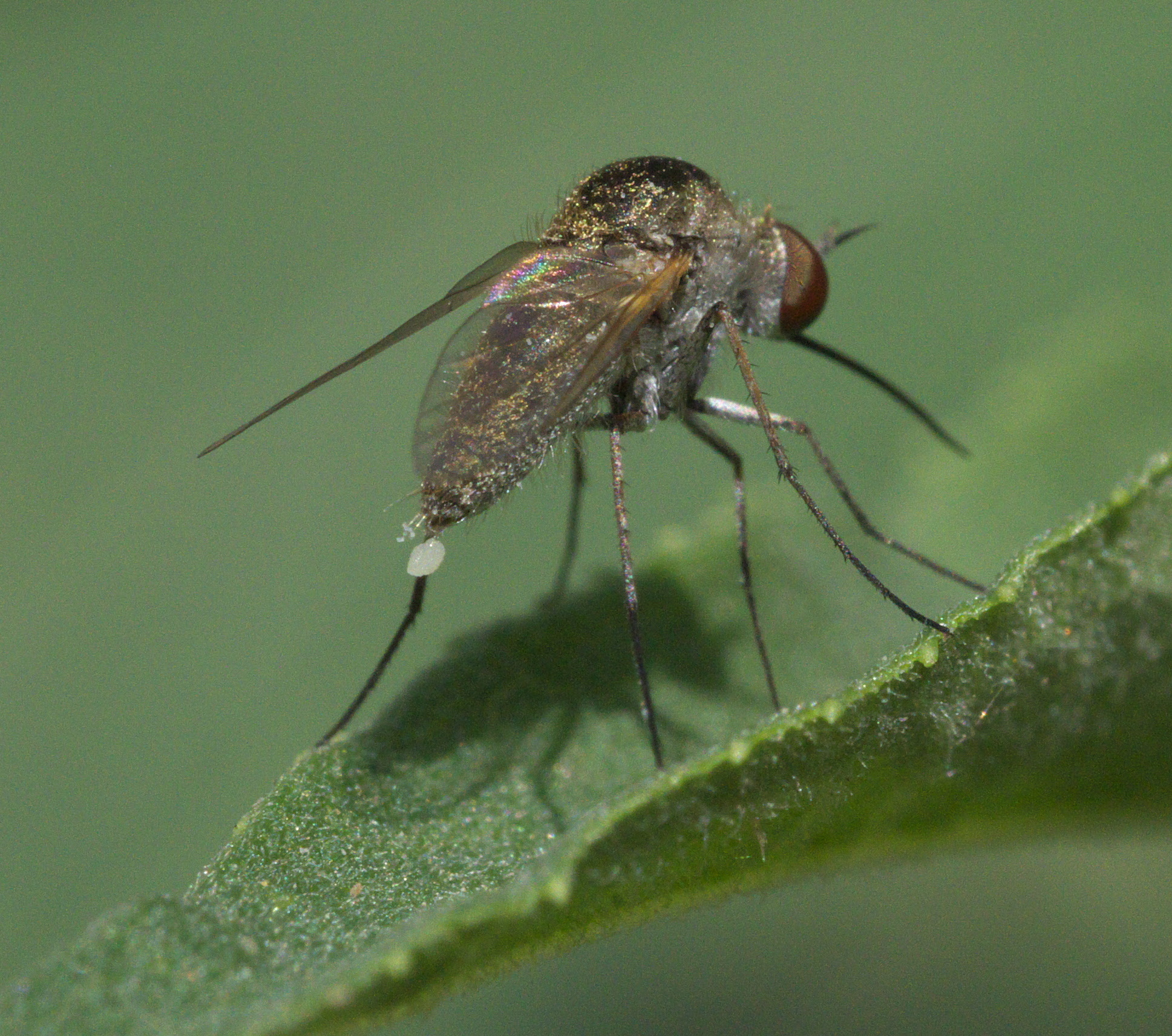
Geron

== Genera ==
These seven genera belong to the subfamily Toxophorinae:

- Dolichomyia Wiedemann, 1830^{i c g b}
- Geron Meigen, 1820^{i c g b}
- Systropus Wiedemann, 1820^{i c g b}
- Toxophora Meigen, 1803^{i g b}
- Zaclava Hull, 1973^{c g}
- † Melanderella Cockerell, 1909^{g}
- † Paradolichomyia Nel & De Ploëg, 2004^{g}

Data sources: i = ITIS, c = Catalogue of Life, g = GBIF, b = Bugguide.net
