= Polygrammodes limitalis =

Scientific classification
- Kingdom: Animalia
- Phylum: Arthropoda
- Class: Insecta
- Order: Lepidoptera
- Family: Crambidae
- Genus: Polygrammodes
- Species: P. limitalis

Binomial name
- Polygrammodes limitalis Hampson, 1899

Species of moth

Polygrammodes limitalis is a moth in the family Crambidae. It is found on Borneo.

The wingspan is about 30 mm. Adults are similar to Polygrammodes purpuralis, but the basal red area of both wings is small and the discal expansion of the costal red fascia on the forewings are small.
