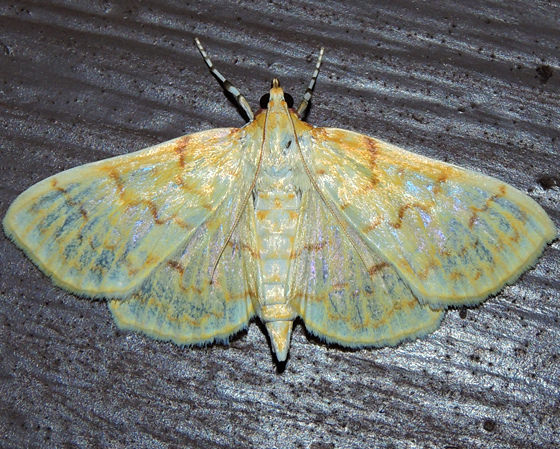
- Polygrammodes flavidalis

Scientific classification
- Kingdom: Animalia
- Phylum: Arthropoda
- Clade: Pancrustacea
- Class: Insecta
- Order: Lepidoptera
- Family: Crambidae
- Tribe: Margaroniini
- Genus: Polygrammodes; Guenée, 1854

Synonyms
- Astura Guenée, 1854; Dichocrocopsis Dyar, 1910; Dichocropsis Munroe, 1983; Hilaopsis Lederer, 1863

= Polygrammodes =

Genus of moths

Polygrammodes is a genus of moths of the family Crambidae.

== Species ==
- Polygrammodes atricosta Hampson, 1913
- Polygrammodes auropurpuralis Dognin, 1903
- Polygrammodes baeuscalis Dyar, 1913
- Polygrammodes biangulalis Dognin, 1903
- Polygrammodes citrinalis Hampson, 1913
- Polygrammodes compositalis (Lederer, 1863)
- Polygrammodes croesus (Druce, 1895)
- Polygrammodes cuneatalis Dognin, 1908
- Polygrammodes cyamon Druce, 1899
- Polygrammodes delicata Munroe, 1960
- Polygrammodes dubialis Schaus, 1924
- Polygrammodes eaclealis Munroe, 1958
- Polygrammodes effusalis Walker, 1866
- Polygrammodes eleuata (Fabricius, 1777)
- Polygrammodes ephremalis Schaus, 1927
- Polygrammodes faraonyalis Viette, 1954
- Polygrammodes farinalis Hampson, 1899
- Polygrammodes fenestrata Munroe, 1958
- Polygrammodes flavescens Hampson, 1918
- Polygrammodes flavidalis (Guenée, 1854)
- Polygrammodes flavivenata Munroe, 1958
- Polygrammodes fluminalis (Butler, 1883)
- Polygrammodes fusinotalis Dognin, 1923
- Polygrammodes griseinotata Munroe, 1958
- Polygrammodes griveaudalis Viette, 1981
- Polygrammodes harlequinalis Munroe, 1958
- Polygrammodes hartigi Munroe, 1958
- Polygrammodes hercules (C. Felder, R. Felder & Rogenhofer, 1875)
- Polygrammodes herminealis Schaus, 1920
- Polygrammodes hintzi Strand, 1911
- Polygrammodes hyalescens Hampson, 1913
- Polygrammodes hyalomaculata Dognin, 1908
- Polygrammodes hyalosticta Hampson, 1899
- Polygrammodes infixalis (Herrich-Schäffer, 1871)
- Polygrammodes interpunctalis Dognin, 1904
- Polygrammodes klagesi Munroe, 1958
- Polygrammodes koepckei Munroe, 1958
- Polygrammodes langdonalis
- Polygrammodes leptorrhapta (Meyrick, 1936)
- Polygrammodes leucalis (Guenée, 1854)
- Polygrammodes lichyi Munroe, 1958
- Polygrammodes limitalis Hampson, 1899
- Polygrammodes maccalis (Lederer, 1863)
- Polygrammodes maculiferalis (Dyar, 1910)
- Polygrammodes mimetica Munroe, 1960
- Polygrammodes modestalis Dyar, 1912
- Polygrammodes moerulalis (Walker, 1859)
- Polygrammodes naranja Munroe, 1959
- Polygrammodes nervosa (Warren, 1889)
- Polygrammodes nigrilinealis Hampson, 1903
- Polygrammodes nonagrialis Hampson, 1899
- Polygrammodes obscuridiscalis Munroe, 1958
- Polygrammodes obsoletalis Munroe, 1958
- Polygrammodes ostrealis (Guenée, 1854)
- Polygrammodes oxydalis (Guenée, 1854)
- Polygrammodes pareaclealis Munroe, 1958
- Polygrammodes phaeocraspis Hampson, 1913
- Polygrammodes phyllophila (Butler, 1878)
- Polygrammodes ponderalis (Guenée, 1854)
- Polygrammodes purpureorufalis Hampson, 1918
- Polygrammodes quatrilis (Druce, 1902)
- Polygrammodes rufinalis
- Polygrammodes runicalis Guenée, 1854
- Polygrammodes sanguifrons Hampson, 1913
- Polygrammodes sanguiguttalis Hampson, 1913
- Polygrammodes sanguinalis Druce, 1895
- Polygrammodes semirufa Hampson, 1913
- Polygrammodes senahuensis (Druce, 1895)
- Polygrammodes seyrigalis Viette, 1953
- Polygrammodes spectabilis Munroe, 1958
- Polygrammodes supproximalis Dognin, 1903
- Polygrammodes supremalis Schaus, 1920
- Polygrammodes tapsusalis (Walker, 1859)
- Polygrammodes tessallalis Gaede, 1917
- Polygrammodes trifolialis Dognin, 1908
- Polygrammodes uniflexalis Dognin, 1903
- Polygrammodes zischkai Munroe, 1960

For former Polygrammodes sabelialis (Guenée, 1854) see Pachynoa sabelialis (Guenée, 1854)
