= Polygrammodes sanguiguttalis =

Scientific classification
- Kingdom: Animalia
- Phylum: Arthropoda
- Class: Insecta
- Order: Lepidoptera
- Family: Crambidae
- Genus: Polygrammodes
- Species: P. sanguiguttalis

Binomial name
- Polygrammodes sanguiguttalis Hampson, 1913

Species of moth

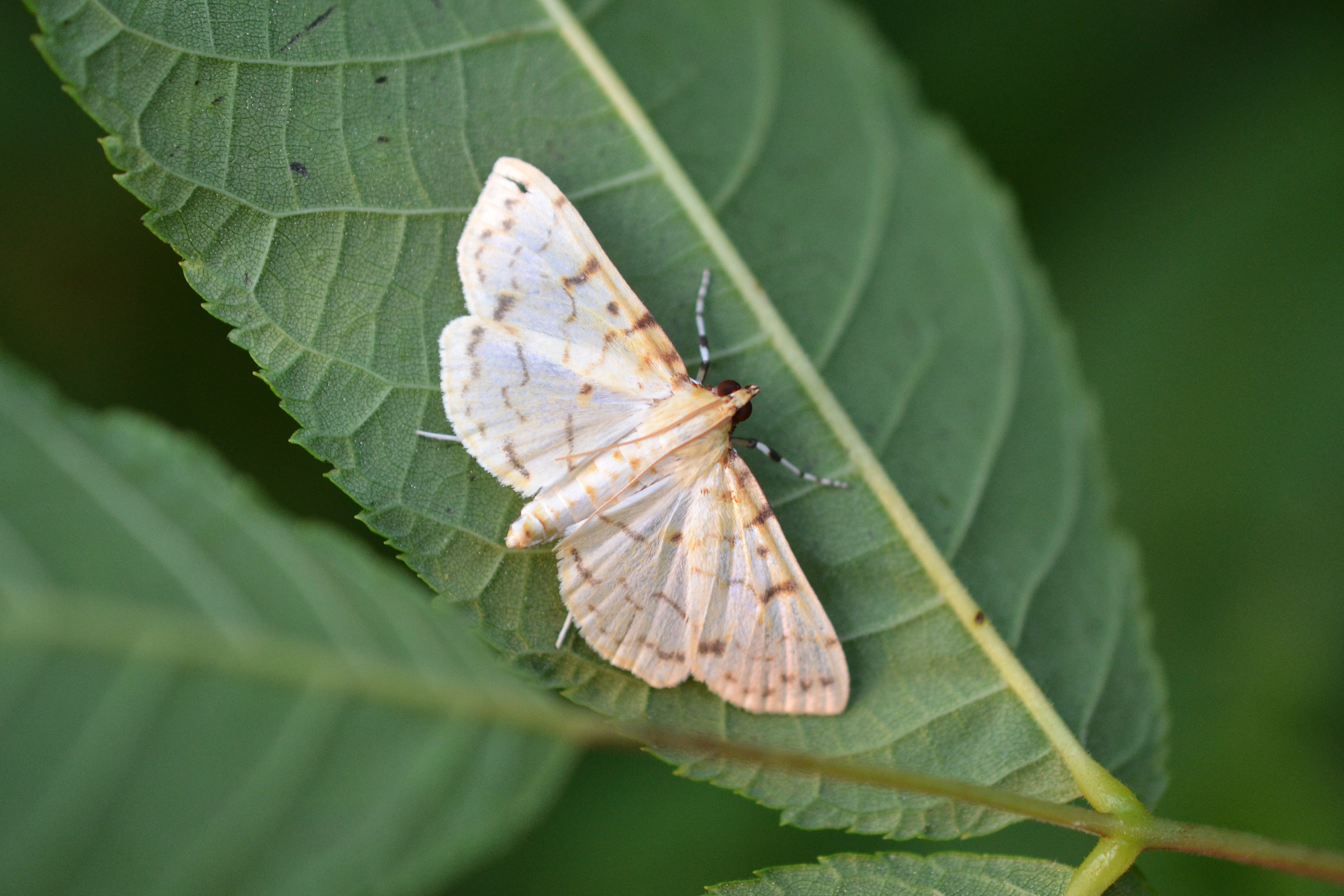
Polygrammodes moth

Polygrammodes sanguiguttalis is a moth in the family Crambidae. It was first described by George Hampson in 1913. It is found in Paraná, Brazil and Paraguay.

The wingspan of the moth is about 42 mm. Its forewings are yellow, with a pink costal area towards beyond the middle. There is a subbasal (situated near or below a base or basal part) pink spot below the cell and an antemedial spot in the cell and another further from the base below the cell, as well as a round spot in the cell towards the extremity and two small discoidal spots. The inner margin is pink from the middle to the tornus and there is a postmedial series of pink spots, as well as a subterminal series of small spots. Its hindwings are pale yellow.

Not to be confused with Polygrammodes flavidalis.
