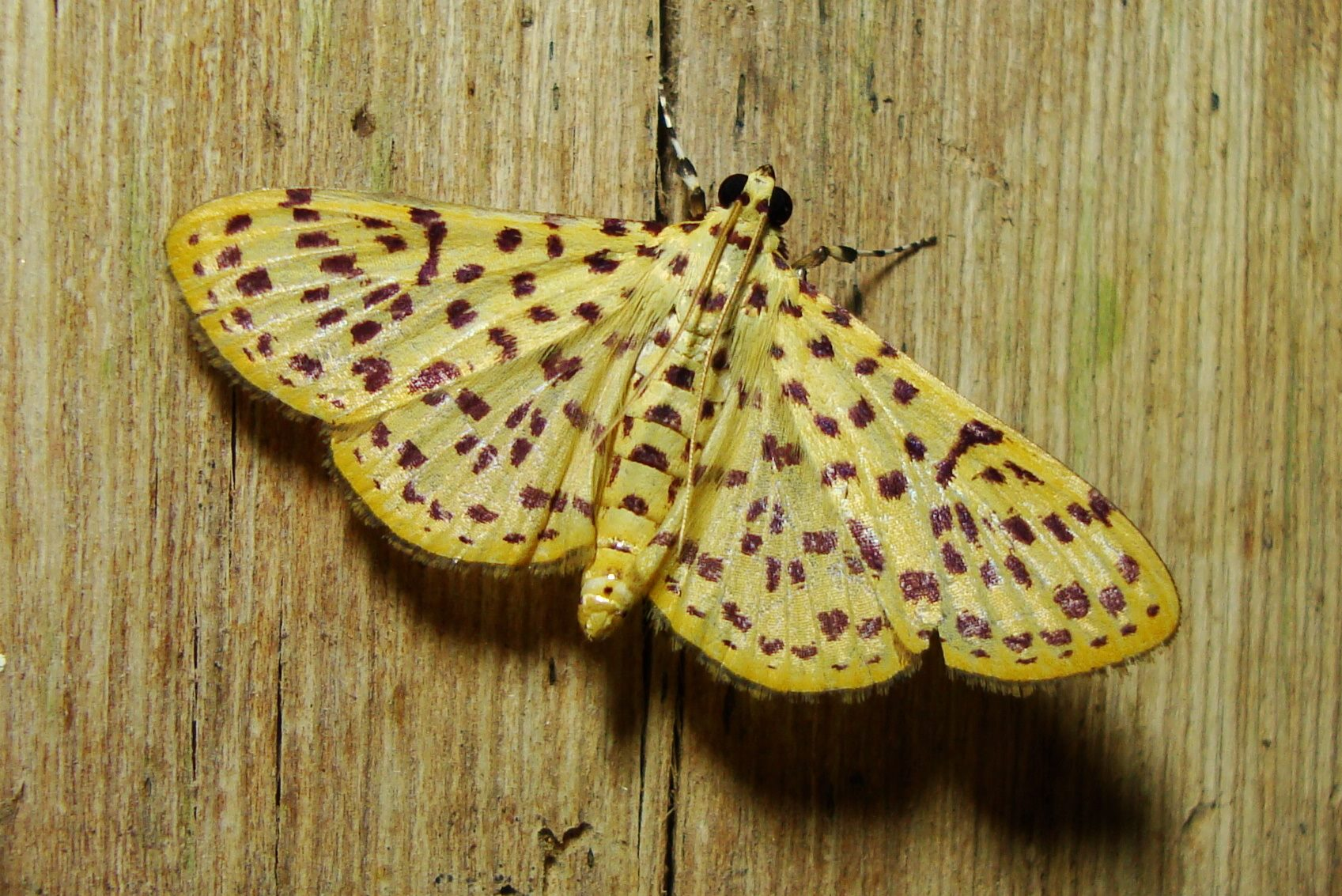

Scientific classification
- Kingdom: Animalia
- Phylum: Arthropoda
- Class: Insecta
- Order: Lepidoptera
- Family: Crambidae
- Genus: Polygrammodes
- Species: P. eleuata

Binomial name
- Polygrammodes eleuata (Fabricius, 1777)

Synonyms
- Phalaena eleuata Fabricius, 1777; Polygrammodes elevata; Astura elevalis Guenée, 1854; Astura elevata Munroe, 1995; Astura elevata var. grandimacula Dognin, 1912

= Polygrammodes eleuata =

Species of moth

Polygrammodes eleuata, the red-spotted sweetpotato moth or many-spotted moth, is a moth in the family Crambidae. It was described by Johan Christian Fabricius in 1777. It is found in Central and South America (including French Guiana), on the Antilles and in the southern United States, where it has been recorded from Florida.

The wingspan is 22–24 mm.

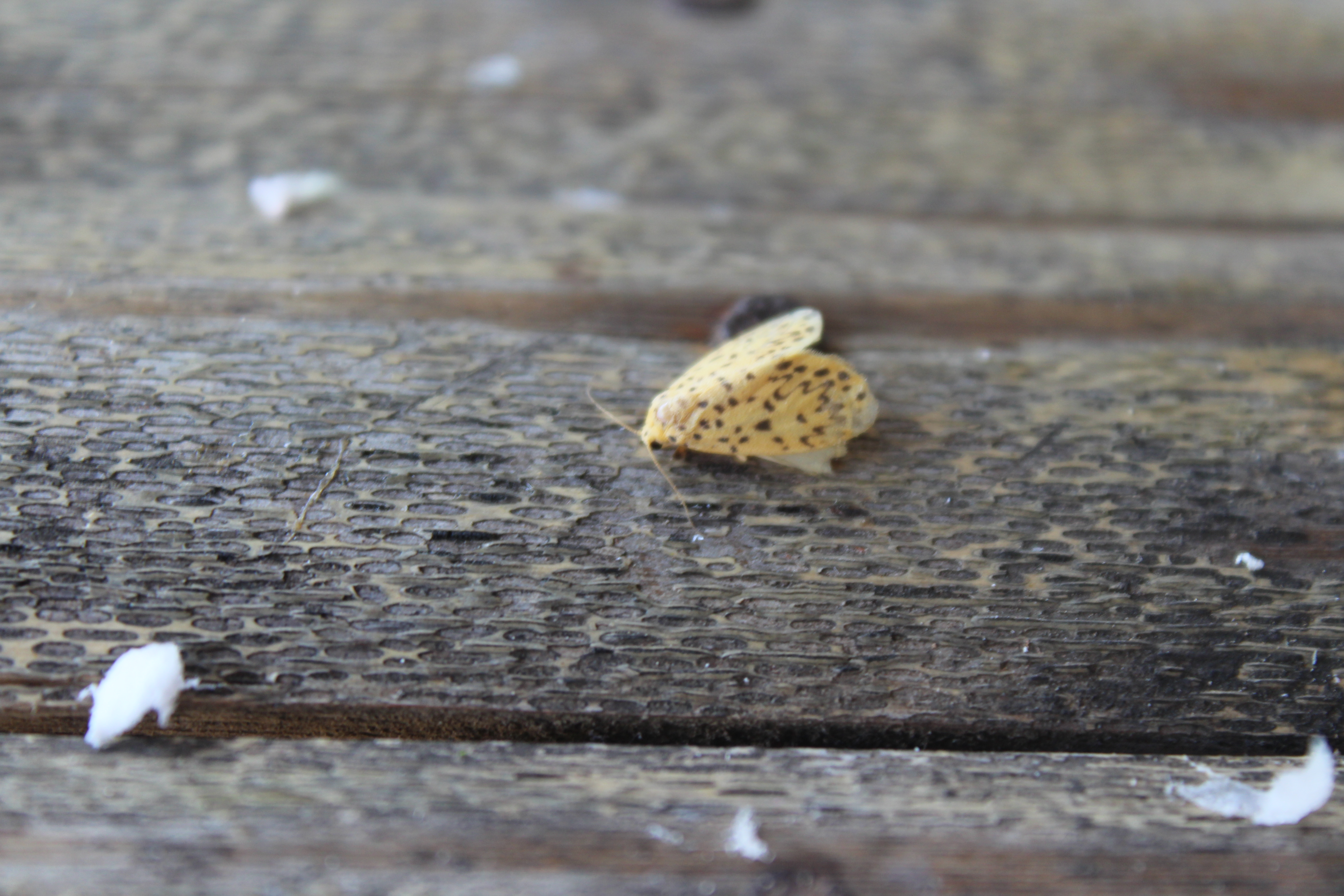
Polygrammodes elevata (Philippines)
