= Polygrammodes flavivenata =

Scientific classification
- Kingdom: Animalia
- Phylum: Arthropoda
- Class: Insecta
- Order: Lepidoptera
- Family: Crambidae
- Genus: Polygrammodes
- Species: P. flavivenata

Binomial name
- Polygrammodes flavivenata Munroe, 1958

Species of moth

Polygrammodes flavivenata is a moth in the family Crambidae. It was described by Eugene G. Munroe in 1958. It is found in Bolivia.
