= Pachynoa interrupta =

Scientific classification
- Kingdom: Animalia
- Phylum: Arthropoda
- Class: Insecta
- Order: Lepidoptera
- Family: Crambidae
- Genus: Pachynoa
- Species: P. interrupta

Binomial name
- Pachynoa interrupta Whalley, 1962

Species of moth

Pachynoa interrupta is a moth in the family Crambidae. It was described by Whalley in 1962. It is found on the Solomon Islands.
