= Pachynoa umbrigera =

Scientific classification
- Kingdom: Animalia
- Phylum: Arthropoda
- Class: Insecta
- Order: Lepidoptera
- Family: Crambidae
- Genus: Pachynoa
- Species: P. umbrigera

Binomial name
- Pachynoa umbrigera Meyrick, 1938

Species of moth

Pachynoa umbrigera is a moth in the family Crambidae. It was described by Edward Meyrick in 1938. It is found on Java in Indonesia.
