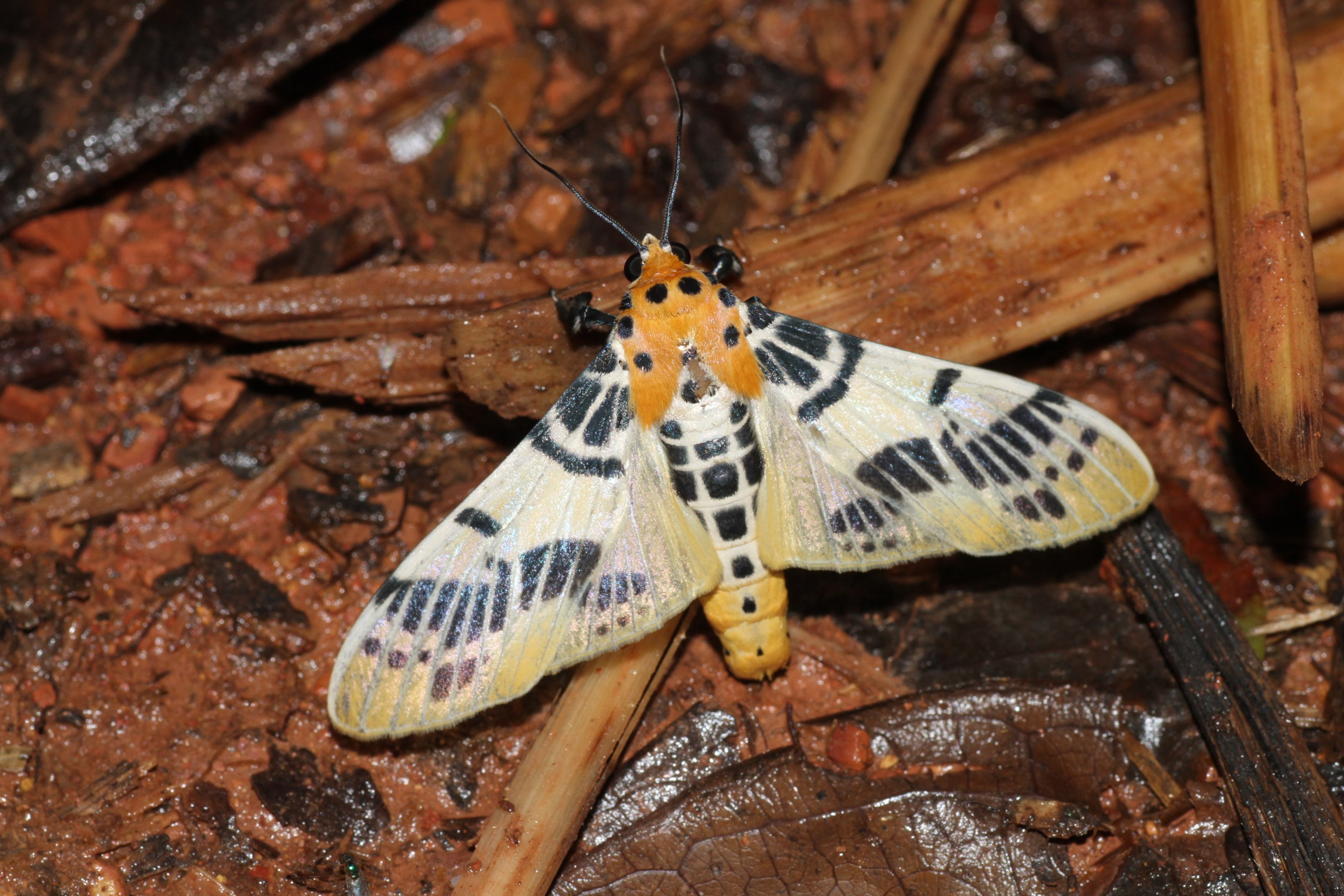

Scientific classification
- Kingdom: Animalia
- Phylum: Arthropoda
- Clade: Pancrustacea
- Class: Insecta
- Order: Lepidoptera
- Family: Crambidae
- Genus: Pachynoa
- Species: P. spilosomoides

Binomial name
- Pachynoa spilosomoides (Moore, 1886)

Synonyms
- Pitacanda spilosomoides Moore, 1886

= Pachynoa spilosomoides =

Species of moth

Pachynoa spilosomoides is a moth in the family Crambidae. It was originally described as Pitacanda spilosomoides by Frederic Moore in 1886 from Sri Lanka Soon after, additional specimens were listed for several Indian localities, including North-eastern states. Later, other sources indicate a much wider distribution such as the Philippines.
