= Polygrammodes tessallalis =

Scientific classification
- Kingdom: Animalia
- Phylum: Arthropoda
- Class: Insecta
- Order: Lepidoptera
- Family: Crambidae
- Genus: Polygrammodes
- Species: P. tessallalis

Binomial name
- Polygrammodes tessallalis Gaede, 1917

Species of moth

Polygrammodes tessallalis is a moth in the family Crambidae. It was described by Max Gaede in 1917. It is found in Cameroon.
