= Polygrammodes leptorrhapta =

Scientific classification
- Kingdom: Animalia
- Phylum: Arthropoda
- Class: Insecta
- Order: Lepidoptera
- Family: Crambidae
- Genus: Polygrammodes
- Species: P. leptorrhapta

Binomial name
- Polygrammodes leptorrhapta (Meyrick, 1936)

Synonyms
- Oeobia leptorrhapta Meyrick, 1936

Species of moth

Polygrammodes leptorrhapta is a moth in the family Crambidae. It was described by Edward Meyrick in 1936. It is found in the Democratic Republic of the Congo provinces of Kongo Central, Katanga, Kasai-Occidental and Kinshasa.

The larvae feed on Stereospermum kunthianum.
