= Pachynoa fruhstorferi =

Scientific classification
- Kingdom: Animalia
- Phylum: Arthropoda
- Class: Insecta
- Order: Lepidoptera
- Family: Crambidae
- Genus: Pachynoa
- Species: P. fruhstorferi

Binomial name
- Pachynoa fruhstorferi E. Hering, 1903

Species of moth

Pachynoa fruhstorferi is a moth in the family Crambidae. It was described by Hering in 1903. It is found in Indonesia (Sulawesi).
