= Polygrammodes phyllophila =

Scientific classification
- Kingdom: Animalia
- Phylum: Arthropoda
- Class: Insecta
- Order: Lepidoptera
- Family: Crambidae
- Genus: Polygrammodes
- Species: P. phyllophila

Binomial name
- Polygrammodes phyllophila (Butler, 1878)

Synonyms
- Botys phyllophila Butler, 1878; Botys distinctalis Saalmüller, 1880; Pyrausta semilimbalis Mabille, 1900

Species of moth

Polygrammodes phyllophila is a moth in the family Crambidae. It was described by Arthur Gardiner Butler in 1878. It is found in Madagascar, South Africa, Uganda and Zambia.
