= Polygrammodes nigrilinealis =

Scientific classification
- Kingdom: Animalia
- Phylum: Arthropoda
- Class: Insecta
- Order: Lepidoptera
- Family: Crambidae
- Genus: Polygrammodes
- Species: P. nigrilinealis

Binomial name
- Polygrammodes nigrilinealis Hampson, 1903

Species of moth

Polygrammodes nigrilinealis is a moth in the family Crambidae. It was described by George Hampson in 1903. It is found in Sikkim, India.
