= Polygrammodes uniflexalis =

Scientific classification
- Kingdom: Animalia
- Phylum: Arthropoda
- Class: Insecta
- Order: Lepidoptera
- Family: Crambidae
- Genus: Polygrammodes
- Species: P. uniflexalis

Binomial name
- Polygrammodes uniflexalis Dognin, 1903

Species of moth

Polygrammodes uniflexalis is a moth in the family Crambidae. It was described by Paul Dognin in 1903. It is found in Ecuador.
