= Polygrammodes fusinotalis =

Scientific classification
- Kingdom: Animalia
- Phylum: Arthropoda
- Class: Insecta
- Order: Lepidoptera
- Family: Crambidae
- Genus: Polygrammodes
- Species: P. fusinotalis

Binomial name
- Polygrammodes fusinotalis Dognin, 1923

Species of moth

Polygrammodes fusinotalis is a moth in the family Crambidae. It was described by Paul Dognin in 1923. It is found in Loja Province, Ecuador.
