= Polygrammodes effusalis =

Scientific classification
- Kingdom: Animalia
- Phylum: Arthropoda
- Class: Insecta
- Order: Lepidoptera
- Family: Crambidae
- Genus: Polygrammodes
- Species: P. effusalis

Binomial name
- Polygrammodes effusalis Walker, 1866

Species of moth

Polygrammodes effusalis is a moth in the family Crambidae. It was described by Francis Walker in 1866. It is found on Java in Indonesia.
