= Polygrammodes nonagrialis =

Scientific classification
- Kingdom: Animalia
- Phylum: Arthropoda
- Class: Insecta
- Order: Lepidoptera
- Family: Crambidae
- Genus: Polygrammodes
- Species: P. nonagrialis

Binomial name
- Polygrammodes nonagrialis Hampson, 1899

Species of moth

Polygrammodes nonagrialis is a moth in the family Crambidae. It is found in Peru.

The wingspan is about 40 mm. Adults are pale ochreous grey-brown, the forewings with a fuscous discoidal lunule. There are traces of a curved postmedial series of fuscous points in the interspaces and of fuscous subterminal streaks towards the apex. The hindwings are whitish, tinged with brownish towards the termen.
