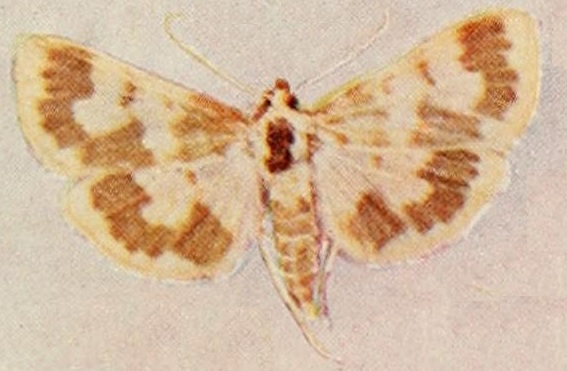

Scientific classification
- Kingdom: Animalia
- Phylum: Arthropoda
- Class: Insecta
- Order: Lepidoptera
- Family: Crambidae
- Genus: Polygrammodes
- Species: P. langdonalis

Binomial name
- Polygrammodes langdonalis (Grote, 1877)

Synonyms
- Botis langdonalis Grote, 1877; Pyrausta langdonalis

= Polygrammodes langdonalis =

Species of moth

Polygrammodes langdonalis is a moth in the family Crambidae. It is found in North America, where it has been recorded from Indiana, Kentucky, Ohio and Texas.

The wingspan is about 28 mm. Adults are on wing from June to August.

The larvae feed on Vernonia species.
