= Polygrammodes interpunctalis =

Scientific classification
- Kingdom: Animalia
- Phylum: Arthropoda
- Class: Insecta
- Order: Lepidoptera
- Family: Crambidae
- Genus: Polygrammodes
- Species: P. interpunctalis

Binomial name
- Polygrammodes interpunctalis Dognin, 1904

Species of moth

Polygrammodes interpunctalis is a moth in the family Crambidae. It was described by Paul Dognin in 1904. It is found in Peru.
