= Polygrammodes atricosta =

Scientific classification
- Kingdom: Animalia
- Phylum: Arthropoda
- Class: Insecta
- Order: Lepidoptera
- Family: Crambidae
- Genus: Polygrammodes
- Species: P. atricosta

Binomial name
- Polygrammodes atricosta Hampson, 1913

Species of moth

Polygrammodes atricosta is a moth in the family Crambidae. It was described by George Hampson in 1913. It is found on Ambon Island in Indonesia.

The wingspan is about 28 mm. The forewings are pale yellow, but the costa is black to beyond the middle and there is some blackish suffusion below it. There are traces of a brownish antemedial line and there is a black discoidal bar, as well as an indistinct fulvous postmedial line with a black point below costa. There is also an indistinct, waved, fulvous subterminal line. The hindwings are pale yellow with a black discoidal point, an indistinct fulvous postmedial line and a faint, minutely waved, fulvous subterminal line from the costa to vein 2.
