= Polygrammodes maccalis =

Scientific classification
- Kingdom: Animalia
- Phylum: Arthropoda
- Class: Insecta
- Order: Lepidoptera
- Family: Crambidae
- Genus: Polygrammodes
- Species: P. maccalis

Binomial name
- Polygrammodes maccalis (Lederer, 1863)

Synonyms
- Botys maccalis Lederer, 1863; Polygrammodes eximia E. D. Jones, 1921

Species of moth

Polygrammodes maccalis is a moth in the family Crambidae. It was described by Julius Lederer in 1863. It is found in Bangladesh and São Paulo, Brazil.

The wingspan is about 37 mm. The wings are white, the forewings with a large basal chocolate spot, as well as three subbasal spots on the costa, in the cell and on the inner margin. There is an antemedial chocolate band, followed by spot in the cell. There is also a medial series of three bars, a postmedial bar from the costa to vein 5 and a series of elongated spots between the veins, as well as a subterminal series of elongated spots from below vein 8 to the inner margin, confluent with a postmedial series between veins 1 and 2 and between 3 and 5. A terminal orange band expands below vein 2 with an orange shade beyond the lower angle of the cell. The hindwings contain a medial series of four chocolate spots, a postmedial series of spots above veins 2 to 5 and a subterminal series of elongated spots, as well as a terminal orange band and a slight orange shade beyond the lower angle of the cell.
