= Polygrammodes rufinalis =

Scientific classification
- Kingdom: Animalia
- Phylum: Arthropoda
- Class: Insecta
- Order: Lepidoptera
- Family: Crambidae
- Genus: Polygrammodes
- Species: P. rufinalis

Binomial name
- Polygrammodes rufinalis Hampson, 1899

Species of moth

Polygrammodes rufinalis is a moth in the family Crambidae. It is found in Venezuela.

The wingspan is about 46 mm. Adults are brown with a pinkish tinge, the forewings with an indistinct dark antemedial line and a quadrate hyaline spot in the end of the cell and a wedge shaped spot beyond it. There is a dentate postmedial line with a brick-red area between it and the subterminal line. The hindwings have a quadrate hyaline spot in the cell and a wedge shaped spot beyond it. The area from the middle to the terminal band is brick-red.
