= Polygrammodes croesus =

Scientific classification
- Kingdom: Animalia
- Phylum: Arthropoda
- Class: Insecta
- Order: Lepidoptera
- Family: Crambidae
- Genus: Polygrammodes
- Species: P. croesus

Binomial name
- Polygrammodes croesus (H. Druce, 1895)

Synonyms
- Pachynoa croesus H. Druce, 1895

Species of moth

Polygrammodes croesus is a moth in the family Crambidae. It was described by Herbert Druce in 1895. It is found in Guatemala.

The forewings and hindwings are chrome yellow, shaded with blackish-grey scales at the base and across the middle, crossed from the costal to the inner margin by two curved dark grey lines. There is a rather faint submarginal zigzag line extending from the costal margin near the apex to the inner margin of the forewings and there is a small round spot at the base of the cell. There is an elongate hyaline-white spot at the end. The hindwings have a hyaline-white spot at the end of the cell.
