= Polygrammodes hercules =

Scientific classification
- Kingdom: Animalia
- Phylum: Arthropoda
- Class: Insecta
- Order: Lepidoptera
- Family: Crambidae
- Genus: Polygrammodes
- Species: P. hercules

Binomial name
- Polygrammodes hercules (C. Felder, R. Felder & Rogenhofer, 1875)

Synonyms
- Botys hercules C. Felder, R. Felder & Rogenhofer, 1875

Species of moth

Polygrammodes hercules is a moth in the family Crambidae. It was described by Cajetan Felder, Rudolf Felder and Alois Friedrich Rogenhofer in 1875. It is found in Colombia and Costa Rica.
