= Polygrammodes dubialis =

Scientific classification
- Kingdom: Animalia
- Phylum: Arthropoda
- Class: Insecta
- Order: Lepidoptera
- Family: Crambidae
- Genus: Polygrammodes
- Species: P. dubialis

Binomial name
- Polygrammodes dubialis Schaus, 1924

Species of moth

Polygrammodes dubialis is a moth in the family Crambidae. It was described by Schaus in 1924. It is found in Brazil.

The wingspan is about 43 mm. The forewings are white with hazel veins and markings. The basal third, except a white line on the inner margin, is suffused with hazel. There is a white point at the middle of the cell, and a transverse white spot beyond it, crossed by a hazel crescent on its outer edge. There are traces of an antemedial line with a projecting line below the cell. The discocellular line is heavy, with a thick line below it from the base of vein 2 to the submedian, and a short line below submedian. The postmedial line is somewhat lunular, as well as subterminal crosslines on the interspaces. There is a fine terminal line, between veins 5 and 2 the interspaces are faintly tinged with yellow. The hindwings are white, the veins beyond the cell hazel, there is an antemedial wavy line. The postmedial line is finer and more irregular.
