= Polygrammodes griveaudalis =

Scientific classification
- Kingdom: Animalia
- Phylum: Arthropoda
- Class: Insecta
- Order: Lepidoptera
- Family: Crambidae
- Genus: Polygrammodes
- Species: P. griveaudalis

Binomial name
- Polygrammodes griveaudalis Viette, 1981

Species of moth

Polygrammodes griveaudalis is a moth in the family Crambidae. It was described by Viette in 1981. It is found in Madagascar.
