= Polygrammodes baeuscalis =

Scientific classification
- Kingdom: Animalia
- Phylum: Arthropoda
- Class: Insecta
- Order: Lepidoptera
- Family: Crambidae
- Genus: Polygrammodes
- Species: P. baeuscalis

Binomial name
- Polygrammodes baeuscalis Dyar, 1913

Species of moth

Polygrammodes baeuscalis is a moth in the family Crambidae. It was described by Harrison Gray Dyar Jr. in 1913. It is found in Mexico.
