= Polygrammodes phaeocraspis =

Scientific classification
- Kingdom: Animalia
- Phylum: Arthropoda
- Class: Insecta
- Order: Lepidoptera
- Family: Crambidae
- Genus: Polygrammodes
- Species: P. phaeocraspis

Binomial name
- Polygrammodes phaeocraspis Hampson, 1913

Species of moth

Polygrammodes phaeocraspis is a moth in the family Crambidae. It was described by George Hampson in 1913. It is found in Peru.
