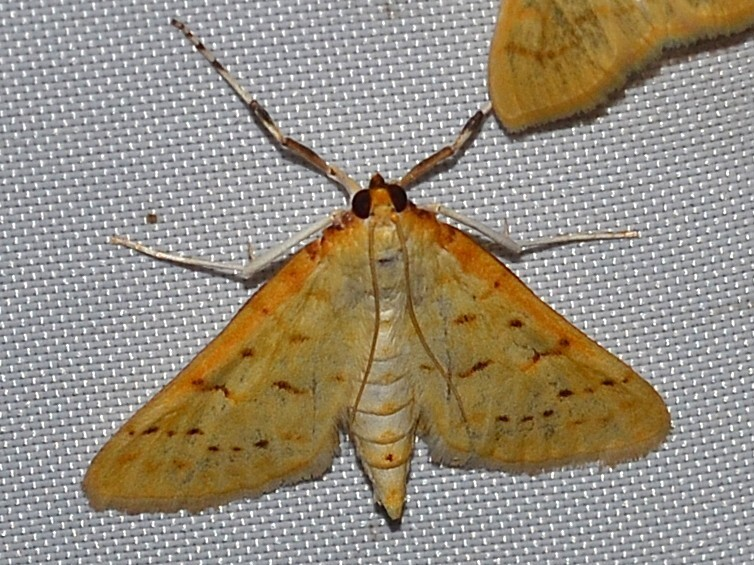

Scientific classification
- Kingdom: Animalia
- Phylum: Arthropoda
- Class: Insecta
- Order: Lepidoptera
- Family: Crambidae
- Genus: Polygrammodes
- Species: P. oxydalis

Binomial name
- Polygrammodes oxydalis (Guenée, 1854)

Synonyms
- Botys oxydalis Guenée, 1854

= Polygrammodes oxydalis =

Species of moth

Polygrammodes oxydalis is a species of moth in the family Crambidae. It was first described by Achille Guenée in 1854. It is found in the southern United States, where it has been recorded from Georgia, Florida and southern Texas. It has also been reported from Costa Rica. Adults have been recorded on wing from May to October. The larvae feed on the roots of Vernonia species.
