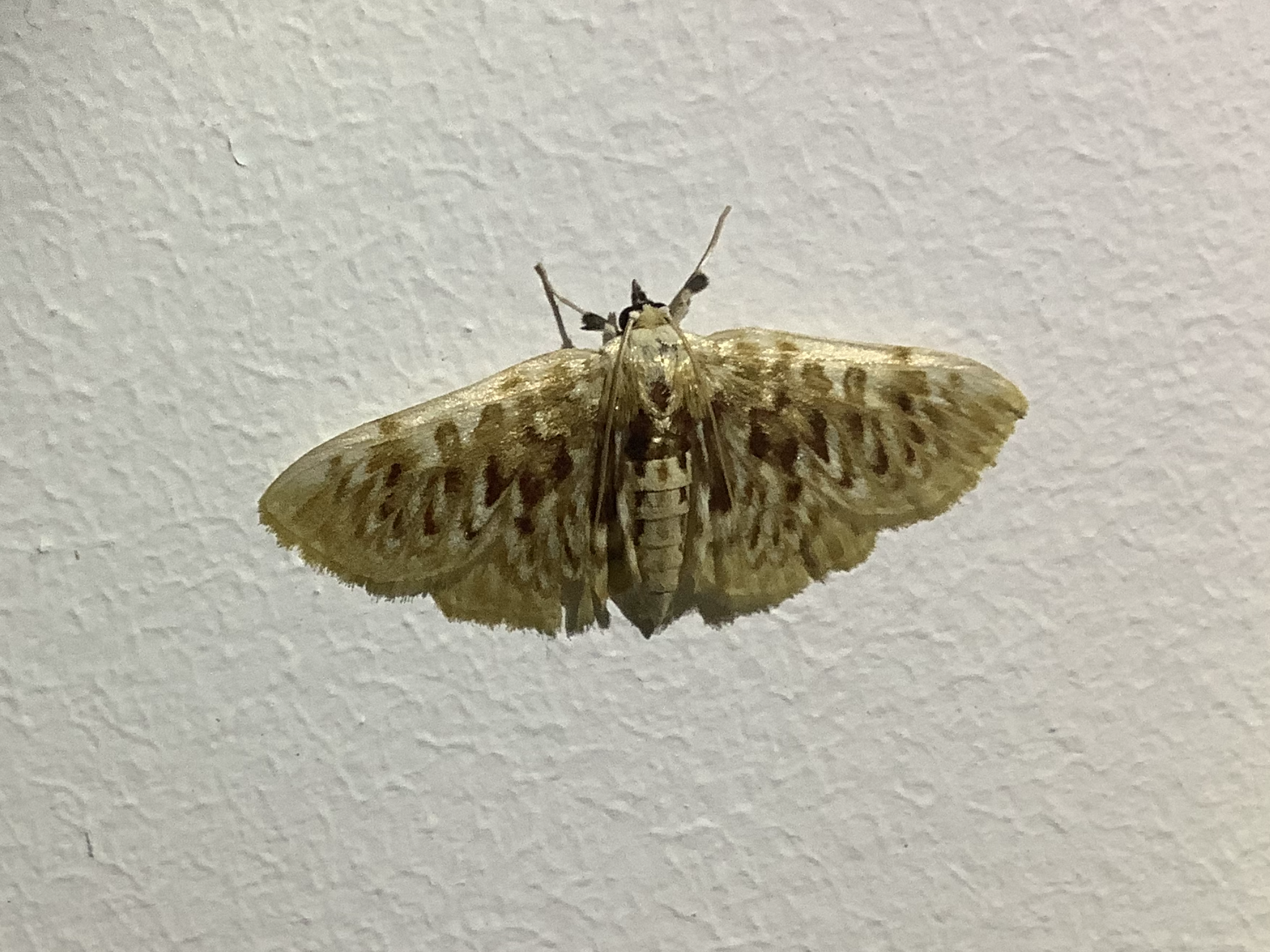

Scientific classification
- Kingdom: Animalia
- Phylum: Arthropoda
- Class: Insecta
- Order: Lepidoptera
- Family: Crambidae
- Genus: Polygrammodes
- Species: P. sanguinalis

Binomial name
- Polygrammodes sanguinalis H. Druce, 1895

= Polygrammodes sanguinalis =

Species of moth

Polygrammodes sanguinalis is a moth in the family Crambidae. It was described by Herbert Druce in 1895. It is found in Texas, Mexico (Veracruz), Guatemala, Costa Rica and Panama.

The forewings and hindwings are white, crossed from the costal to the inner margin by a series of reddish-brown zigzag lines, which become broader near the base. Adults are on wing from September to October.
