= Polygrammodes cuneatalis =

Scientific classification
- Kingdom: Animalia
- Phylum: Arthropoda
- Class: Insecta
- Order: Lepidoptera
- Family: Crambidae
- Genus: Polygrammodes
- Species: P. cuneatalis

Binomial name
- Polygrammodes cuneatalis Dognin, 1908

Species of moth

Polygrammodes cuneatalis is a moth in the family Crambidae. It was described by Paul Dognin in 1908. It is found in Peru.
