= Polygrammodes quatrilis =

Scientific classification
- Kingdom: Animalia
- Phylum: Arthropoda
- Class: Insecta
- Order: Lepidoptera
- Family: Crambidae
- Genus: Polygrammodes
- Species: P. quatrilis

Binomial name
- Polygrammodes quatrilis (H. Druce, 1902)

Synonyms
- Lygropia quatrilis H. Druce, 1902; Polygrammodes nigrifrons Dognin, 1903

Species of moth

Polygrammodes quatrilis is a moth in the family Crambidae. It was described by Herbert Druce in 1902. It is found in Venezuela and Colombia.

The forewings are white, although the costal margin and all the veins are black. The hindwings are semihyaline white. The fringes of both wings are white.
