= Pachynoa mineusalis =

Scientific classification
- Kingdom: Animalia
- Phylum: Arthropoda
- Class: Insecta
- Order: Lepidoptera
- Family: Crambidae
- Genus: Pachynoa
- Species: P. mineusalis

Binomial name
- Pachynoa mineusalis (Walker, 1859)

Synonyms
- Zebronia mineusalis Walker, 1859

Species of moth

Pachynoa mineusalis is a moth in the family Crambidae. It was described by Francis Walker in 1859. It is found in India.
