= Pachynoa xanthochyta =

Scientific classification
- Kingdom: Animalia
- Phylum: Arthropoda
- Clade: Pancrustacea
- Class: Insecta
- Order: Lepidoptera
- Family: Crambidae
- Genus: Pachynoa
- Species: P. xanthochyta

Binomial name
- Pachynoa xanthochyta (Turner, 1933)

Synonyms
- Hypermeces xanthochyta Turner, 1933

Species of moth

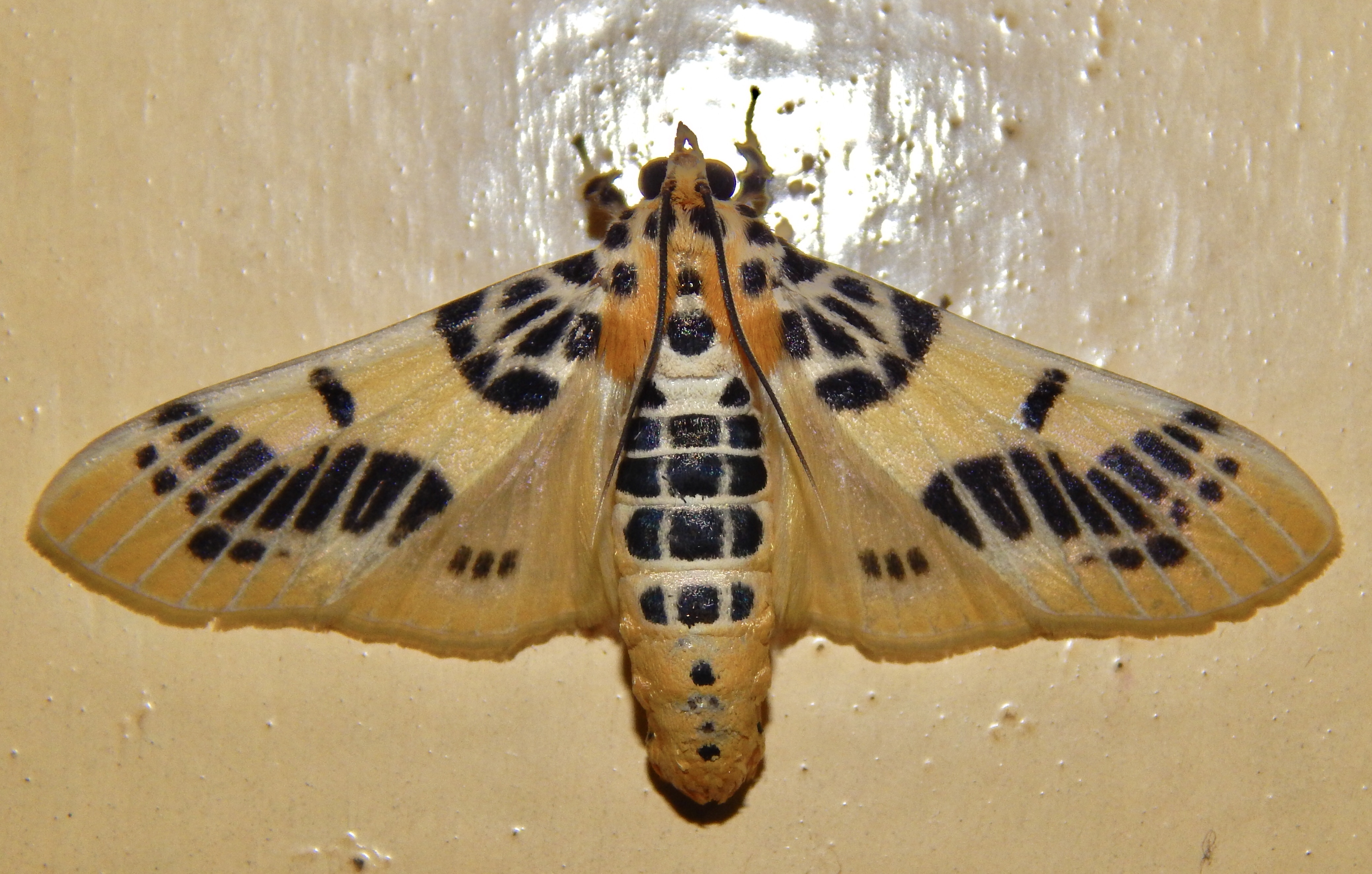

Pachynoa xanthochyta is a moth in the family Crambidae. It was described by Turner in 1933 and originally found in Australia, where it has been recorded from Queensland. Later records indicate the species range may extend across Asia, for example to include Bhutan, Laos, and even India (Andaman and Nicobar Islands). However, these latter localities then are geographically close to historical records of Pachynoa spilosomoides (Moore, 1886) described from Sri Lanka and later various Indian localities by Hampson, 1896. In a paper by Rao & Sivaperuman, 2022 which gave the first Indian records for "Pachynoa xanthochyta" (p.24) they list five species of Pachynoa were previously recorded from India - but without mention of Pachynoa spilosomoides (Moore, 1886)

The wingspan is about 30 mm. The wings are translucent yellow with black markings.
