= Polygrammodes leucalis =

Scientific classification
- Kingdom: Animalia
- Phylum: Arthropoda
- Class: Insecta
- Order: Lepidoptera
- Family: Crambidae
- Genus: Polygrammodes
- Species: P. leucalis

Binomial name
- Polygrammodes leucalis (Guenée, 1854)

Synonyms
- Botys leucalis Guenée, 1854

Species of moth

Polygrammodes leucalis is a moth in the family Crambidae. It was described by Achille Guenée in 1854. It is found in Brazil.
