= Polygrammodes farinalis =

Scientific classification
- Kingdom: Animalia
- Phylum: Arthropoda
- Class: Insecta
- Order: Lepidoptera
- Family: Crambidae
- Genus: Polygrammodes
- Species: P. farinalis

Binomial name
- Polygrammodes farinalis Hampson, 1899

Species of moth

Polygrammodes farinalis is a moth in the family Crambidae. It is found in Brazil (São Paulo).

The wingspan is about 38 mm. Adults are white slightly suffused with fuscous brown, the forewings with brown costal fascia and a sinuous antemedial line. There is a spot in the cell and minutely waved and slightly curved medial and postmedial lines, as well as a crenulate submarginal line. The hindwings are pure white, with traced of a curved postmedial line and a marginal series of specks.
