= Polygrammodes sanguifrons =

Scientific classification
- Kingdom: Animalia
- Phylum: Arthropoda
- Class: Insecta
- Order: Lepidoptera
- Family: Crambidae
- Genus: Polygrammodes
- Species: P. sanguifrons

Binomial name
- Polygrammodes sanguifrons Hampson, 1913

Species of moth

Polygrammodes sanguifrons is a moth in the family Crambidae. It was described by George Hampson in 1913. It is found in Peru.

The wingspan is about 52 mm. The forewings are pale yellow, the veins and costal area deeper yellow and the costal edge black to beyond the middle. There is an antemedial pale fuscous point below the cell and a faint fuscous discoidal mark. The postmedial line is pale fuscous and there is a subterminal series of pale fuscous spots in the interspaces. The hindwings are pale yellow, the termen deeper yellow and the postmedial line pale fulvous, arising as a spot in the discal fold. There is a subterminal series of pale fuscous spots from the costa to vein 2, below which it terminates in an oblique striga.
