= Polygrammodes lichyi =

Scientific classification
- Kingdom: Animalia
- Phylum: Arthropoda
- Class: Insecta
- Order: Lepidoptera
- Family: Crambidae
- Genus: Polygrammodes
- Species: P. lichyi

Binomial name
- Polygrammodes lichyi Munroe, 1958

Species of moth

Polygrammodes lichyi is a moth in the family Crambidae. It was described by Eugene G. Munroe in 1958. It is found in Venezuela.
