= Polygrammodes pareaclealis =

Scientific classification
- Kingdom: Animalia
- Phylum: Arthropoda
- Class: Insecta
- Order: Lepidoptera
- Family: Crambidae
- Genus: Polygrammodes
- Species: P. pareaclealis

Binomial name
- Polygrammodes pareaclealis Munroe, 1958

Species of moth

Polygrammodes pareaclealis is a moth in the family Crambidae. It was described by Eugene G. Munroe in 1958. It is found in Bolivia.
