= Polygrammodes senahuensis =

Scientific classification
- Kingdom: Animalia
- Phylum: Arthropoda
- Class: Insecta
- Order: Lepidoptera
- Family: Crambidae
- Genus: Polygrammodes
- Species: P. senahuensis

Binomial name
- Polygrammodes senahuensis (H. Druce, 1895)

Synonyms
- Aphytoceros senahuensis H. Druce, 1895

Species of moth

Polygrammodes senahuensis is a moth in the family Crambidae. It was described by Herbert Druce in 1895. It is found in Guatemala.

The forewings and hindwings are cream coloured with reddish-brown veins and fine lines crossing the wings from the costal to the inner margin. The marginal line is dark brown.
