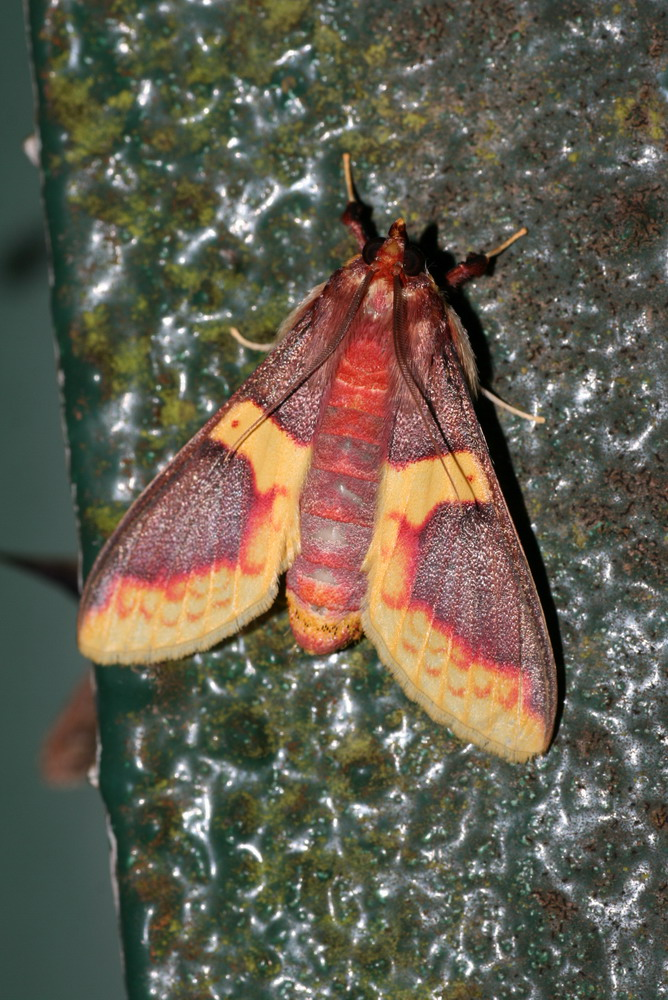
- Pachynoa purpuralis

Scientific classification
- Kingdom: Animalia
- Phylum: Arthropoda
- Clade: Pancrustacea
- Class: Insecta
- Order: Lepidoptera
- Family: Crambidae
- Tribe: Margaroniini
- Genus: Pachynoa; Lederer, 1863

Synonyms
- Hypermeces Turner, 1933; Pitacanda Moore, 1886

= Pachynoa =

Genus of moths

Pachynoa is a genus of moths of the family Crambidae.

== Species ==
- Pachynoa circulalis Sauber in Semper, 1899
- Pachynoa fruhstorferi E. Hering, 1903
- Pachynoa fuscilalis Hampson, 1891
- Pachynoa grossalis (Guenée, 1854)
- Pachynoa hyalosticta (Hampson, 1899)
- Pachynoa hypsalis Hampson, 1896
- Pachynoa interrupta Whalley, 1962
- Pachynoa limitata Warren, 1892
- Pachynoa mineusalis (Walker, 1859)
- Pachynoa purpuralis Walker, 1866
- Pachynoa sabelialis (Guenée, 1854)
- Pachynoa spilosomoides (Moore, 1886)
- Pachynoa thoosalis (Walker, 1859)
- Pachynoa umbrigera Meyrick, 1938
- Pachynoa xanthochyta Turner, 1933
