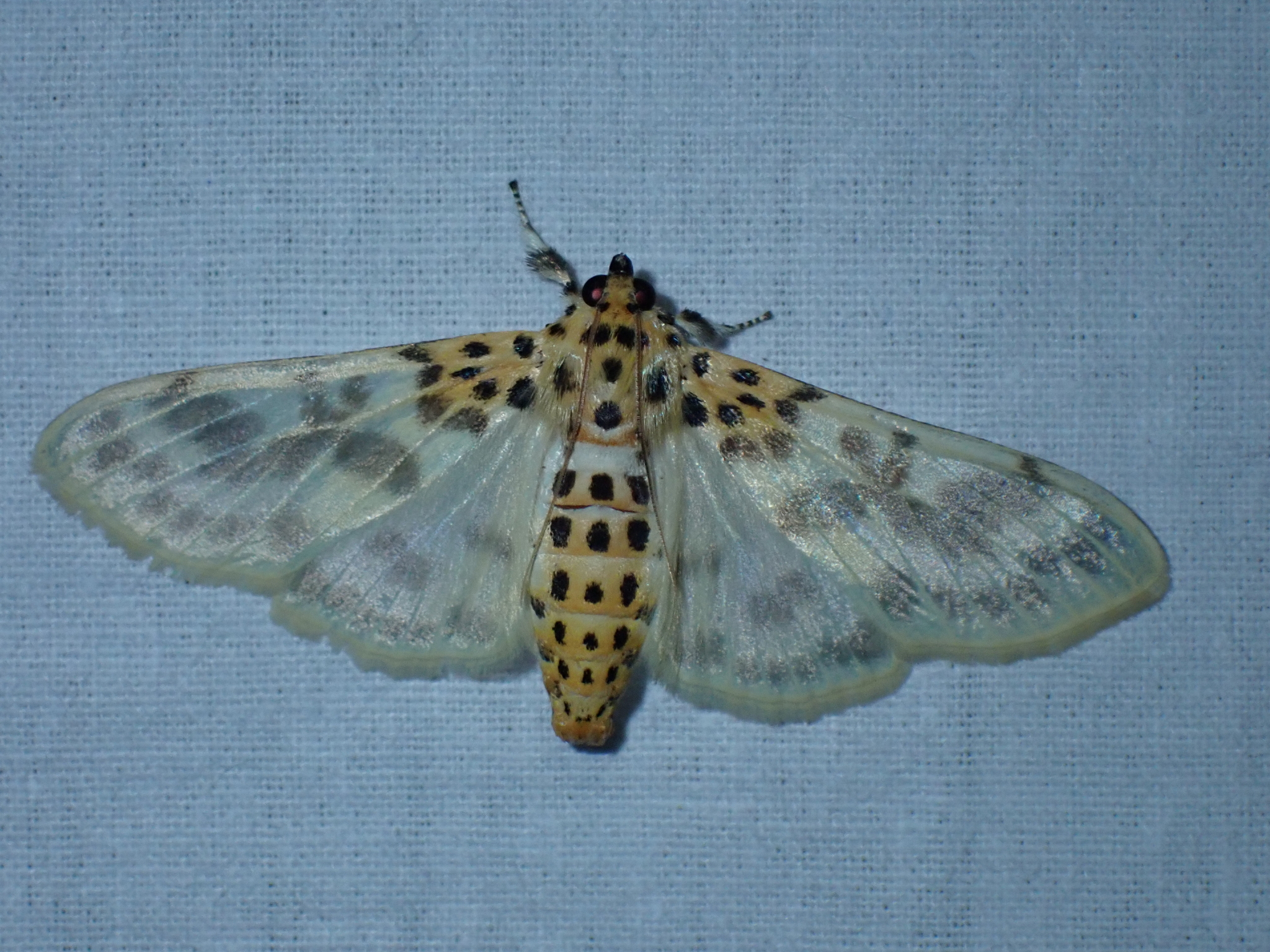

Scientific classification
- Kingdom: Animalia
- Phylum: Arthropoda
- Class: Insecta
- Order: Lepidoptera
- Family: Crambidae
- Genus: Pachynoa
- Species: P. hypsalis

Binomial name
- Pachynoa hypsalis Hampson, 1896

= Pachynoa hypsalis =

Species of moth

Pachynoa hypsalis is a moth in the family Crambidae. It was described by George Hampson in 1896. It is found in Sikkim, India.
