= Polygrammodes fluminalis =

Scientific classification
- Kingdom: Animalia
- Phylum: Arthropoda
- Class: Insecta
- Order: Lepidoptera
- Family: Crambidae
- Genus: Polygrammodes
- Species: P. fluminalis

Binomial name
- Polygrammodes fluminalis (Butler, 1883)

Synonyms
- Astura fluminalis Butler, 1883

Species of moth

Polygrammodes fluminalis is a moth in the family Crambidae. It was described by Arthur Gardiner Butler in 1883. It is found in Fiji.
