= Polygrammodes naranja =

Scientific classification
- Kingdom: Animalia
- Phylum: Arthropoda
- Class: Insecta
- Order: Lepidoptera
- Family: Crambidae
- Genus: Polygrammodes
- Species: P. naranja

Binomial name
- Polygrammodes naranja Munroe, 1959

Species of moth

Polygrammodes naranja is a moth in the family Crambidae. It was described by Eugene G. Munroe in 1959. It is found in Nayarit, Mexico.
