= Polygrammodes citrinalis =

Scientific classification
- Kingdom: Animalia
- Phylum: Arthropoda
- Class: Insecta
- Order: Lepidoptera
- Family: Crambidae
- Genus: Polygrammodes
- Species: P. citrinalis

Binomial name
- Polygrammodes citrinalis Hampson, 1913

Species of moth

Polygrammodes citrinalis is a moth in the family Crambidae. It was described by George Hampson in 1913. It is found in Papua New Guinea.

The wingspan is 38–40 mm. The forewings are yellow irrorated with brown and with a brown costal edge. The antemedial line is brown and the orbicular and reniform spots have whitish centres defined by brown. The postmedial line is brown and there is a rather diffused, creuulate, brown subterminal line. The hindwings are yellowish white with a brown subterminal line.
