= Polygrammodes runicalis =

Scientific classification
- Kingdom: Animalia
- Phylum: Arthropoda
- Class: Insecta
- Order: Lepidoptera
- Family: Crambidae
- Genus: Polygrammodes
- Species: P. runicalis

Binomial name
- Polygrammodes runicalis Guenée, 1854

Synonyms
- Polygrammodes arpialis Schaus, 1920

Species of moth

Polygrammodes runicalis is a moth in the family Crambidae. It was described by Achille Guenée in 1854. It is found in Brazil.

The wingspan is about 53 mm. The wings are yellow, darkest terminally, on the basal half of the forewings and along the inner margin of the hindwings. The markings are fuscous purple with thick subterminal spots or lunules on the interspaces.
