= Polygrammodes faraonyalis =

Scientific classification
- Kingdom: Animalia
- Phylum: Arthropoda
- Clade: Pancrustacea
- Class: Insecta
- Order: Lepidoptera
- Family: Crambidae
- Genus: Polygrammodes
- Species: P. faraonyalis

Binomial name
- Polygrammodes faraonyalis Viette, 1954

Species of moth

Polygrammodes faraonyalis is a moth in the family Crambidae. It was described by Viette in 1954. It is found in Madagascar.
