= Polygrammodes hyalomaculata =

Scientific classification
- Kingdom: Animalia
- Phylum: Arthropoda
- Class: Insecta
- Order: Lepidoptera
- Family: Crambidae
- Genus: Polygrammodes
- Species: P. hyalomaculata

Binomial name
- Polygrammodes hyalomaculata Dognin, 1908

Species of moth

Polygrammodes hyalomaculata is a moth in the family Crambidae. It was described by Paul Dognin in 1908. It is found in Peru and Guatemala.

== Subspecies ==
- Polygrammodes hyalomaculata hyalomaculata (Peru)
- Polygrammodes hyalomaculata septentrionalis Munroe, 1958 (Guatemala)
