= Pachynoa grossalis =

Scientific classification
- Kingdom: Animalia
- Phylum: Arthropoda
- Class: Insecta
- Order: Lepidoptera
- Family: Crambidae
- Genus: Pachynoa
- Species: P. grossalis

Binomial name
- Pachynoa grossalis (Guenée, 1854)

Synonyms
- Botys grossalis Guenée, 1854

Species of moth

Pachynoa grossalis is a moth in the family Crambidae. It was described by Achille Guenée in 1854. It is found in Java, Indonesia.
