= Polygrammodes herminealis =

Scientific classification
- Kingdom: Animalia
- Phylum: Arthropoda
- Class: Insecta
- Order: Lepidoptera
- Family: Crambidae
- Genus: Polygrammodes
- Species: P. herminealis

Binomial name
- Polygrammodes herminealis Schaus, 1920

Species of moth

Polygrammodes herminealis is a moth in the family Crambidae. It was described by William Schaus in 1920. It is found in Brazil (Paraná).

The wingspan is about 32mm. The wings are white with marginal orange spots on the interspaces. There is a basal orange streak on the forewings, from the costa to the submedian. There is also a subbasal black point on the costa, and smaller dark brown points below the median and on the inner margin, as well as an antemedial orange brown lunule in the cell and a dark brown vertical streak below the cell. There is a point on the inner margin, a medial dark brown vertical streak below the subcostal, and a similar streak on the discocellular, a medial vertical streak on the inner margin and short streaks above and below vein 4 near the cell, as well as fine postmedial and subterminal vertical streaks on the interspaces and a few dark brown streaks on the inner margin postmedially. The hindwings have a few brown scales in the end of the cell, short streaks above and below vein 4 and an outcurved fine postmedial line broadly interrupted by veins.

The subterminal line is similar, but more heavily marked and parallel with the outer margin.
