= Polygrammodes delicata =

Scientific classification
- Kingdom: Animalia
- Phylum: Arthropoda
- Class: Insecta
- Order: Lepidoptera
- Family: Crambidae
- Genus: Polygrammodes
- Species: P. delicata

Binomial name
- Polygrammodes delicata Munroe, 1960

Species of moth

Polygrammodes delicata is a moth in the family Crambidae. It was described by Eugene G. Munroe in 1960. It is found in Ecuador.
