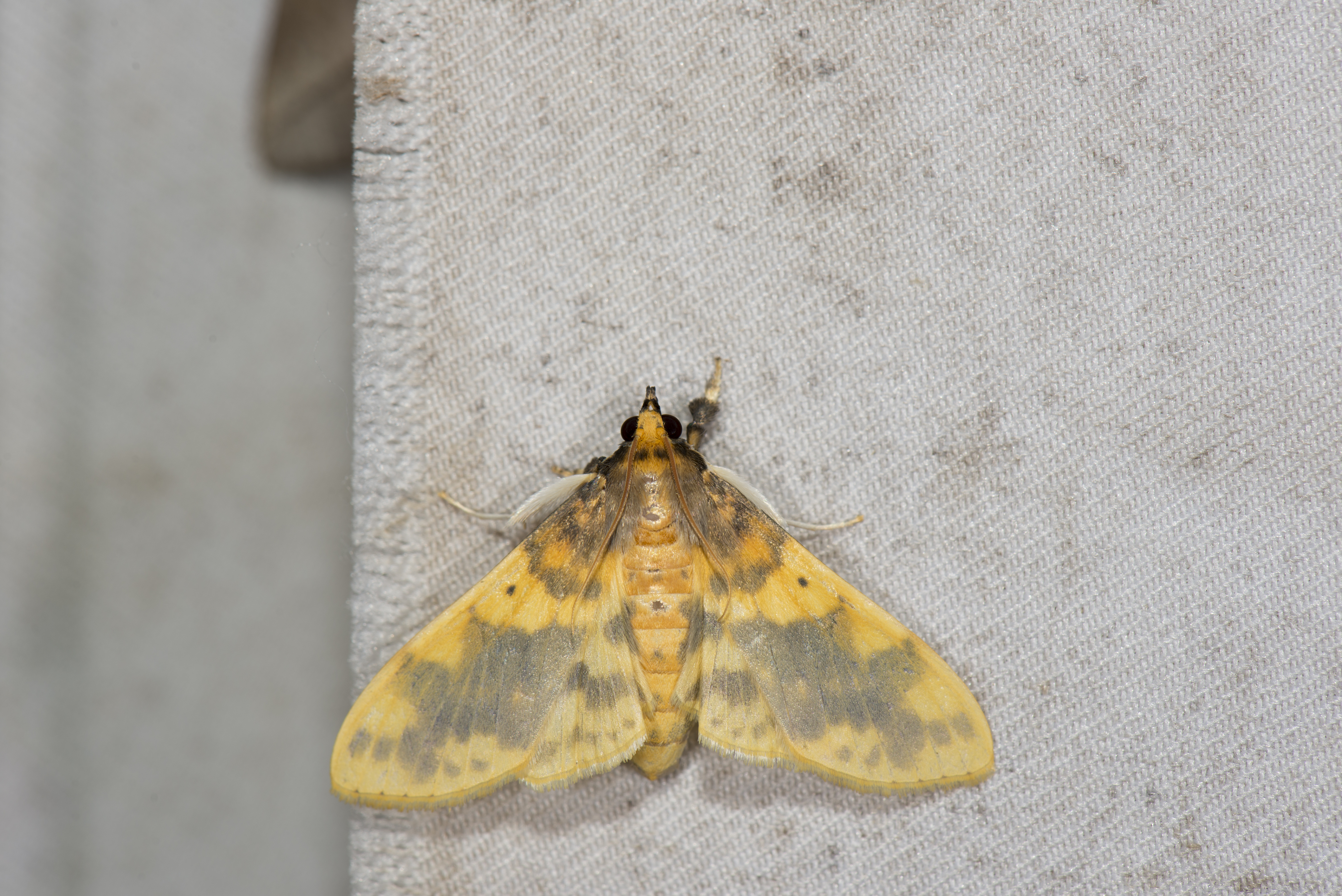

Scientific classification
- Kingdom: Animalia
- Phylum: Arthropoda
- Class: Insecta
- Order: Lepidoptera
- Family: Crambidae
- Genus: Pachynoa
- Species: P. thoosalis

Binomial name
- Pachynoa thoosalis (Walker, 1859)

Synonyms
- Botys thoosalis Walker, 1859; Pachynoa walkeri Lederer, 1863

= Pachynoa thoosalis =

Species of moth

Pachynoa thoosalis is a moth in the family Crambidae. It was described by Francis Walker in 1859. It is found in India, Papua New Guinea and Taiwan.
