= Polygrammodes ponderalis =

Scientific classification
- Kingdom: Animalia
- Phylum: Arthropoda
- Class: Insecta
- Order: Lepidoptera
- Family: Crambidae
- Genus: Polygrammodes
- Species: P. ponderalis

Binomial name
- Polygrammodes ponderalis (Guenée, 1854)

Synonyms
- Botys ponderalis Guenée, 1854; Botys humeralis Walker, 1866; Polygrammodes ponderalis ab. hyalodiscalis Dognin, 1908

Species of moth

Polygrammodes ponderalis is a moth in the family Crambidae. It was described by Achille Guenée in 1854. It is found in Brazil, Colombia and Peru.
