= Polygrammodes ephremalis =

Scientific classification
- Kingdom: Animalia
- Phylum: Arthropoda
- Class: Insecta
- Order: Lepidoptera
- Family: Crambidae
- Genus: Polygrammodes
- Species: P. ephremalis

Binomial name
- Polygrammodes ephremalis Schaus, 1927

Species of moth

Polygrammodes ephremalis is a moth in the family Crambidae. It was described by Schaus in 1927. It is found in the Philippines (Mindanao, Luzon).
