= Pachynoa fuscilalis =

Scientific classification
- Kingdom: Animalia
- Phylum: Arthropoda
- Class: Insecta
- Order: Lepidoptera
- Family: Crambidae
- Genus: Pachynoa
- Species: P. fuscilalis

Binomial name
- Pachynoa fuscilalis Hampson, 1891

Species of moth

Pachynoa fuscilalis is a moth in the family Crambidae. It was described by George Hampson in 1891. It is found in India's Nilgiri Mountains.
