= Polygrammodes seyrigalis =

Scientific classification
- Kingdom: Animalia
- Phylum: Arthropoda
- Clade: Pancrustacea
- Class: Insecta
- Order: Lepidoptera
- Family: Crambidae
- Genus: Polygrammodes
- Species: P. seyrigalis

Binomial name
- Polygrammodes seyrigalis Viette, 1953

Species of moth

Polygrammodes seyrigalis is a moth in the family Crambidae. It was described by Viette in 1953. It is found in Madagascar.
