= Polygrammodes nervosa =

Scientific classification
- Kingdom: Animalia
- Phylum: Arthropoda
- Class: Insecta
- Order: Lepidoptera
- Family: Crambidae
- Genus: Polygrammodes
- Species: P. nervosa

Binomial name
- Polygrammodes nervosa (Warren, 1889)

Synonyms
- Hoterodes nervosa Warren, 1889; Lygropia albida H. Druce, 1902

Species of moth

Polygrammodes nervosa is a moth in the family Crambidae. It was described by William Warren in 1889. It is found in Brazil and Ecuador.

The forewings and hindwings are semihyaline white, the costal margin of the forewings is shaded with grey. Females are very similar to males but rather larger and much greyer.
