= Pachynoa circulalis =

Scientific classification
- Kingdom: Animalia
- Phylum: Arthropoda
- Class: Insecta
- Order: Lepidoptera
- Family: Crambidae
- Genus: Pachynoa
- Species: P. circulalis

Binomial name
- Pachynoa circulalis Sauber in Semper, 1899

Synonyms
- Polygrammodes circulalis

Species of moth

Pachynoa circulalis is a moth in the family Crambidae. It was described by Sauber in 1899. It is found in the Philippines.
