= Polygrammodes hyalescens =

Scientific classification
- Kingdom: Animalia
- Phylum: Arthropoda
- Class: Insecta
- Order: Lepidoptera
- Family: Crambidae
- Genus: Polygrammodes
- Species: P. hyalescens

Binomial name
- Polygrammodes hyalescens Hampson, 1913

Species of moth

Polygrammodes hyalescens is a moth in the family Crambidae. It was described by George Hampson in 1913. It is found in Peru.

The wingspan is about 40 mm. The forewings are yellowish white and thinly scaled. The costal area is more ochreous and the costal edge is fuscous. There is a slight brownish antemedial spot in the cell and a faint excurved line from the cell to the inner margin, as well as a small brownish spot in the middle of the cell and a slight discoidal bar. The postmedial line is waved and pale brownish and there is a minutely waved brownish subterminal line and a brownish terminal line. The hindwings are semi-hyaline yellowish white, with a faint brownish postmedial line and a very indistinct, minutely waved, brownish subterminal line from the costa to the submedian fold.
