= Polygrammodes modestalis =

Scientific classification
- Kingdom: Animalia
- Phylum: Arthropoda
- Class: Insecta
- Order: Lepidoptera
- Family: Crambidae
- Genus: Polygrammodes
- Species: P. modestalis

Binomial name
- Polygrammodes modestalis Dyar, 1912

Synonyms
- Polygrammodes lauei Munroe, 1960

Species of moth

Polygrammodes modestalis is a moth in the family Crambidae. It was described by Harrison Gray Dyar Jr. in 1912. It is found in Mexico (Veracruz, Tecualpan).

The wingspan is about 44 mm. The wings are light brown, the forewings with the veins and lines dark brown. The cell is a little lighter as are the interspaces between the outer and subterminal lines. The costa and fringe are dark brown and the reniform (kidney-shaped) and orbicular spots are round, brown and fused to the edges of the cell. There is also a terminal row of pale yellowish marks. The hindwings are whitish and tinged with brown.
