= Polygrammodes hintzi =

Scientific classification
- Kingdom: Animalia
- Phylum: Arthropoda
- Class: Insecta
- Order: Lepidoptera
- Family: Crambidae
- Genus: Polygrammodes
- Species: P. hintzi

Binomial name
- Polygrammodes hintzi Strand, 1911

Species of moth

Polygrammodes hintzi is a moth in the family Crambidae. It was described by Strand in 1911. It is found in Cameroon.
