= Polygrammodes compositalis =

Scientific classification
- Kingdom: Animalia
- Phylum: Arthropoda
- Class: Insecta
- Order: Lepidoptera
- Family: Crambidae
- Genus: Polygrammodes
- Species: P. compositalis

Binomial name
- Polygrammodes compositalis (Lederer, 1863)

Synonyms
- Hilaopsis compositalis Lederer, 1863

Species of moth

Polygrammodes compositalis is a moth in the family Crambidae. It was described by Julius Lederer in 1863. It is found in Rio de Janeiro, Brazil.
