= Polygrammodes hyalosticta =

Scientific classification
- Kingdom: Animalia
- Phylum: Arthropoda
- Class: Insecta
- Order: Lepidoptera
- Family: Crambidae
- Genus: Polygrammodes
- Species: P. hyalosticta

Binomial name
- Polygrammodes hyalosticta Hampson, 1899

Species of moth

Polygrammodes hyalosticta is a moth in the family Crambidae. It is found in Indonesia, where it has been recorded from the Natuna Islands.

The wingspan is about 26 mm. The forewings are bright yellow, with a purplish red basal third, conjoined on the costal area to a triangular patch which is edged with red. There is a quadrate hyaline spot in the end of the cell, as well as a subterminal series of red points. The hindwings are bright yellow, with a purplish red basal third. There is an irregularly waved postmedial red line between veins 7 and 2, with a red point above vein 5, as well as a waved sinuous subterminal line.
