= Polygrammodes mimetica =

Scientific classification
- Kingdom: Animalia
- Phylum: Arthropoda
- Class: Insecta
- Order: Lepidoptera
- Family: Crambidae
- Genus: Polygrammodes
- Species: P. mimetica

Binomial name
- Polygrammodes mimetica Munroe, 1960

Species of insect

Polygrammodes mimetica is a moth in the family Crambidae. It was described by Eugene G. Munroe in 1960. It is found in Panama and Costa Rica.
