= Polygrammodes maculiferalis =

Scientific classification
- Kingdom: Animalia
- Phylum: Arthropoda
- Class: Insecta
- Order: Lepidoptera
- Family: Crambidae
- Genus: Polygrammodes
- Species: P. maculiferalis

Binomial name
- Polygrammodes maculiferalis (Dyar, 1910)

Synonyms
- Dichocrocopsis maculiferalis Dyar, 1910; Astura nigripunctalis Dognin, 1910; Astura nigropunctalis Munroe, 1956

Species of moth

Polygrammodes maculiferalis is a moth in the family Crambidae. It was described by Harrison Gray Dyar Jr. in 1910. It is found in Guyana and French Guiana.
