= Polygrammodes cyamon =

Scientific classification
- Kingdom: Animalia
- Phylum: Arthropoda
- Clade: Pancrustacea
- Class: Insecta
- Order: Lepidoptera
- Family: Crambidae
- Genus: Polygrammodes
- Species: P. cyamon

Binomial name
- Polygrammodes cyamon H. Druce, 1899

Species of moth

Polygrammodes cyamon is a moth in the family Crambidae. It was described by Herbert Druce in 1899. It is found in Oaxaca, Mexico.

The forewings are reddish brown, crossed about the middle by a darker brown band from the costal to the inner margin, which is edged with a narrow yellow line. There is an elongated white spot at the end of the cell. The hindwings are white, but the apex, outer margin and fringe are reddish brown.
