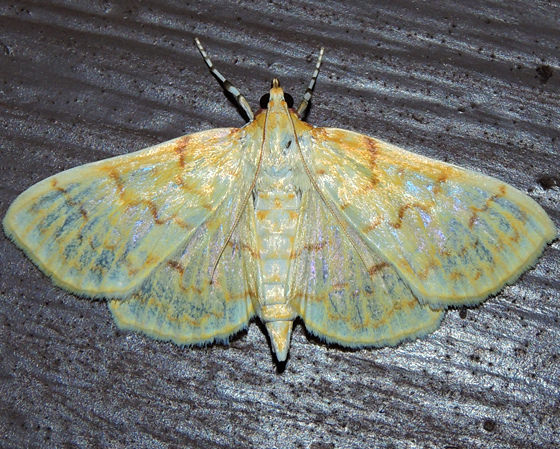

Scientific classification
- Kingdom: Animalia
- Phylum: Arthropoda
- Class: Insecta
- Order: Lepidoptera
- Family: Crambidae
- Genus: Polygrammodes
- Species: P. flavidalis

Binomial name
- Polygrammodes flavidalis (Guenée, 1854)

Synonyms
- Botys flavidalis Guenée, 1854; Botys cinctipedalis Walker, 1866; Botys lacoalis Walker, 1859

= Polygrammodes flavidalis =

Species of moth

Polygrammodes flavidalis, the ironweed root moth, is a moth in the family Crambidae. It is found in North America, where it has been recorded from Alabama, Florida, Georgia, Illinois, Indiana, Iowa, Kansas, Kentucky, Maryland, Mississippi, Missouri, New Jersey, North Carolina, Ohio, Oklahoma, Ontario, Pennsylvania, South Carolina, Tennessee, Texas, Virginia, West Virginia and Wisconsin.
