= Pachynoa sabelialis =

Scientific classification
- Kingdom: Animalia
- Phylum: Arthropoda
- Clade: Pancrustacea
- Class: Insecta
- Order: Lepidoptera
- Family: Crambidae
- Genus: Pachynoa
- Species: P. sabelialis

Binomial name
- Pachynoa sabelialis (Guenée, 1854)

Synonyms
- Botys sabelialis Guenée, 1854; Polygrammodes sabelialis (Guenée, 1854); Botys elycesalis Walker, 1859; Pachynoa melanopyga Strand, 1918; Pachynoa obstructalis Walker, 1866

Species of moth

Pachynoa sabelialis is a moth in the family Crambidae. It was described by Achille Guenée in 1854. It is found in India, Myanmar, China and Taiwan. Elsewhere, this taxon was previously called Polygrammodes sabelialis
