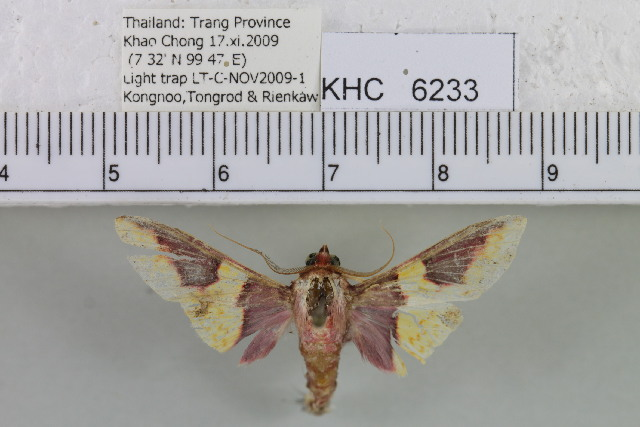

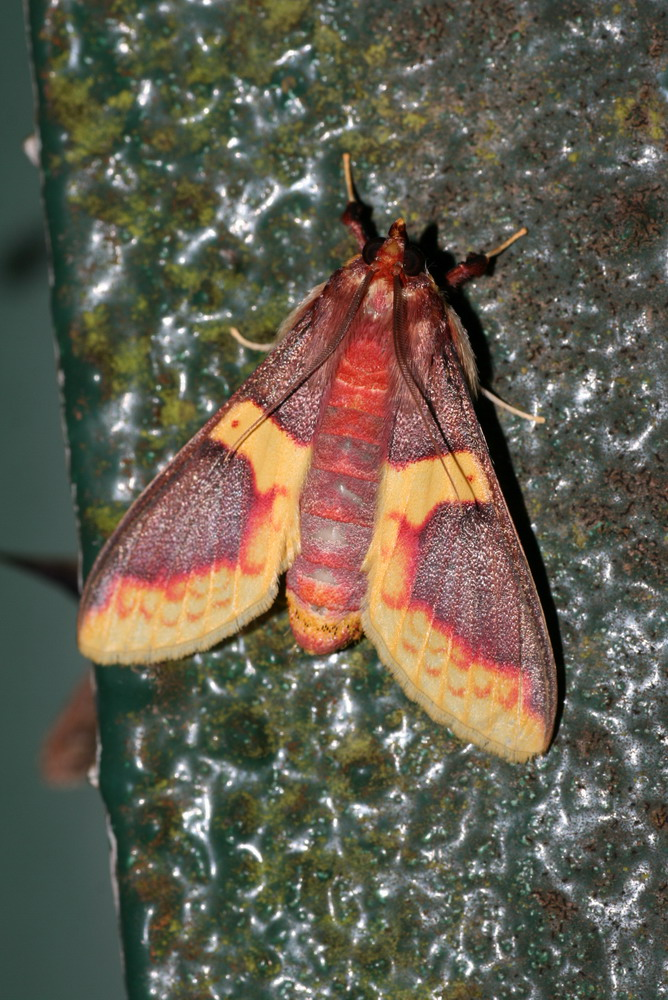

Scientific classification
- Kingdom: Animalia
- Phylum: Arthropoda
- Class: Insecta
- Order: Lepidoptera
- Family: Crambidae
- Genus: Pachynoa
- Species: P. purpuralis

Binomial name
- Pachynoa purpuralis Walker, 1866

Synonyms
- Polygrammodes purpuralis Walker, [1866]

= Pachynoa purpuralis =

Species of moth

Pachynoa purpuralis is a moth in the family Crambidae. It was described by Francis Walker in 1866. It is found in Indonesia (Java), Thailand, West Malaysia, Borneo, Sumatra and the Philippines.
