= Vilialis =

Vilialis may refer to:

- Marilena Vilialis-Soukoulis (born 1973), Greek politician
- Blepharomastix vilialis, species of moth
