= Blepharomastix glaucoleuca =

Scientific classification
- Kingdom: Animalia
- Phylum: Arthropoda
- Clade: Pancrustacea
- Class: Insecta
- Order: Lepidoptera
- Family: Crambidae
- Genus: Blepharomastix
- Species: B. glaucoleuca

Binomial name
- Blepharomastix glaucoleuca (Hampson, 1913)

Synonyms
- Pyrausta glaucoleuca Hampson, 1913; Oeobia antinephes Meyrick, 1936

Species of moth

Blepharomastix glaucoleuca is a species of moth in the family Crambidae. It is found in Peru and Bolivia.

The wingspan is 26–28 mm. The forewings are grey, with a faint lilac tinge. The hindwings are white with a fine dark grey terminal line.
