= Blepharomastix caclamalis =

Scientific classification
- Kingdom: Animalia
- Phylum: Arthropoda
- Clade: Pancrustacea
- Class: Insecta
- Order: Lepidoptera
- Family: Crambidae
- Genus: Blepharomastix
- Species: B. caclamalis

Binomial name
- Blepharomastix caclamalis (Schaus, 1924)

Synonyms
- Stenia caclamalis Schaus, 1924

Species of moth

Blepharomastix caclamalis is a species of moth in the family Crambidae. It was described by William Schaus in 1924. It is found in Colombia.

== Description ==
The wingspan is about 22 mm. The forewings are white, the costa and termen broadly suffused with drab. The hindwings are semihyaline white with some drab shading and terminal points at the apex.
