= Blepharomastix pseudoranalis =

Scientific classification
- Kingdom: Animalia
- Phylum: Arthropoda
- Clade: Pancrustacea
- Class: Insecta
- Order: Lepidoptera
- Family: Crambidae
- Genus: Blepharomastix
- Species: B. pseudoranalis

Binomial name
- Blepharomastix pseudoranalis (Barnes & McDunnough, 1914)

Synonyms
- Pyrausta pseudoranalis Barnes & McDunnough, 1914

Species of moth

Blepharomastix pseudoranalis is a species of moth in the family Crambidae first described by William Barnes and James Halliday McDunnough in 1914. It is found in North America, where it has been recorded from Arizona.

== Description ==
The wingspan is about 24 mm. The wings are pale ochreous, slightly sprinkled with brown scales The lines on the forewings are dark, the terminal line dotted. Adults have been recorded on wing in July and August.
