= Blepharomastix stenialis =

Scientific classification
- Kingdom: Animalia
- Phylum: Arthropoda
- Clade: Pancrustacea
- Class: Insecta
- Order: Lepidoptera
- Family: Crambidae
- Genus: Blepharomastix
- Species: B. stenialis

Binomial name
- Blepharomastix stenialis (Dyar, 1914)

Synonyms
- Pyrausta stenialis Dyar, 1914

Species of moth

Blepharomastix stenialis is a species of moth in the family Crambidae. It was described by Harrison Gray Dyar Jr. in 1914. It is found in Mexico.
