= Blepharomastix herreralis =

Scientific classification
- Kingdom: Animalia
- Phylum: Arthropoda
- Clade: Pancrustacea
- Class: Insecta
- Order: Lepidoptera
- Family: Crambidae
- Genus: Blepharomastix
- Species: B. herreralis

Binomial name
- Blepharomastix herreralis (Schaus, 1924)

Synonyms
- Stenia herreralis Schaus, 1924

Species of moth

Blepharomastix herreralis is a species of moth in the family Crambidae. It was described by William Schaus in 1924. It is found in Guatemala.

== Description ==
The wingspan is about 18 mm. The forewings are whitish, thickly irrorated (sprinkled) with drab and with fine brown lines. The hindwings are white, thinly irrorated with drab on the outer half from the costa.
