= Blepharomastix aphenice =

Scientific classification
- Kingdom: Animalia
- Phylum: Arthropoda
- Clade: Pancrustacea
- Class: Insecta
- Order: Lepidoptera
- Family: Crambidae
- Genus: Blepharomastix
- Species: B. aphenice

Binomial name
- Blepharomastix aphenice (Hampson, 1907)

Synonyms
- Stenia aphenice Hampson, 1907

Species of moth

Blepharomastix aphenice is a species of moth in the family Crambidae. It was described by George Hampson in 1907. It is found in Veracruz, Mexico.
