= Blepharomastix epistenialis =

Scientific classification
- Kingdom: Animalia
- Phylum: Arthropoda
- Clade: Pancrustacea
- Class: Insecta
- Order: Lepidoptera
- Family: Crambidae
- Genus: Blepharomastix
- Species: B. epistenialis

Binomial name
- Blepharomastix epistenialis (Klima, 1939)

Synonyms
- Lamprosema epistenialis Klima, 1939; Nacoleia stenialis Hampson, 1912 (preocc.)

Species of moth

Blepharomastix epistenialis is a species of moth in the family Crambidae. It is found in Peru.
