= Blepharomastix guianalis =

Scientific classification
- Kingdom: Animalia
- Phylum: Arthropoda
- Clade: Pancrustacea
- Class: Insecta
- Order: Lepidoptera
- Family: Crambidae
- Genus: Blepharomastix
- Species: B. guianalis

Binomial name
- Blepharomastix guianalis (Schaus, 1924)

Synonyms
- Stenia guianalis Schaus, 1924

Species of moth

Blepharomastix guianalis is a species of moth in the family Crambidae. It was described by William Schaus in 1924. It is found in French Guiana.

The wingspan is about 15 mm. The wings are white with lines of isabella colour. The forewing costa is suffused with light drab on the basal half.
