= Blepharomastix randalis =

Scientific classification
- Kingdom: Animalia
- Phylum: Arthropoda
- Clade: Pancrustacea
- Class: Insecta
- Order: Lepidoptera
- Family: Crambidae
- Genus: Blepharomastix
- Species: B. randalis

Binomial name
- Blepharomastix randalis (H. Druce, 1895)

Synonyms
- Ledereria randalis H. Druce, 1895

Species of moth

Blepharomastix randalis is a species of moth in the family Crambidae. It was described by Herbert Druce in 1895. It is known from Jalapa, Mexico.

== Description ==
The forewings and hindwings are silky white. The wingspan is 28 mm (1 1/10 in).
