= Blepharomastix stenothyris =

Scientific classification
- Kingdom: Animalia
- Phylum: Arthropoda
- Clade: Pancrustacea
- Class: Insecta
- Order: Lepidoptera
- Family: Crambidae
- Genus: Blepharomastix
- Species: B. stenothyris

Binomial name
- Blepharomastix stenothyris (Meyrick, 1936)

Synonyms
- Ichthyoptila stenothyris Meyrick, 1936

Species of moth

Blepharomastix stenothyris is a species of moth in the family Crambidae. It is found in Panama.
