= Blepharomastix paracausta =

Scientific classification
- Kingdom: Animalia
- Phylum: Arthropoda
- Clade: Pancrustacea
- Class: Insecta
- Order: Lepidoptera
- Family: Crambidae
- Genus: Blepharomastix
- Species: B. paracausta

Binomial name
- Blepharomastix paracausta Meyrick, 1934

Species of moth

Blepharomastix paracausta is a species of moth in the family Crambidae. It is found on the Solomon Islands.
