= Blepharomastix fusalis =

Scientific classification
- Kingdom: Animalia
- Phylum: Arthropoda
- Clade: Pancrustacea
- Class: Insecta
- Order: Lepidoptera
- Family: Crambidae
- Genus: Blepharomastix
- Species: B. fusalis

Binomial name
- Blepharomastix fusalis (Hampson, 1917)

Synonyms
- Stenia fusalis Hampson, 1917

Species of moth

Blepharomastix fusalis is a species of moth in the family Crambidae. It was described by George Hampson in 1917. It is found in Colombia.

== Description ==
The wingspan is about 28 mm. The forewings are pale red-brown with a cupreous gloss and thickly irrorated with dark brown, the costa is darker towards the base and there is an indistinct brown antemedial line, as well as a small white spot in the middle of the cell and a white discoidal bar. The postmedial line is dark and indistinct and there is a terminal series of black points. The hindwings are white, the terminal area tinged with cupreous red-brown except towards the tornus. There is a blackish discoidal point and an indistinct dark postmedial line and a terminal series of black bars.
