= Blepharomastix caulealis =

Scientific classification
- Kingdom: Animalia
- Phylum: Arthropoda
- Clade: Pancrustacea
- Class: Insecta
- Order: Lepidoptera
- Family: Crambidae
- Genus: Blepharomastix
- Species: B. caulealis

Binomial name
- Blepharomastix caulealis (Schaus, 1924)

Synonyms
- Stenia caulealis Schaus, 1924

Species of moth

Blepharomastix caulealis is a species of moth in the family Crambidae. It was described by William Schaus in 1924. It is found in Guatemala.

== Description ==
The wingspan is about 20 mm. The forewings are brown and the hindwings are semihyaline white, the termen suffused with brown.
