= Blepharomastix mononalis =

Scientific classification
- Kingdom: Animalia
- Phylum: Arthropoda
- Clade: Pancrustacea
- Class: Insecta
- Order: Lepidoptera
- Family: Crambidae
- Genus: Blepharomastix
- Species: B. mononalis

Binomial name
- Blepharomastix mononalis (Dyar, 1918)

Synonyms
- Stenia mononalis Dyar, 1918

Species of moth

Blepharomastix mononalis is a species of moth in the family Crambidae. It was described by Harrison Gray Dyar Jr. in 1918. It is found in Chiapas, Mexico.

== Description ==
The wingspan is about 17 mm. The forewings are pale straw colour, but darker at the tip. The costa is brown powdered up to two-thirds and there is a dot on the median vein at the base and on the internal margin. There is also a dot below on the submedian fold and there is a black dot on the costa at four-fifths, from which a straight brown line runs to the anal angle. The terminal line is dark brown. The hindwings have a nearly straight line from the discal dot to the tornus. The outer line runs from the costa at three-fourths to the discal fold.
