= Blepharomastix carthaghalis =

Scientific classification
- Kingdom: Animalia
- Phylum: Arthropoda
- Clade: Pancrustacea
- Class: Insecta
- Order: Lepidoptera
- Family: Crambidae
- Genus: Blepharomastix
- Species: B. carthaghalis

Binomial name
- Blepharomastix carthaghalis (Schaus, 1924)

Synonyms
- Stenia carthaghalis Schaus, 1924

Species of moth

Blepharomastix carthaghalis is a species of moth in the family Crambidae. It was described by William Schaus in 1924. It is found in Peru.

== Description ==
The wingspan is about 16 mm. The wings are whitish buff with fine brown lines and blackish terminal points. The forewing costal margin and postmedial area finely irrorated (sprinkled) with brown. The termen is suffused with wood brown. The hindwings contain a black spot on the discocellular.
