= Blepharomastix hydrothionalis =

Scientific classification
- Kingdom: Animalia
- Phylum: Arthropoda
- Clade: Pancrustacea
- Class: Insecta
- Order: Lepidoptera
- Family: Crambidae
- Genus: Blepharomastix
- Species: B. hydrothionalis

Binomial name
- Blepharomastix hydrothionalis (Snellen, 1875)

Synonyms
- Parapoynx hydrothionalis Snellen, 1875

Species of moth

Blepharomastix hydrothionalis is a species of moth in the family Crambidae. It is found in Colombia.
