= Blepharomastix fuscilunalis =

Scientific classification
- Kingdom: Animalia
- Phylum: Arthropoda
- Clade: Pancrustacea
- Class: Insecta
- Order: Lepidoptera
- Family: Crambidae
- Genus: Blepharomastix
- Species: B. fuscilunalis

Binomial name
- Blepharomastix fuscilunalis (Hampson, 1907)

Synonyms
- Stenia fuscilunalis Hampson, 1907

Species of moth

Blepharomastix fuscilunalis is a species of moth in the family Crambidae. It was described by George Hampson in 1907. It is found in Costa Rica, Guatemala and Panama.

== Description ==
The wingspan is about 20 mm. The forewings are white, the costal area suffused with fuscous brown and the apical area suffused with fuscous brown. The hindwings are white, with a slight dark discoidal lunule, with an oblique line from it to the tornus.
