= Blepharomastix glaucinalis =

Scientific classification
- Kingdom: Animalia
- Phylum: Arthropoda
- Clade: Pancrustacea
- Class: Insecta
- Order: Lepidoptera
- Family: Crambidae
- Genus: Blepharomastix
- Species: B. glaucinalis

Binomial name
- Blepharomastix glaucinalis (Hampson, 1917)

Synonyms
- Stenia glaucinalis Hampson, 1917

Species of moth

Blepharomastix glaucinalis is a species of moth in the family Crambidae. It was described by George Hampson in 1917. It is found in Bolivia.

The wingspan is about 22 mm (0.87 in). The forewings are glossy grey-brown with a white discoidal bar. The hindwings are pale glossy grey-brown.
