= Blepharomastix diaphanalis =

Scientific classification
- Kingdom: Animalia
- Phylum: Arthropoda
- Clade: Pancrustacea
- Class: Insecta
- Order: Lepidoptera
- Family: Crambidae
- Genus: Blepharomastix
- Species: B. diaphanalis

Binomial name
- Blepharomastix diaphanalis (Schaus, 1920)

Synonyms
- Lamprosema diaphanalis Schaus, 1920

Species of moth

Blepharomastix diaphanalis is a species of moth in the family Crambidae. It was described by William Schaus in 1920. It is found in Guatemala.

== Description ==
The wingspan is about 28 mm. The wings are thinly scaled with whitish yellow and the lines are fine and pale brown. The basal half of the costa of the forewings is shaded with purplish. The hindwings have a dark point on the discocellular.
