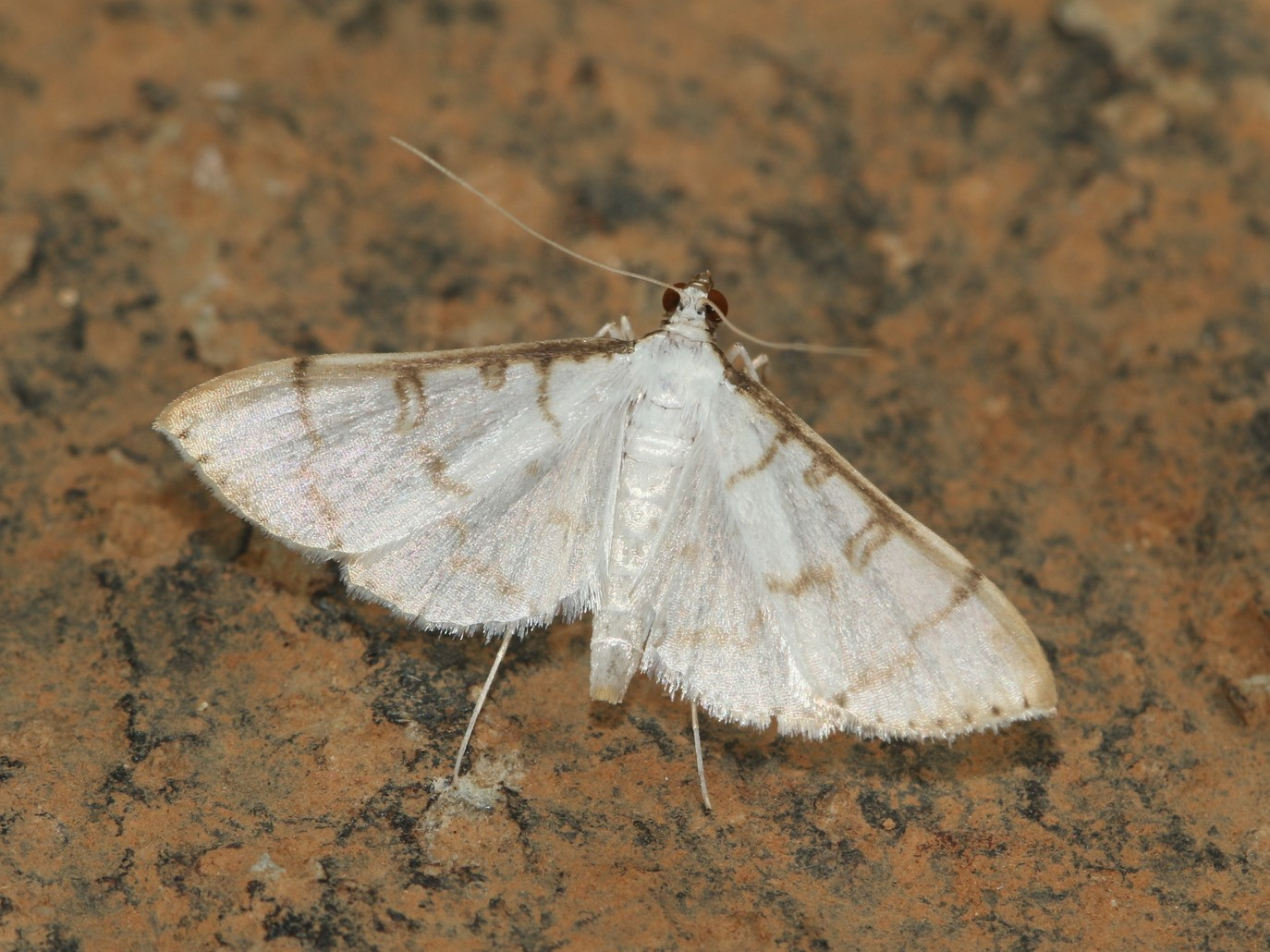

Scientific classification
- Kingdom: Animalia
- Phylum: Arthropoda
- Clade: Pancrustacea
- Class: Insecta
- Order: Lepidoptera
- Family: Crambidae
- Genus: Blepharomastix
- Species: B. ianthealis

Binomial name
- Blepharomastix ianthealis (Walker, 1859)

Synonyms
- Margaronia ianthealis Walker, 1859

= Blepharomastix ianthealis =

Species of moth

Blepharomastix ianthealis is a species of moth in the family Crambidae. It was described by Francis Walker in 1859. It is found in Colombia.
