= Blepharomastix obscura =

Scientific classification
- Kingdom: Animalia
- Phylum: Arthropoda
- Clade: Pancrustacea
- Class: Insecta
- Order: Lepidoptera
- Family: Crambidae
- Genus: Blepharomastix
- Species: B. obscura

Binomial name
- Blepharomastix obscura (Warren, 1889)

Synonyms
- Sozoa obscura Warren, 1889

Species of moth

Blepharomastix obscura is a species of moth in the family Crambidae. The species was first described by William Warren in 1889. It is found in Brazil.

== Description ==
The wingspan is about 20 mm. The forewings are uniform shining dingy grey, with an obscure dark spot at the end of the cell. The hindwings are a little darker.
