= Blepharomastix turiafalis =

Scientific classification
- Kingdom: Animalia
- Phylum: Arthropoda
- Clade: Pancrustacea
- Class: Insecta
- Order: Lepidoptera
- Family: Crambidae
- Genus: Blepharomastix
- Species: B. turiafalis

Binomial name
- Blepharomastix turiafalis (Schaus, 1924)

Synonyms
- Stenia turiafalis Schaus, 1924

Species of moth

Blepharomastix turiafalis is a species of moth in the family Crambidae. It was described by William Schaus in 1924. It is found in Peru.

== Description ==
The wingspan is about 20 mm. The wings are white with buffy-brown markings. The forewing costal margin is buffy brown.
