= Blepharomastix leucophaea =

Scientific classification
- Kingdom: Animalia
- Phylum: Arthropoda
- Clade: Pancrustacea
- Class: Insecta
- Order: Lepidoptera
- Family: Crambidae
- Genus: Blepharomastix
- Species: B. leucophaea

Binomial name
- Blepharomastix leucophaea (Hampson, 1912)

Synonyms
- Nacoleia leucophaea Hampson, 1912

Species of moth

Blepharomastix leucophaea is a species of moth in the family Crambidae. It was described by George Hampson in 1912. It is found in Panama.
