= Blepharomastix crusalis =

Scientific classification
- Kingdom: Animalia
- Phylum: Arthropoda
- Clade: Pancrustacea
- Class: Insecta
- Order: Lepidoptera
- Family: Crambidae
- Genus: Blepharomastix
- Species: B. crusalis

Binomial name
- Blepharomastix crusalis H. Druce, 1895

Species of moth

Blepharomastix crusalis is a species of moth in the family Crambidae. It was described by Herbert Druce in 1895. It is found in Veracruz, Mexico.

== Description ==
The wingspan is about 25 mm. The forewings and hindwings are pale fawn. The forewings edged with brown along the costal margin. There is a spot in the cell and there are three dark brown bands crossing the wing. The hindwings are crossed by two brown bands, the marginal line is spotted with brown.
