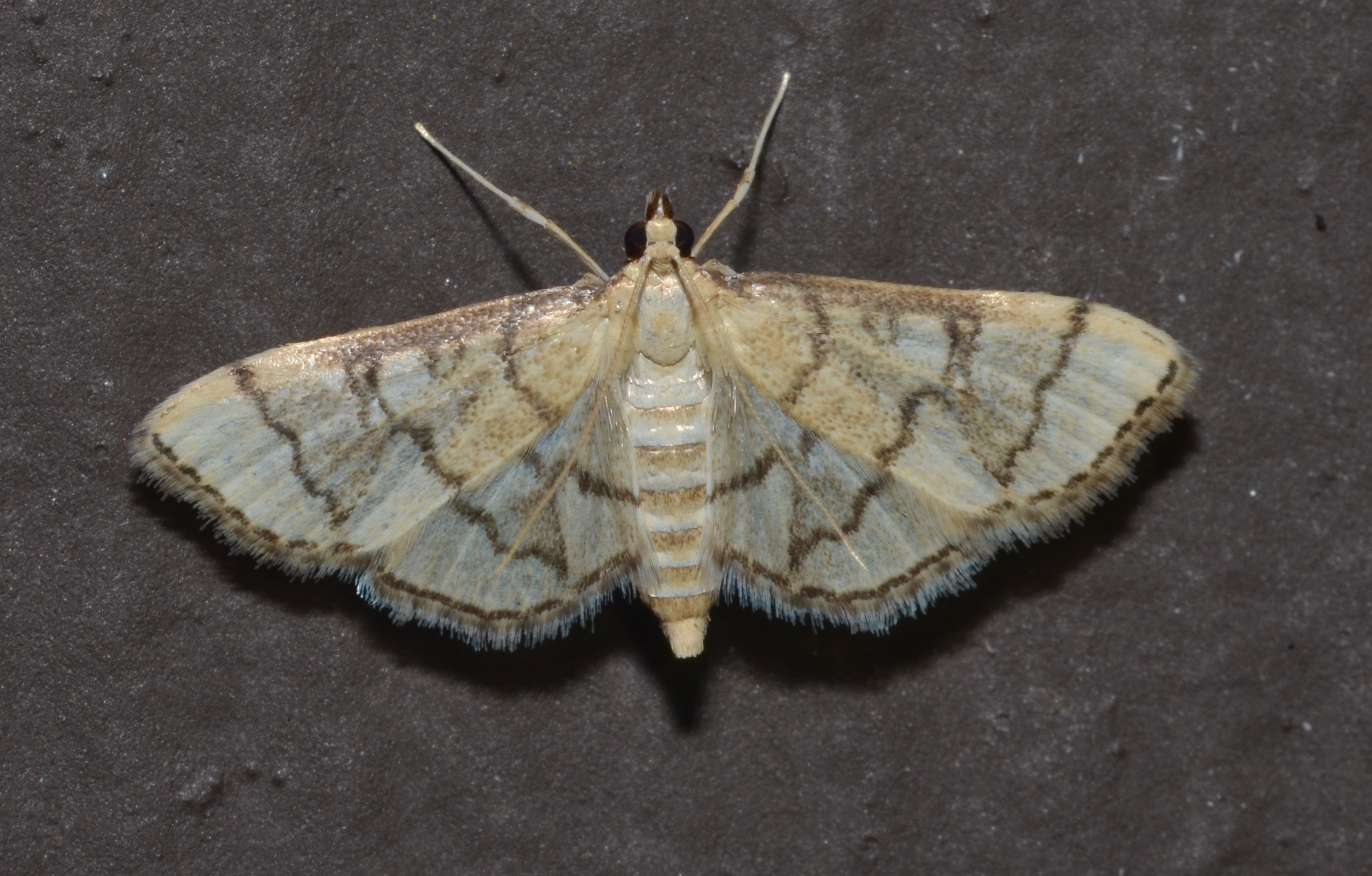

Scientific classification
- Kingdom: Animalia
- Phylum: Arthropoda
- Clade: Pancrustacea
- Class: Insecta
- Order: Lepidoptera
- Family: Crambidae
- Genus: Blepharomastix
- Species: B. ranalis

Binomial name
- Blepharomastix ranalis (Guenée, 1854)

Synonyms
- Stenia ranalis Guenée, 1854; Asopia archasialis Walker, 1859; Blepharomastix datisalis Druce, 1895; Blepharomastix occidentalis Haimbach, 1908; Botys gracilis Grote & Robinson, 1867; Botys ofellusalis Walker, 1859; Botys olliusalis Walker, 1859; Botys strictalis Walker, 1866

= Blepharomastix ranalis =

Species of moth

Blepharomastix ranalis, the hollow-spotted blepharomastix moth, is a species of grass moth of the family Crambidae found in the eastern and southern United States, and Mexico.

== Description ==
Adult wings are typically spread horizontally at rest, with the forewing spread further than the hindwing. Wings have a pale, tan ground color interrupted by dark brown antemedial, postmedial, and dashed terminal lines. The postmedial line of the forewing turns sharply toward the median area and again toward the inner margin. The median area of the forewing contains an orbicular spot and a reniform spot, each outlined in brown, giving them a hollow appearance.

== Distribution and habitat ==
The species' occurrence range extends from Arizona, Oklahoma, and Wisconsin in the west to Florida, New Hampshire, and Quebec in the east.

== Life cycle ==
Adults have been reported from March to October, with most sightings from April to August.
