= Blepharomastix benetinctalis =

Scientific classification
- Kingdom: Animalia
- Phylum: Arthropoda
- Clade: Pancrustacea
- Class: Insecta
- Order: Lepidoptera
- Family: Crambidae
- Genus: Blepharomastix
- Species: B. benetinctalis

Binomial name
- Blepharomastix benetinctalis (Dyar, 1914)

Synonyms
- Stenia benetinctalis Dyar, 1914

Species of moth

Blepharomastix benetinctalis is a species of moth in the family Crambidae. It was described by Harrison Gray Dyar Jr. in 1914. It is found in Tabasco, Mexico.

== Description ==
The wingspan is about 15 mm. The forewings are dirty white, shaded with brown from the costa downward and with blackish at the apex. The lines are blackish and there is a terminal row of small, well-separated dots. The hindwings are whitish with a small discal dot and a blackish patch at the apex. Adults have been recorded on wing in October.
