= Blepharomastix strigivenalis =

Scientific classification
- Kingdom: Animalia
- Phylum: Arthropoda
- Clade: Pancrustacea
- Class: Insecta
- Order: Lepidoptera
- Family: Crambidae
- Genus: Blepharomastix
- Species: B. strigivenalis

Binomial name
- Blepharomastix strigivenalis (Hampson, 1918)

Synonyms
- Lamprosema strigivenalis Hampson, 1918

Species of moth

Blepharomastix strigivenalis is a species of moth in the family Crambidae. It was described by George Hampson in 1918. It is found in Ecuador.

== Description ==
The wingspan is about 16 mm. The forewings are whitish suffused with ochreous. The costal edge is black towards the base and there is a black spot at the base of the cell, as well as a subbasal black spot on the inner margin. The antemedial line is blackish with a black spot at the costa. The hindwings are whitish, suffused with fuscous brown and with a blackish terminal line.
