= Blepharomastix hedychroalis =

Scientific classification
- Kingdom: Animalia
- Phylum: Arthropoda
- Clade: Pancrustacea
- Class: Insecta
- Order: Lepidoptera
- Family: Crambidae
- Genus: Blepharomastix
- Species: B. hedychroalis

Binomial name
- Blepharomastix hedychroalis C. Swinhoe, 1907

Synonyms
- Epipagis hedychroalis

Species of moth

Blepharomastix hedychroalis is a species of moth in the family Crambidae first described by Charles Swinhoe in 1907. It is found on the Andaman Islands in the Indian Ocean.
