= Blepharomastix griseicosta =

Scientific classification
- Kingdom: Animalia
- Phylum: Arthropoda
- Clade: Pancrustacea
- Class: Insecta
- Order: Lepidoptera
- Family: Crambidae
- Genus: Blepharomastix
- Species: B. griseicosta

Binomial name
- Blepharomastix griseicosta (Hampson, 1918)

Synonyms
- Lamprosema griseicosta Hampson, 1918

Species of moth

Blepharomastix griseicosta is a species of moth in the family Crambidae. It was described by George Hampson in 1918. It is found in Peru.

== Description ==
The wingspan is 26–28 mm. The forewings are silvery white with a grey-brown costal area and a faint brown antemedial line, as well as a curved dark brown discoidal striga. The postmedial line is grey brown with a blackish bar at the costa and there is a grey-brown terminal line. The hindwings are silvery white with a pale grey-brown postmedial line and a grey-brown terminal line, except towards the tornus.
