= Blepharomastix styxalis =

Scientific classification
- Kingdom: Animalia
- Phylum: Arthropoda
- Clade: Pancrustacea
- Class: Insecta
- Order: Lepidoptera
- Family: Crambidae
- Genus: Blepharomastix
- Species: B. styxalis

Binomial name
- Blepharomastix styxalis (Schaus, 1924)

Synonyms
- Stenia styxalis Schaus, 1924

Species of moth

Blepharomastix styxalis is a species of moth in the family Crambidae. It was described by William Schaus in 1924. It is found in French Guiana.

== Description ==
The wingspan is about 20 mm. The forewings and termen of the hindwings are suffused with brown. There are dark lines on the discocellulars, as well as a faint dark postmedial line.
