= Blepharomastix zethealis =

Scientific classification
- Kingdom: Animalia
- Phylum: Arthropoda
- Clade: Pancrustacea
- Class: Insecta
- Order: Lepidoptera
- Family: Crambidae
- Genus: Blepharomastix
- Species: B. zethealis

Binomial name
- Blepharomastix zethealis (Schaus, 1912)

Synonyms
- Nacoleia zethealis Schaus, 1912

Species of moth

Blepharomastix zethealis is a species of moth in the family Crambidae. It was described by Schaus in 1912. It is found in Costa Rica.
