= Blepharomastix monocamptalis =

Scientific classification
- Kingdom: Animalia
- Phylum: Arthropoda
- Clade: Pancrustacea
- Class: Insecta
- Order: Lepidoptera
- Family: Crambidae
- Genus: Blepharomastix
- Species: B. monocamptalis

Binomial name
- Blepharomastix monocamptalis (Hampson, 1918)

Synonyms
- Lamprosema monocamptalis Hampson, 1918

Species of moth

Blepharomastix monocamptalis is a species of moth in the family Crambidae. It was described by George Hampson in 1918. It is found in Colombia.

== Description ==
The moth's wingspan is 24–28 mm. The forewings are silvery white and are faintly tinged with pale red-brown and a pale red-brown costal area, but leaving the costal edge white on the medial area. The antemedial line is red-brown and there is a red-brown discoidal bar, as well as a red-brown postmedial line and a rather diffused red-brown terminal line. The hindwings are white, faintly tinged with pale red-brown and with a red-brown discoidal bar. The postmedial line is red-brown and there is a pale red-brown subterminal shade, as well as a fine red-brown terminal line.
