= Blepharomastix branealis =

Scientific classification
- Kingdom: Animalia
- Phylum: Arthropoda
- Clade: Pancrustacea
- Class: Insecta
- Order: Lepidoptera
- Family: Crambidae
- Genus: Blepharomastix
- Species: B. branealis

Binomial name
- Blepharomastix branealis (Schaus, 1924)

Synonyms
- Stenia branealis Schaus, 1924

Species of moth

Blepharomastix branealis is a species of moth in the family Crambidae. It was described by William Schaus in 1924. It is found in Jamaica.

== Description ==
The wingspan is about 17 mm. There is a subbasal black point on the inner margin of the forewings. The antemedial line is black and there are two black lines at the discocellular. The terminal points are black. There is a fine black medial line on the hindwings.
