= Blepharomastix cronanalis =

Scientific classification
- Kingdom: Animalia
- Phylum: Arthropoda
- Clade: Pancrustacea
- Class: Insecta
- Order: Lepidoptera
- Family: Crambidae
- Genus: Blepharomastix
- Species: B. cronanalis

Binomial name
- Blepharomastix cronanalis (Schaus, 1924)

Synonyms
- Stenia cronanalis Schaus, 1924

Species of moth

Blepharomastix cronanalis is a species of moth in the family Crambidae. It was described by William Schaus in 1924. It is found in Peru.

== Description ==
The wingspan is about 22 mm. The wings are white with terminal fuscous-black points. The lines are fine and buffy brown. The forewing costal margin is suffused with buffy brown and there is an outcurved antemedial line followed by a broken ocellus in the cell at the subcosta. There is a line on the discocellular of the hindwings.
