= Blepharomastix potentalis =

Scientific classification
- Kingdom: Animalia
- Phylum: Arthropoda
- Clade: Pancrustacea
- Class: Insecta
- Order: Lepidoptera
- Family: Crambidae
- Genus: Blepharomastix
- Species: B. potentalis

Binomial name
- Blepharomastix potentalis (Barnes & McDunnough, 1914)

Synonyms
- Pyrausta potentalis Barnes & McDunnough, 1914

Species of moth

Blepharomastix potentalis is a species of moth in the family Crambidae first described by William Barnes and James Halliday McDunnough in 1914. It is found in North America, where it has been recorded from Arizona.

== Description ==
The wingspan is about 19 mm. The forewings are whitish, sprinkled lightly with brown scaling. The hindwings are similar in color, but rather whiter towards the base and with a dark subterminal line.
