= Blepharomastix aguirrealis =

Scientific classification
- Kingdom: Animalia
- Phylum: Arthropoda
- Clade: Pancrustacea
- Class: Insecta
- Order: Lepidoptera
- Family: Crambidae
- Genus: Blepharomastix
- Species: B. aguirrealis

Binomial name
- Blepharomastix aguirrealis (Schaus, 1940)

Synonyms
- Stenia aguirrealis Schaus, 1940

Species of moth

Blepharomastix aguirrealis is a species of moth in the family Crambidae. It was described by Schaus in 1940. It is found in Puerto Rico.
