= Blepharomastix veritalis =

Scientific classification
- Kingdom: Animalia
- Phylum: Arthropoda
- Clade: Pancrustacea
- Class: Insecta
- Order: Lepidoptera
- Family: Crambidae
- Genus: Blepharomastix
- Species: B. veritalis

Binomial name
- Blepharomastix veritalis (Dyar, 1914)

Synonyms
- Nacoleia veritalis Dyar, 1914; Lamprosema veritalis; Nacoleia veritas Dyar, 1914

Species of moth

Blepharomastix veritalis is a species of moth in the family Crambidae. It was described by Harrison Gray Dyar Jr. in 1914. It is found in Panama.

== Description ==
The wingspan is about 15 millimetres (0.59 in). The wings are white with a slight bronzy tint and with blackish lines.
