= Blepharomastix ineffectalis =

Scientific classification
- Kingdom: Animalia
- Phylum: Arthropoda
- Clade: Pancrustacea
- Class: Insecta
- Order: Lepidoptera
- Family: Crambidae
- Genus: Blepharomastix
- Species: B. ineffectalis

Binomial name
- Blepharomastix ineffectalis (Walker, 1862)

Synonyms
- Botys ineffectalis Walker, 1862

Species of moth

Blepharomastix ineffectalis is a species of moth in the family Crambidae. It was described by Francis Walker in 1862. It is found in Brazil.

== Description ==
The wings are white, with fawn-colored basal, interior and exterior lines. The forewings are brownish on the costa and a slight fawn-colored tinge along the exterior border. The marginal points are brown.
