= Blepharomastix leuconephralis =

Scientific classification
- Kingdom: Animalia
- Phylum: Arthropoda
- Clade: Pancrustacea
- Class: Insecta
- Order: Lepidoptera
- Family: Crambidae
- Genus: Blepharomastix
- Species: B. leuconephralis

Binomial name
- Blepharomastix leuconephralis (Hampson, 1918)

Synonyms
- Lamprosema leuconephralis Hampson, 1918

Species of moth

Blepharomastix leuconephralis is a species of moth in the family Crambidae. It was described by George Hampson in 1918. It is found in Colombia.

== Description ==
The wingspan is about 20 mm. The forewings are silvery white, with a pale red-brown costal area. The antemedial line is pale red-brown and there is a small pale red-brown annulus in upper part of the middle of the cell. The reniform is white, defined by pale red-brown and the postmedial line is also pale red-brown. There is a diffused very pale red-brown patch on the terminal area below apex, then a very pale red-brown terminal line. The hindwings are silvery white with a faint pale red-brown discoidal bar. The postmedial line is pale red-brown.
