= Blepharomastix primolalis =

Scientific classification
- Kingdom: Animalia
- Phylum: Arthropoda
- Clade: Pancrustacea
- Class: Insecta
- Order: Lepidoptera
- Family: Crambidae
- Genus: Blepharomastix
- Species: B. primolalis

Binomial name
- Blepharomastix primolalis (Schaus, 1924)

Synonyms
- Stenia primolalis Schaus, 1924

Species of moth

Blepharomastix primolalis is a species of moth in the family Crambidae. It was described by William Schaus in 1924. It is found in Suriname.

== Description ==
The wingspan is about 14 mm. The wings are white with honey-yellow markings. The basal half of the costa of the forewings is honey yellow.
