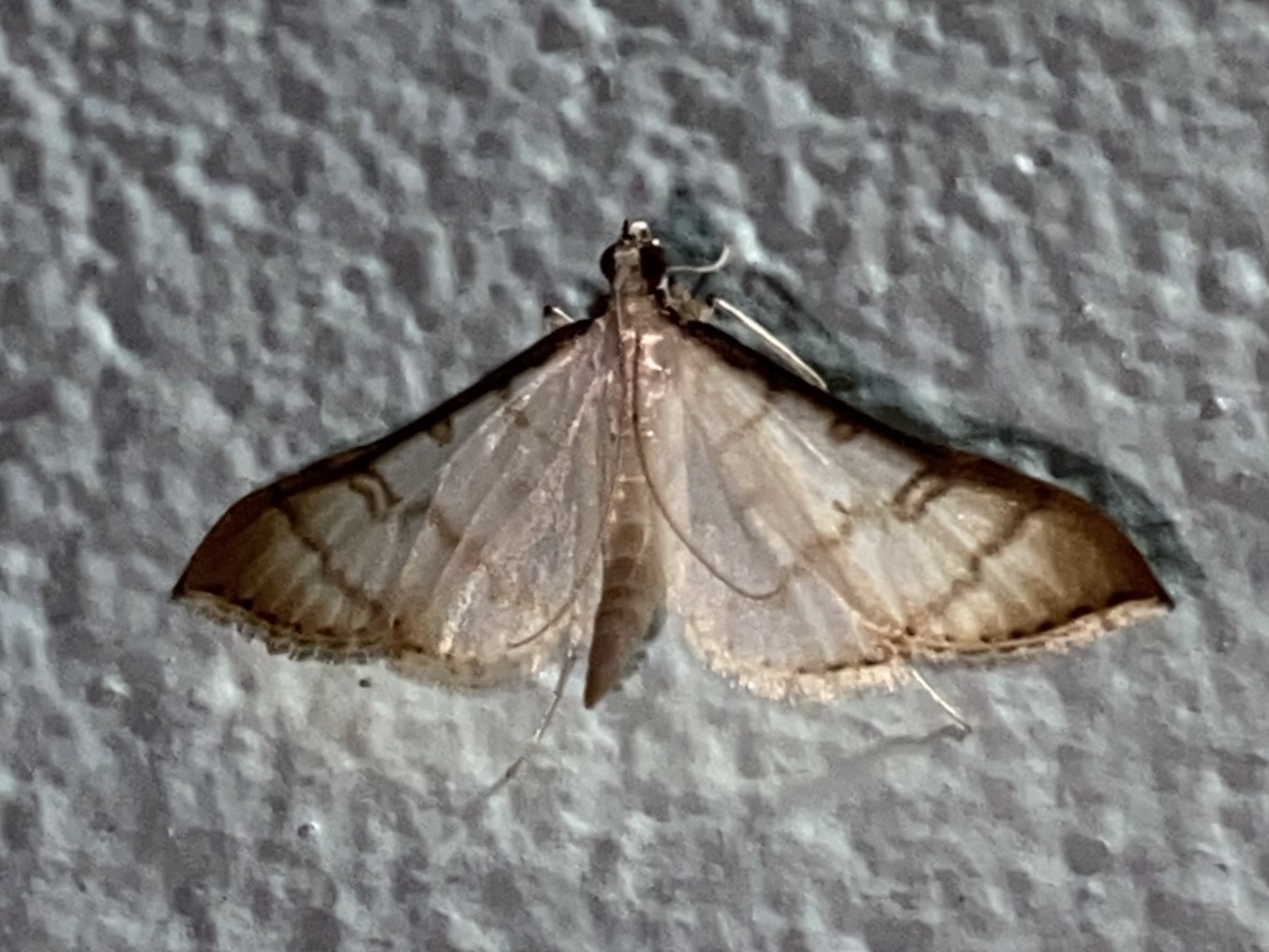

Scientific classification
- Kingdom: Animalia
- Phylum: Arthropoda
- Clade: Pancrustacea
- Class: Insecta
- Order: Lepidoptera
- Family: Crambidae
- Genus: Blepharomastix
- Species: B. colubralis

Binomial name
- Blepharomastix colubralis (Guenée, 1854)

Synonyms
- Stenia colubralis Guenée, 1854; Botys electralis Walker, 1859

= Blepharomastix colubralis =

Species of moth

Blepharomastix colubralis is a species of moth in the family Crambidae. It was described by Achille Guenée in 1854. It is found in French Guiana and Tefé, Brazil.
