= Blepharomastix haedulalis =

Scientific classification
- Kingdom: Animalia
- Phylum: Arthropoda
- Clade: Pancrustacea
- Class: Insecta
- Order: Lepidoptera
- Family: Crambidae
- Genus: Blepharomastix
- Species: B. haedulalis

Binomial name
- Blepharomastix haedulalis (Hulst, 1886)

Synonyms
- Botis haedulalis Hulst, 1886; Nomophila astigmalis Hampson, 1899; Nomophila irregulalis Dyar, 1913; Nomophila irregularis Klima, 1939

Species of moth

Blepharomastix haedulalis is a species of moth in the family Crambidae. It is found in Mexico and southern Texas.

== Description ==
The wingspan is about 27 mm. The forewings are powdery grey, with a somewhat carneous underground, shaded darker along the costa. The inner line is blackish and the terminal line is slender and black. The hindwings are silky whitish, with faint carneous tint.
