= Blepharomastix apertisigna =

Scientific classification
- Kingdom: Animalia
- Phylum: Arthropoda
- Clade: Pancrustacea
- Class: Insecta
- Order: Lepidoptera
- Family: Crambidae
- Genus: Blepharomastix
- Species: B. apertisigna

Binomial name
- Blepharomastix apertisigna (Hampson, 1912)

Synonyms
- Nacoleia apertisigna Hampson, 1912; Blepharomastix terricolalis Druce, 1895

Species of moth

Blepharomastix apertisigna is a species of moth in the family Crambidae, described by George Hampson in 1912, from Xalapa, Mexico.
