= Blepharomastix costalis =

Scientific classification
- Kingdom: Animalia
- Phylum: Arthropoda
- Clade: Pancrustacea
- Class: Insecta
- Order: Lepidoptera
- Family: Crambidae
- Genus: Blepharomastix
- Species: B. costalis

Binomial name
- Blepharomastix costalis (Walker, 1866)

Synonyms
- Sozoa costalis Walker, 1866

Species of moth

Blepharomastix costalis is a species of moth in the family Crambidae. It was described by Francis Walker in 1866. It is found in Venezuela.
