= Blepharomastix melitealis =

Scientific classification
- Kingdom: Animalia
- Phylum: Arthropoda
- Clade: Pancrustacea
- Class: Insecta
- Order: Lepidoptera
- Family: Crambidae
- Genus: Blepharomastix
- Species: B. melitealis

Binomial name
- Blepharomastix melitealis (Walker, 1859)

Synonyms
- Botys melitealis Walker, 1859

Species of moth

Blepharomastix melitealis is a species of moth in the family Crambidae. It was described by Francis Walker in 1859. It is found in Brazil.
