= Blepharomastix sabulosa =

Scientific classification
- Kingdom: Animalia
- Phylum: Arthropoda
- Clade: Pancrustacea
- Class: Insecta
- Order: Lepidoptera
- Family: Crambidae
- Genus: Blepharomastix
- Species: B. sabulosa

Binomial name
- Blepharomastix sabulosa (Hampson, 1913)

Synonyms
- Pyrausta sabulosa Hampson, 1913

Species of moth

Blepharomastix sabulosa is a species of moth in the family Crambidae. It is found in Mexico.
