= Blepharomastix biannulalis =

Scientific classification
- Kingdom: Animalia
- Phylum: Arthropoda
- Clade: Pancrustacea
- Class: Insecta
- Order: Lepidoptera
- Family: Crambidae
- Genus: Blepharomastix
- Species: B. biannulalis

Binomial name
- Blepharomastix biannulalis (Hampson, 1907)

Synonyms
- Stenia biannulalis Hampson, 1907

Species of moth

Blepharomastix biannulalis is a species of moth in the family Crambidae. It was described by George Hampson in 1907. It is found in Brazil.
