= Blepharomastix gigantalis =

Scientific classification
- Kingdom: Animalia
- Phylum: Arthropoda
- Clade: Pancrustacea
- Class: Insecta
- Order: Lepidoptera
- Family: Crambidae
- Genus: Blepharomastix
- Species: B. gigantalis

Binomial name
- Blepharomastix gigantalis H. Druce, 1895

Species of moth

Blepharomastix gigantalis is a species of moth in the family Crambidae. It was described by Herbert Druce in 1895. It is found in Guatemala.
