= Blepharomastix inflexalis =

Scientific classification
- Kingdom: Animalia
- Phylum: Arthropoda
- Clade: Pancrustacea
- Class: Insecta
- Order: Lepidoptera
- Family: Crambidae
- Genus: Blepharomastix
- Species: B. inflexalis

Binomial name
- Blepharomastix inflexalis (Hampson, 1912)

Synonyms
- Nacoleia inflexalis Hampson, 1912; Blepharomastix colubralis Druce, 1895

Species of moth

Blepharomastix inflexalis is a species of moth in the family Crambidae. It was described by George Hampson in 1912. It is found in Guerrero, Mexico.
