= Blepharomastix dadalis =

Scientific classification
- Kingdom: Animalia
- Phylum: Arthropoda
- Clade: Pancrustacea
- Class: Insecta
- Order: Lepidoptera
- Family: Crambidae
- Genus: Blepharomastix
- Species: B. dadalis

Binomial name
- Blepharomastix dadalis (H. Druce, 1895)

Synonyms
- Epichronistis dadalis H. Druce, 1895

Species of moth

Blepharomastix dadalis is a species of moth in the family Crambidae. It was described by Herbert Druce in 1895. It is found in Costa Rica and Panama.

== Description ==
The forewings and hindwings are silky white. The forewings with the costal margin, apex, and outer margin are shaded with dusky brown. There is a small spot in the cell and another at the end of it, as well as a submarginal pale brown waved line. The hindwings are crossed by a waved brown line below the middle and the apex is bordered with dusky brown.
