= Blepharomastix marialis =

Scientific classification
- Kingdom: Animalia
- Phylum: Arthropoda
- Clade: Pancrustacea
- Class: Insecta
- Order: Lepidoptera
- Family: Crambidae
- Genus: Blepharomastix
- Species: B. marialis

Binomial name
- Blepharomastix marialis (Schaus, 1924)

Synonyms
- Stenia marialis Schaus, 1924

Species of moth

Blepharomastix marialis is a species of moth in the family Crambidae. It was described by William Schaus in 1924. It is found in Guatemala.

== Description ==
The wingspan is about 20 mm. The forewings are drab with darker markings. The hindwings are white, thinly scaled and the termen suffused with drab. There is a brown postmedial wavy line.
