= Blepharomastix rufilinealis =

Scientific classification
- Kingdom: Animalia
- Phylum: Arthropoda
- Clade: Pancrustacea
- Class: Insecta
- Order: Lepidoptera
- Family: Crambidae
- Genus: Blepharomastix
- Species: B. rufilinealis

Binomial name
- Blepharomastix rufilinealis (Hampson, 1918)

Synonyms
- Lamprosema rufilinealis Hampson, 1918

Species of moth

Blepharomastix rufilinealis is a species of moth in the family Crambidae. It was described by George Hampson in 1918. It is found in Ecuador and in Venezuela (Bolívar).
