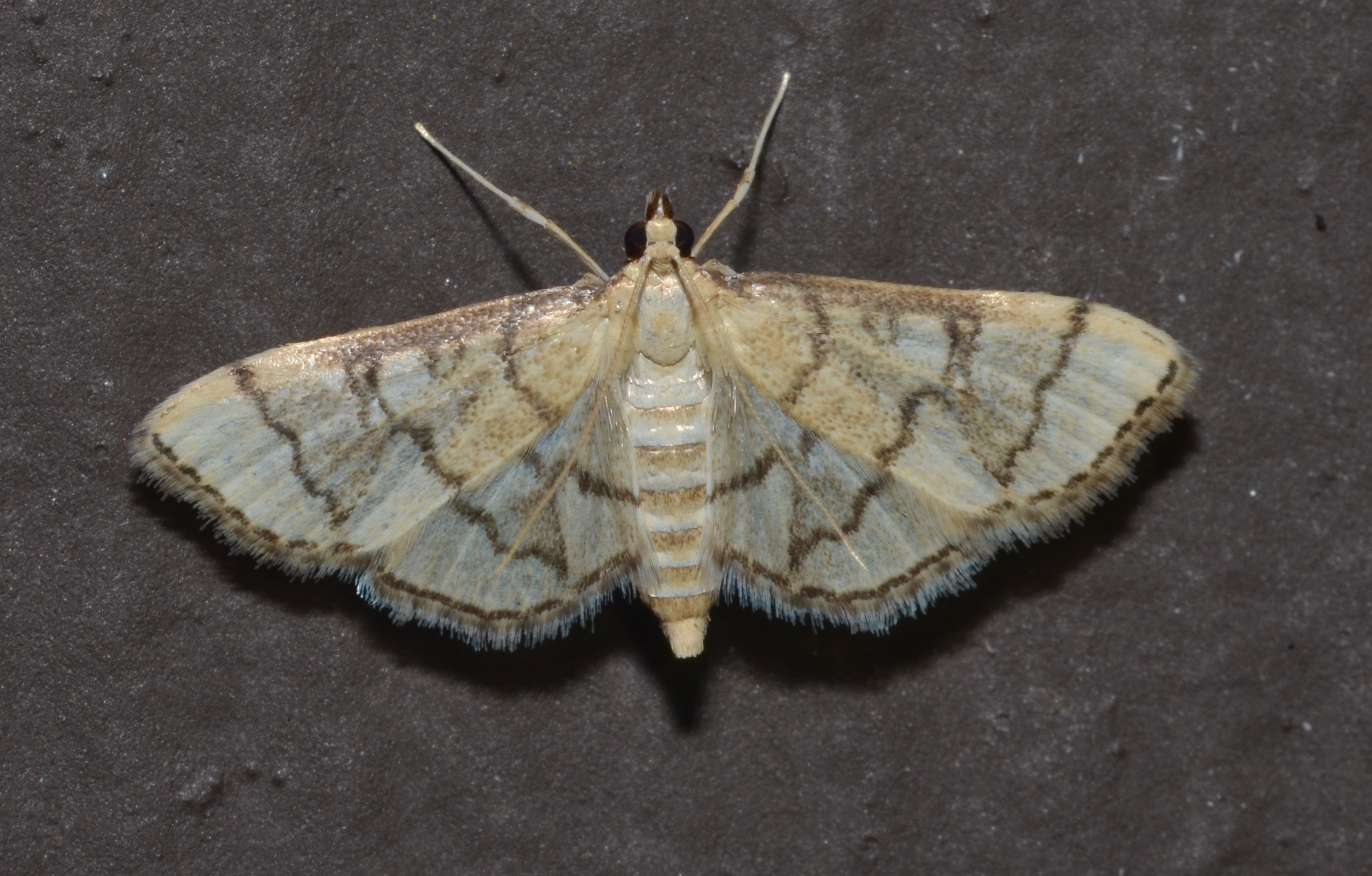
- Blepharomastix ranalis

Scientific classification
- Kingdom: Animalia
- Phylum: Arthropoda
- Clade: Pancrustacea
- Class: Insecta
- Order: Lepidoptera
- Family: Crambidae
- Subfamily: Spilomelinae
- Tribe: Herpetogrammatini
- Genus: Blepharomastix; Lederer, 1863

Synonyms
- Ichthyoptila Meyrick, 1936; Sozoa Walker, 1866

= Blepharomastix =

Genus of moths

Blepharomastix is a genus of moths of the family Crambidae described by Julius Lederer in 1863.

== Species ==
- Blepharomastix achroalis (Hampson, 1913)
- Blepharomastix adustalis (C. Felder, R. Felder & Rogenhofer, 1875)
- Blepharomastix aguirrealis (Schaus, 1940)
- Blepharomastix apertisigna (Hampson, 1912)
- Blepharomastix aphenice (Hampson, 1907)
- Blepharomastix astenialis (Dyar, 1922)
- Blepharomastix bademusalis (Schaus, 1924)
- Blepharomastix batracalis (Guenée, 1854)
- Blepharomastix benetinctalis (Dyar, 1914)
- Blepharomastix beuvealis (Schaus, 1924)
- Blepharomastix biannulalis (Hampson, 1907)
- Blepharomastix branealis (Schaus, 1924)
- Blepharomastix caclamalis (Schaus, 1924)
- Blepharomastix carillalis (Schaus, 1912)
- Blepharomastix carthaghalis (Schaus, 1924)
- Blepharomastix caulealis (Schaus, 1924)
- Blepharomastix cayugalis (Schaus, 1924)
- Blepharomastix cirrosalis (C. Felder, R. Felder & Rogenhofer, 1875)
- Blepharomastix coatepecensis Druce, 1895
- Blepharomastix coeneusalis (Walker, 1859)
- Blepharomastix colubralis (Guenée, 1854)
- Blepharomastix costaliparilis Munroe, 1995
- Blepharomastix costalis (Walker, 1866)
- Blepharomastix cronanalis (Schaus, 1924)
- Blepharomastix crusalis Druce, 1895
- Blepharomastix cylonalis (Druce, 1895)
- Blepharomastix dadalis (Druce, 1895)
- Blepharomastix diaphanalis (Schaus, 1920)
- Blepharomastix eborinalis Snellen, 1899
- Blepharomastix epistenialis (Klima, 1939)
- Blepharomastix fusalis (Hampson, 1917)
- Blepharomastix fuscilunalis (Hampson, 1907)
- Blepharomastix garzettalis (C. Felder, R. Felder & Rogenhofer, 1875)
- Blepharomastix gigantalis Druce, 1895
- Blepharomastix glaucinalis (Hampson, 1917)
- Blepharomastix glaucoleuca (Hampson, 1913)
- Blepharomastix griseicosta (Hampson, 1918)
- Blepharomastix guianalis (Schaus, 1924)
- Blepharomastix haedulalis (Hulst, 1886)
- Blepharomastix hedychroalis Swinhoe, 1907
- Blepharomastix herreralis (Schaus, 1924)
- Blepharomastix hydrothionalis (Snellen, 1875)
- Blepharomastix hyperochalis (Dyar, 1914)
- Blepharomastix ianthealis (Walker, 1859)
- Blepharomastix indentata (Hampson, 1912)
- Blepharomastix ineffectalis (Walker, 1862)
- Blepharomastix inflexalis (Hampson, 1912)
- Blepharomastix interruptalis (Hampson, 1907)
- Blepharomastix irroratalis (Hampson, 1907)
- Blepharomastix lacertalis (Guenée, 1854)
- Blepharomastix leuconephralis (Hampson, 1918)
- Blepharomastix leucophaea (Hampson, 1912)
- Blepharomastix marialis (Schaus, 1924)
- Blepharomastix melitealis (Walker, 1859)
- Blepharomastix monocamptalis (Hampson, 1918)
- Blepharomastix mononalis (Dyar, 1918)
- Blepharomastix obscura (Warren, 1889)
- Blepharomastix obscuralis Snellen, 1899
- Blepharomastix pacificalis (Schaus, 1912)
- Blepharomastix pallidipennis (Warren, 1889)
- Blepharomastix paracausta Meyrick, 1934
- Blepharomastix poasalis (Schaus, 1912)
- Blepharomastix potentalis (Barnes & McDunnough, 1914)
- Blepharomastix primolalis (Schaus, 1924)
- Blepharomastix prophaealis (Dognin, 1913)
- Blepharomastix pseudoranalis (Barnes & McDunnough, 1914)
- Blepharomastix pulverulalis Druce, 1895
- Blepharomastix ranalis (Guenée, 1854)
- Blepharomastix randalis (Druce, 1895)
- Blepharomastix rufilinealis (Hampson, 1918)
- Blepharomastix sabulosa (Hampson, 1913)
- Blepharomastix saponalis (Guenée, 1854)
- Blepharomastix saurialis (Guenée, 1854)
- Blepharomastix schistisemalis (Hampson, 1912)
- Blepharomastix semifuscalis (Hampson, 1907)
- Blepharomastix stenialis (Dyar, 1914)
- Blepharomastix stenothyris (Meyrick, 1936)
- Blepharomastix strigivenalis (Hampson, 1918)
- Blepharomastix styxalis (Schaus, 1924)
- Blepharomastix turiafalis (Schaus, 1924)
- Blepharomastix veritalis (Dyar, 1914)
- Blepharomastix vestalialis Snellen, 1875
- Blepharomastix vilialis (Guenée, 1854)
- Blepharomastix zethealis (Schaus, 1912)
