= Blepharomastix poasalis =

Scientific classification
- Kingdom: Animalia
- Phylum: Arthropoda
- Clade: Pancrustacea
- Class: Insecta
- Order: Lepidoptera
- Family: Crambidae
- Genus: Blepharomastix
- Species: B. poasalis

Binomial name
- Blepharomastix poasalis (Schaus, 1912)

Synonyms
- Stenia poasalis Schaus, 1912

Species of moth

Blepharomastix poasalis is a species of moth in the family Crambidae. It was described by Schaus in 1912. It is found in Costa Rica.
