= Blepharomastix cylonalis =

Scientific classification
- Kingdom: Animalia
- Phylum: Arthropoda
- Clade: Pancrustacea
- Class: Insecta
- Order: Lepidoptera
- Family: Crambidae
- Genus: Blepharomastix
- Species: B. cylonalis

Binomial name
- Blepharomastix cylonalis (H. Druce, 1895)

Synonyms
- Epichronistis cylonalis H. Druce, 1895

Species of moth

Blepharomastix cylonalis is a species of moth in the family Crambidae. It was described by Herbert Druce in 1895. It is found in Guatemala and Panama.

== Description ==
The forewings and hindwings are creamy yellow. The forewings are crossed by three and the hindwings by two fine wavy brown lines. The marginal line is brown.
