= Blepharomastix obscuralis =

Scientific classification
- Kingdom: Animalia
- Phylum: Arthropoda
- Clade: Pancrustacea
- Class: Insecta
- Order: Lepidoptera
- Family: Crambidae
- Genus: Blepharomastix
- Species: B. obscuralis

Binomial name
- Blepharomastix obscuralis Snellen, 1899

Species of moth

Blepharomastix obscuralis is a species of moth in the family Crambidae. It is found in Panama.
