= Blepharomastix coatepecensis =

Scientific classification
- Kingdom: Animalia
- Phylum: Arthropoda
- Clade: Pancrustacea
- Class: Insecta
- Order: Lepidoptera
- Family: Crambidae
- Genus: Blepharomastix
- Species: B. coatepecensis

Binomial name
- Blepharomastix coatepecensis H. Druce, 1895

Species of moth

Blepharomastix coatepecensis is a species of moth in the family Crambidae. It was described by Herbert Druce in 1895. It is known from Coatepec, Mexico.

== Description ==
The forewings and hindwings are pale brownish white. The former crossed by three waved brown lines from the costal to the inner margin. The hindwings are crossed by two waved brown lines. The marginal line is dark brown. The wingspan is 19 mm (3/4 in).
