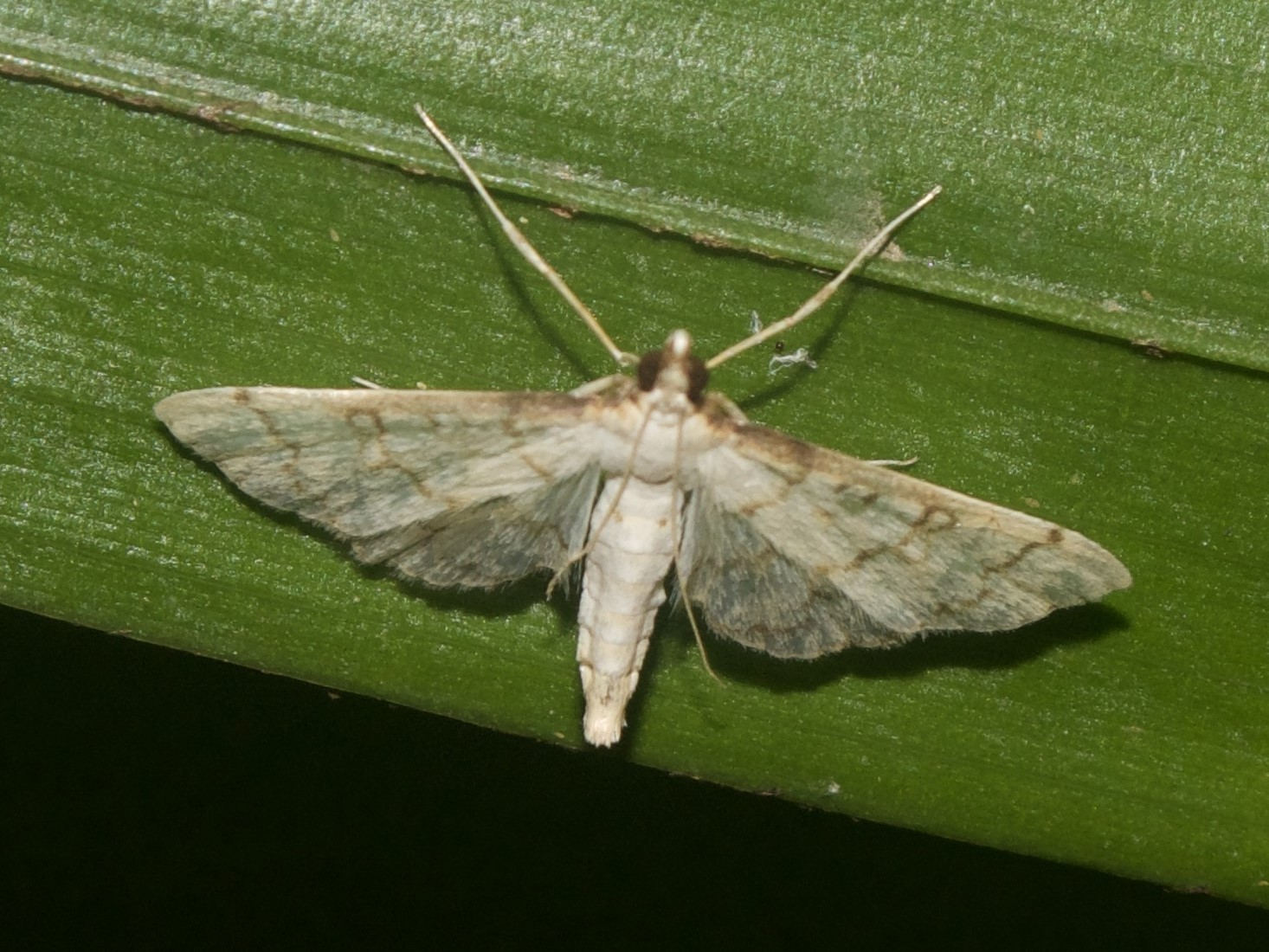

Scientific classification
- Kingdom: Animalia
- Phylum: Arthropoda
- Clade: Pancrustacea
- Class: Insecta
- Order: Lepidoptera
- Family: Crambidae
- Genus: Blepharomastix
- Species: B. saponalis

Binomial name
- Blepharomastix saponalis (Guenée, 1854)

Synonyms
- Stenia saponalis Guenée, 1854

= Blepharomastix saponalis =

Species of moth

Blepharomastix saponalis is a species of moth in the family Crambidae. It was first described by Achille Guenée in 1854. It is endemic to French Guiana.
