= Blepharomastix bademusalis =

Scientific classification
- Kingdom: Animalia
- Phylum: Arthropoda
- Clade: Pancrustacea
- Class: Insecta
- Order: Lepidoptera
- Family: Crambidae
- Genus: Blepharomastix
- Species: B. bademusalis

Binomial name
- Blepharomastix bademusalis (Schaus, 1924)

Synonyms
- Stenia bademusalis Schaus, 1924

Species of moth

Blepharomastix bademusalis is a species of moth in the family Crambidae. It was described by William Schaus in 1924. It is found in Peru.

== Description ==
The wingspan is about 23 mm. The forewings are white, the costa suffused with buffy brown. There is a faint buffy-brown spot in the cell. The postmedial line is faint and buffy brown and there are brown terminal points. The hindwings are white with a faint postmedial line, as well as an interrupted sayal (the color of sackcloth) -brown terminal line.
