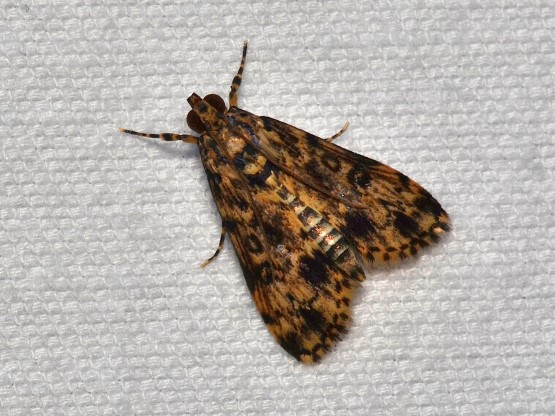

Scientific classification
- Kingdom: Animalia
- Phylum: Arthropoda
- Clade: Pancrustacea
- Class: Insecta
- Order: Lepidoptera
- Family: Crambidae
- Genus: Blepharomastix
- Species: B. schistisemalis

Binomial name
- Blepharomastix schistisemalis (Hampson, 1912)

Synonyms
- Nacoleia schistisemalis Hampson, 1912

= Blepharomastix schistisemalis =

Species of moth

Blepharomastix schistisemalis is a species of moth in the family Crambidae. It was described by George Hampson in 1912. It is found from Florida, to the Bahamas and Cuba through Central America (including Panama) to South America, south to Argentina.
