= Blepharomastix prophaealis =

Scientific classification
- Kingdom: Animalia
- Phylum: Arthropoda
- Clade: Pancrustacea
- Class: Insecta
- Order: Lepidoptera
- Family: Crambidae
- Genus: Blepharomastix
- Species: B. prophaealis

Binomial name
- Blepharomastix prophaealis (Dognin, 1913)

Synonyms
- Stenia prophaealis Dognin, 1913

Species of moth

Blepharomastix prophaealis is a species of moth in the family Crambidae. It is found in Peru.
