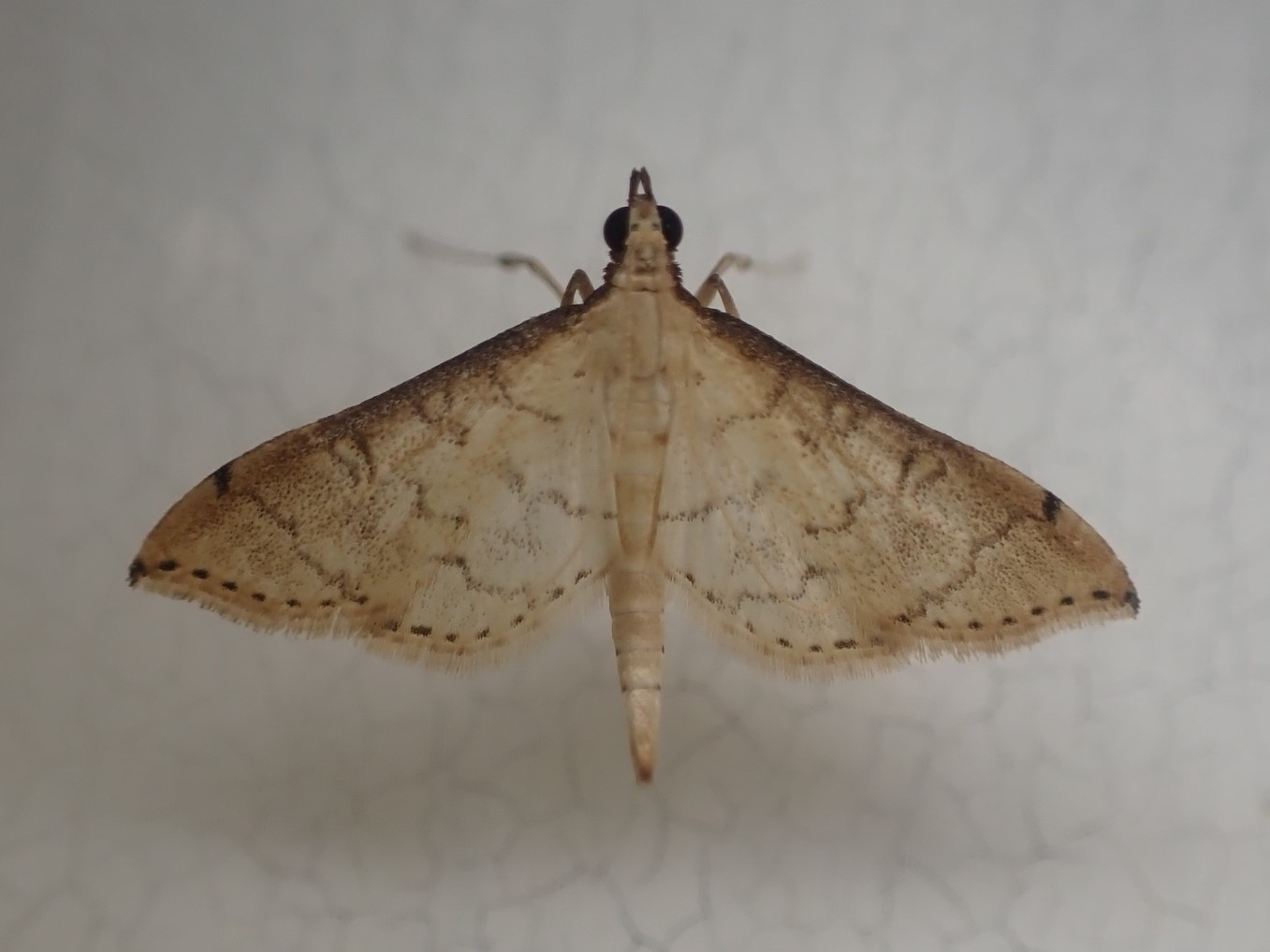

Scientific classification
- Kingdom: Animalia
- Phylum: Arthropoda
- Clade: Pancrustacea
- Class: Insecta
- Order: Lepidoptera
- Family: Crambidae
- Genus: Blepharomastix
- Species: B. lacertalis

Binomial name
- Blepharomastix lacertalis (Guenée, 1854)

Synonyms
- Stenia lacertalis Guenée, 1854

= Blepharomastix lacertalis =

Species of moth

Blepharomastix lacertalis is a species of moth in the family Crambidae. It was described by Achille Guenée in 1854. It is found in Brazil.
