= Blepharomastix astenialis =

Scientific classification
- Kingdom: Animalia
- Phylum: Arthropoda
- Clade: Pancrustacea
- Class: Insecta
- Order: Lepidoptera
- Family: Crambidae
- Genus: Blepharomastix
- Species: B. astenialis

Binomial name
- Blepharomastix astenialis (Dyar, 1922)

Synonyms
- Stenia astenialis Dyar, 1922

Species of moth

Blepharomastix astenialis is a species of moth in the family Crambidae. It was described by Harrison Gray Dyar Jr. in 1922. It is found in Mexico.
