= Blepharomastix pallidipennis =

Scientific classification
- Kingdom: Animalia
- Phylum: Arthropoda
- Clade: Pancrustacea
- Class: Insecta
- Order: Lepidoptera
- Family: Crambidae
- Genus: Blepharomastix
- Species: B. pallidipennis

Binomial name
- Blepharomastix pallidipennis (Warren, 1889)

Synonyms
- Hapalia pallidipennis Warren, 1889

Species of moth

Blepharomastix pallidipennis is a species of moth in the family Crambidae. It is found in Brazil.

== Description ==
The wingspan is about 25 mm. The forewings are semihyaline whitish with a faint yellowish tinge. The costa and hind margin are diffusely bronzy grey with brownish lines. There is a very strong brown lunular mark on the discocellular, and a minute dot immediately beyond the first line. The hindwings are bronzy grey along the hind margin, with a distinct central brown spot and the exterior line of the forewings is repeated.
