= Blepharomastix irroratalis =

Scientific classification
- Kingdom: Animalia
- Phylum: Arthropoda
- Clade: Pancrustacea
- Class: Insecta
- Order: Lepidoptera
- Family: Crambidae
- Genus: Blepharomastix
- Species: B. irroratalis

Binomial name
- Blepharomastix irroratalis (Hampson, 1907)

Synonyms
- Stenia irroratalis Hampson, 1907

Species of moth

Blepharomastix irroratalis is a species of moth in the family Crambidae. It was described by George Hampson in 1907. It is found in Guatemala.

== Description ==
The forewings are whitish, tinged and irrorated (speckled) with yellow brown, the costal area and terminal area suffused with brown. There are traces of a dark antemedial line and there is a slight dark discoidal lunule, as well as a faint, dark, postmedial, minutely waved line. There is a terminal series of slight dark points. The hindwings are tinged with ochreous and there is a faint dark discoidal lunule, as well as traces of a postmedial line and some slight dark points on the termen towards the apex.
