= Blepharomastix cayugalis =

Scientific classification
- Kingdom: Animalia
- Phylum: Arthropoda
- Clade: Pancrustacea
- Class: Insecta
- Order: Lepidoptera
- Family: Crambidae
- Genus: Blepharomastix
- Species: B. cayugalis

Binomial name
- Blepharomastix cayugalis (Schaus, 1924)

Synonyms
- Stenia cayugalis Schaus, 1924

Species of moth

Blepharomastix cayugalis is a species of moth in the family Crambidae. It was described by William Schaus in 1924. It is found in Guatemala.

== Description ==
The wingspan is about 14 mm. The wings are chamoisee colour with fuscous markings, the lines consisting of fine diffused scales. The basal half of the costa of the forewings has dark irrorations (speckles). The hindwings have a sinuous medial line, a wavy postmedial line to the termen at the submedian fold and a terminal line.
