= Blepharomastix coeneusalis =

Scientific classification
- Kingdom: Animalia
- Phylum: Arthropoda
- Clade: Pancrustacea
- Class: Insecta
- Order: Lepidoptera
- Family: Crambidae
- Genus: Blepharomastix
- Species: B. coeneusalis

Binomial name
- Blepharomastix coeneusalis (Walker, 1859)

Synonyms
- Botys coeneusalis Walker, 1859

Species of moth

Blepharomastix coeneusalis is a species of moth in the family Crambidae. It was described by Francis Walker in 1859. It is found in Honduras.
