= Blepharomastix beuvealis =

Scientific classification
- Kingdom: Animalia
- Phylum: Arthropoda
- Clade: Pancrustacea
- Class: Insecta
- Order: Lepidoptera
- Family: Crambidae
- Genus: Blepharomastix
- Species: B. beuvealis

Binomial name
- Blepharomastix beuvealis (Schaus, 1924)

Synonyms
- Stenia beuvealis Schaus, 1924

Species of moth

Blepharomastix beuvealis is a species of moth in the family Crambidae. It was described by William Schaus in 1924. It is found in French Guiana.

== Description ==
The wingspan is about 18 mm. The forewings are white suffused with cream buff. The costa is fuscous to beyond the middle and the antemedial line is cinnamon drab and followed by a fuscous spot at the subcostal area. The postmedial line is black on the costa and cinnamon drab below it. There are fuscous terminal points. The hindwings are white, suffused with cream buff beyond the cell to the apex and there is a fine postmedial wavy line from the costa to the termen, as well as a fine and faint terminal line.
