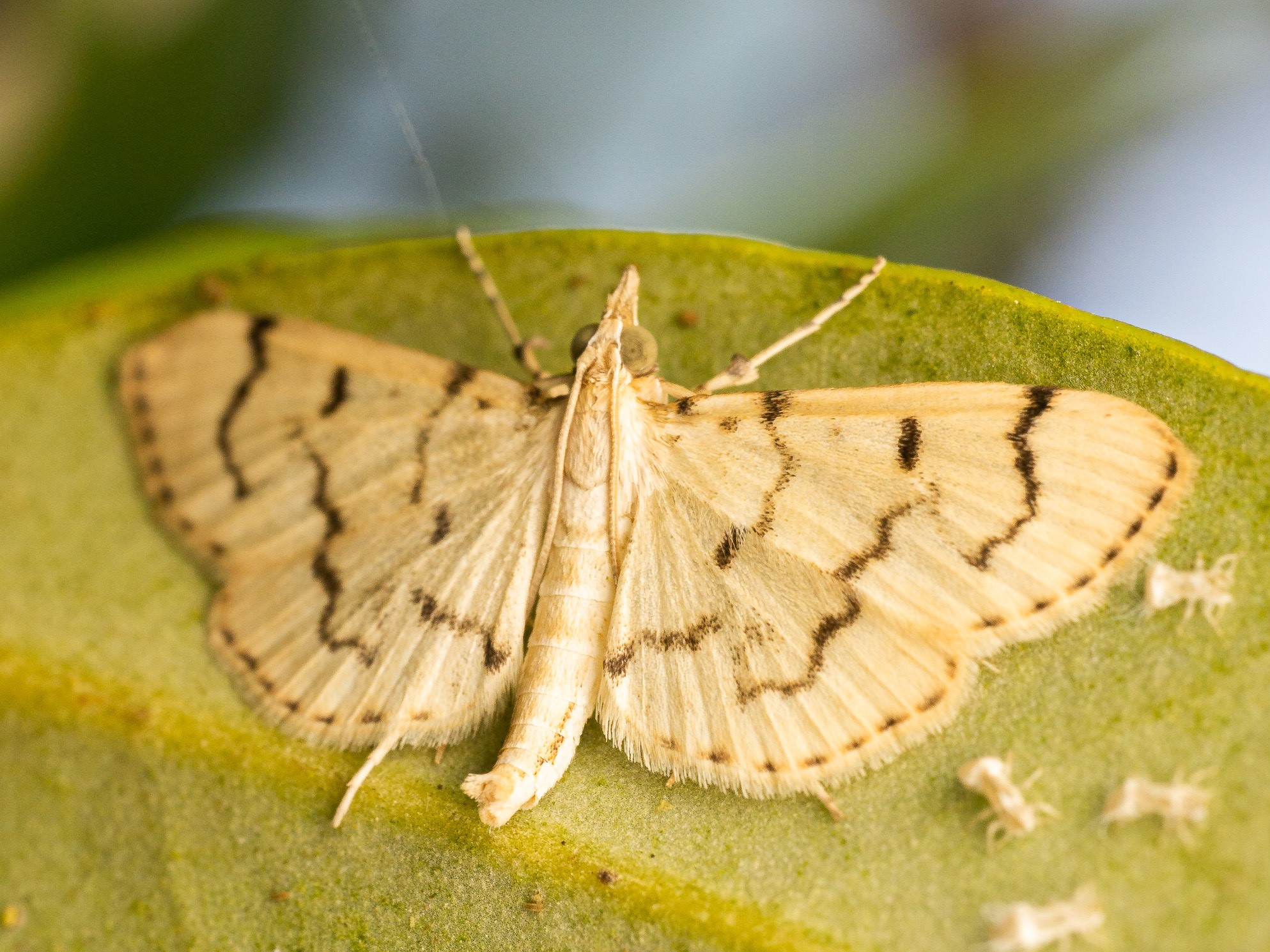

Scientific classification
- Kingdom: Animalia
- Phylum: Arthropoda
- Clade: Pancrustacea
- Class: Insecta
- Order: Lepidoptera
- Family: Crambidae
- Genus: Blepharomastix
- Species: B. achroalis

Binomial name
- Blepharomastix achroalis (Hampson, 1913)

Synonyms
- Pyrausta achroalis Hampson, 1913; Stenia achroalis

= Blepharomastix achroalis =

Species of moth

Blepharomastix achroalis is a species of moth in the family Crambidae. It is found in Jamaica, Cuba, and Florida.

The wingspan is 16–18 mm. Adults are on wing from January to March, May to August and October to December in Florida.
