= Blepharomastix costaliparilis =

Scientific classification
- Kingdom: Animalia
- Phylum: Arthropoda
- Clade: Pancrustacea
- Class: Insecta
- Order: Lepidoptera
- Family: Crambidae
- Genus: Blepharomastix
- Species: B. costaliparilis

Binomial name
- Blepharomastix costaliparilis Munroe, 1995

Synonyms
- Stenia costalis Hampson, 1907 (preocc.); Stenia colubralis Druce, 1895 (preocc.)

Species of moth

Blepharomastix costaliparilis is a species of moth in the family Crambidae. It was described by Eugene G. Munroe in 1995. It is found in Guatemala.
