= Petrophila insulalis =

Scientific classification
- Kingdom: Animalia
- Phylum: Arthropoda
- Class: Insecta
- Order: Lepidoptera
- Family: Crambidae
- Genus: Petrophila
- Species: P. insulalis

Binomial name
- Petrophila insulalis (Walker, 1862)

Synonyms
- Cataclysta insulalis Walker, 1862

Species of moth

Petrophila insulalis is a moth in the family Crambidae. It was described by Francis Walker in 1862. It is found on Haiti.
