= Petrophila constellalis =

Scientific classification
- Kingdom: Animalia
- Phylum: Arthropoda
- Class: Insecta
- Order: Lepidoptera
- Family: Crambidae
- Genus: Petrophila
- Species: P. constellalis

Binomial name
- Petrophila constellalis (Hampson, 1897)

Synonyms
- Cataclysta constellalis Hampson, 1897

Species of moth

Petrophila constellalis is a species of moth in the family Crambidae. It was described by George Hampson in 1897. It is found in Brazil.
