= Petrophila mignonalis =

Scientific classification
- Domain: Eukaryota
- Kingdom: Animalia
- Phylum: Arthropoda
- Class: Insecta
- Order: Lepidoptera
- Family: Crambidae
- Genus: Petrophila
- Species: P. mignonalis

Binomial name
- Petrophila mignonalis (Dyar, 1914)

Synonyms
- Cataclysta mignonalis Dyar, 1914

Species of moth

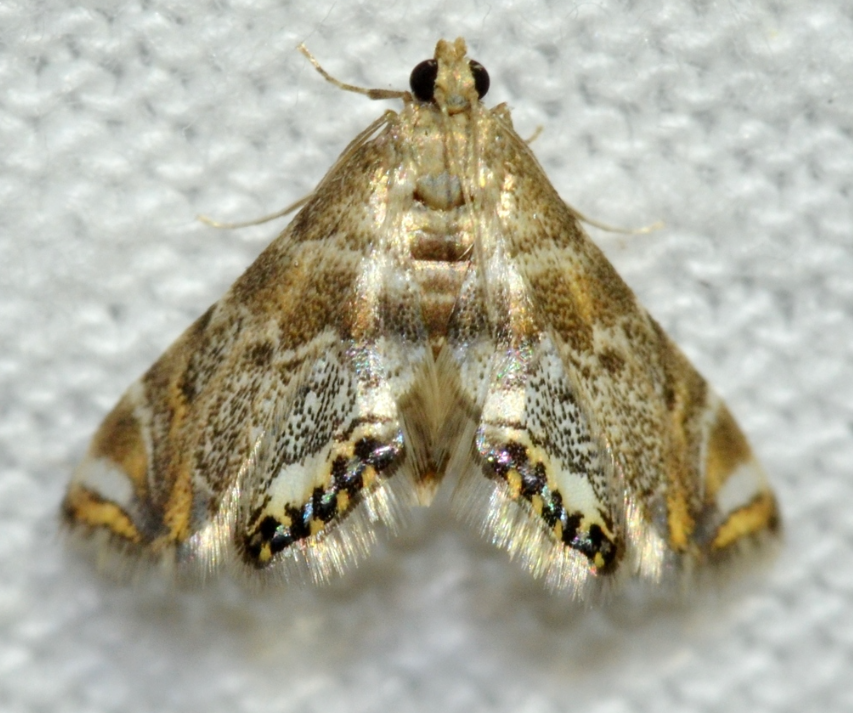
Petrophila Mignonalis

Petrophila mignonalis is a moth in the family Crambidae. It was described by Harrison Gray Dyar Jr. in 1914. It is found in Panama.
