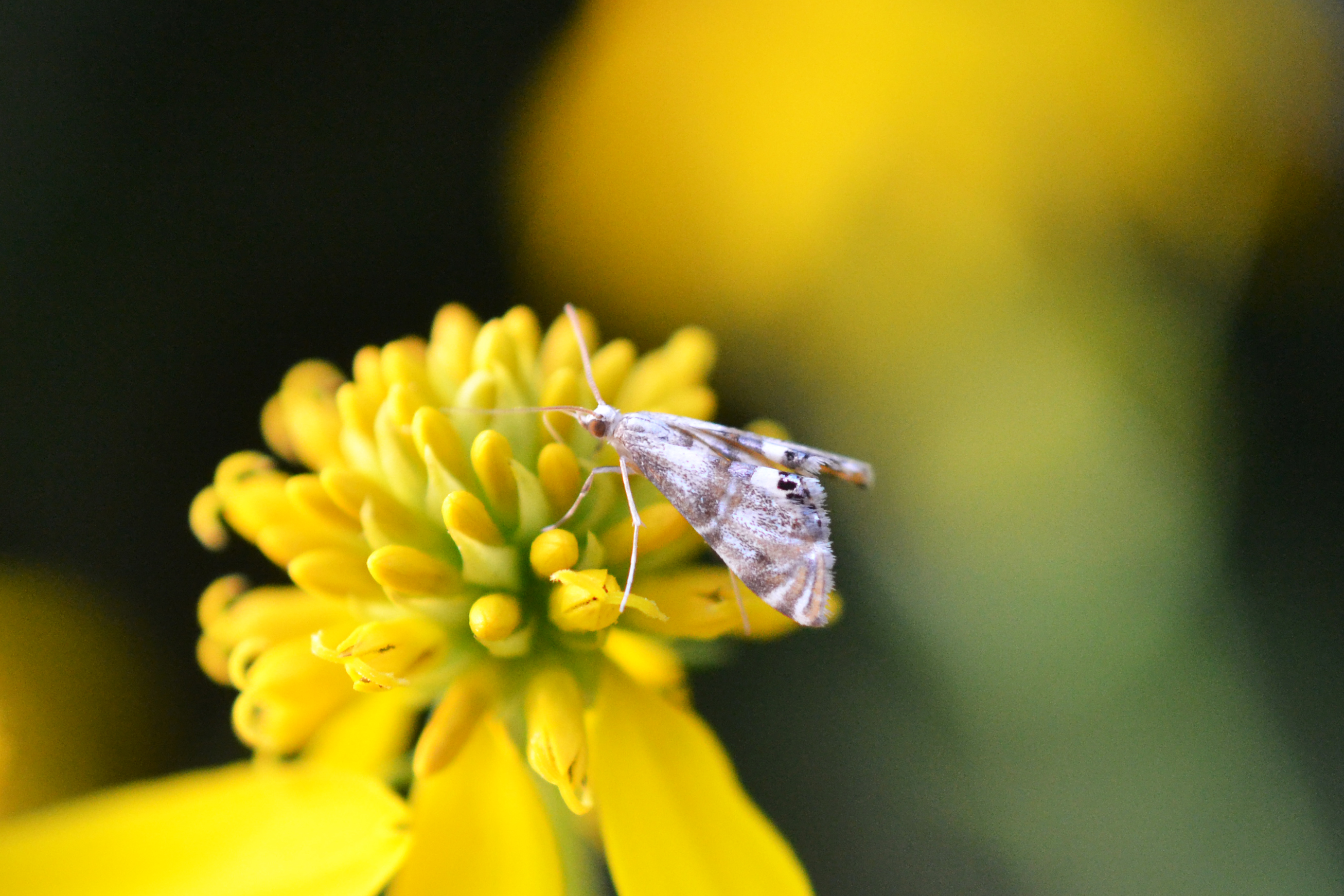
- Petrophila bifascialis

Scientific classification
- Kingdom: Animalia
- Phylum: Arthropoda
- Class: Insecta
- Order: Lepidoptera
- Family: Crambidae
- Subfamily: Acentropinae
- Genus: Petrophila; Guilding, 1830

Synonyms
- Parargyractis Lange, 1956

= Petrophila =

Genus of moths

Petrophila is a genus of moths of the family Crambidae. The genus was described by Lansdown Guilding in 1830.

== Species ==
- Petrophila aealis (Walker, 1859)
- Petrophila aeglesalis (Walker, 1859)
- Petrophila aengusalis (Schaus, 1924)
- Petrophila albulalis (Hampson, 1906)
- Petrophila alvealis (C. Felder, R. Felder & Rogenhofer, 1875)
- Petrophila amethystina (Schaus, 1912)
- Petrophila anna (Solis & Tuskes, 2018)
- Petrophila annulalis (Guenée, 1854)
- Petrophila argyrolepta (Dyar, 1914)
- Petrophila argyrophora (Hampson, 1917)
- Petrophila aroalis (Schaus, 1924)
- Petrophila auspicatalis (Schaus, 1912)
- Petrophila avernalis (Grote, 1878)
- Petrophila axis (Hampson, 1895)
- Petrophila aztecalis (Schaus, 1924)
- Petrophila bedealis (Schaus, 1924)
- Petrophila benezetalis (Schaus, 1924)
- Petrophila bifascialis (Robinson, 1869)
- Petrophila bijonalis (Dyar, 1914)
- Petrophila brunneodora (Dyar, 1914)
- Petrophila cabimalis (Dyar, 1914)
- Petrophila canadensis (Munroe, 1972)
- Petrophila cappsi (Lange, 1956)
- Petrophila cathanalis (Schaus, 1924)
- Petrophila cerrussalis (C. Felder, R. Felder & Rogenhofer, 1875)
- Petrophila chejelalis (Schaus, 1924)
- Petrophila chrysopalis (Hampson, 1906)
- Petrophila climacusalis (Schaus, 1924)
- Petrophila complicatalis (Dyar, 1914:)
- Petrophila conallalis (Schaus, 1924)
- Petrophila confusalis (Walker, 1866)
- Petrophila constellalis (Hampson, 1897)
- Petrophila cornvillia (Solis & Tuskes, 2018)
- Petrophila cronialis (Druce, 1896)
- Petrophila cyloialis (Schaus, 1906)
- Petrophila daemonalis (Dyar, 1907)
- Petrophila danaealis (Hampson, 1906)
- Petrophila darsanialis (Druce, 1896)
- Petrophila dialitha (Dyar, 1914)
- Petrophila doriscalis (Schaus, 1940)
- Petrophila esperanzalis (Schaus, 1924)
- Petrophila flavivittalis (Hampson, 1917)
- Petrophila fluviatilis (Guilding, 1830)
- Petrophila fulicalis (Clemens, 1860)
- Petrophila gemmiferalis (Lederer, 1863)
- Petrophila glycysalis (Dyar, 1914)
- Petrophila gordianalis (Schaus, 1924)
- Petrophila gratalis (Walker, 1866)
- Petrophila guadarensis (Schaus, 1906)
- Petrophila hamiferalis (Hampson, 1906)
- Petrophila heppneri (A. Blanchard & Knudson, 1983)
- Petrophila herminalis (Schaus, 1906)
- Petrophila hodgesi (Munroe, 1972)
- Petrophila inaurata (Stoll in Cramer & Stoll, 1781)
- Petrophila insulalis (Walker, 1862)
- Petrophila iolepta (Dyar, 1914)
- Petrophila jalapalis (Schaus, 1906)
- Petrophila jaliscalis (Schaus, 1906)
- Petrophila kearfottalis (Barnes & McDunnough, 1917)
- Petrophila laurentialis (Schaus, 1924)
- Petrophila leucistis (Dognin, 1906)
- Petrophila longipennis (Hampson, 1906)
- Petrophila lulesalis (Schaus, 1924)
- Petrophila maguilalis (Schaus, 1924)
- Petrophila malcusalis (Schaus, 1924)
- Petrophila maronialis (Schaus, 1924)
- Petrophila mignonalis (Dyar, 1914)
- Petrophila multipicta (Dyar, 1914)
- Petrophila niphoplagalis (Hampson, 1897)
- Petrophila odoalis (Schaus, 1924)
- Petrophila opulentalis (Lederer, 1863)
- Petrophila pantheralis (Walker, 1859)
- Petrophila parvissimalis (Schaus, 1912)
- Petrophila pavonialis (Hampson, 1897)
- Petrophila peraltalis (Schaus, 1912)
- Petrophila phaeopastalis (Hampson, 1917)
- Petrophila premalis (Druce, 1895)
- Petrophila pyropalis (Guenée, 1854)
- Petrophila santafealis (Heppner, 1976)
- Petrophila schaefferalis (Dyar, 1906)
- Petrophila schistopalis (Hampson, 1906)
- Petrophila schwarzalis (Schaus, 1924)
- Petrophila sumptuosalis (Möschler, 1890)
- Petrophila tessimalis (Dyar, 1926)
- Petrophila tristalis (Schaus, 1912)
- Petrophila triumphalis (Schaus, 1912)
- Petrophila ulfridalis (Schaus, 1924)
- Petrophila unilinealis (Dyar, 1914)
- Petrophila valstanalis (Schaus, 1924)
- Petrophila zamoralis (Schaus, 1924)
- Petrophila zelota (Dyar, 1914)

== Former species ==
- Petrophila aclistalis Dyar, 1914
- Petrophila divisalis (Walker, 1866)
