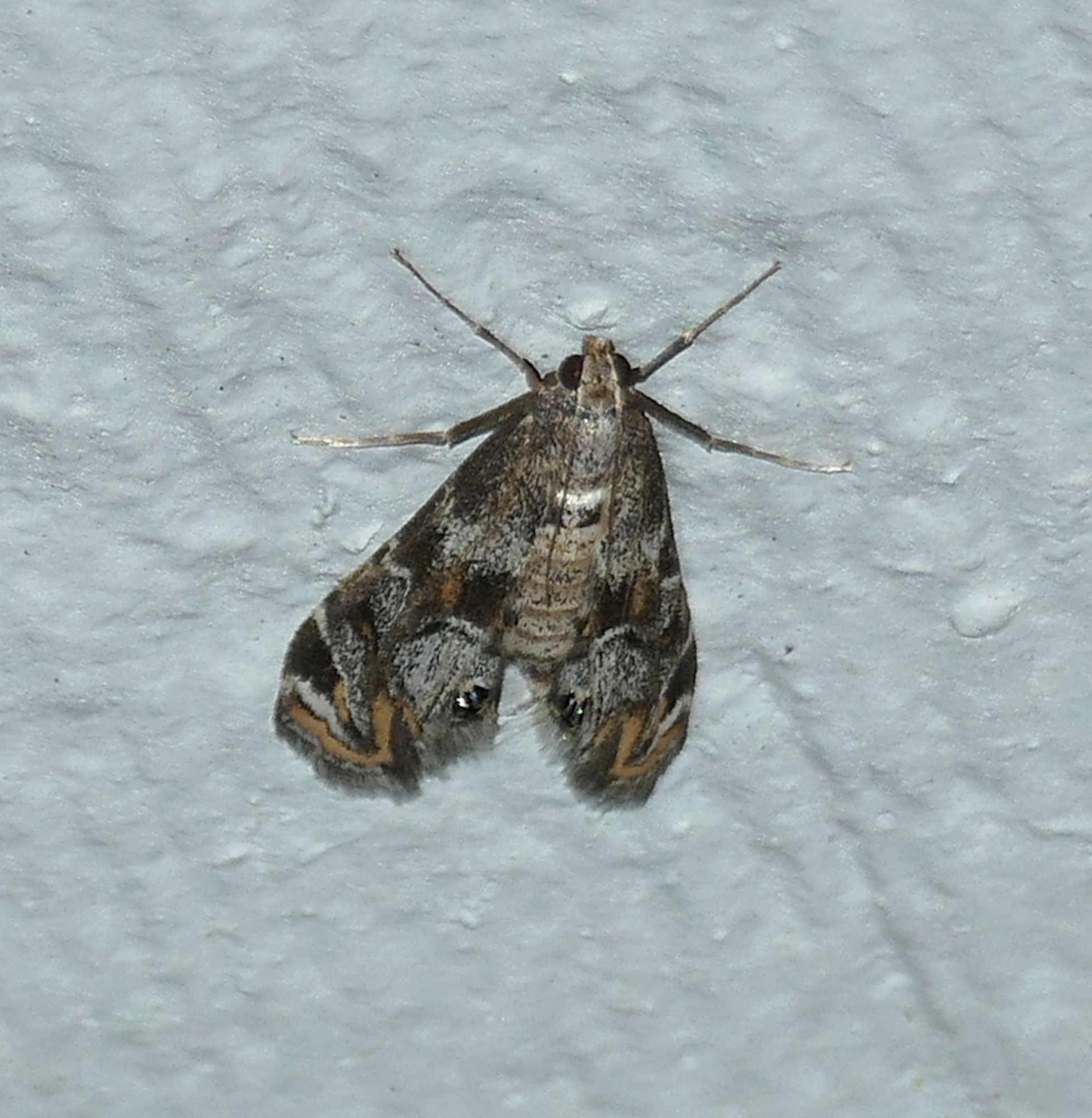

Scientific classification
- Kingdom: Animalia
- Phylum: Arthropoda
- Class: Insecta
- Order: Lepidoptera
- Family: Crambidae
- Genus: Petrophila
- Species: P. longipennis

Binomial name
- Petrophila longipennis (Hampson, 1906)

Synonyms
- Argyractis longipennis Hampson, 1906

= Petrophila longipennis =

Species of moth

Petrophila longipennis is a moth in the family Crambidae. It was described by George Hampson in 1906. It is found in Mexico.
