= Petrophila schistopalis =

Scientific classification
- Kingdom: Animalia
- Phylum: Arthropoda
- Class: Insecta
- Order: Lepidoptera
- Family: Crambidae
- Genus: Petrophila
- Species: P. schistopalis

Binomial name
- Petrophila schistopalis (Hampson, 1906)

Synonyms
- Argyractis schistopalis Hampson, 1906

Species of moth

Petrophila schistopalis is a moth in the family Crambidae. It was described by George Hampson in 1906. It is found in Tabasco, Mexico.
