= Petrophila aealis =

Scientific classification
- Kingdom: Animalia
- Phylum: Arthropoda
- Class: Insecta
- Order: Lepidoptera
- Family: Crambidae
- Genus: Petrophila
- Species: P. aealis

Binomial name
- Petrophila aealis (Walker, 1859)

Synonyms
- Agyractis aealis Walker, 1859

Species of moth

Petrophila aealis is a moth in the family Crambidae. It was described by Francis Walker in 1859. It is found in Rio de Janeiro, Brazil.
