= Petrophila avernalis =

Scientific classification
- Domain: Eukaryota
- Kingdom: Animalia
- Phylum: Arthropoda
- Class: Insecta
- Order: Lepidoptera
- Family: Crambidae
- Genus: Petrophila
- Species: P. avernalis

Binomial name
- Petrophila avernalis (Grote, 1878)

Synonyms
- Chrysendeton avernalis Grote, 1878; Argyractis confusalis Barnes & McDunnough, 1913

Species of moth

Petrophila avernalis is a moth in the family Crambidae. It was described by Augustus Radcliffe Grote in 1878. It is found in North America, where it has been recorded from Arizona, Colorado, New Mexico, South Dakota and Wyoming.

Adults have been recorded on wing from June to September.
