= Petrophila cappsi =

Scientific classification
- Domain: Eukaryota
- Kingdom: Animalia
- Phylum: Arthropoda
- Class: Insecta
- Order: Lepidoptera
- Family: Crambidae
- Genus: Petrophila
- Species: P. cappsi

Binomial name
- Petrophila cappsi (Lange, 1956)

Synonyms
- Parargyractis cappsi Lange, 1956

Species of moth

Petrophila cappsi is a moth in the family Crambidae. It was described by William Harry Lange in 1956. It is found in North America, where it has been recorded from Arizona.
