= Petrophila tristalis =

Scientific classification
- Domain: Eukaryota
- Kingdom: Animalia
- Phylum: Arthropoda
- Class: Insecta
- Order: Lepidoptera
- Family: Crambidae
- Genus: Petrophila
- Species: P. tristalis

Binomial name
- Petrophila tristalis (Schaus, 1912)

Synonyms
- Argyractis tristalis Schaus, 1912; Argyractis cineralis Schaus, 1906

Species of moth

Petrophila tristalis is a moth in the family Crambidae. It was described by Schaus in 1912. It is found in Costa Rica.
