= Petrophila tessimalis =

Scientific classification
- Domain: Eukaryota
- Kingdom: Animalia
- Phylum: Arthropoda
- Class: Insecta
- Order: Lepidoptera
- Family: Crambidae
- Genus: Petrophila
- Species: P. tessimalis

Binomial name
- Petrophila tessimalis (Dyar, 1926)

Synonyms
- Argyractis tessimalis Dyar, 1926

Species of moth

Petrophila tessimalis is a moth in the family Crambidae. It was described by Harrison Gray Dyar Jr. in 1926. It is found in Mexico.
