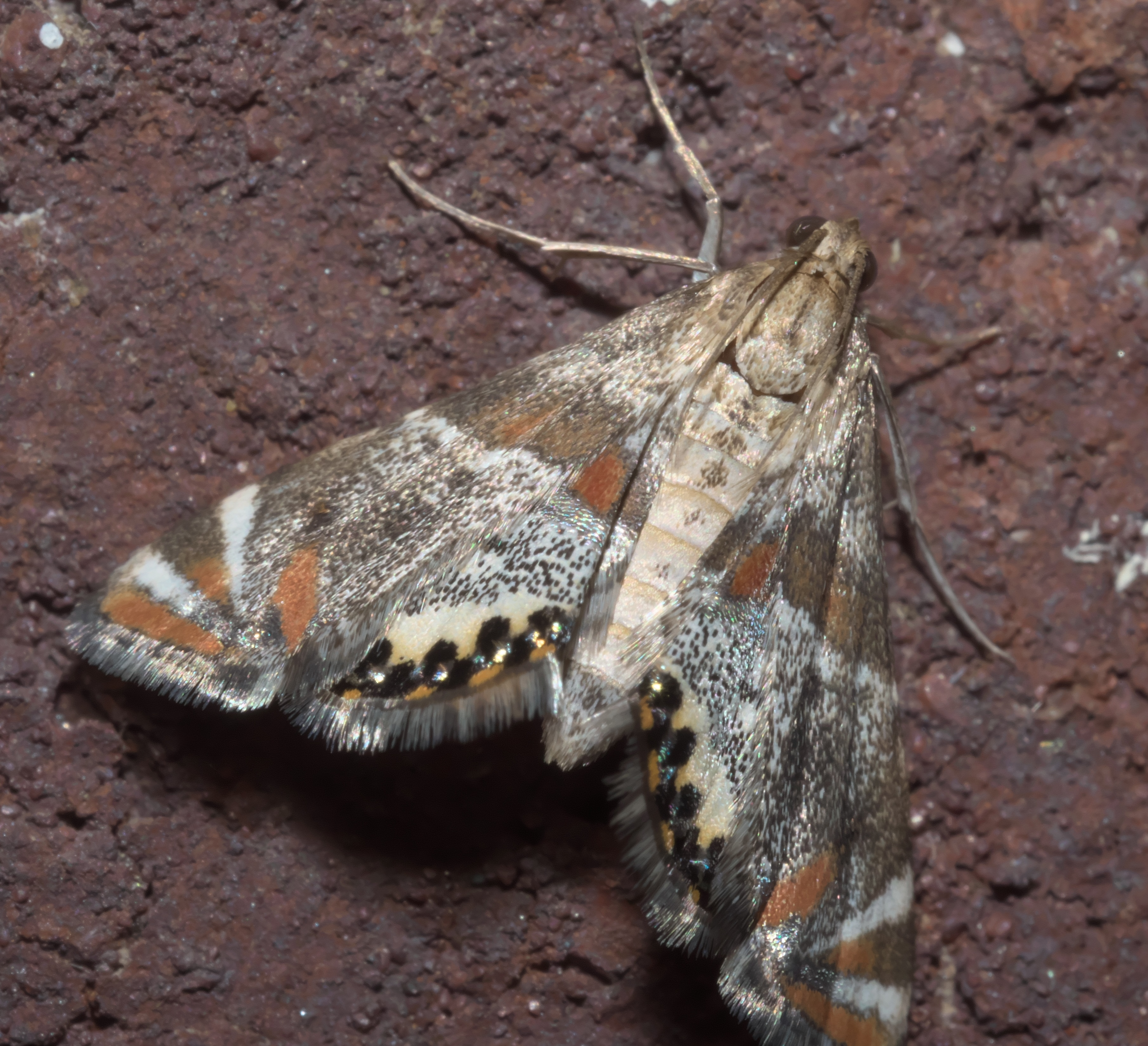

Scientific classification
- Domain: Eukaryota
- Kingdom: Animalia
- Phylum: Arthropoda
- Class: Insecta
- Order: Lepidoptera
- Family: Crambidae
- Genus: Petrophila
- Species: P. jaliscalis

Binomial name
- Petrophila jaliscalis (Schaus, 1906)

Synonyms
- Cataclysta jaliscalis Schaus, 1906; Elophila satanalis Dyar, 1917

= Petrophila jaliscalis =

Species of moth

Petrophila jaliscalis is a species of moth in the family Crambidae. It was described by Schaus in 1906. It is found in Mexico (Jalisco) and from Alberta to Texas, Arizona and California.

The length of the forewings is 7–11 mm. Adults have been recorded on wing nearly year round.

The larvae are aquatic and probably feed on algae.
