= Petrophila chrysopalis =

Scientific classification
- Kingdom: Animalia
- Phylum: Arthropoda
- Class: Insecta
- Order: Lepidoptera
- Family: Crambidae
- Genus: Petrophila
- Species: P. chrysopalis

Binomial name
- Petrophila chrysopalis (Hampson, 1906)

Synonyms
- Argyractis chrysopalis Hampson, 1906

Species of moth

Petrophila chrysopalis is a moth in the family Crambidae. It was described by George Hampson in 1906. It is found in Mexico.
