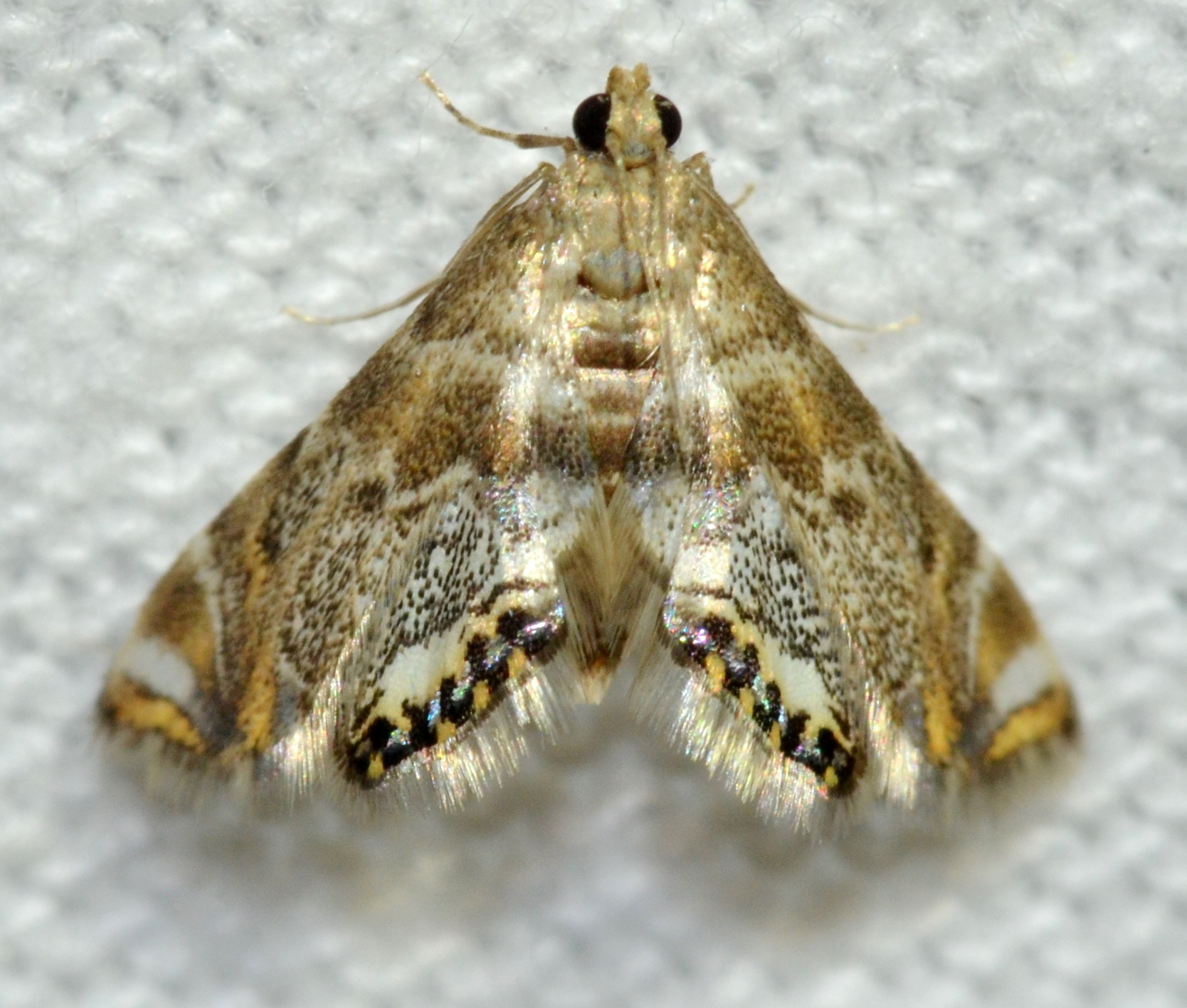

Scientific classification
- Kingdom: Animalia
- Phylum: Arthropoda
- Class: Insecta
- Order: Lepidoptera
- Family: Crambidae
- Genus: Petrophila
- Species: P. confusalis

Binomial name
- Petrophila confusalis (Walker, 1866)

Synonyms
- Cataclysta confusalis Walker, 1866; Elophila truckeealis Dyar, 1917; Parargyractis confusalis Tuskes, 1977

= Petrophila confusalis =

Species of moth

Petrophila confusalis, the confusing petrophila moth, is a semi-aquatic moth in the family Crambidae. It was described by Francis Walker in 1866. The length of the forewing is 5–11 mm. Adults are on wing from April to September.

== Distribution ==
Petrophila confusalis is found in North America, where it has been recorded from British Columbia, California, Maryland, Minnesota, Montana, Nevada, Oregon, Texas, Washington and Wyoming. It can be found living in and around lotic or fast-moving streams.

== Ecology ==
=== Interactions with the environment ===
Petrophila confusalis acts as a host for the parasitic aquatic wasp Tanychela pilosa. The wasp infects the pupal cocoon of P. confusalis. When infected, the wasp pupal cocoon can be observed within the moth pupal cocoon. Additionally, P. confusalis is preyed upon by small aquatic vertebrates.

During its caterpillar stage, P. confusalis feeds on green algae and diatoms, including Cladophora, Synedra ulna, and Gomphonema olivaceum, among others. “Grazing zones” used by P. confusalis are often quite large, and can contribute to epilithic spatial patchiness.

=== Anthropogenic and climate interactions ===
Habitat degradation due to anthropogenic factors and climate change may affect P. confusalis. While the moth does not exhibit temperature dependent emergence, warmer water appears to negatively affect adult body size, which may impact reproduction. However, the moth also appears to be able to persist at sites impacted by habitat degradation.

In 2021, P. confusalis was listed on the “Plant and animal watch list” by the Nevada Division of Natural Heritage due to decline in population levels.
