= Petrophila albulalis =

Scientific classification
- Kingdom: Animalia
- Phylum: Arthropoda
- Class: Insecta
- Order: Lepidoptera
- Family: Crambidae
- Genus: Petrophila
- Species: P. albulalis

Binomial name
- Petrophila albulalis (Hampson, 1906)

Synonyms
- Argyractis albulalis Hampson, 1906

Species of moth

Petrophila albulalis is a moth in the family Crambidae. It was described by George Hampson in 1906. It is found on Jamaica and Cuba.
