= Petrophila heppneri =

Scientific classification
- Domain: Eukaryota
- Kingdom: Animalia
- Phylum: Arthropoda
- Class: Insecta
- Order: Lepidoptera
- Family: Crambidae
- Genus: Petrophila
- Species: P. heppneri

Binomial name
- Petrophila heppneri A. Blanchard & Knudson, 1983

Species of moth

Petrophila heppneri is a moth in the family Crambidae. It was described by André Blanchard and Edward C. Knudson in 1983. It is found in North America, where it has been recorded from Texas.
