= Petrophila gratalis =

Scientific classification
- Kingdom: Animalia
- Phylum: Arthropoda
- Class: Insecta
- Order: Lepidoptera
- Family: Crambidae
- Genus: Petrophila
- Species: P. gratalis

Binomial name
- Petrophila gratalis (Walker, 1866)

Synonyms
- Cataclysta gratalis Walker, 1866

Species of moth

Petrophila gratalis is a moth in the family Crambidae. It was described by Francis Walker in 1866. It is found in the Dominican Republic.
