= Petrophila argyrolepta =

Scientific classification
- Kingdom: Animalia
- Phylum: Arthropoda
- Class: Insecta
- Order: Lepidoptera
- Family: Crambidae
- Genus: Petrophila
- Species: P. argyrolepta

Binomial name
- Petrophila argyrolepta (Dyar, 1914)

Synonyms
- Cataclysta argyrolepta Dyar, 1914; Argyractis argyrolepta

Species of moth

Petrophila argyrolepta is a species of moth in the family Crambidae. It was described by Harrison Gray Dyar Jr. in 1914. It is found in Panama, Costa Rica and Honduras.
