= Petrophila leucistis =

Scientific classification
- Domain: Eukaryota
- Kingdom: Animalia
- Phylum: Arthropoda
- Class: Insecta
- Order: Lepidoptera
- Family: Crambidae
- Genus: Petrophila
- Species: P. leucistis

Binomial name
- Petrophila leucistis (Dognin, 1906)

Synonyms
- Argyractis leucistis Dognin, 1906

Species of moth

Petrophila leucistis is a moth in the family Crambidae. It was described by Paul Dognin in 1906. It is found in Ecuador.
