= Petrophila fluviatilis =

Scientific classification
- Domain: Eukaryota
- Kingdom: Animalia
- Phylum: Arthropoda
- Class: Insecta
- Order: Lepidoptera
- Family: Crambidae
- Genus: Petrophila
- Species: P. fluviatilis

Binomial name
- Petrophila fluviatilis Guilding, 1830

Species of moth

Petrophila fluviatilis is a moth in the family Crambidae. It was described by Lansdown Guilding in 1830.
