= Petrophila guadarensis =

Scientific classification
- Kingdom: Animalia
- Phylum: Arthropoda
- Class: Insecta
- Order: Lepidoptera
- Family: Crambidae
- Genus: Petrophila
- Species: P. guadarensis

Binomial name
- Petrophila guadarensis (Schaus, 1906)

Synonyms
- Argyractis guadarensis Schaus, 1906

Species of moth

Petrophila guadarensis is a moth in the family Crambidae. It was described by Schaus in 1906. It is found in Mexico.
