= Petrophila schaefferalis =

Scientific classification
- Kingdom: Animalia
- Phylum: Arthropoda
- Clade: Pancrustacea
- Class: Insecta
- Order: Lepidoptera
- Family: Crambidae
- Genus: Petrophila
- Species: P. schaefferalis

Binomial name
- Petrophila schaefferalis (Dyar, 1906)

Synonyms
- Elophila schaefferalis Dyar, 1906; Argyractis castusalis Schaus, 1924

Species of moth

Petrophila schaefferalis is a moth in the family Crambidae. It was described by Harrison Gray Dyar Jr. in 1906. It is found in Mexico (Xalapa) and the southern United States, where it has been recorded from Arizona, California and Texas.

The wingspan is 17–20 mm for males and 24–29 mm for females. Adults have been recorded on wing from April to September.

The larvae are aquatic.
