= Petrophila zamoralis =

Scientific classification
- Domain: Eukaryota
- Kingdom: Animalia
- Phylum: Arthropoda
- Class: Insecta
- Order: Lepidoptera
- Family: Crambidae
- Genus: Petrophila
- Species: P. zamoralis

Binomial name
- Petrophila zamoralis (Schaus, 1924)

Synonyms
- Argyractis zamoralis Schaus, 1924

Species of moth

Petrophila zamoralis is a moth in the family Crambidae. It was described by Schaus in 1924. It is found in Ecuador.
