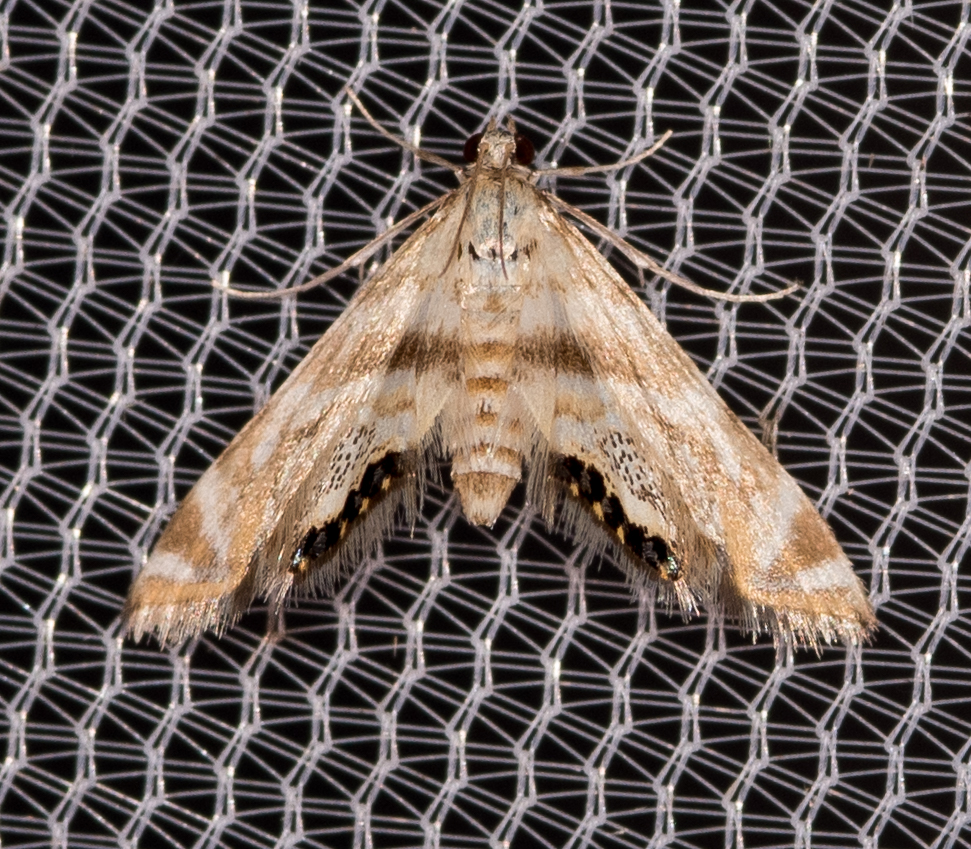
- Adult

Scientific classification
- Kingdom: Animalia
- Phylum: Arthropoda
- Clade: Pancrustacea
- Class: Insecta
- Order: Lepidoptera
- Family: Crambidae
- Genus: Petrophila
- Species: P. fulicalis

Binomial name
- Petrophila fulicalis (Clemens, 1860)

Synonyms
- Cataclysta fulicalis Clemens, 1860; Elophila fulicalis; Argyractis fulicalis; Parargyractis fulicalis; Cataclysta angulatalis Lederer, 1863

= Petrophila fulicalis =

Species of moth

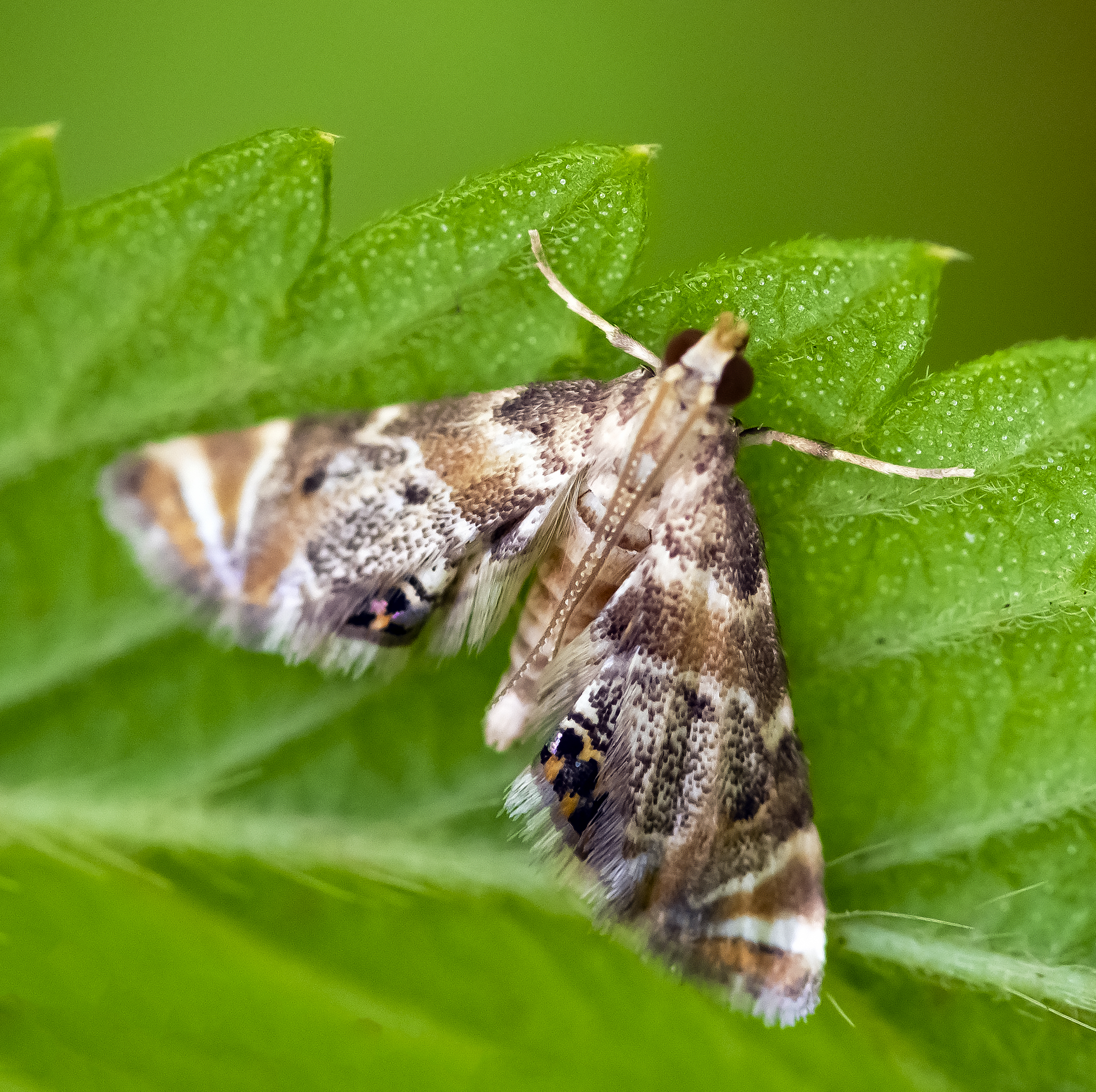
Feather-edged Petrophila (Petrophila fulicalis)

Petrophila fulicalis is a moth in the family Crambidae. It was described by James Brackenridge Clemens in 1860. It is found in North America, where it has been recorded from Alabama, Florida, Indiana, Maine, Maryland, Michigan, New York, North Carolina, Ohio, Oklahoma, Ontario, Pennsylvania, Tennessee and West Virginia.
