= Petrophila santafealis =

Scientific classification
- Kingdom: Animalia
- Phylum: Arthropoda
- Clade: Pancrustacea
- Class: Insecta
- Order: Lepidoptera
- Family: Crambidae
- Genus: Petrophila
- Species: P. santafealis

Binomial name
- Petrophila santafealis (Heppner, 1976)

Synonyms
- Parargyractis santafealis Heppner, 1976

Species of moth

Petrophila santafealis is a moth in the family Crambidae. It was described by John B. Heppner in 1976. It is found in North America, where it has been recorded from Arizona and Florida.

The length of the forewings is 5.2–7 mm for males and 6.5–9 mm for females. Adults have been recorded on wing year round.

The larvae are aquatic and feed on algae.

== Etymology ==
It is named for Florida's Santa Fe River, the type location.
