= Petrophila annulalis =

Scientific classification
- Kingdom: Animalia
- Phylum: Arthropoda
- Class: Insecta
- Order: Lepidoptera
- Family: Crambidae
- Genus: Petrophila
- Species: P. annulalis

Binomial name
- Petrophila annulalis (Guenée, 1854)

Synonyms
- Cataclysta annulalis Guenée, 1854

Species of moth

Petrophila annulalis is a moth in the family Crambidae. It was described by Achille Guenée in 1854. It is found in Brazil.
