= Petrophila doriscalis =

Scientific classification
- Domain: Eukaryota
- Kingdom: Animalia
- Phylum: Arthropoda
- Class: Insecta
- Order: Lepidoptera
- Family: Crambidae
- Genus: Petrophila
- Species: P. doriscalis

Binomial name
- Petrophila doriscalis (Schaus, 1940)

Synonyms
- Argyractis doriscalis Schaus, 1940

Species of moth

Petrophila doriscalis is a moth in the family Crambidae. It was described by Schaus in 1940. It is found in Puerto Rico.
