= Petrophila complicatalis =

Scientific classification
- Kingdom: Animalia
- Phylum: Arthropoda
- Class: Insecta
- Order: Lepidoptera
- Family: Crambidae
- Genus: Petrophila
- Species: P. complicatalis

Binomial name
- Petrophila complicatalis (Dyar, 1914)

Synonyms
- Cataclysta complicatalis Dyar, 1914

Species of moth

Petrophila complicatalis is a moth in the family Crambidae. It was described by Harrison Gray Dyar Jr. in 1914. It is found in Panama.
