= Petrophila hodgesi =

Scientific classification
- Domain: Eukaryota
- Kingdom: Animalia
- Phylum: Arthropoda
- Class: Insecta
- Order: Lepidoptera
- Family: Crambidae
- Genus: Petrophila
- Species: P. hodgesi

Binomial name
- Petrophila hodgesi (Munroe, 1972)

Synonyms
- Parargyractis hodgesi Munroe, 1972

Species of moth

Petrophila hodgesi is a moth in the family Crambidae. It was described by Eugene G. Munroe in 1972. It is found in North America, where it has been recorded from Arkansas and Oklahoma.
