= Petrophila niphoplagalis =

Scientific classification
- Kingdom: Animalia
- Phylum: Arthropoda
- Class: Insecta
- Order: Lepidoptera
- Family: Crambidae
- Genus: Petrophila
- Species: P. niphoplagalis

Binomial name
- Petrophila niphoplagalis (Hampson, 1897)

Synonyms
- Argyractis niphoplagalis Hampson, 1897

Species of moth

Petrophila niphoplagalis is a species of moth in the family Crambidae. It was described by George Hampson in 1897. It is found in Dominica.
