= Petrophila premalis =

Scientific classification
- Domain: Eukaryota
- Kingdom: Animalia
- Phylum: Arthropoda
- Class: Insecta
- Order: Lepidoptera
- Family: Crambidae
- Genus: Petrophila
- Species: P. premalis

Binomial name
- Petrophila premalis (H. Druce, 1895)

Synonyms
- Cataclysta premalis H. Druce, 1895; Argyractis premalis

Species of moth

Petrophila premalis is a moth in the family Crambidae first described by Herbert Druce in 1895. It is found in Mexico.
