= Petrophila aeglesalis =

Scientific classification
- Kingdom: Animalia
- Phylum: Arthropoda
- Class: Insecta
- Order: Lepidoptera
- Family: Crambidae
- Genus: Petrophila
- Species: P. aeglesalis

Binomial name
- Petrophila aeglesalis (Walker, 1859)

Synonyms
- Cataclysta aeglesalis Walker, 1859

Species of moth

Petrophila aeglesalis is a moth in the family Crambidae. It was described by Francis Walker in 1859. It is found in Rio de Janeiro, Brazil.
