= Petrophila danaealis =

Scientific classification
- Kingdom: Animalia
- Phylum: Arthropoda
- Class: Insecta
- Order: Lepidoptera
- Family: Crambidae
- Genus: Petrophila
- Species: P. danaealis

Binomial name
- Petrophila danaealis (Hampson, 1906)

Synonyms
- Argyractis danaealis Hampson, 1906

Species of moth

Petrophila danaealis is a moth in the family Crambidae. It was described by George Hampson in 1906, and it lives in Mexico.
