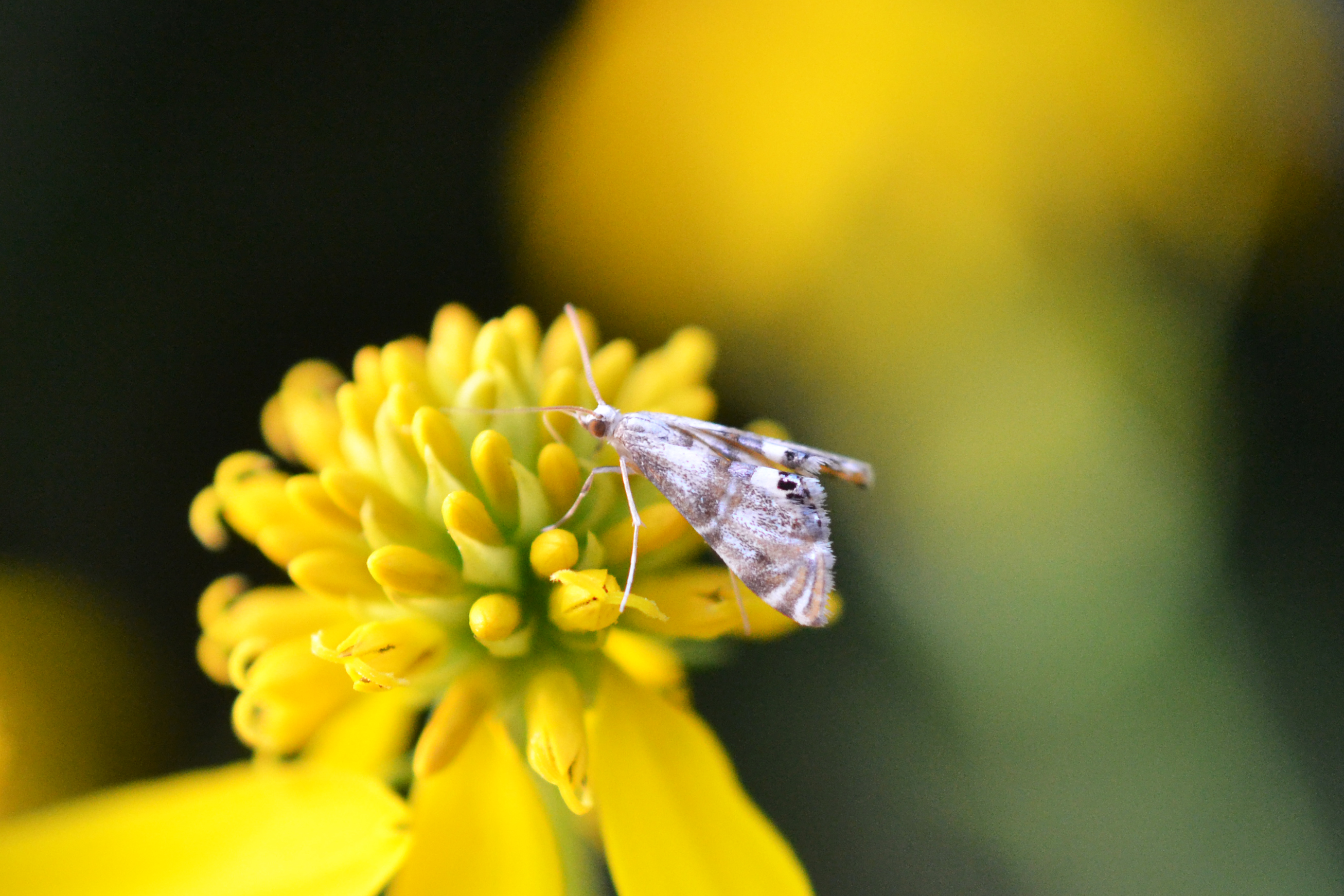

Scientific classification
- Domain: Eukaryota
- Kingdom: Animalia
- Phylum: Arthropoda
- Class: Insecta
- Order: Lepidoptera
- Family: Crambidae
- Genus: Petrophila
- Species: P. bifascialis

Binomial name
- Petrophila bifascialis (Robinson, 1869)

Synonyms
- Cataclysta bifascialis Robinson, 1869; Elophila bifascialis; Argyractis bifascialis; Parargyractis bifascialis

= Petrophila bifascialis =

Species of moth

Petrophila bifascialis, the two-banded petrophila moth, is a moth in the family Crambidae. It was described by Robinson in 1869. It is found in North America, where it has been recorded from Nova Scotia to Florida, west to Texas and north to Ontario.

The wingspan is between 11 and 24 mm. Adults are on wing from late May to September.

The larvae are aquatic, feeding on diatoms and algae.

== See also ==
- List of moths of Canada
- List of moths of the United States
