= Petrophila daemonalis =

Scientific classification
- Domain: Eukaryota
- Kingdom: Animalia
- Phylum: Arthropoda
- Class: Insecta
- Order: Lepidoptera
- Family: Crambidae
- Genus: Petrophila
- Species: P. daemonalis

Binomial name
- Petrophila daemonalis (Dyar, 1907)

Synonyms
- Elophila daemonalis Dyar, 1907

Species of moth

Petrophila daemonalis is a moth in the family Crambidae. It was first described by Harrison Gray Dyar Jr. in 1907. It has been recorded in the US state of Texas.
