= Petrophila jalapalis =

Scientific classification
- Domain: Eukaryota
- Kingdom: Animalia
- Phylum: Arthropoda
- Class: Insecta
- Order: Lepidoptera
- Family: Crambidae
- Genus: Petrophila
- Species: P. jalapalis

Binomial name
- Petrophila jalapalis (Schaus, 1906)

Synonyms
- Argyractis jalapalis Schaus, 1906; Argyractis orizabalis Schaus, 1906; Cataclysta orizabalis

Species of moth

Petrophila jalapalis is a moth in the family Crambidae. It was described by Schaus in 1906. It is found in Mexico.
