= Petrophila gemmiferalis =

Scientific classification
- Domain: Eukaryota
- Kingdom: Animalia
- Phylum: Arthropoda
- Class: Insecta
- Order: Lepidoptera
- Family: Crambidae
- Genus: Petrophila
- Species: P. gemmiferalis

Binomial name
- Petrophila gemmiferalis (Lederer, 1863)

Synonyms
- Cataclysta gemmiferalis Lederer, 1863

Species of moth

Petrophila gemmiferalis is a moth in the family Crambidae. It was described by Julius Lederer in 1863. It is found in Venezuela and Brazil.
