= Petrophila cronialis =

Scientific classification
- Domain: Eukaryota
- Kingdom: Animalia
- Phylum: Arthropoda
- Class: Insecta
- Order: Lepidoptera
- Family: Crambidae
- Genus: Petrophila
- Species: P. cronialis

Binomial name
- Petrophila cronialis (H. Druce, 1896)

Synonyms
- Cataclysta cronialis H. Druce, 1896

Species of moth

Petrophila cronialis is a moth in the family Crambidae. It was described by Herbert Druce in 1896. It is found in Mexico.
