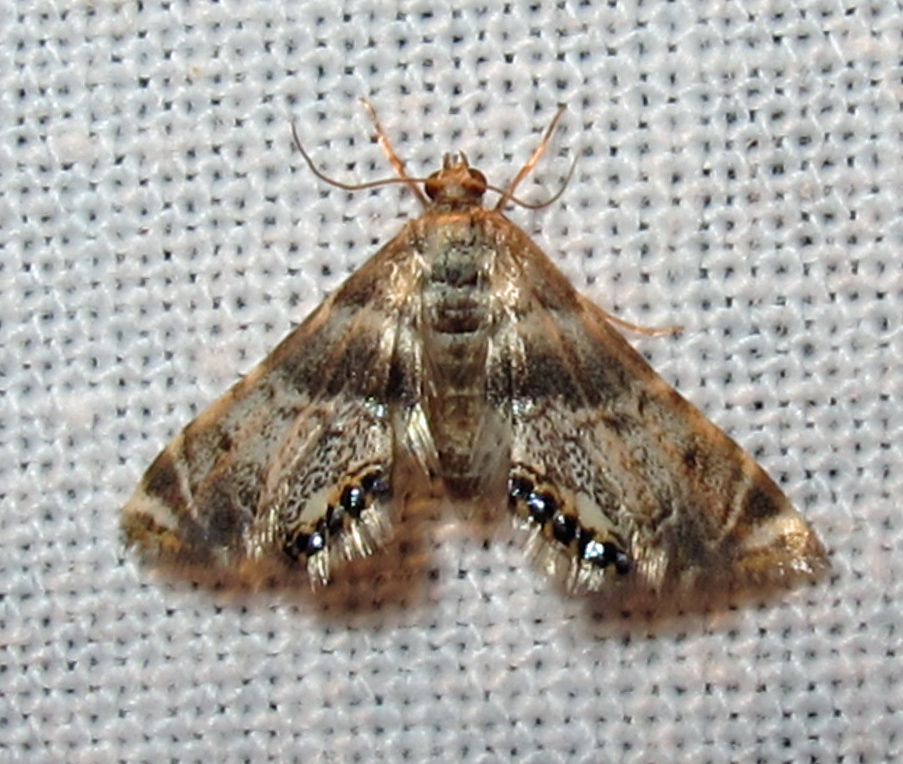

Scientific classification
- Kingdom: Animalia
- Phylum: Arthropoda
- Class: Insecta
- Order: Lepidoptera
- Family: Crambidae
- Genus: Petrophila
- Species: P. canadensis

Binomial name
- Petrophila canadensis (Munroe, 1972)

Synonyms
- Parargyractis canadensis Munroe, 1972

= Petrophila canadensis =

Species of moth

Petrophila canadensis, the Canadian petrophila moth, is a moth in the family Crambidae. It was described by Eugene G. Munroe in 1972. It is found in North America, where it has been recorded from southern Canada and the north-eastern United States.

Its wingspan is 11–18 mm. Adults are on wing from May to September in two generations per year.

The larvae are aquatic and feed on diatoms, including Navicula and Cymbella species. They have also been recorded feeding on algae. The species overwinters as an adult.
