= Petrophila parvissimalis =

Scientific classification
- Domain: Eukaryota
- Kingdom: Animalia
- Phylum: Arthropoda
- Class: Insecta
- Order: Lepidoptera
- Family: Crambidae
- Genus: Petrophila
- Species: P. parvissimalis

Binomial name
- Petrophila parvissimalis (Schaus, 1912)

Synonyms
- Argyractis parvissimalis Schaus, 1912

Species of moth

Petrophila parvissimalis is a moth in the family Crambidae. It was described by Schaus in 1912. It is found in Costa Rica.
