= Petrophila kearfottalis =

Scientific classification
- Domain: Eukaryota
- Kingdom: Animalia
- Phylum: Arthropoda
- Class: Insecta
- Order: Lepidoptera
- Family: Crambidae
- Genus: Petrophila
- Species: P. kearfottalis

Binomial name
- Petrophila kearfottalis (Barnes & McDunnough, 1917)

Synonyms
- Cataclysta kearfottalis Barnes & McDunnough, 1917; Elophila bifascialis ab. kearfottalis Dyar, 1906

Species of moth

Petrophila kearfottalis is a moth in the family Crambidae first described by William Barnes and James Halliday McDunnough in 1917. It is found in North America, where it has been recorded from Alberta, Arizona, British Columbia, California, Colorado, Montana, New Mexico and Texas.

The larvae probably feed on algae.
