= Petrophila inaurata =

Scientific classification
- Domain: Eukaryota
- Kingdom: Animalia
- Phylum: Arthropoda
- Class: Insecta
- Order: Lepidoptera
- Family: Crambidae
- Genus: Petrophila
- Species: P. inaurata

Binomial name
- Petrophila inaurata (Stoll in Cramer & Stoll, 1781)

Synonyms
- Phalaena inaurata Stoll, 1781; Phalaena inauralis Stoll, 1787

Species of moth

Petrophila inaurata is a moth in the family Crambidae. It was described by Stoll in 1781. It is found in Suriname.
