= Petrophila hamiferalis =

Scientific classification
- Domain: Eukaryota
- Kingdom: Animalia
- Phylum: Arthropoda
- Class: Insecta
- Order: Lepidoptera
- Family: Crambidae
- Genus: Petrophila
- Species: P. hamiferalis

Binomial name
- Petrophila hamiferalis (Hampson, 1906)

Synonyms
- Argyractis hamiferalis Hampson, 1906

Species of moth

Petrophila hamiferalis is a moth in the family Crambidae. It was described by George Hampson in 1906. It is found in Mexico.
