= Petrophila flavivittalis =

Scientific classification
- Kingdom: Animalia
- Phylum: Arthropoda
- Class: Insecta
- Order: Lepidoptera
- Family: Crambidae
- Genus: Petrophila
- Species: P. flavivittalis

Binomial name
- Petrophila flavivittalis (Hampson, 1917)

Synonyms
- Argyractis flavivittalis Hampson, 1917

Species of moth

Petrophila flavivittalis is a moth in the family Crambidae. It was described by George Hampson in 1917. It is found in Peru.
