= Petrophila aengusalis =

Scientific classification
- Kingdom: Animalia
- Phylum: Arthropoda
- Class: Insecta
- Order: Lepidoptera
- Family: Crambidae
- Genus: Petrophila
- Species: P. aengusalis

Binomial name
- Petrophila aengusalis (Schaus, 1924)

Synonyms
- Argyractis aengusalis Schaus, 1924

Species of moth

Petrophila aengusalis is a moth in the family Crambidae. It was described by William Schaus in 1924. Its type locality is Rio de Janeiro. The species was transferred from Argyractis to Petrophila in 1995.
