= Petrophila opulentalis =

Scientific classification
- Domain: Eukaryota
- Kingdom: Animalia
- Phylum: Arthropoda
- Class: Insecta
- Order: Lepidoptera
- Family: Crambidae
- Genus: Petrophila
- Species: P. opulentalis

Binomial name
- Petrophila opulentalis (Lederer, 1863)

Synonyms
- Cataclysta opulentalis Lederer, 1863; Cataclysta divisalis Walker, 1866

Species of moth

Petrophila opulentalis is a moth in the family Crambidae. It was described by Julius Lederer in 1863. It is found in the West Indies, Colombia and Brazil.
