= Petrophila amethystina =

Scientific classification
- Domain: Eukaryota
- Kingdom: Animalia
- Phylum: Arthropoda
- Class: Insecta
- Order: Lepidoptera
- Family: Crambidae
- Genus: Petrophila
- Species: P. amethystina

Binomial name
- Petrophila amethystina (Schaus, 1912)

Synonyms
- Argyractis amethystina Schaus, 1912

Species of moth

Petrophila amethystina is a moth in the family Crambidae. It was described by Schaus in 1912. It is found in Costa Rica.
