= Petrophila malcusalis =

Scientific classification
- Domain: Eukaryota
- Kingdom: Animalia
- Phylum: Arthropoda
- Class: Insecta
- Order: Lepidoptera
- Family: Crambidae
- Genus: Petrophila
- Species: P. malcusalis

Binomial name
- Petrophila malcusalis (Schaus, 1924)

Synonyms
- Argyractis malcusalis Schaus, 1924

Species of moth

Petrophila malcusalis is a moth in the family Crambidae. It was described by Schaus in 1924. It is found in the Dominican Republic.
