= Petrophila aztecalis =

Scientific classification
- Domain: Eukaryota
- Kingdom: Animalia
- Phylum: Arthropoda
- Class: Insecta
- Order: Lepidoptera
- Family: Crambidae
- Genus: Petrophila
- Species: P. aztecalis

Binomial name
- Petrophila aztecalis (Schaus, 1924)

Synonyms
- Argyractis aztecalis Schaus, 1924

Species of moth

Petrophila aztecalis is a moth in the family Crambidae. It was described by Schaus in 1924. It is found in Mexico.
