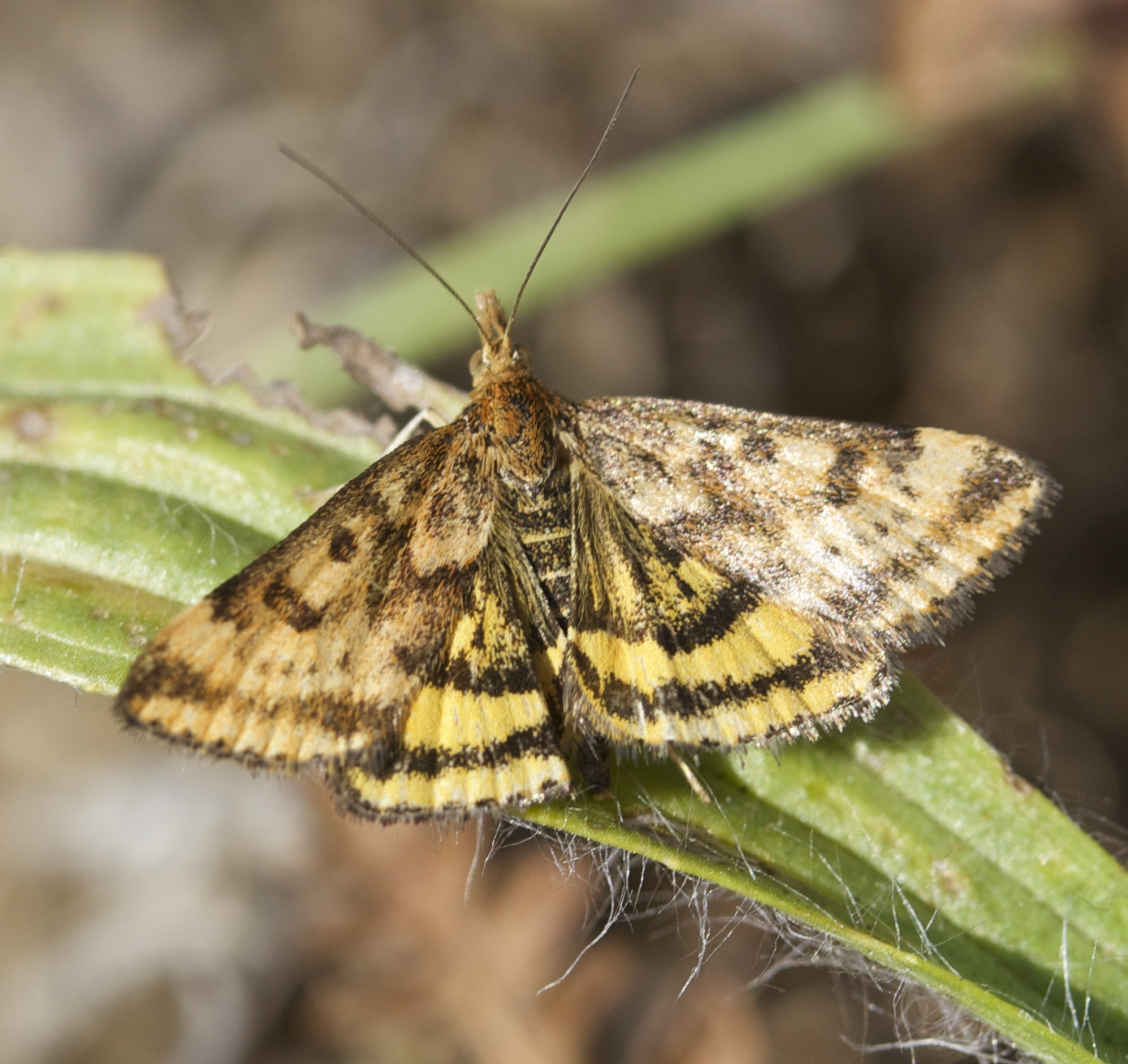

Scientific classification
- Kingdom: Animalia
- Phylum: Arthropoda
- Class: Insecta
- Order: Lepidoptera
- Family: Crambidae
- Genus: Pyrausta
- Species: P. insequalis

Binomial name
- Pyrausta insequalis (Guenée, 1854)

Synonyms
- Pyrausta subsequalis Guenée, 1854

= Pyrausta insequalis =

Species of moth

Pyrausta insequalis was a name used for a moth in the family Crambidae. It was described by Achille Guenée in 1854, with the name proposed in his appended errata as a replacement for Pyrausta subsequalis. The combination is adopted in some later works as valid (e.g. after Munroe (1995); Scholtens & Solis, 2015: 20), but later works tend to treat as a junior objective synonym of Pyrausta subsequalis, interpreted as a superfluous (unnecessary) replacement name.
