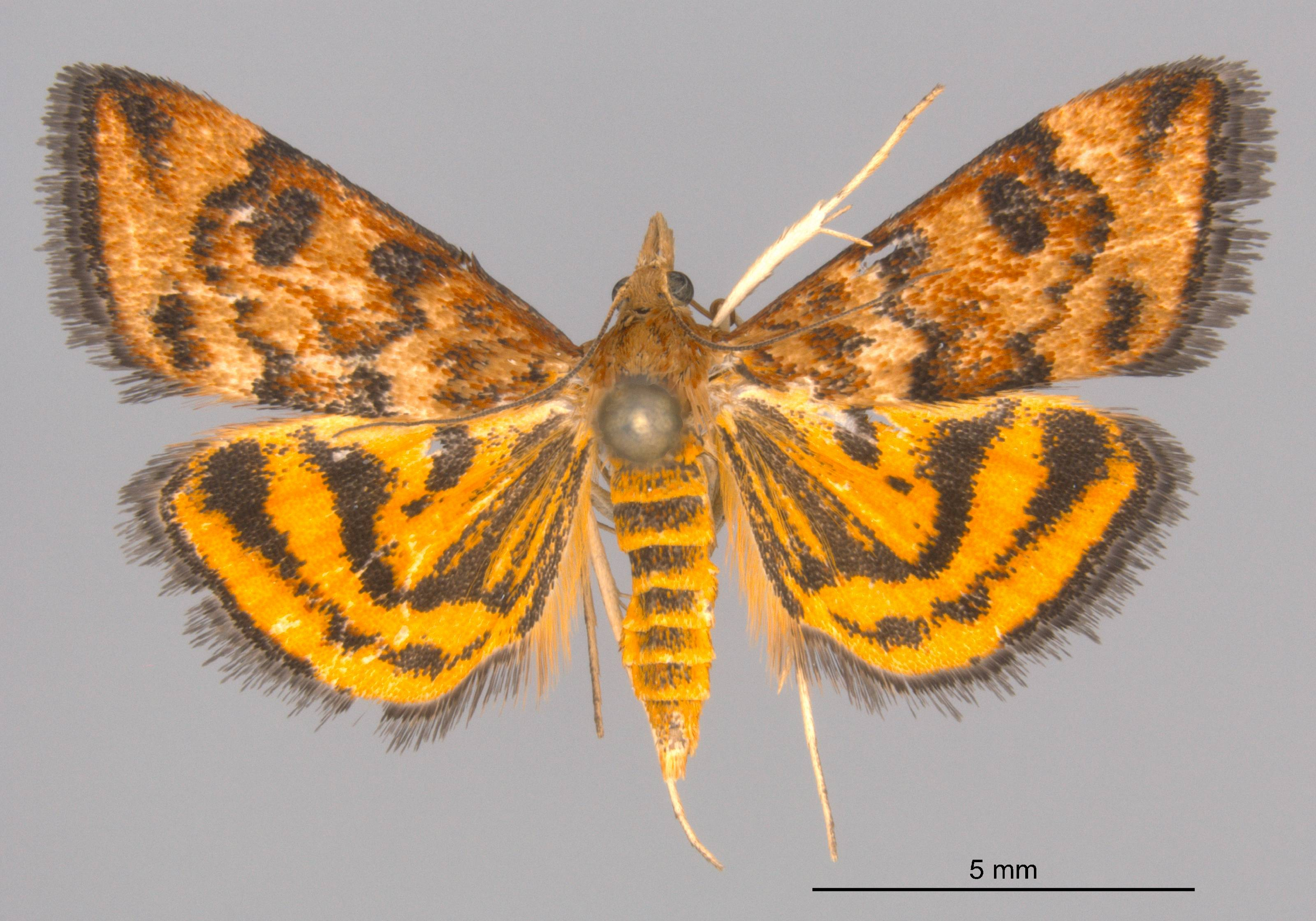

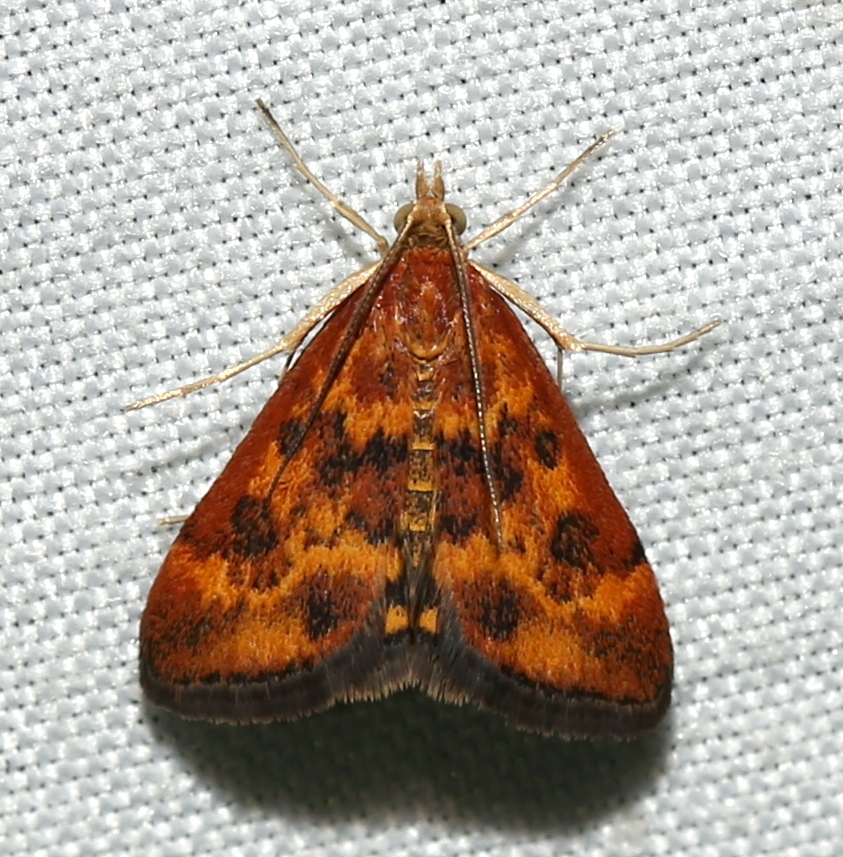

Scientific classification
- Kingdom: Animalia
- Phylum: Arthropoda
- Class: Insecta
- Order: Lepidoptera
- Family: Crambidae
- Genus: Pyrausta
- Species: P. subsequalis

Binomial name
- Pyrausta subsequalis (Guenée, 1854)

Synonyms
- Herbula subsequalis Guenée, 1854; Herbula insequalis Guenée, 1854 (Superfluous replacement name); Isopteryx madetesalis Walker, 1859; Herbula repletalis Walker, [1866]; Herbula efficitalis Walker, [1866]; Botys (Pyrausta) matronalis Grote, 1875; Botys graminalis Herrich-Schäffer, 1871; Botis subsequalis facetalis Berg, 1875

= Pyrausta subsequalis =

Species of moth

Pyrausta subsequalis, also known as the weedfield sable, is a moth in the family Crambidae. It was described by Achille Guenée in 1854. It is found in much of North America, where it has been recorded from southern Alberta and southern British Columbia south to Arizona and New Mexico and east to Florida and north to Ontario. The habitat consists of dry prairie areas.

The wingspan is 14–18 mm. Adults have been recorded on wing from July to early September. In coastal areas of California, they are seen year-round.

== Subspecies ==
- Pyrausta subsequalis subsequalis
- Pyrausta subsequalis petaluma Munroe, 1976 (California, Oregon)

== Taxonomy ==
Some uncertainty has existing in the literature in relation to the name Herbula insequalis Guenée, 1854, which was a name published in the closing section of the same original publication as an appended comment for edits and corrections as "erratum". There (p. 447), Guenée, 1854 proposed that Herbula insequalis should be used in preference to his prior name Herbula subsequalis Guenée, 1854 which had been used in his main text (p. 177). However, the stated justification for the replacement name due to the pre-existence of "subsequalis Herr.-Sch." (later Mecyna subsequalis) is not acceptable as that pre-existing name is not an homonym. Therefore, his proposed replacement name is superfluous, and becomes a junior objective synonym.
