= Mecyna submedialis =

Scientific classification
- Kingdom: Animalia
- Phylum: Arthropoda
- Class: Insecta
- Order: Lepidoptera
- Family: Crambidae
- Genus: Mecyna
- Species: M. submedialis

Binomial name
- Mecyna submedialis (Grote, 1876)

Synonyms
- Botis submedialis Grote, 1876; Botis pilalis Hulst, 1886; Botis dissectalis Grote, 1880

Species of moth

Mecyna submedialis, the orange-toned mecyna moth, is a moth in the family Crambidae. It was described by Augustus Radcliffe Grote in 1876. It is found in North America, where it has been recorded from Ontario and Michigan, south to Florida and west to Arkansas. It has also been recorded from Alberta.

The wingspan is about 25 mm. Adults have been recorded on wing from July to August.
