= Mecyna cuprinalis =

Scientific classification
- Kingdom: Animalia
- Phylum: Arthropoda
- Class: Insecta
- Order: Lepidoptera
- Family: Crambidae
- Genus: Mecyna
- Species: M. cuprinalis

Binomial name
- Mecyna cuprinalis (Ragonot, 1895)

Synonyms
- Pyrausta cuprinalis Ragonot, 1895; Pyrausta pistorialis Zerny, 1934

Species of moth

Mecyna cuprinalis is a moth in the family Crambidae. It was described by Ragonot in 1895. It is found in Lebanon and Turkey.
