= Mecyna tapa =

Scientific classification
- Kingdom: Animalia
- Phylum: Arthropoda
- Class: Insecta
- Order: Lepidoptera
- Family: Crambidae
- Genus: Mecyna
- Species: M. tapa

Binomial name
- Mecyna tapa (Strand, 1918)

Synonyms
- Pyrausta tapa Strand, 1918

Species of moth

Mecyna tapa is a moth in the family Crambidae. It was described by Strand in 1918. It is found in Taiwan.
