= Mecyna luteofluvalis =

Scientific classification
- Kingdom: Animalia
- Phylum: Arthropoda
- Class: Insecta
- Order: Lepidoptera
- Family: Crambidae
- Genus: Mecyna
- Species: M. luteofluvalis

Binomial name
- Mecyna luteofluvalis Mutuura, 1954

Species of moth

Mecyna luteofluvalis is a moth in the family Crambidae. It was described by Akira Mutuura in 1954. It is found in Honshu, Japan.
