= Mecyna atlanticum =

Scientific classification
- Kingdom: Animalia
- Phylum: Arthropoda
- Class: Insecta
- Order: Lepidoptera
- Family: Crambidae
- Genus: Mecyna
- Species: M. atlanticum

Binomial name
- Mecyna atlanticum (Bethune-Baker, 1894)

Synonyms
- Botys atlanticum Bethune-Baker, 1894

Species of moth

Mecyna atlanticum is a species of moth in the family Crambidae. It is found on the Canary Islands and Madeira.

The wingspan is about 33 mm. The forewings are pale ochreous grey with two small dark grey dots and one bigger spot. The hindwings are darker grey with a dark grey border.
