= Mecyna bandiamiralis =

Scientific classification
- Kingdom: Animalia
- Phylum: Arthropoda
- Class: Insecta
- Order: Lepidoptera
- Family: Crambidae
- Genus: Mecyna
- Species: M. bandiamiralis

Binomial name
- Mecyna bandiamiralis Amsel, 1970

Species of moth

Mecyna bandiamiralis is a moth in the family Crambidae. It was described by Hans Georg Amsel in 1970 and is found in Afghanistan.
