= Mecyna mauretanica =

Scientific classification
- Kingdom: Animalia
- Phylum: Arthropoda
- Class: Insecta
- Order: Lepidoptera
- Family: Crambidae
- Genus: Mecyna
- Species: M. mauretanica

Binomial name
- Mecyna mauretanica Slamka, 2013

Species of moth

Mecyna mauretanica is a moth in the family Crambidae. It was described by Slamka in 2013 and is found in Morocco.
