= Mecyna arroundella =

Scientific classification
- Kingdom: Animalia
- Phylum: Arthropoda
- Class: Insecta
- Order: Lepidoptera
- Family: Crambidae
- Genus: Mecyna
- Species: M. arroundella

Binomial name
- Mecyna arroundella (Schmidt, 1934)

Synonyms
- Pyrausta arroundella Schmidt, 1934

Species of moth

Mecyna arroundella is a moth in the family Crambidae. It was described by Schmidt in 1934. It is found in Morocco.
