= Mecyna tricolor =

Scientific classification
- Kingdom: Animalia
- Phylum: Arthropoda
- Class: Insecta
- Order: Lepidoptera
- Family: Crambidae
- Genus: Mecyna
- Species: M. tricolor

Binomial name
- Mecyna tricolor (Butler, 1879)

Synonyms
- Hymenia tricolor Butler, 1879; Uresiphita tricolor

Species of moth

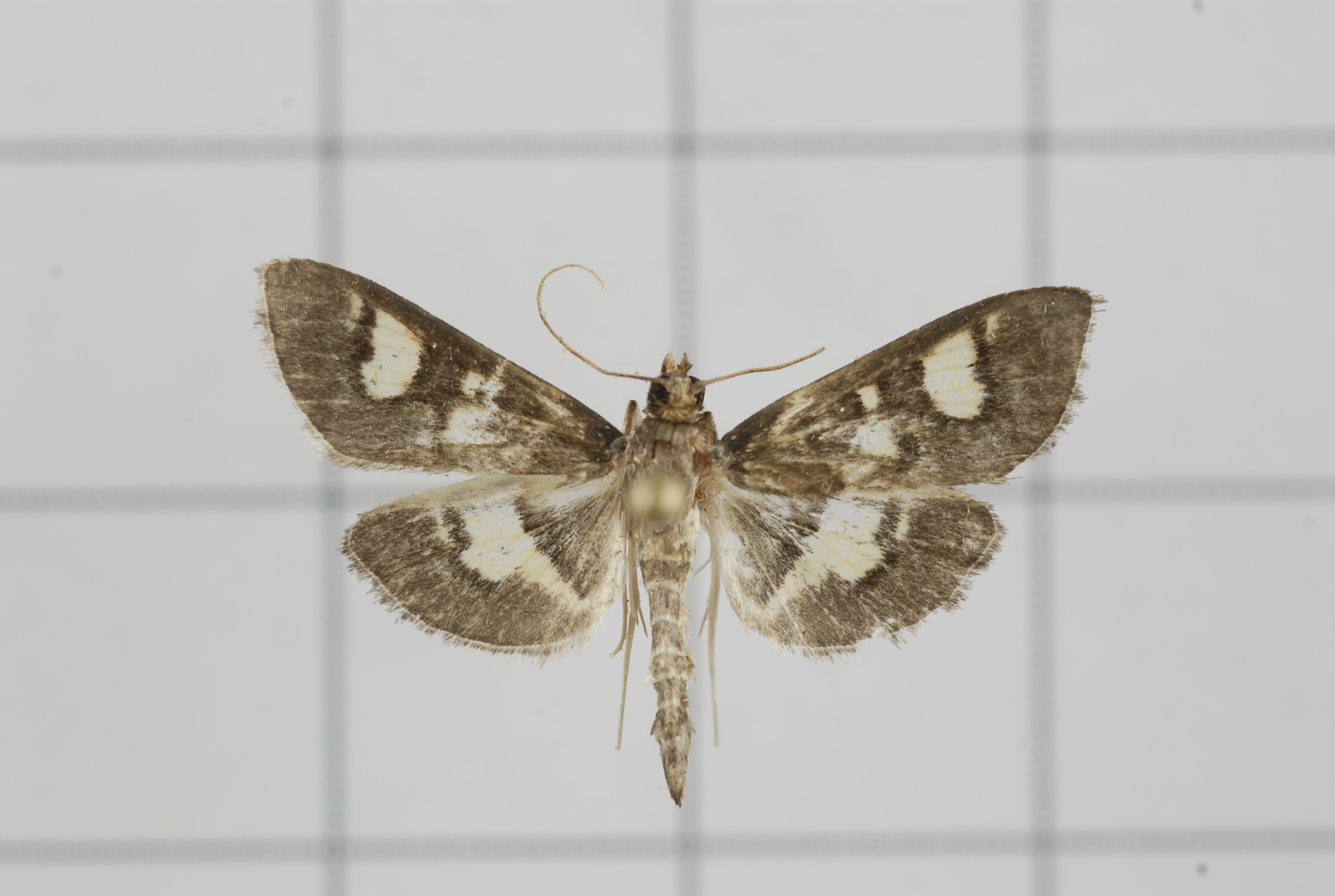

Mecyna tricolor is a moth in the family Crambidae. It was described by Arthur Gardiner Butler in 1879. It is found in Japan, Taiwan, China and Russia.

The wingspan is 22–25 mm.
