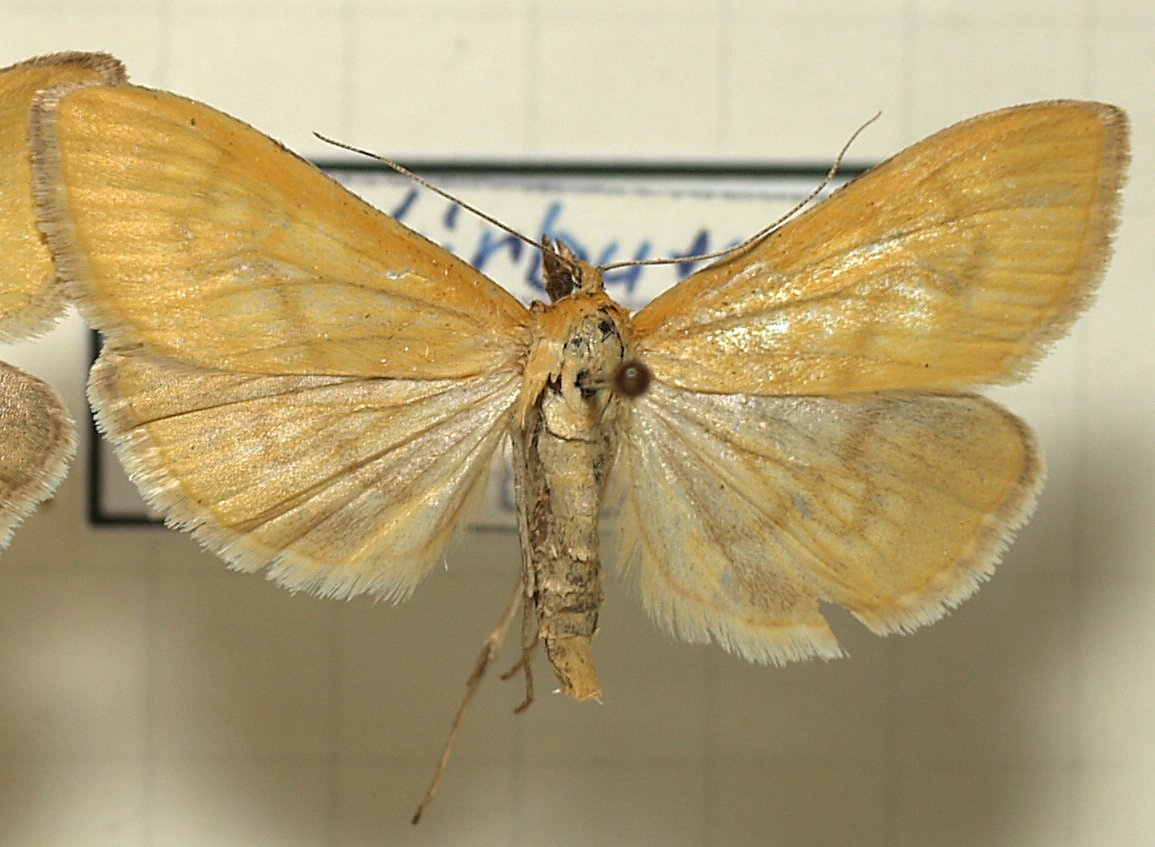

Scientific classification
- Kingdom: Animalia
- Phylum: Arthropoda
- Class: Insecta
- Order: Lepidoptera
- Family: Crambidae
- Genus: Mecyna
- Species: M. lutealis

Binomial name
- Mecyna lutealis (Duponchel, 1833)

Synonyms
- Botys lutealis Duponchel, 1833; Botys citralis var. albarracinensis Fuchs, 1901; Botys flavalis var. citralis Herrich-Schäffer, 1848; Botys flavalis (Villers, 1789); Pyrausta lutealis gomagoialis Amsel, 1932; Mecyna lutealis rungsalis (Leraut, 2005)

= Mecyna lutealis =

Species of moth

Mecyna lutealis is a species of moth of the family Crambidae. It is found in large parts of Europe, including Spain, France, Belgium, Germany, Switzerland, Austria, Italy, Romania, Bulgaria, North Macedonia, Albania and Greece. The species was first described by Philogène Auguste Joseph Duponchel in 1833.
