= Mecyna quinquigera =

Scientific classification
- Kingdom: Animalia
- Phylum: Arthropoda
- Clade: Pancrustacea
- Class: Insecta
- Order: Lepidoptera
- Family: Crambidae
- Genus: Mecyna
- Species: M. quinquigera

Binomial name
- Mecyna quinquigera (Moore, 1888)

Synonyms
- Samea quinquigera Moore, 1888; Uresiphita quinquigera

Species of moth

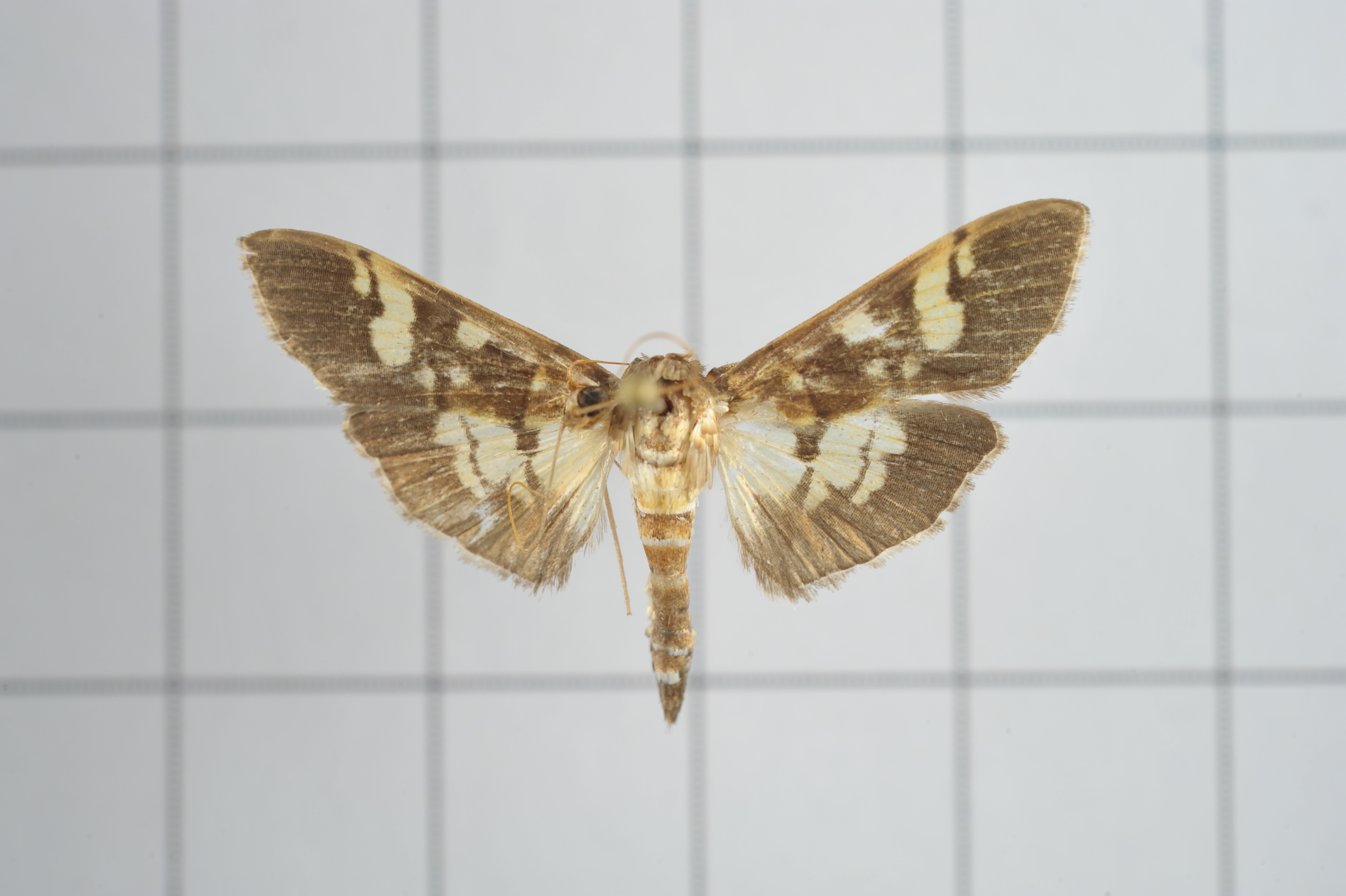

Mecyna quinquigera is a moth in the family Crambidae. It was described by Frederic Moore in 1888. It is found in China, Japan and Taiwan.
