= Mecyna luscitialis =

Scientific classification
- Kingdom: Animalia
- Phylum: Arthropoda
- Clade: Pancrustacea
- Class: Insecta
- Order: Lepidoptera
- Family: Crambidae
- Genus: Mecyna
- Species: M. luscitialis

Binomial name
- Mecyna luscitialis (Barnes & McDunnough, 1914)

Synonyms
- Pyrausta luscitialis Barnes & McDunnough, 1914; Pyrausta luscitalis Munroe, 1995

Species of moth

Mecyna luscitialis is a moth in the family Crambidae. It was described by William Barnes and James Halliday McDunnough in 1914. It is found in North America, where it has been recorded from Arizona, California and Nevada.
