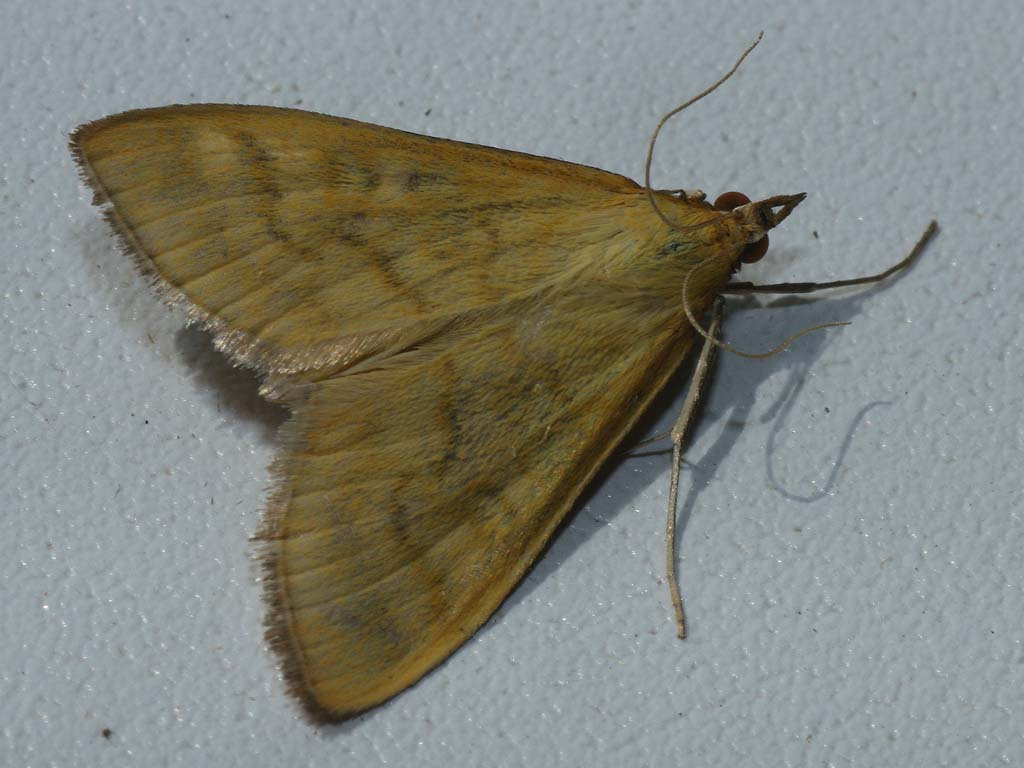

Scientific classification
- Kingdom: Animalia
- Phylum: Arthropoda
- Class: Insecta
- Order: Lepidoptera
- Family: Crambidae
- Genus: Mecyna
- Species: M. flavalis

Binomial name
- Mecyna flavalis (Denis & Schiffermuller, 1775)

Synonyms
- Pyralis flavalis Denis & Schiffermuller, 1775; Uresiphita flavalis; Mecyna fluvalis Mutuura, 1954; Mecyna luteoflavalis Mutuura, 1954; Pyrausta flavalis var. cuencalis Caradja, 1916; Pyrausta flaviculalis Caradja, 1916; Pyrausta paludalis Rougemont, 1906

= Mecyna flavalis =

Species of moth

Mecyna flavalis is a species of moth in the family Crambidae. It is known from most of Europe (except Ireland, Norway, Portugal, Slovenia and Ukraine) to Japan. The species was first described by Michael Denis and Ignaz Schiffermüller in 1775.

The wingspan is 25–29 mm. Adults are on wing from July to August.

The larvae feed on Galium mollugo, Artemisia campestris, Ballota, Reseda and Urtica urens.
