= Mecyna gracilis =

Scientific classification
- Kingdom: Animalia
- Phylum: Arthropoda
- Class: Insecta
- Order: Lepidoptera
- Family: Crambidae
- Genus: Mecyna
- Species: M. gracilis

Binomial name
- Mecyna gracilis (Butler, 1879)

Synonyms
- Samea gracilis Butler, 1879; Uresiphita gracilis; Botys explicatalis Christoph, 1881; Pyrausta gracilis meridionalis Caradja & Meyrick, 1934

Species of moth

Mecyna gracilis is a moth in the family Crambidae. It was described by Arthur Gardiner Butler in 1879. It is found in the Russian Far East, Japan, Taiwan and China.

The wingspan is 20–24 mm.
