= Mecyna indistinctalis =

Scientific classification
- Kingdom: Animalia
- Phylum: Arthropoda
- Class: Insecta
- Order: Lepidoptera
- Family: Crambidae
- Genus: Mecyna
- Species: M. indistinctalis

Binomial name
- Mecyna indistinctalis Amsel, 1961

Species of moth

Mecyna indistinctalis is a moth in the family Crambidae. It was first described in 1961. It is found in Iran.
