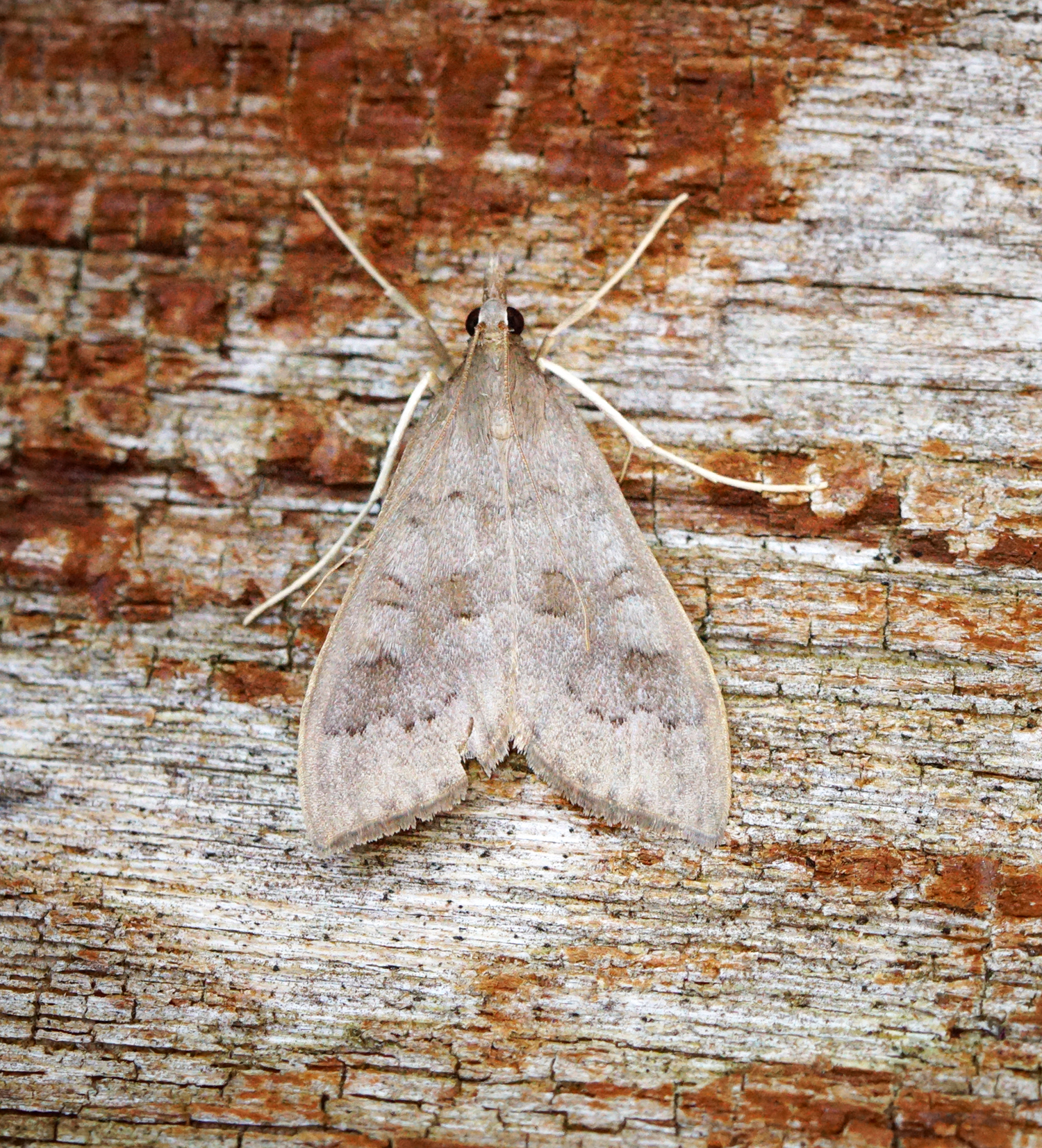

Scientific classification
- Kingdom: Animalia
- Phylum: Arthropoda
- Clade: Pancrustacea
- Class: Insecta
- Order: Lepidoptera
- Family: Crambidae
- Genus: Mecyna
- Species: M. asinalis

Binomial name
- Mecyna asinalis (Hübner, 1819)

Synonyms
- Pyralis asinalis Hübner, 1819; Mecyna characteralis Freyer, 1848; Pyrausta asinalis ab. obsoletalis Schawerda, 1926

= Mecyna asinalis =

Species of moth

Mecyna asinalis, sometimes known as the madder pearl, is a species of moth of the family Crambidae found in Europe.

== Description ==
The wingspan is 25–29 millimetres (0.98–1.14 in). The forewings are grey; lines darker, first indistinct, sometimes followed by a dark fuscous triangular subdorsal spot, second sometimes blackish -dotted, curved, with a deep abrupt sinuation inwards below middle, often preceded by a brownish or dark fuscous trapezoidal subdorsal spot; very large orbicular, and reniform discal spot somewhat paler, latter preceded and followed by faint brownish sometimes dark-edged spots. Hind are wings grey; a darker postmedian line. The larva is yellow-brownish; dorsal line reddish-brown; subdorsal broader, brown; lateral brown; spots black.

The moth flies from May to October in two generations per year.

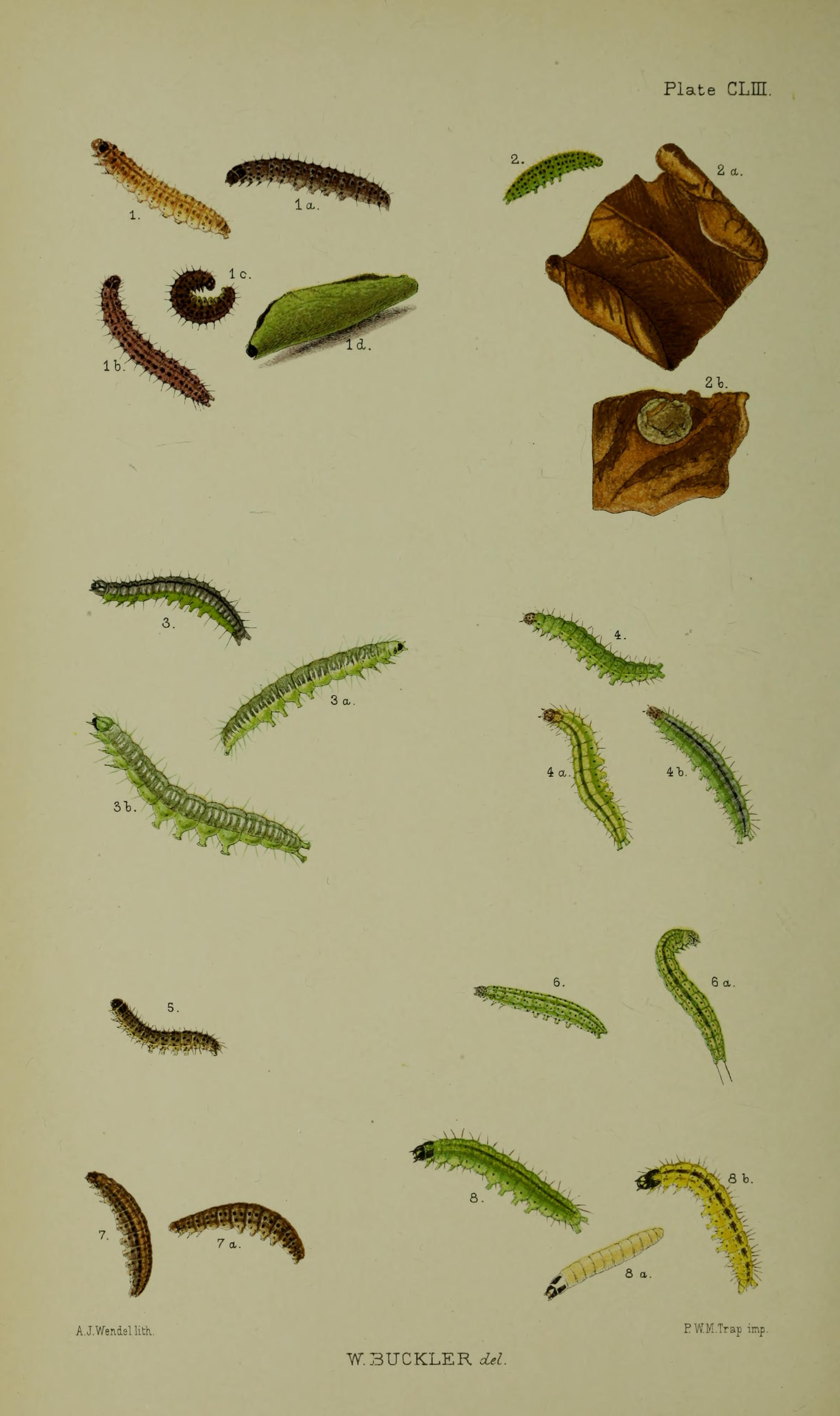
Figs 7, 7a larva after final moult

The larvae graze the leaves of the foodplant eating the parenchyma and leaving a ″window″ in the upper epidermis. Foodplants include taupata (Coprosma repens), crosswort (Crucianella maritima) and wild madder (Rubia peregrina).

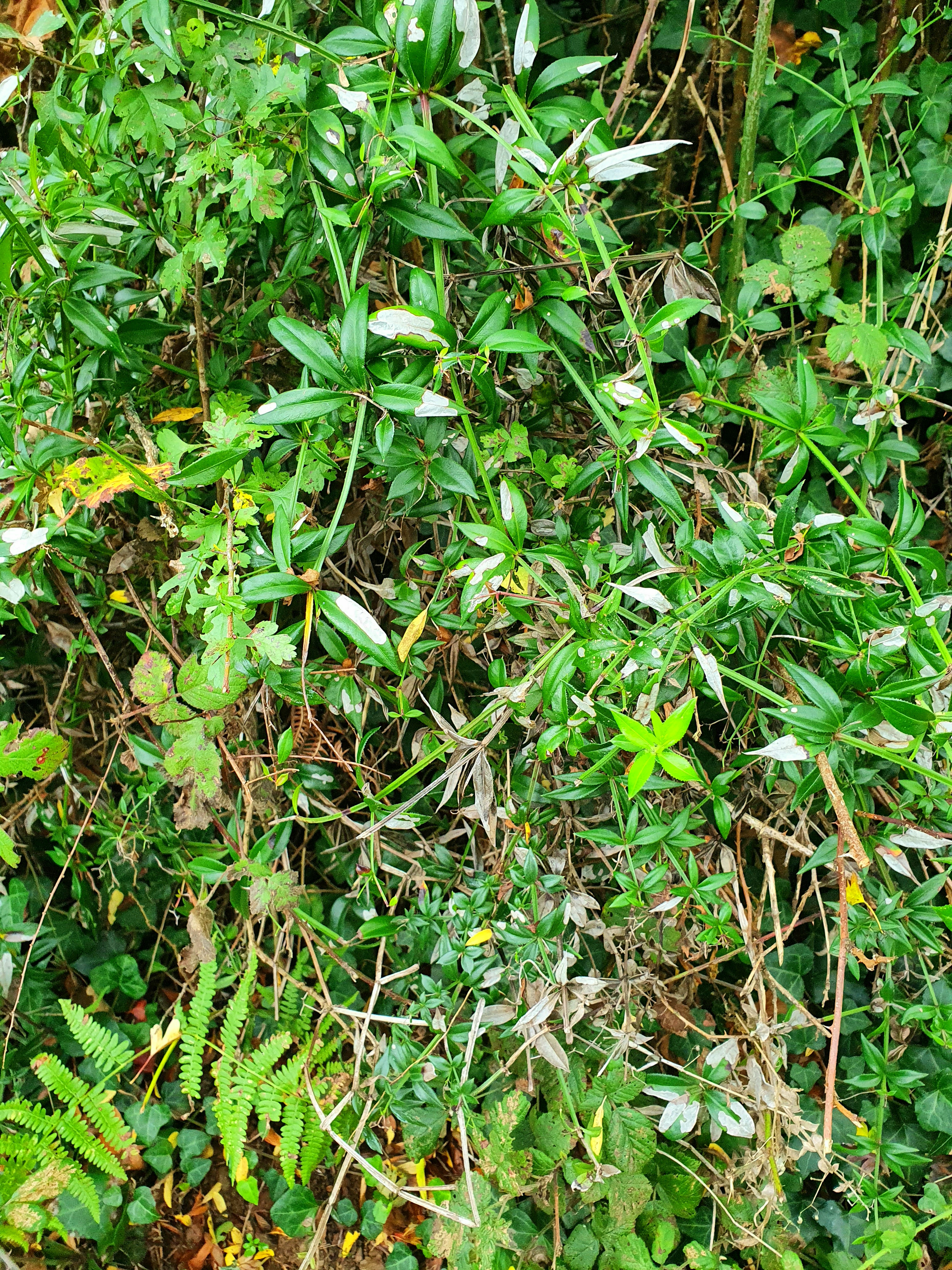
Larval feeding signs on wild madder

== Distribution ==
It is found in west and southern Europe, including Ireland, Britain, the Iberian Peninsula, France, Germany, Switzerland, Italy, Albania, Croatia, Greece and Sicily, Sardinia, Malta, Madeira, Corsica, the Azores and the Canary Islands.
