= Mecyna asiaticalis =

Scientific classification
- Kingdom: Animalia
- Phylum: Arthropoda
- Class: Insecta
- Order: Lepidoptera
- Family: Crambidae
- Genus: Mecyna
- Species: M. asiaticalis

Binomial name
- Mecyna asiaticalis (Caradja, 1916)

Synonyms
- Pyrausta asiaticalis Caradja, 1916

Species of moth

Mecyna asiaticalis is a moth in the family Crambidae. It was described by Aristide Caradja in 1916. It is found in Turkmenistan and Kyrgyzstan.
