= Mecyna fuscimaculalis =

Scientific classification
- Kingdom: Animalia
- Phylum: Arthropoda
- Class: Insecta
- Order: Lepidoptera
- Family: Crambidae
- Genus: Mecyna
- Species: M. fuscimaculalis

Binomial name
- Mecyna fuscimaculalis (Grote, 1878)

Synonyms
- Botis fuscimaculalis Grote, 1878; Botis confovealis Hulst, 1886; Botis flavicoloralis Grote, 1878

Species of moth

Mecyna fuscimaculalis is a moth in the family Crambidae. It was described by Augustus Radcliffe Grote in 1878. It is found in North America, where it has been recorded from Texas and Alberta.
