= Mecyna micalis =

Scientific classification
- Kingdom: Animalia
- Phylum: Arthropoda
- Class: Insecta
- Order: Lepidoptera
- Family: Crambidae
- Genus: Mecyna
- Species: M. micalis

Binomial name
- Mecyna micalis (Caradja, 1916)

Synonyms
- Pyrausta micalis Caradja, 1916

Species of moth

Mecyna micalis is a moth in the family Crambidae. It was described by Aristide Caradja in 1916. It is found in Kazakhstan.
