= Mecyna marioni =

Scientific classification
- Kingdom: Animalia
- Phylum: Arthropoda
- Class: Insecta
- Order: Lepidoptera
- Family: Crambidae
- Genus: Mecyna
- Species: M. marioni

Binomial name
- Mecyna marioni Amsel, 1957

Species of moth

Mecyna marioni is a moth in the family Crambidae. It was described by Hans Georg Amsel in 1957 and is found in Uzbekistan.
