= Mecyna marcidalis =

Scientific classification
- Kingdom: Animalia
- Phylum: Arthropoda
- Class: Insecta
- Order: Lepidoptera
- Family: Crambidae
- Genus: Mecyna
- Species: M. marcidalis

Binomial name
- Mecyna marcidalis (Fuchs, 1879)

Synonyms
- Botys trinalis var. marcidalis Fuchs, 1879; Botys amasialis Staudinger, 1880; Botys trinalis var. pontica Staudinger, 1879; Mecyna syriacalis Marion, 1955; Pyrausta levilinealis Amsel, 1935; Botys designatalis Christoph in Romanoff, 1887; Pyrausta lutalbalis Caradja, 1916

Species of moth

Mecyna marcidalis is a species of moth in the family Crambidae. It is found in France, Azerbaijan, as well as the Near East, including Turkey, Syria, Iran and the Palestinian territories.
