= Mecyna sefidalis =

Scientific classification
- Kingdom: Animalia
- Phylum: Arthropoda
- Class: Insecta
- Order: Lepidoptera
- Family: Crambidae
- Genus: Mecyna
- Species: M. sefidalis

Binomial name
- Mecyna sefidalis (Amsel, 1950)

Synonyms
- Pyrausta sefidalis Amsel, 1950

Species of moth

Mecyna sefidalis is a moth in the family Crambidae. It was described by Hans Georg Amsel in 1950 and is found in Iran.
