= Mecyna auralis =

Scientific classification
- Kingdom: Animalia
- Phylum: Arthropoda
- Class: Insecta
- Order: Lepidoptera
- Family: Crambidae
- Genus: Mecyna
- Species: M. auralis

Binomial name
- Mecyna auralis (Peyerimhoff, 1872)

Synonyms
- Botys auralis Peyerimhoff, 1872; Botys trinalis var. bornicensis Fuchs, 1876

Species of moth

Mecyna auralis is a species of moth in the family Crambidae. It is found in Germany, France and Spain.
