= Mecyna prunipennis =

Scientific classification
- Kingdom: Animalia
- Phylum: Arthropoda
- Class: Insecta
- Order: Lepidoptera
- Family: Crambidae
- Genus: Mecyna
- Species: M. prunipennis

Binomial name
- Mecyna prunipennis Butler, 1879

Synonyms
- Uresiphita prunipennis

Species of moth

Mecyna prunipennis is a moth in the family Crambidae. It was described by Arthur Gardiner Butler in 1879. It is found in Japan.

The wingspan is about 13 mm. The forewings are reddish brown, tinged with plum colour and with a greyish spot at the end of the cell. The hindwings are dirty ochreous, with a grey external border.
