= Mecyna trinalis =

Scientific classification
- Kingdom: Animalia
- Phylum: Arthropoda
- Class: Insecta
- Order: Lepidoptera
- Family: Crambidae
- Genus: Mecyna
- Species: M. trinalis

Binomial name
- Mecyna trinalis (Denis & Schiffermuller, 1775)

Synonyms
- Pyralis trinalis Denis & Schiffermuller, 1775; Pyralis trinalis var. anienalis Hartig, 1941; Mecyna (Pyrausta) lutealis maroccanensis Amsel, 1956; Mecyna joannisalis Marion, 1955; Botys trinalis var. andalusica Staudinger, 1879; Mecyna andalusica; Botys flavalis var. tripunctalis Oberthür, 1887

Species of moth

Mecyna trinalis is a species of moth in the family Crambidae. It is found in France, Spain, Italy, Austria, the Czech Republic, Slovakia, Poland, Hungary, the Balkan Peninsula, Ukraine, Russia, Turkey and North Africa, including Algeria and Morocco.

The wingspan is about 23-27 mm.

The larvae feed on Helianthemum species.
