= Mecyna suffusalis =

Scientific classification
- Kingdom: Animalia
- Phylum: Arthropoda
- Class: Insecta
- Order: Lepidoptera
- Family: Crambidae
- Genus: Mecyna
- Species: M. suffusalis

Binomial name
- Mecyna suffusalis (Warren, 1892)

Synonyms
- Prionopaltis suffusalis Warren, 1892; Uresiphita suffusalis

Species of moth

Mecyna suffusalis is a moth in the family Crambidae. It was described by Warren in 1892. It is found in Japan.

The wingspan is 26–27 mm.
