= Mecyna cocosica =

Scientific classification
- Kingdom: Animalia
- Phylum: Arthropoda
- Class: Insecta
- Order: Lepidoptera
- Family: Crambidae
- Genus: Mecyna
- Species: M. cocosica

Binomial name
- Mecyna cocosica Munroe, 1959

Species of moth

Mecyna cocosica is a moth in the family Crambidae. It was described by Eugene G. Munroe in 1959. It is found in Costa Rica, where it was described from Cocos Island.
