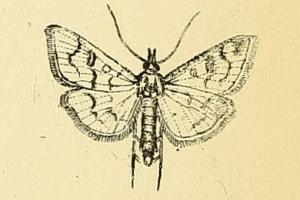

Scientific classification
- Kingdom: Animalia
- Phylum: Arthropoda
- Class: Insecta
- Order: Lepidoptera
- Family: Crambidae
- Genus: Mecyna
- Species: M. biternalis

Binomial name
- Mecyna biternalis (Mann, 1862)

Synonyms
- Botys biternalis Mann, 1862; Pyrausta intermedialis Caradja, 1916

= Mecyna biternalis =

Species of moth

Mecyna biternalis is a species of moth in the family Crambidae. It is found in Bulgaria and Turkey.
