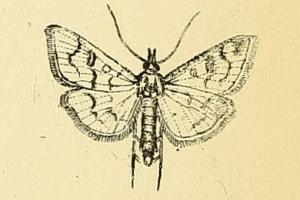
- Mecyna biternalis

Scientific classification
- Kingdom: Animalia
- Phylum: Arthropoda
- Class: Insecta
- Order: Lepidoptera
- Family: Crambidae
- Subfamily: Spilomelinae
- Genus: Mecyna; Doubleday, 1849

= Mecyna =

Genus of moths

Mecyna is a genus of moths of the family Crambidae. The genus was first described by Henry Doubleday in 1849.

== Species ==
- Mecyna albalis Amsel, 1961
- Mecyna arroundella (Schmidt, 1934)
- Mecyna asiaticalis (Caradja, 1916)
- Mecyna asinalis (Hübner, 1819)
- Mecyna atlanticum (Bethune-Baker, 1894)
- Mecyna auralis (Peyerimhoff, 1872)
- Mecyna babalis Amsel, 1970
- Mecyna bandiamiralis Amsel, 1970
- Mecyna biternalis (Mann, 1862)
- Mecyna cocosica Munroe, 1959
- Mecyna cuprinalis Ragonot, 1895
- Mecyna flavalis (Denis & Schiffermüller, 1775)
- Mecyna fuscimaculalis (Grote, 1878)
- Mecyna gracilis (Butler, 1879)
- Mecyna grisealis Amsel, 1961
- Mecyna indistinctalis Amsel, 1961
- Mecyna luscitialis (Barnes & McDunnough, 1914)
- Mecyna lutealis (Duponchel, 1833)
- Mecyna luteofluvalis Mutuura, 1954
- Mecyna marcidalis (Fuchs, 1879)
- Mecyna marioni Amsel, 1957
- Mecyna mauretanica Slamka, 2013
- Mecyna micalis (Caradja, 1916)
- Mecyna mustelinalis (Packard, 1873)
- Mecyna procillusalis (Walker, 1859)
- Mecyna prunipennis Butler, 1879
- Mecyna quinquigera (Moore, 1888)
- Mecyna salangalis Amsel, 1970
- Mecyna sefidalis (Amsel, 1950)
- Mecyna submedialis (Grote, 1876)
- Mecyna subsequalis (Herrich-Schäffer, 1843-1856)
- Mecyna suffusalis (Warren, 1892)
- Mecyna tapa (Strand, 1918)
- Mecyna tricolor (Butler, 1879)
- Mecyna trinalis (Denis & Schiffermüller, 1775)

== Former species ==
- Mecyna andalusica (Staudinger, 1879)
- Mecyna catalalis Viette, 1953
- Mecyna lutalbalis (Caradja, 1916)
- Mecyna lutulentalis (Lederer, 1858)
- Mecyna pistorialis (Zerny, 1934)
