= Mecyna albalis =

Scientific classification
- Kingdom: Animalia
- Phylum: Arthropoda
- Class: Insecta
- Order: Lepidoptera
- Family: Crambidae
- Genus: Mecyna
- Species: M. albalis

Binomial name
- Mecyna albalis Amsel, 1961

Species of moth

Mecyna albalis is a moth in the family Crambidae. It was described by Hans Georg Amsel in 1961 and is found in Iran.
