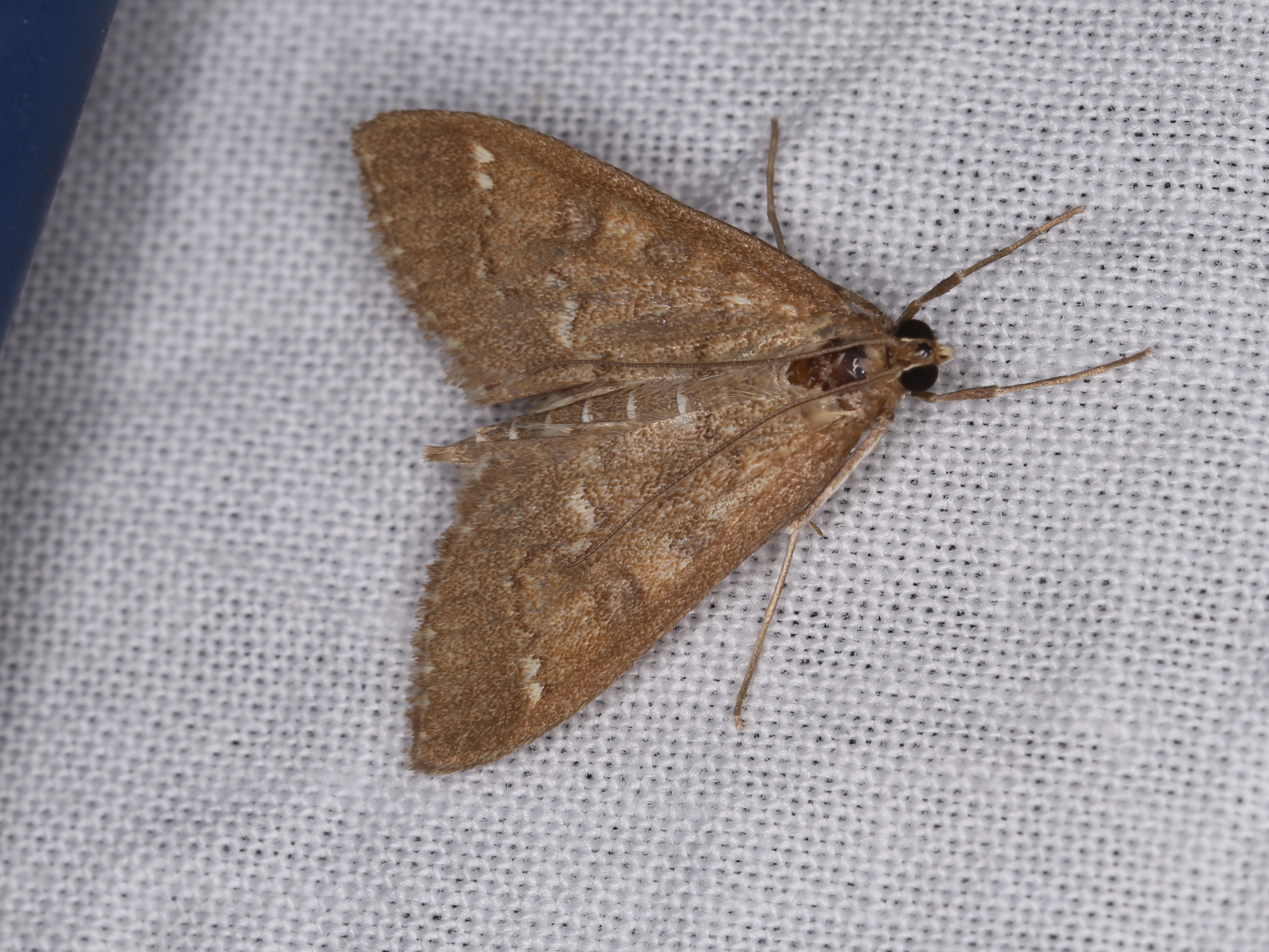
- Mecyna mustelinalis

Scientific classification
- Kingdom: Animalia
- Phylum: Arthropoda
- Clade: Pancrustacea
- Class: Insecta
- Order: Lepidoptera
- Family: Crambidae
- Genus: Mecyna
- Species: M. mustelinalis

Binomial name
- Mecyna mustelinalis (Packard, 1873)

Synonyms
- Botys mustelinalis Packard, 1873; Botis catenulalis Grote, 1877; Botis monulalis Hulst, 1886

= Mecyna mustelinalis =

Species of moth

Mecyna mustelinalis is a moth in the family Crambidae. It was described by Packard in 1873. It is found in North America, where it has been recorded from Alberta, Arizona, British Columbia, California, Manitoba, Montana, Nevada, Saskatchewan, Utah, Washington and Yukon.

The length of the forewings is 12.5–16.5 mm. Adults have been recorded on wing from March to August, with most records from July.
