= Mecyna subsequalis =

Scientific classification
- Kingdom: Animalia
- Phylum: Arthropoda
- Class: Insecta
- Order: Lepidoptera
- Family: Crambidae
- Genus: Mecyna
- Species: M. subsequalis

Binomial name
- Mecyna subsequalis (Herrich-Schaffer, 1851)

Synonyms
- Botys subsequalis Herrich-Schaffer, 1851; Pyrausta consequens Meyrick, 1932; Botys subsequalis lutulentalis Lederer, 1858

Species of moth

Mecyna subsequalis is a species of moth in the family Crambidae. It is found in Bulgaria, Greece, Russia and Syria.
