= Vaxi obliqua =

Scientific classification
- Kingdom: Animalia
- Phylum: Arthropoda
- Class: Insecta
- Order: Lepidoptera
- Family: Crambidae
- Subfamily: Crambinae
- Tribe: Calamotrophini
- Genus: Vaxi
- Species: V. obliqua

Binomial name
- Vaxi obliqua (Hampson, 1919)

Synonyms
- Conocrambus obliqua Hampson, 1919

Species of moth

Vaxi obliqua is a moth in the family Crambidae. It was described by George Hampson in 1919. It is found in Brazil's Amazon region.
