= Vaxi jonesella =

Scientific classification
- Kingdom: Animalia
- Phylum: Arthropoda
- Clade: Pancrustacea
- Class: Insecta
- Order: Lepidoptera
- Family: Crambidae
- Subfamily: Crambinae
- Tribe: Calamotrophini
- Genus: Vaxi
- Species: V. jonesella

Binomial name
- Vaxi jonesella (Dyar, 1913)

Synonyms
- Argyria jonesella Dyar, 1913

Species of moth

Vaxi jonesella is a moth in the family Crambidae. It was described by Harrison Gray Dyar Jr. in 1913. It is found in Paraná, Brazil.
