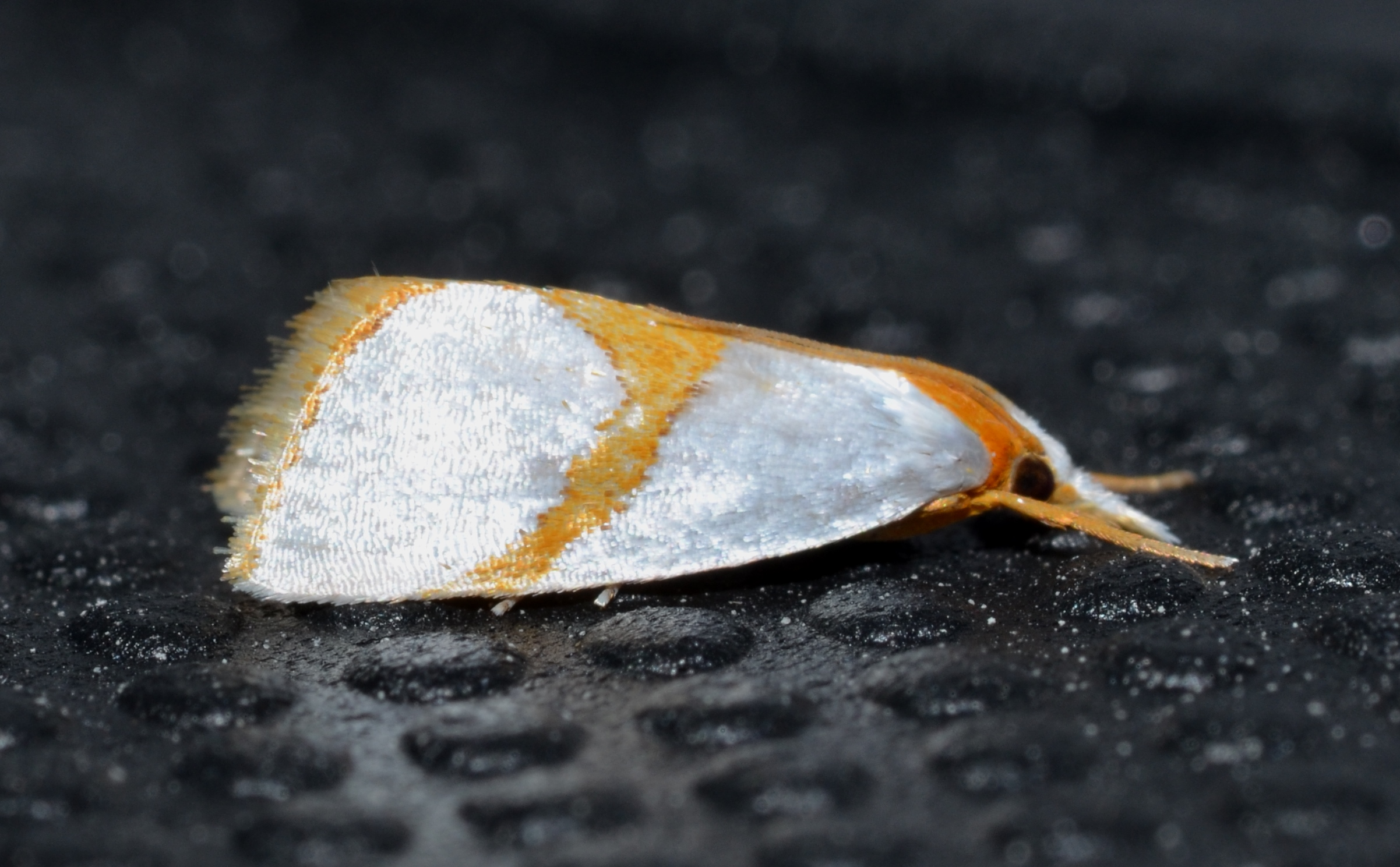

Scientific classification
- Kingdom: Animalia
- Phylum: Arthropoda
- Clade: Pancrustacea
- Class: Insecta
- Order: Lepidoptera
- Family: Crambidae
- Subfamily: Crambinae
- Tribe: Calamotrophini
- Genus: Vaxi
- Species: V. auratellus

Binomial name
- Vaxi auratellus (Clemens, 1860)

Synonyms
- Crambus auratellus Clemens, 1860; Argyria auratella; Urola pulchella Walker, 1863

= Vaxi auratellus =

Species of moth

Vaxi auratellus, the curve-lined vaxi or curve-lined argyria moth, is a moth in the family Crambidae. It was described by James Brackenridge Clemens in 1860. It is found in North America, where it has been recorded from the eastern United States and south-eastern Canada from Quebec and Maine to Florida, west to Texas and north to Manitoba. It is also found in California.

The wingspan is 15–18 mm. Adults are on wing from March to July in the southern part of the range and from June to August in the north.
