= Vaxi =

Scientific classification
- Kingdom: Animalia
- Phylum: Arthropoda
- Class: Insecta
- Order: Lepidoptera
- Family: Crambidae
- Subfamily: Crambinae
- Tribe: Calamotrophini
- Genus: Vaxi; Bleszynski, 1962

Genus of moths

Vaxi is a genus of moths of the family Crambidae.

== Species ==
- Vaxi auratellus (Clemens, 1860
- Vaxi critica Forbes, 1920
- Vaxi jonesella (Dyar, 1913
- Vaxi obliqua (Hampson, 1919
- Vaxi tripsacas (Dyar, 1921)
