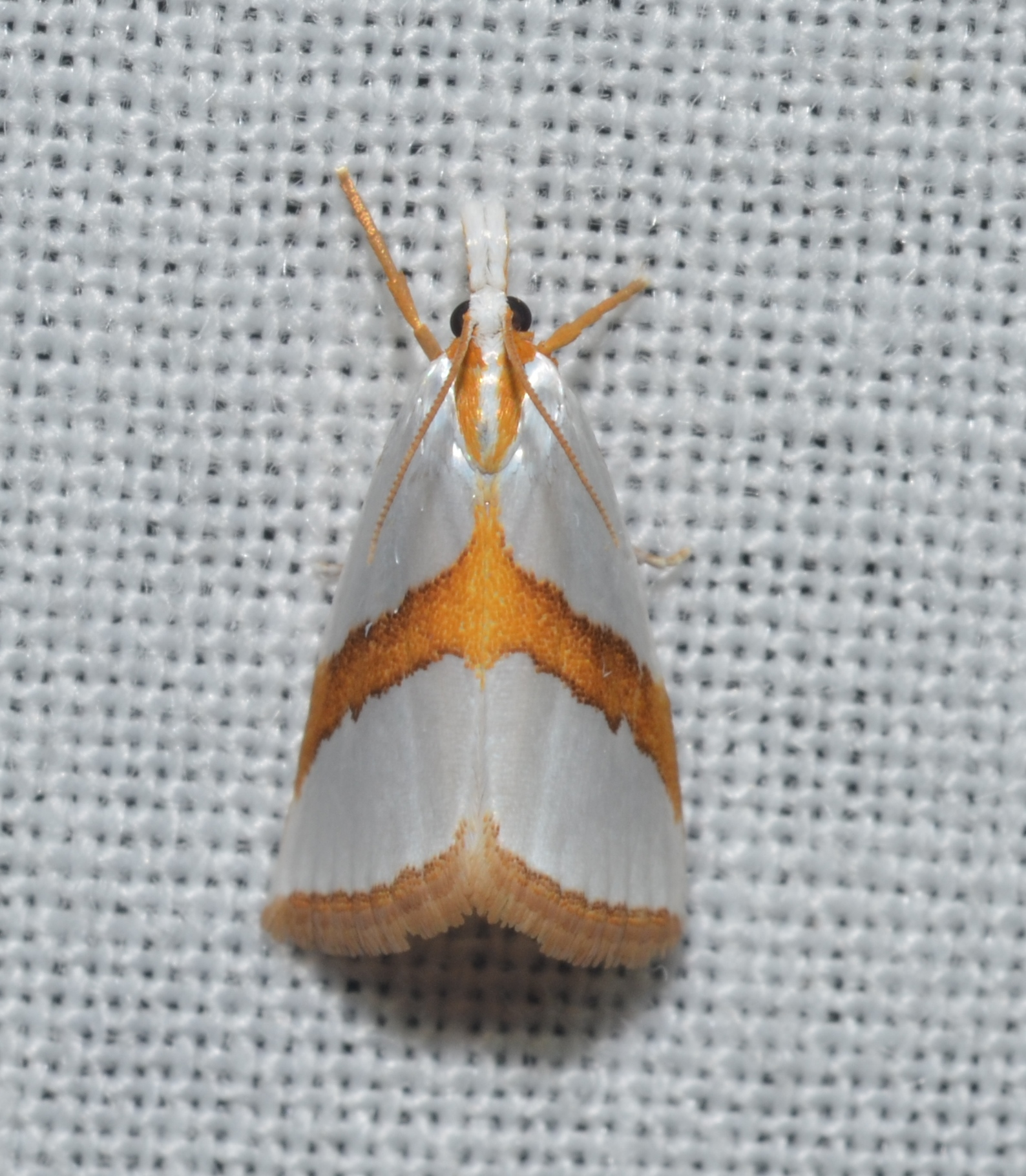

Scientific classification
- Kingdom: Animalia
- Phylum: Arthropoda
- Clade: Pancrustacea
- Class: Insecta
- Order: Lepidoptera
- Family: Crambidae
- Subfamily: Crambinae
- Tribe: Calamotrophini
- Genus: Vaxi
- Species: V. critica

Binomial name
- Vaxi critica Forbes, 1920

= Vaxi critica =

Species of moth

Vaxi critica, the straight-lined vaxi or straight-lined argyria moth, is a moth in the family Crambidae. It was described by William Trowbridge Merrifield Forbes in 1920. It is found in North America, where it has been recorded from Maine and Ontario, south to Florida and west to Illinois. The habitat consists of fields and meadows.

Adults are on wing from June to September in the northern part of the range and from March to July in Florida.
