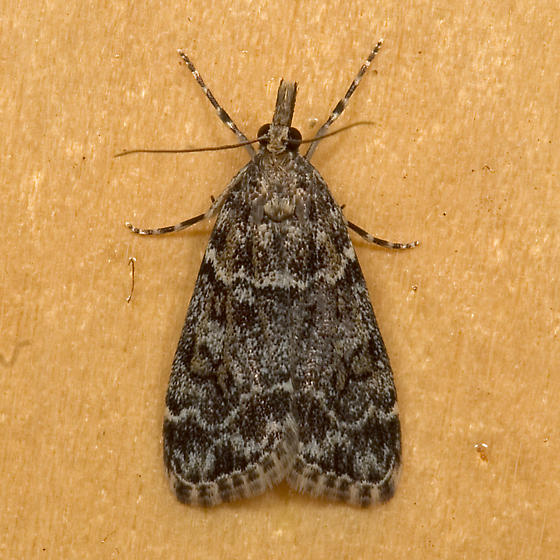

Scientific classification
- Kingdom: Animalia
- Phylum: Arthropoda
- Class: Insecta
- Order: Lepidoptera
- Family: Crambidae
- Genus: Eudonia
- Species: E. echo

Binomial name
- Eudonia echo (Dyar, 1929)

Synonyms
- Scoparia echo Dyar, 1929; Eudonia echo gartrelli Munroe, 1972

= Eudonia echo =

Species of moth

Eudonia echo is a moth of the family Crambidae described by Harrison Gray Dyar Jr. in 1929. It is found in western North America from British Columbia to California.

The wingspan is about 15 mm. Adults are on wing from August to October in California.

== Subspecies ==
- Eudonia echo echo (Vancouver Island, north-western Washington)
- Eudonia echo gartrelli Munroe, 1972 (British Columbia to California)
