= Pyrausta flavipunctalis =

Scientific classification
- Domain: Eukaryota
- Kingdom: Animalia
- Phylum: Arthropoda
- Class: Insecta
- Order: Lepidoptera
- Family: Crambidae
- Genus: Pyrausta
- Species: P. flavipunctalis

Binomial name
- Pyrausta flavipunctalis (Marion, 1954)

Synonyms
- Trigonuncus flavipunctalis Marion, 1954

Species of moth

Pyrausta flavipunctalis is a moth in the family Crambidae. It was described by Hubert Marion in 1954. It is found on Madagascar.
