= Pyrausta melaleucalis =

Scientific classification
- Domain: Eukaryota
- Kingdom: Animalia
- Phylum: Arthropoda
- Class: Insecta
- Order: Lepidoptera
- Family: Crambidae
- Genus: Pyrausta
- Species: P. melaleucalis

Binomial name
- Pyrausta melaleucalis (Eversmann, 1852)

Synonyms
- Ennychia melaleucalis Eversmann, 1852

Species of moth

Pyrausta melaleucalis is a moth in the family Crambidae. It was described by Eduard Friedrich Eversmann in 1852. It is found in Russia.
