= Pyrausta grisealis =

Scientific classification
- Domain: Eukaryota
- Kingdom: Animalia
- Phylum: Arthropoda
- Class: Insecta
- Order: Lepidoptera
- Family: Crambidae
- Genus: Pyrausta
- Species: P. grisealis

Binomial name
- Pyrausta grisealis Maes, 2009

Species of moth

Pyrausta grisealis is a moth in the family Crambidae. It was described by Koen V. N. Maes in 2009. It is found in Namibia.
