= Pyrausta polygamalis =

Scientific classification
- Kingdom: Animalia
- Phylum: Arthropoda
- Class: Insecta
- Order: Lepidoptera
- Family: Crambidae
- Genus: Pyrausta
- Species: P. polygamalis

Binomial name
- Pyrausta polygamalis (Snellen, 1875)

Synonyms
- Botys polygamalis Snellen, 1875; Botys devialis C. Felder, R. Felder & Rogenhofer, 1875; Pyrausta erythropis Dognin, 1906

Species of moth

Pyrausta polygamalis is a moth in the family Crambidae. It was described by Snellen in 1875. It is found in Colombia and Ecuador.
