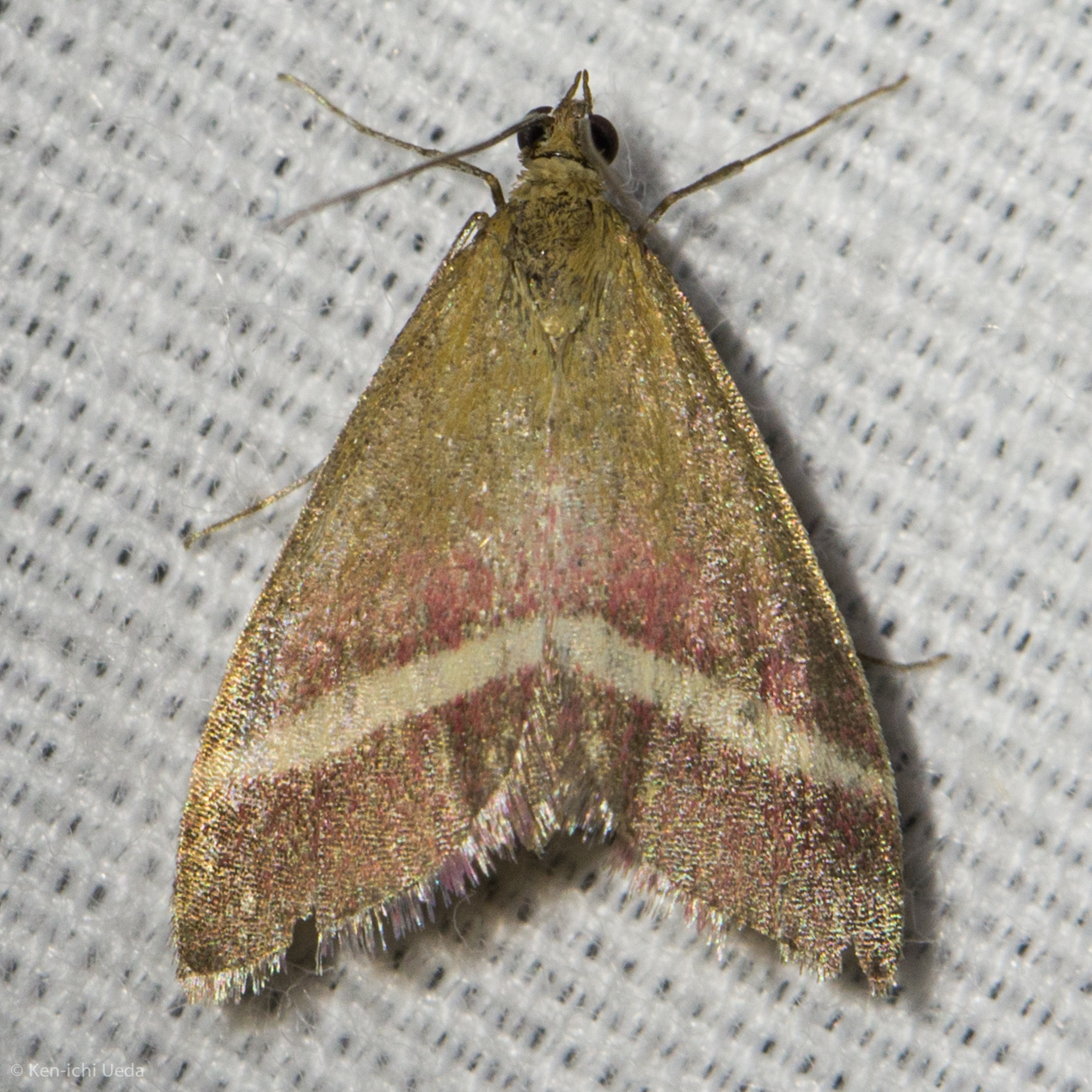

Scientific classification
- Domain: Eukaryota
- Kingdom: Animalia
- Phylum: Arthropoda
- Class: Insecta
- Order: Lepidoptera
- Family: Crambidae
- Genus: Pyrausta
- Species: P. corinthalis

Binomial name
- Pyrausta corinthalis Barnes & McDunnough, 1914

= Pyrausta corinthalis =

Species of moth

Pyrausta corinthalis is a moth in the family Crambidae. It was described by William Barnes and James Halliday McDunnough in 1914. It is found in Mexico and the United States, where it has been recorded from California and Arizona.

Adults have been recorded on wing in April, June and from September to October.
