= Pyrausta chrysoterma =

Scientific classification
- Kingdom: Animalia
- Phylum: Arthropoda
- Class: Insecta
- Order: Lepidoptera
- Family: Crambidae
- Genus: Pyrausta
- Species: P. chrysoterma

Binomial name
- Pyrausta chrysoterma Meyrick, 1933

Species of moth

Pyrausta chrysoterma is a moth in the family Crambidae. It is found in Argentina.
