= Pyrausta ferrealis =

Scientific classification
- Kingdom: Animalia
- Phylum: Arthropoda
- Class: Insecta
- Order: Lepidoptera
- Family: Crambidae
- Genus: Pyrausta
- Species: P. ferrealis

Binomial name
- Pyrausta ferrealis (Hampson, 1900)

Synonyms
- Stenia ferrealis Hampson, 1900; Mardinia ferrealis

Species of moth

Pyrausta ferrealis is a moth in the family Crambidae. It was described by George Hampson in 1900. It is found in Turkey and Armenia.
