= Pyrausta fulvalis =

Scientific classification
- Domain: Eukaryota
- Kingdom: Animalia
- Phylum: Arthropoda
- Class: Insecta
- Order: Lepidoptera
- Family: Crambidae
- Genus: Pyrausta
- Species: P. fulvalis

Binomial name
- Pyrausta fulvalis (Dognin, 1908)

Synonyms
- Hyaloscia fulvalis Dognin, 1908

Species of moth

Pyrausta fulvalis is a moth in the family Crambidae. It is found in Argentina.
