= Pyrausta haemapastalis =

Scientific classification
- Kingdom: Animalia
- Phylum: Arthropoda
- Class: Insecta
- Order: Lepidoptera
- Family: Crambidae
- Genus: Pyrausta
- Species: P. haemapastalis

Binomial name
- Pyrausta haemapastalis Hampson, 1908

Species of moth

Pyrausta haemapastalis is a moth in the family Crambidae. It is found in Brazil.
