= Pyrausta omicronalis =

Scientific classification
- Kingdom: Animalia
- Phylum: Arthropoda
- Class: Insecta
- Order: Lepidoptera
- Family: Crambidae
- Genus: Pyrausta
- Species: P. omicronalis

Binomial name
- Pyrausta omicronalis (Snellen, 1880)

Synonyms
- Botys omicronalis Snellen, 1880

Species of moth

Pyrausta omicronalis is a moth in the family Crambidae. It was described by Snellen in 1880. It is found on Sumatra.
