= Pyrausta gentillalis =

Scientific classification
- Domain: Eukaryota
- Kingdom: Animalia
- Phylum: Arthropoda
- Class: Insecta
- Order: Lepidoptera
- Family: Crambidae
- Genus: Pyrausta
- Species: P. gentillalis

Binomial name
- Pyrausta gentillalis Schaus, 1940

Species of moth

Pyrausta gentillalis is a moth in the family Crambidae. It was described by Schaus in 1940. It is found in Puerto Rico.
