= Pyrausta rubralis =

Scientific classification
- Domain: Eukaryota
- Kingdom: Animalia
- Phylum: Arthropoda
- Class: Insecta
- Order: Lepidoptera
- Family: Crambidae
- Genus: Pyrausta
- Species: P. rubralis

Binomial name
- Pyrausta rubralis (Warren, 1896)

Synonyms
- Eurycreon rubralis Warren, 1896

Species of moth

Pyrausta rubralis is a moth in the family Crambidae. It was described by Warren in 1896. It is found in India (Khasia Hills).
