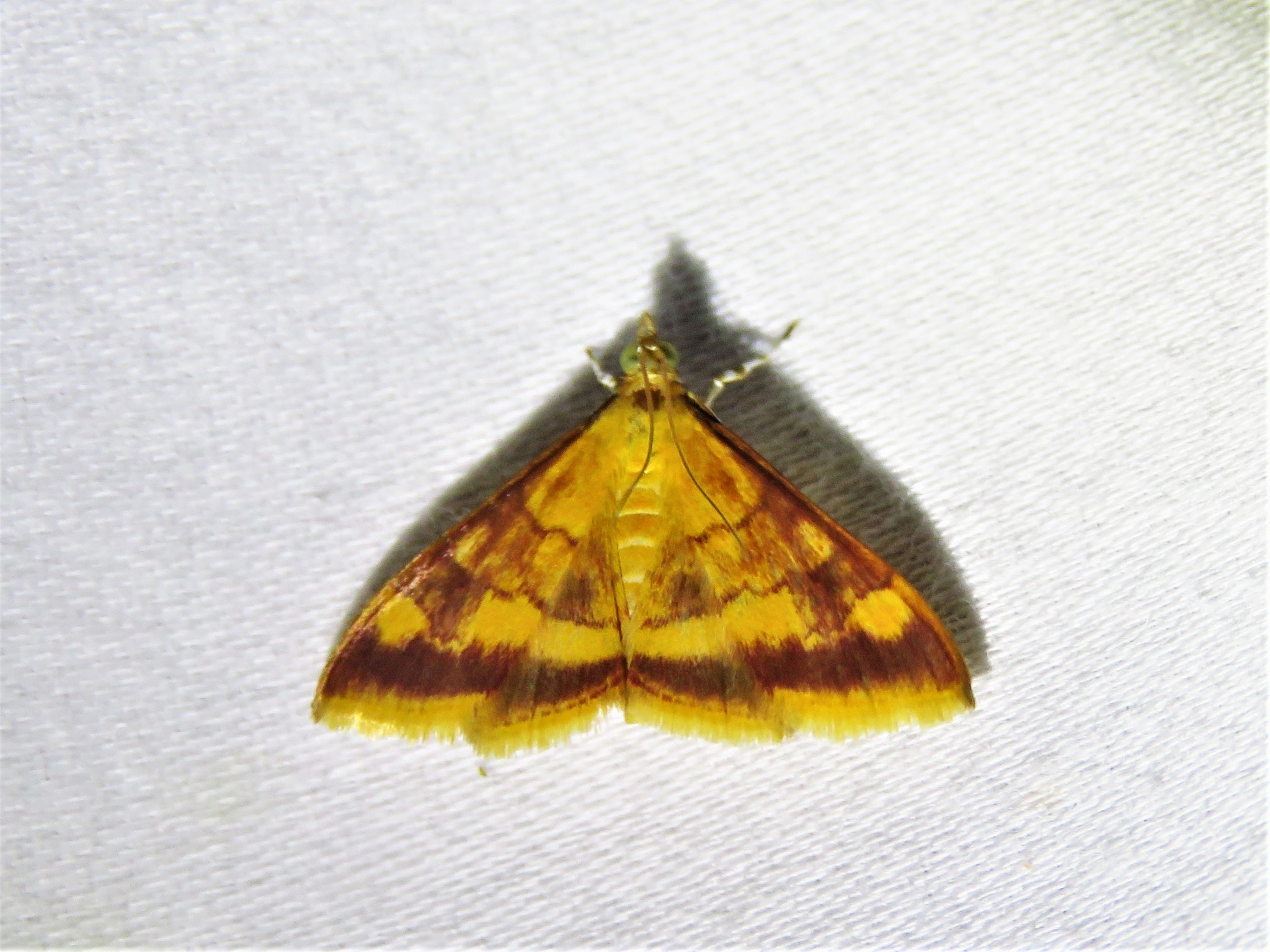

Scientific classification
- Kingdom: Animalia
- Phylum: Arthropoda
- Class: Insecta
- Order: Lepidoptera
- Family: Crambidae
- Genus: Pyrausta
- Species: P. pseudonythesalis

Binomial name
- Pyrausta pseudonythesalis Munroe, 1976

= Pyrausta pseudonythesalis =

Species of moth

Pyrausta pseudonythesalis, the Shasta pyrausta moth, is a moth in the family Crambidae. It was described by Eugene G. Munroe in 1976. It is found in North America, where it has been recorded from California, Nevada, Arizona, New Mexico and Texas.
