= Pyrausta obtusanalis =

Scientific classification
- Domain: Eukaryota
- Kingdom: Animalia
- Phylum: Arthropoda
- Class: Insecta
- Order: Lepidoptera
- Family: Crambidae
- Genus: Pyrausta
- Species: P. obtusanalis

Binomial name
- Pyrausta obtusanalis Druce, 1899

Species of moth

Pyrausta obtusanalis is a moth in the family Crambidae. It was described by Druce in 1899. It is found in Mexico (Jalapa), southern California and Arizona.
