= Pyrausta laristanalis =

Scientific classification
- Domain: Eukaryota
- Kingdom: Animalia
- Phylum: Arthropoda
- Class: Insecta
- Order: Lepidoptera
- Family: Crambidae
- Genus: Pyrausta
- Species: P. laristanalis

Binomial name
- Pyrausta laristanalis Amsel, 1961

Species of moth

Pyrausta laristanalis is a moth in the family Crambidae. It was described by Hans Georg Amsel in 1961. It is found in Iran and the United Arab Emirates.
