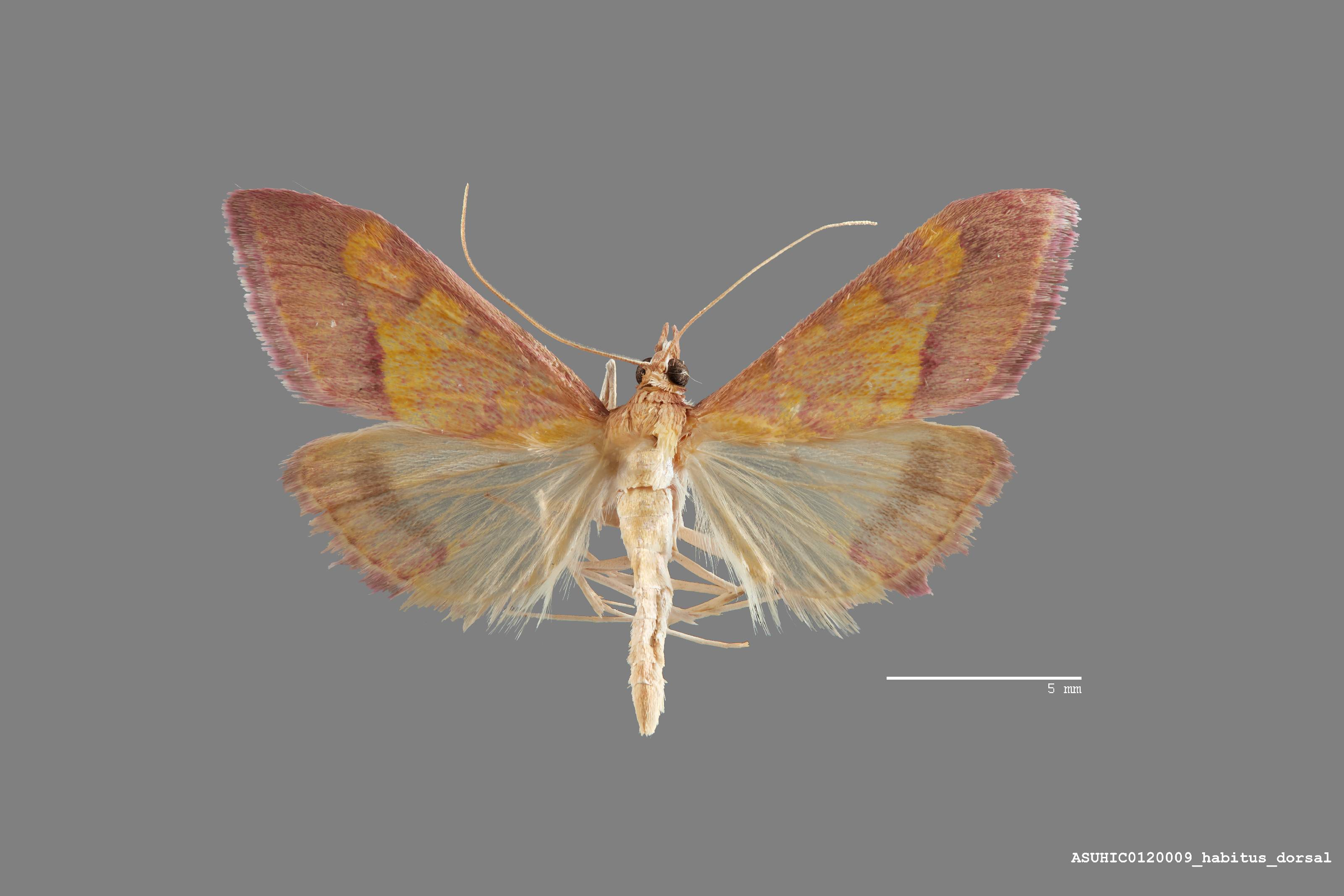

Scientific classification
- Domain: Eukaryota
- Kingdom: Animalia
- Phylum: Arthropoda
- Class: Insecta
- Order: Lepidoptera
- Family: Crambidae
- Genus: Pyrausta
- Species: P. arizonicalis

Binomial name
- Pyrausta arizonicalis Munroe, 1976

Synonyms
- Pyrausta arizonensis Munroe, 1976 (preocc. Munroe, 1957)

= Pyrausta arizonicalis =

Species of moth

Pyrausta arizonicalis is a moth in the family Crambidae. It was described by Eugene G. Munroe in 1976. It is found in North America, where it has been recorded from Texas, New Mexico and Arizona.

Adults are on wing from April to November.
