= Pyrausta andrei =

Scientific classification
- Kingdom: Animalia
- Phylum: Arthropoda
- Class: Insecta
- Order: Lepidoptera
- Family: Crambidae
- Genus: Pyrausta
- Species: P. andrei

Binomial name
- Pyrausta andrei Munroe, 1976

Species of moth

Pyrausta andrei is a moth in the family Crambidae. It was described by Eugene G. Munroe in 1976. It is found in North America, where it has been recorded from Texas.
