= Pyrausta tripunctalis =

Scientific classification
- Domain: Eukaryota
- Kingdom: Animalia
- Phylum: Arthropoda
- Class: Insecta
- Order: Lepidoptera
- Family: Crambidae
- Genus: Pyrausta
- Species: P. tripunctalis

Binomial name
- Pyrausta tripunctalis Dognin, 1908

Species of moth

Pyrausta tripunctalis is a moth in the family Crambidae. It was described by Paul Dognin in 1908. It is found in Peru.
