= Pyrausta melanocera =

Scientific classification
- Kingdom: Animalia
- Phylum: Arthropoda
- Class: Insecta
- Order: Lepidoptera
- Family: Crambidae
- Genus: Pyrausta
- Species: P. melanocera

Binomial name
- Pyrausta melanocera Hampson, 1913

Species of moth

Pyrausta melanocera is a moth in the family Crambidae. It was described by George Hampson in 1913. It is found in Nigeria.
