= Pyrausta ochracealis =

Scientific classification
- Kingdom: Animalia
- Phylum: Arthropoda
- Class: Insecta
- Order: Lepidoptera
- Family: Crambidae
- Genus: Pyrausta
- Species: P. ochracealis

Binomial name
- Pyrausta ochracealis Walker, 1866

Synonyms
- Hapalia denticulosa Moore, 1885

Species of moth

Pyrausta ochracealis is a moth in the family Crambidae. It was described by Francis Walker in 1866. It is found in Sri Lanka, India (Assam), Myanmar, Java and Sulawesi.
