= Pyrausta diplothaera =

Scientific classification
- Kingdom: Animalia
- Phylum: Arthropoda
- Class: Insecta
- Order: Lepidoptera
- Family: Crambidae
- Genus: Pyrausta
- Species: P. diplothaera

Binomial name
- Pyrausta diplothaera Meyrick, 1936

Species of moth

Pyrausta diplothaera is a moth in the family Crambidae. It is found in Venezuela.
