= Pyrausta euprepialis =

Scientific classification
- Kingdom: Animalia
- Phylum: Arthropoda
- Class: Insecta
- Order: Lepidoptera
- Family: Crambidae
- Genus: Pyrausta
- Species: P. euprepialis

Binomial name
- Pyrausta euprepialis Hampson, 1903

Species of moth

Pyrausta euprepialis is a moth in the family Crambidae. It was described by George Hampson in 1903. It is found in Himachal Pradesh, India.
