= Pyrausta tetraplagalis =

Scientific classification
- Kingdom: Animalia
- Phylum: Arthropoda
- Class: Insecta
- Order: Lepidoptera
- Family: Crambidae
- Genus: Pyrausta
- Species: P. tetraplagalis

Binomial name
- Pyrausta tetraplagalis Hampson, 1899

Species of moth

Pyrausta tetraplagalis is a moth in the family Crambidae. It is found in the Democratic Republic of Congo (Katanga, Equateur) and Zimbabwe.

The wingspan is about 16 mm. The forewings are black with an orange subbasal band. The hindwings are black with an orange basal area.
