= Pyrausta xanthomela =

Scientific classification
- Kingdom: Animalia
- Phylum: Arthropoda
- Class: Insecta
- Order: Lepidoptera
- Family: Crambidae
- Genus: Pyrausta
- Species: P. xanthomela

Binomial name
- Pyrausta xanthomela (Hampson, 1913)

Synonyms
- Pachyzancla xanthomela Hampson, 1913

Species of moth

Pyrausta xanthomela is a moth in the family Crambidae. It was described by George Hampson in 1913. It is found in Guatemala.
