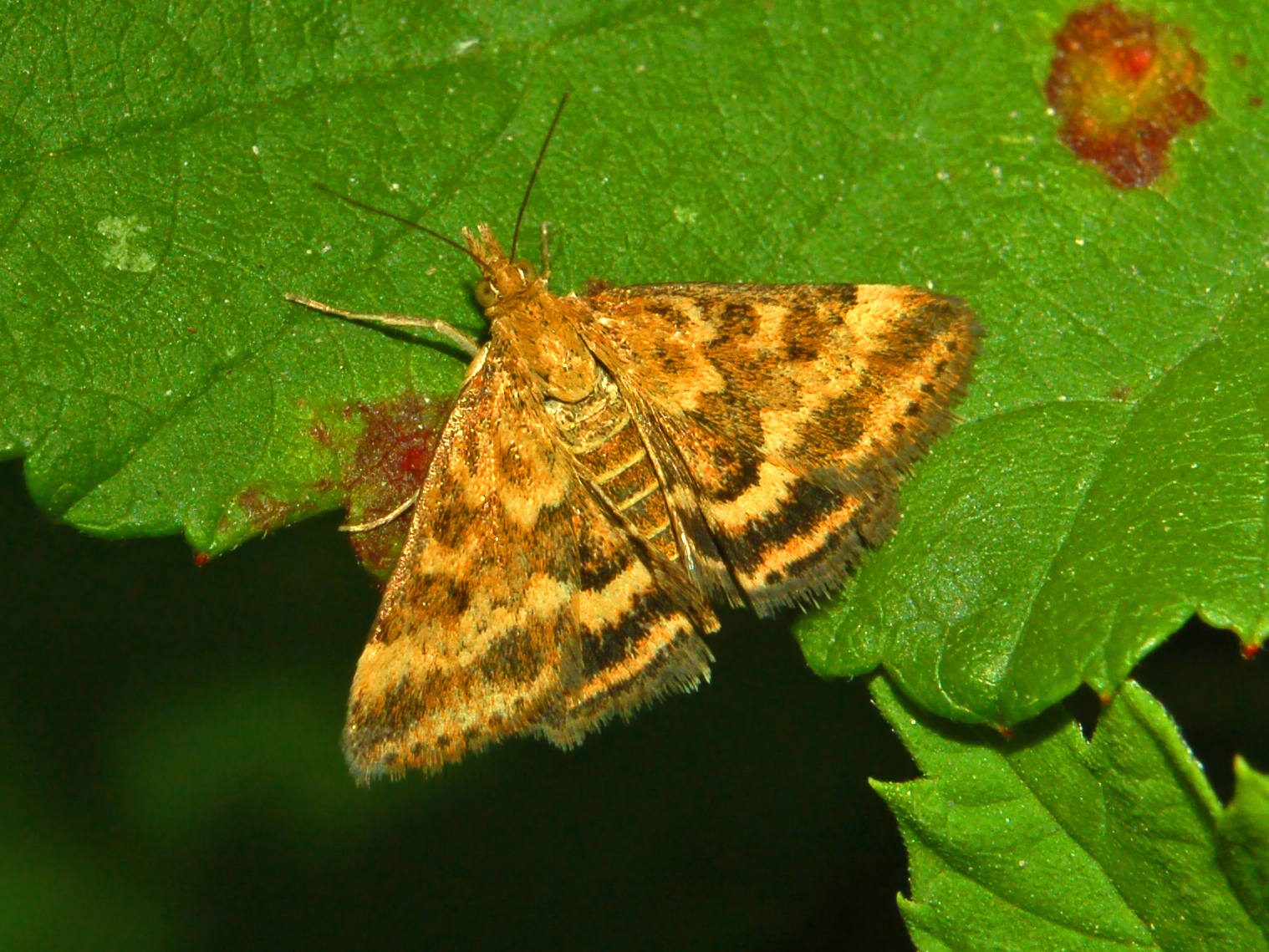
- Pyrausta despicata

Scientific classification
- Domain: Eukaryota
- Kingdom: Animalia
- Phylum: Arthropoda
- Class: Insecta
- Order: Lepidoptera
- Family: Crambidae
- Subfamily: Pyraustinae
- Genus: Pyrausta; Schrank, 1802

Species
- See text

Synonyms
- Aplographe Warren, 1892; Autocosmia Warren, 1892; Botys Latreille, 1802; Botis Swainson, [1821]; Ostreophena Sodoffsky, 1837; Ostreophana Sodoffsky, 1837; Botis J. L. R. Agassiz, 1847; Heliaca Hübner, 1806; Cindaphia Lederer, 1863; Haematia Hübner, 1818; Heliaca Hübner, 1822; Heliaca Hübner, 1818; Heliaca Hübner, 1808; Herbula Guenée, 1854; Hyaloscia Dognin, 1908; Mardinia Amsel, 1952; Panstegia Hübner, 1825; Perilypa Hübner, 1825; Porphyritis Hübner, 1825; Proteroeca Meyrick, 1884; Pyrausta Hübner, 1825; Anthocrypta Warren, 1892; Pyraustes Billberg, 1820; Sciorista Warren, 1890; Rattana Rose & Pajni, 1979; Syllythria Hübner, 1825; Rhodaria Guenée, 1845; Synchromia Guenée, 1854; Tholeria Hübner, 1823; Trigonuncus Amsel, 1952

= Pyrausta (moth) =

Genus of moths

Pyrausta is a speciose genus of moths of the family Crambidae. The genus was erected by Franz von Paula Schrank in 1802.

== Species ==
The genus includes the following species:

=== A ===
- Pyrausta acontialis (Staudinger, 1859)
- Pyrausta acrionalis (Walker, 1859)
- Pyrausta acrobasella Rebel, 1915
- Pyrausta adsocialis Zeller, 1852
- Pyrausta aerealis (Hübner, 1793)
- Pyrausta albescens Hampson, 1913
- Pyrausta albipedalis (Snellen, 1899)
- Pyrausta albogrisea Hampson, 1913
- Pyrausta alexandra Shodotova, 2010
- Pyrausta amatalis Rebel, 1903
- Pyrausta amboinalis (Pagenstecher, 1884)
- Pyrausta amelokalis (Viette, 1958)
- Pyrausta amiculatalis (Berg, 1876)
- Pyrausta anastasia Shodotova, 2010
- Pyrausta andrei Munroe, 1976
- Pyrausta ankaratralis Marion & Viette, 1956
- Pyrausta antisocialis Munroe, 1976
- Pyrausta apicalis (Hampson, 1913)
- Pyrausta approximalis (Guenée, 1854)
- Pyrausta arabica (Butler, 1884)
- Pyrausta arizonicalis Munroe, 1976
- Pyrausta armeniaca Slamka, 2013
- Pyrausta asopialis (Snellen, 1875)
- Pyrausta assutalis (Lederer, 1863)
- Pyrausta atrifusalis Hampson, 1903
- Pyrausta atropurpuralis (Grote, 1877)
- Pyrausta augustalis (C. Felder, R. Felder & Rogenhofer, 1875)
- Pyrausta aurata Scopoli, 1763
- Pyrausta aurea (Hampson, 1913)

=== B-C ===
- Pyrausta babalis (Amsel, 1970)
- Pyrausta bambucivora (Moore, 1888)
- Pyrausta benenotata (Swinhoe, 1894)
- Pyrausta bicoloralis (Guenée, 1854)
- Pyrausta bicornutalis Amsel, 1956
- Pyrausta bieti Oberthür, 1886
- Pyrausta bilineaterminalis Maes, 2009
- Pyrausta bisignata (Butler, 1889)
- Pyrausta bitincta Meyrick, 1932
- Pyrausta borealis Packard, 1867
- Pyrausta bostralis (Hampson, 1919)
- Pyrausta bouveti Viette, 1981
- Pyrausta californicalis (Packard, 1873)
- Pyrausta callidoralis (Oberthür, 1891)
- Pyrausta cardinalis (Guenée, 1854)
- Pyrausta carnifex (C. Felder, R. Felder & Rogenhofer, 1875)
- Pyrausta castalis Treitschke, 1829
- Pyrausta centralis Maes, 2009
- Pyrausta childrenalis (Boisduval, 1833)
- Pyrausta chilialis (C. Felder, R. Felder & Rogenhofer, 1875)
- Pyrausta chrysitis Butler, 1881
- Pyrausta chrysopygalis (Staudinger, 1900)
- Pyrausta chrysoterma Meyrick, 1933
- Pyrausta cingulata (Linnaeus, 1758)
- Pyrausta cinnamomealis (Wallengren, 1860)
- Pyrausta coactalis (Snellen, 1890)
- Pyrausta coccinea Warren, 1892
- Pyrausta coenalis Hampson, 1900
- Pyrausta comastis Meyrick, 1884
- Pyrausta contigualis South in Leech & South, 1901
- Pyrausta contristalis Caradja, 1932
- Pyrausta coracinalis Leraut, 1982
- Pyrausta corinthalis Barnes & McDunnough, 1914
- Pyrausta culminivola Caradja, 1939
- Pyrausta curvalis (Leech, 1889)

=== D-F ===
- Pyrausta dapalis (Grote, 1881)
- Pyrausta decetialis Druce, 1895
- Pyrausta deidamialis (Druce, 1895)
- Pyrausta delicatalis Caradja, 1916
- Pyrausta demantrialis (Druce, 1895)
- Pyrausta despicata (Scopoli, 1763)
- Pyrausta diatoma Hampson, 1913
- Pyrausta diplothaera Meyrick, 1936
- Pyrausta dissimulans Dyar, 1914
- Pyrausta distictalis Hampson, 1918
- Pyrausta draesekei Caradja, 1927
- Pyrausta ecteinalis Hampson, 1900
- Pyrausta elwesi (Staudinger, 1900)
- Pyrausta episcopalis (Herrich-Schäffer, 1871)
- Pyrausta euchromistes Dyar, 1918
- Pyrausta euergestalis (Amsel, 1954)
- Pyrausta euprepialis Hampson, 1903
- Pyrausta euralis Hampson, 1903
- Pyrausta euryphaea Meyrick, 1932
- Pyrausta facitalis (Berg, 1875)
- Pyrausta falcatalis Guenée, 1854
- Pyrausta ferrealis (Hampson, 1900)
- Pyrausta ferrifusalis (Hampson, 1893)
- Pyrausta fieldialis (Schaus, 1933)
- Pyrausta flavibrunnea Hampson, 1913
- Pyrausta flavibrunnealis Hampson, 1908
- Pyrausta flavicollalis Hampson, 1913
- Pyrausta flavidiscata Hampson, 1913
- Pyrausta flavimarginalis (Hampson, 1913)
- Pyrausta flavofascialis (Grote, 1882)
- Pyrausta flavipunctalis (Marion, 1954)
- Pyrausta fodinalis (Lederer, 1863)
- Pyrausta fuliginata Yamanaka, 1978
- Pyrausta fulvalis (Dognin, 1908)
- Pyrausta fulvilinealis Hampson, 1918
- Pyrausta fulvitinctalis Hampson, 1918
- Pyrausta furvicoloralis Hampson, 1900

=== G-K ===
- Pyrausta gazalis Hampson, 1913
- Pyrausta gemmiferalis (Zeller, 1852)
- Pyrausta generosa (Grote & Robinson, 1867)
- Pyrausta genialis South in Leech & South, 1901
- Pyrausta gentillalis Schaus, 1940
- Pyrausta germanalis (Herrich-Schäffer, 1871)
- Pyrausta gracilalis (Herrich-Schäffer, 1871)
- Pyrausta grisealis Maes, 2009
- Pyrausta griseocilialis South in Leech & South, 1901
- Pyrausta griseofumalis Hampson, 1900
- Pyrausta griveaudalis Viette, 1978
- Pyrausta grotei (Munroe, 1976)
- Pyrausta haemapastalis Hampson, 1908
- Pyrausta haematidalis Hampson, 1913
- Pyrausta hampsoni South in Leech & South, 1901
- Pyrausta heliacalis (C. Felder, R. Felder & Rogenhofer, 1875)
- Pyrausta heliothidia Hampson, 1913
- Pyrausta homonymalis (Walker, 1866)
- Pyrausta ictericalis (Snellen, 1895)
- Pyrausta idonealis (Herrich-Schäffer, 1871)
- Pyrausta ignealis (Hampson, 1899)
- Pyrausta ilithucialis (Walker, 1859)
- Pyrausta illiberalis (Hübner, 1823)
- Pyrausta infuscalis Hampson, 1918
- Pyrausta inglorialis (Hampson, 1900)
- Pyrausta inornatalis (Fernald, 1885)
- Pyrausta insequalis (Guenée, 1854)
- Pyrausta insignitalis (Guenée, 1854)
- Pyrausta insularis (Grote & Robinson, 1867)
- Pyrausta interfixalis (Walker, 1869)
- Pyrausta internexalis (Dognin, 1905)
- Pyrausta inveterascalis Barnes & McDunnough, 1918
- Pyrausta issykkulensis (Sauber, 1899)
- Pyrausta kandalis Viette, 1989
- Pyrausta klotsi Munroe, 1976

=== L-N ===
- Pyrausta lambomakandroalis Viette, 1954
- Pyrausta laresalis Schaus, 1940
- Pyrausta laristanalis Amsel, 1961
- Pyrausta laticlavia (Grote & Robinson, 1867)
- Pyrausta leechi South in Leech & South, 1901
- Pyrausta lethalis (Grote, 1881)
- Pyrausta limbata (Butler, 1879)
- Pyrausta limbopunctalis (Herrich-Schäffer, 1849)
- Pyrausta linealis (Fernald, 1894)
- Pyrausta louvinia Clarke, 1965
- Pyrausta maenialis Oberthür, 1894
- Pyrausta mandarinalis South in Leech & South, 1901
- Pyrausta marginepunctalis Gaede, 1916
- Pyrausta melaleucalis (Eversmann, 1852)
- Pyrausta melanocera Hampson, 1913
- Pyrausta metasialis Hampson, 1912
- Pyrausta microdontalis Hampson, 1912
- Pyrausta microdontaloides Maes, 2009
- Pyrausta minimalis Hampson, 1903
- Pyrausta mitis (Butler, 1883)
- Pyrausta monosema Hampson, 1912
- Pyrausta morelensis Lopez & Beutelspacher, 1986
- Pyrausta morenalis (Dyar, 1908)
- Pyrausta moupinalis South in Leech & South, 1901
- Pyrausta mystica Caradja, 1932
- Pyrausta napaealis (Hulst, 1886)
- Pyrausta nexalis (Hulst, 1886)
- Pyrausta nicalis (Grote, 1878)
- Pyrausta nigrata Scopoli, 1763
- Pyrausta nigrimaculata Y.S. Bae & Y.K. Kim, 2002
- Pyrausta niveicilialis (Grote, 1875)
- Pyrausta noctualis Yamanaka, 1978
- Pyrausta nugalis (Snellen, 1899)

=== O-P ===
- Pyrausta oberthuri South in Leech & South, 1901
- Pyrausta obfuscata Scopoli, 1763
- Pyrausta obscurior Caradja, 1938
- Pyrausta obstipalis South in Leech & South, 1901
- Pyrausta obtusanalis Druce, 1899
- Pyrausta occidentalis (Snellen, 1887)
- Pyrausta ochracealis Walker, 1866
- Pyrausta ochreicostalis Barnes & McDunnough, 1918
- Pyrausta odontogrammalis Caradja, 1925
- Pyrausta oenochrois (Meyrick, 1889)
- Pyrausta omicronalis (Snellen, 1880)
- Pyrausta onythesalis (Walker, 1859)
- Pyrausta orphisalis Walker, 1859
- Pyrausta ostrinalis (Hübner, 1796)
- Pyrausta pachyceralis Hampson, 1900
- Pyrausta paghmanalis (Amsel, 1970)
- Pyrausta pastrinalis (Guenée, 1862)
- Pyrausta pauperalis (Staudinger, 1879)
- Pyrausta pavidalis Zerny in Osthelder, 1935
- Pyrausta pectinalis Hampson, 1918
- Pyrausta pellicalis (Staudinger, 1870)
- Pyrausta perkeo Amsel, 1970
- Pyrausta perlalis (Maassen)
- Pyrausta perlelegans Hampson, 1898
- Pyrausta perparvula Maes, 2009
- Pyrausta perrubralis (Packard, 1873)
- Pyrausta persimilis Caradja, 1932
- Pyrausta peyrieralis Viette, 1978
- Pyrausta phaeochysis (Hampson, 1899)
- Pyrausta phaeophoenica Hampson, 1899
- Pyrausta phoenicealis (Hübner, 1818)
- Pyrausta phragmatidalis Hampson, 1908
- Pyrausta pilatealis Barnes & McDunnough, 1914
- Pyrausta pionalis Toll, 1948
- Pyrausta plagalis Haimbach, 1908
- Pyrausta plinthinalis Swinhoe, 1907
- Pyrausta ploimalis Dyar, 1914
- Pyrausta polygamalis (Snellen, 1875)
- Pyrausta porphyralis (Denis & Schiffermüller, 1775)
- Pyrausta postalbalis South in Leech & South, 1901
- Pyrausta postaperta Dyar, 1914
- Pyrausta posticalis Saalmüller, 1880
- Pyrausta prochytalis (Druce, 1895)
- Pyrausta pseuderosnealis Munroe, 1976
- Pyrausta pseudonythesalis Munroe, 1976
- Pyrausta pulchripictalis (Hampson, 1895)
- Pyrausta punctilinealis South in Leech & South, 1901
- Pyrausta purpuralis (Linnaeus, 1758)
- Pyrausta purpuraria (Butler, 1883)
- Pyrausta pygmealis South in Leech & South, 1901
- Pyrausta pyrocausta Hampson, 1899
- Pyrausta pythialis Barnes & McDunnough, 1918

=== Q-S ===
- Pyrausta quadrimaculalis South in Leech & South, 1901
- Pyrausta quadrimaculalis (Dognin, 1908)
- Pyrausta rectifascialis (Sauber, 1899)
- Pyrausta retidiscalis Munroe, 1976
- Pyrausta rhipheusalis (Walker, 1859)
- Pyrausta rhodoxantha Hampson, 1913
- Pyrausta roseivestalis Munroe, 1976
- Pyrausta rubellalis (Snellen, 1890)
- Pyrausta rubescentalis Hampson, 1913
- Pyrausta rubralis (Warren, 1896)
- Pyrausta rubricalis Hübner, 1796
- Pyrausta rueckbeili (Sauber, 1899)
- Pyrausta rufalis South in Leech & South, 1901
- Pyrausta salvia (Druce, 1895)
- Pyrausta sanguifusalis Hampson, 1913
- Pyrausta sanguinalis (Linnaeus, 1767)
- Pyrausta sarobialis (Amsel, 1970)
- Pyrausta sartoralis Barnes & McDunnough, 1914
- Pyrausta scurralis (Hulst, 1886)
- Pyrausta semirubralis (Packard, 1873)
- Pyrausta sexplagialis Gaede, 1917
- Pyrausta shirleyae Munroe, 1976
- Pyrausta signatalis (Walker, 1866)
- Pyrausta sikkima Moore, 1888
- Pyrausta silhetalis Guenée, 1854
- Pyrausta socialis (Grote, 1877)
- Pyrausta splendida Caradja, 1938
- Pyrausta staiusalis (Walker, 1859)
- Pyrausta sthenialis Hampson in Poulton, 1916
- Pyrausta stigmatalis (Sepp, 1855)
- Pyrausta strigatalis Caradja in Caradja & Meyrick, 1937
- Pyrausta suavidalis (Berg, 1899)
- Pyrausta subcrocealis (Snellen, 1880)
- Pyrausta subflavalis (Warren, 1892)
- Pyrausta subfuscalis Caradja in Caradja & Meyrick, 1933
- Pyrausta subgenerosa Munroe, 1976
- Pyrausta subinquinalis (Guenée, 1854)
- Pyrausta subsequalis (Guenée, 1854)
- Pyrausta subviolalis (Herrich-Schäffer, 1871)
- Pyrausta sumptuosalis Caradja, 1927
- Pyrausta surinamensis (Sepp, 1882)
- Pyrausta syfanialis (Oberthür, 1893)
- Pyrausta syntomidalis (Viette, 1960)
- Pyrausta szetschwanalis Caradja, 1927

=== T-Z ===
- Pyrausta tapaishanensis Caradja, 1939
- Pyrausta tatalis (Grote, 1877)
- Pyrausta tenuilinea Hampson, 1913
- Pyrausta terminalis Wileman & South, 1917
- Pyrausta tetraplagalis Hampson, 1899
- Pyrausta theialis (Walker, 1859)
- Pyrausta thibetalis Oberthür, 1886
- Pyrausta tinctalis Lederer, 1863
- Pyrausta tithonialis (Zeller, 1872)
- Pyrausta tortualis South in Leech & South, 1901
- Pyrausta trimaculalis (Staudinger, 1867)
- Pyrausta triphaenalis (Snellen, 1901)
- Pyrausta tripunctalis Dognin, 1908
- Pyrausta trizonalis Hampson, 1899
- Pyrausta tschelialis Caradja, 1927
- Pyrausta tuolumnalis Barnes & McDunnough, 1918
- Pyrausta tyralis (Guenée, 1854)
- Pyrausta unifascialis (Packard, 1873)
- Pyrausta unipunctata Butler, 1881
- Pyrausta vanalis (C. Felder, R. Felder & Rogenhofer, 1875)
- Pyrausta variegalis (Snellen, 1875)
- Pyrausta venilialis (Mabille, 1880)
- Pyrausta vicarialis (Snellen, 1875)
- Pyrausta viola Butler, 1882
- Pyrausta violascens Hampson, 1918
- Pyrausta virginalis Duponchel, 1832
- Pyrausta volupialis (Grote, 1877)
- Pyrausta votanalis Schaus, 1940
- Pyrausta xanthomela (Hampson, 1913)
- Pyrausta zeitunalis Caradja, 1916
- Pyrausta zonalis Barnes & McDunnough, 1918

== Former species ==
The following species were formerly included in this genus:

- Pyrausta atricinctalis Hampson, 1913
- Pyrausta aurea (Hampson, 1913)
- Pyrausta chrysocarpa Meyrick, 1937
- Pyrausta coccinealis
- Pyrausta delicatalis Caradja, 1916
- Pyrausta eriopisalis (Walker, 1859)
- Pyrausta funeralis Zerny, 1914
- Pyrausta incensalis (Lederer, 1863)
- Pyrausta intermedialis Caradja, 1916
- Pyrausta jatrophalis
- Pyrausta julialis (Walker, 1859)
- Pyrausta kukunorensis (Sauber, 1899)
- Pyrausta labordalis Viette, 1958
- Pyrausta mahensis T. B. Fletcher, 1910
- Pyrausta meciti Koçak, 1987
- Pyrausta nerialis (Boisduval, 1833)
- Pyrausta panopealis (Walker, 1859)
- Pyrausta patagoniensis
- Pyrausta procillusalis (Walker, 1859)
- Pyrausta pulvereiumbralis Hampson, 1918
- Pyrausta rufilinealis Hampson, 1910
- Pyrausta semilimbalis Mabille, 1900
- Pyrausta similis (Amsel, 1970)
- Pyrausta suisharyonalis Strand, 1918
- Pyrausta triselena Meyrick, 1937
- Pyrausta xanthothysana Hampson, 1903

== Status unclear ==
- Pyrausta argyralis (O.-G. Costa, 1836), described as Botys argyralis from Italy.
- Pyrausta venalalis (Hulst, 1886), described as Botys venalalis from New York.
