= Pyrausta amiculatalis =

Scientific classification
- Domain: Eukaryota
- Kingdom: Animalia
- Phylum: Arthropoda
- Class: Insecta
- Order: Lepidoptera
- Family: Crambidae
- Genus: Pyrausta
- Species: P. amiculatalis

Binomial name
- Pyrausta amiculatalis (Berg, 1876)

Synonyms
- Botis amiculatalis Berg, 1876; Botys amiculatalis

Species of moth

Pyrausta amiculatalis is a moth in the family Crambidae. It is found in Argentina.

The wingspan is about 16 mm. The ground colour of the forewings is orange-yellow.
