= Pyrausta insularis =

Scientific classification
- Kingdom: Animalia
- Phylum: Arthropoda
- Class: Insecta
- Order: Lepidoptera
- Family: Crambidae
- Genus: Pyrausta
- Species: P. insularis

Binomial name
- Pyrausta insularis (Grote & Robinson, 1867)

Synonyms
- Botys insularis Grote & Robinson, 1867

Species of moth

Pyrausta insularis is a moth in the family Crambidae. It is found in Cuba.

The forewings are cinereous. The hindwings are a little paler.
