= Pyrausta nugalis =

Scientific classification
- Kingdom: Animalia
- Phylum: Arthropoda
- Class: Insecta
- Order: Lepidoptera
- Family: Crambidae
- Genus: Pyrausta
- Species: P. nugalis

Binomial name
- Pyrausta nugalis (Snellen, 1899)

Synonyms
- Botys nugalis Snellen, 1899

Species of moth

Pyrausta nugalis is a moth in the family Crambidae. It was described by Snellen in 1899. It is found on Java and in India (Assam).
