= Pyrausta perlalis =

Scientific classification
- Domain: Eukaryota
- Kingdom: Animalia
- Phylum: Arthropoda
- Class: Insecta
- Order: Lepidoptera
- Family: Crambidae
- Genus: Pyrausta
- Species: P. perlalis

Binomial name
- Pyrausta perlalis (Maassen)

Synonyms
- Botys perlalis Maassen

Species of moth

Pyrausta perlalis is a moth in the family Crambidae. It is found in Ecuador.
