= Pyrausta ecteinalis =

Scientific classification
- Kingdom: Animalia
- Phylum: Arthropoda
- Class: Insecta
- Order: Lepidoptera
- Family: Crambidae
- Genus: Pyrausta
- Species: P. ecteinalis

Binomial name
- Pyrausta ecteinalis Hampson, 1900

Species of moth

Pyrausta ecteinalis is a moth in the family Crambidae. It was described by George Hampson in 1900. It is found in Xinjiang, China.
