= Pyrausta perlelegans =

Scientific classification
- Kingdom: Animalia
- Phylum: Arthropoda
- Class: Insecta
- Order: Lepidoptera
- Family: Crambidae
- Genus: Pyrausta
- Species: P. perlelegans

Binomial name
- Pyrausta perlelegans Hampson, 1898

Species of moth

Pyrausta perlelegans is a moth in the family Crambidae described by George Hampson in 1898. It is found in Colombia and Peru.

The wingspan is about 28 mm.
