= Pyrausta minimalis =

Scientific classification
- Kingdom: Animalia
- Phylum: Arthropoda
- Class: Insecta
- Order: Lepidoptera
- Family: Crambidae
- Genus: Pyrausta
- Species: P. minimalis

Binomial name
- Pyrausta minimalis Hampson, 1903

Species of moth

Pyrausta minimalis is a moth in the family Crambidae. It was described by George Hampson in 1903. It is found in Gujarat, India.
