= Pyrausta morelensis =

Scientific classification
- Domain: Eukaryota
- Kingdom: Animalia
- Phylum: Arthropoda
- Class: Insecta
- Order: Lepidoptera
- Family: Crambidae
- Genus: Pyrausta
- Species: P. morelensis

Binomial name
- Pyrausta morelensis Lopez & Beutelspacher, 1986

Species of moth

Pyrausta morelensis is a moth in the family Crambidae. It is found in Mexico.
