= Pyrausta sartoralis =

Scientific classification
- Domain: Eukaryota
- Kingdom: Animalia
- Phylum: Arthropoda
- Class: Insecta
- Order: Lepidoptera
- Family: Crambidae
- Genus: Pyrausta
- Species: P. sartoralis

Binomial name
- Pyrausta sartoralis Barnes & McDunnough, 1914

Species of moth

Pyrausta sartoralis is a moth in the family Crambidae. It was described by William Barnes and James Halliday McDunnough in 1914. It is found in North America, where it has been recorded from California and Arizona.

The wingspan is about 14–17 mm. The forewings are deep creamy, suffused with brown. The hindwings are whitish, tinged with brown outwardly. Adults have been recorded on wing from March to May and in July.
