= Pyrausta rubescentalis =

Scientific classification
- Kingdom: Animalia
- Phylum: Arthropoda
- Class: Insecta
- Order: Lepidoptera
- Family: Crambidae
- Genus: Pyrausta
- Species: P. rubescentalis

Binomial name
- Pyrausta rubescentalis Hampson, 1913

Species of moth

Pyrausta rubescentalis is a moth in the family Crambidae. It is found in South America.
