= Pyrausta surinamensis =

Scientific classification
- Domain: Eukaryota
- Kingdom: Animalia
- Phylum: Arthropoda
- Class: Insecta
- Order: Lepidoptera
- Family: Crambidae
- Genus: Pyrausta
- Species: P. surinamensis

Binomial name
- Pyrausta surinamensis (Sepp, 1882)

Synonyms
- Botys surinamensis Sepp, 1882

Species of moth

Pyrausta surinamensis is a moth in the family Crambidae. It is found in Suriname.
