= Pyrausta alexandra =

Scientific classification
- Domain: Eukaryota
- Kingdom: Animalia
- Phylum: Arthropoda
- Class: Insecta
- Order: Lepidoptera
- Family: Crambidae
- Genus: Pyrausta
- Species: P. alexandra

Binomial name
- Pyrausta alexandra Shodotova, 2010

Species of moth

Pyrausta alexandra is a moth in the family Crambidae. It was described by Ayuna A. Shodotova in 2010. It is found in Transcaucasia.
