= Pyrausta pachyceralis =

Scientific classification
- Kingdom: Animalia
- Phylum: Arthropoda
- Class: Insecta
- Order: Lepidoptera
- Family: Crambidae
- Genus: Pyrausta
- Species: P. pachyceralis

Binomial name
- Pyrausta pachyceralis Hampson, 1900

Species of moth

Pyrausta pachyceralis is a moth in the family Crambidae. It was described by George Hampson in 1900. It is found in Armenia and Turkey.
