= Pyrausta nigrimaculata =

Scientific classification
- Domain: Eukaryota
- Kingdom: Animalia
- Phylum: Arthropoda
- Class: Insecta
- Order: Lepidoptera
- Family: Crambidae
- Genus: Pyrausta
- Species: P. nigrimaculata

Binomial name
- Pyrausta nigrimaculata Y.S. Bae & Y.K. Kim, 2002

Species of moth

Pyrausta nigrimaculata is a moth in the family Crambidae. It was described by Yang-Seop Bae and Yong-Ki Kim in 2002. It is found in Korea.

The wingspan is 19–21 mm.

== Etymology ==
The species name refers to the extremely blackish wing.
