= Pyrausta louvinia =

Scientific classification
- Domain: Eukaryota
- Kingdom: Animalia
- Phylum: Arthropoda
- Class: Insecta
- Order: Lepidoptera
- Family: Crambidae
- Genus: Pyrausta
- Species: P. louvinia

Binomial name
- Pyrausta louvinia Clarke, 1965

Species of moth

Pyrausta louvinia is a moth in the family Crambidae. It is found on the Juan Fernández Islands.
