= Pyrausta votanalis =

Scientific classification
- Domain: Eukaryota
- Kingdom: Animalia
- Phylum: Arthropoda
- Class: Insecta
- Order: Lepidoptera
- Family: Crambidae
- Genus: Pyrausta
- Species: P. votanalis

Binomial name
- Pyrausta votanalis Schaus, 1940

Species of moth

Pyrausta votanalis is a moth in the family Crambidae. It was described by Schaus in 1940. It is found in Puerto Rico.
