= Pyrausta facitalis =

Scientific classification
- Domain: Eukaryota
- Kingdom: Animalia
- Phylum: Arthropoda
- Class: Insecta
- Order: Lepidoptera
- Family: Crambidae
- Genus: Pyrausta
- Species: P. facitalis

Binomial name
- Pyrausta facitalis (Berg, 1875)

Synonyms
- Botys facitalis Berg, 1875; Mimudea facitalis

Species of moth

Pyrausta facitalis is a moth in the family Crambidae.
