= Pyrausta culminivola =

Scientific classification
- Domain: Eukaryota
- Kingdom: Animalia
- Phylum: Arthropoda
- Class: Insecta
- Order: Lepidoptera
- Family: Crambidae
- Genus: Pyrausta
- Species: P. culminivola

Binomial name
- Pyrausta culminivola Caradja, 1939

Species of moth

Pyrausta culminivola is a moth in the family Crambidae. It was described by Aristide Caradja in 1939. It is found in Tibet, China.
