= Pyrausta bisignata =

Scientific classification
- Domain: Eukaryota
- Kingdom: Animalia
- Phylum: Arthropoda
- Class: Insecta
- Order: Lepidoptera
- Family: Crambidae
- Genus: Pyrausta
- Species: P. bisignata

Binomial name
- Pyrausta bisignata (Butler, 1889)

Synonyms
- Scopula bisignata Butler, 1889

Species of moth

Pyrausta bisignata is a moth in the family Crambidae. It was described by Arthur Gardiner Butler in 1889. It is found in the north-western Himalayas.
