= Pyrausta subcrocealis =

Scientific classification
- Kingdom: Animalia
- Phylum: Arthropoda
- Class: Insecta
- Order: Lepidoptera
- Family: Crambidae
- Genus: Pyrausta
- Species: P. subcrocealis

Binomial name
- Pyrausta subcrocealis (Snellen, 1880)

Synonyms
- Botys subcrocealis Snellen, 1880

Species of moth

Pyrausta subcrocealis is a moth in the family Crambidae. It was described by Snellen in 1880. It is found on Sulawesi.
