= Pyrausta staiusalis =

Scientific classification
- Kingdom: Animalia
- Phylum: Arthropoda
- Class: Insecta
- Order: Lepidoptera
- Family: Crambidae
- Genus: Pyrausta
- Species: P. staiusalis

Binomial name
- Pyrausta staiusalis (Walker, 1859)

Synonyms
- Isopteryx staiusalis Walker, 1859; Mimudea staiusalis; Botys scitalis Lederer, 1863

Species of moth

Pyrausta staiusalis is a moth in the family Crambidae. It is found in Brazil.
