= Pyrausta gemmiferalis =

Scientific classification
- Kingdom: Animalia
- Phylum: Arthropoda
- Clade: Pancrustacea
- Class: Insecta
- Order: Lepidoptera
- Family: Crambidae
- Genus: Pyrausta
- Species: P. gemmiferalis

Binomial name
- Pyrausta gemmiferalis Zeller, 1852

Species of moth

Pyrausta gemmiferalis is a moth in the family Crambidae. It was described by Zeller in 1852. It is found in South Africa.
