= Pyrausta rubellalis =

Scientific classification
- Kingdom: Animalia
- Phylum: Arthropoda
- Class: Insecta
- Order: Lepidoptera
- Family: Crambidae
- Genus: Pyrausta
- Species: P. rubellalis

Binomial name
- Pyrausta rubellalis (Snellen, 1890)

Synonyms
- Botys rubellalis Snellen, 1890

Species of moth

Pyrausta rubellalis is a moth in the family Crambidae. It was described by Snellen in 1890. It is found in India (Sikkim).
