= Pyrausta chrysopygalis =

Scientific classification
- Domain: Eukaryota
- Kingdom: Animalia
- Phylum: Arthropoda
- Class: Insecta
- Order: Lepidoptera
- Family: Crambidae
- Genus: Pyrausta
- Species: P. chrysopygalis

Binomial name
- Pyrausta chrysopygalis (Staudinger, 1900)

Synonyms
- Botys chrysopygalis Staudinger, 1900

Species of moth

Pyrausta chrysopygalis is a moth in the family Crambidae. It was described by Staudinger in 1900. The type locality is in Altai Republic, Russia.
