= Pyrausta tatalis =

Scientific classification
- Kingdom: Animalia
- Phylum: Arthropoda
- Class: Insecta
- Order: Lepidoptera
- Family: Crambidae
- Genus: Pyrausta
- Species: P. tatalis

Binomial name
- Pyrausta tatalis (Grote, 1877)

Synonyms
- Botis tatalis Grote, 1877

Species of moth

Pyrausta tatalis is a moth in the family Crambidae. It was described by Augustus Radcliffe Grote in 1877. It is found in North America, where it has been recorded from California to Texas and Oklahoma.

The wingspan is about 20 mm. The forewings are dark brown. The hindwings are yellow ocherous with a dark subterminal line and a discal spot near the base. Adults have been recorded on wing from April to October.
