= Pyrausta fulvilinealis =

Scientific classification
- Kingdom: Animalia
- Phylum: Arthropoda
- Class: Insecta
- Order: Lepidoptera
- Family: Crambidae
- Genus: Pyrausta
- Species: P. fulvilinealis

Binomial name
- Pyrausta fulvilinealis Hampson, 1918

Species of moth

Pyrausta fulvilinealis is a moth in the family Crambidae. It was described by George Hampson in 1918. It is found in Uganda. And has a wingspan of around 6.9mm on average.
