= Pyrausta tenuilinea =

Scientific classification
- Kingdom: Animalia
- Phylum: Arthropoda
- Class: Insecta
- Order: Lepidoptera
- Family: Crambidae
- Genus: Pyrausta
- Species: P. tenuilinea

Binomial name
- Pyrausta tenuilinea Hampson, 1913

Synonyms
- Pyrausta rhodochroia Dyar, 1914

Species of moth

Pyrausta tenuilinea is a moth in the family Crambidae. It was described by George Hampson in 1913 and it is found in Panama.

The wingspan is about 14 mm. The forewings are purplish pink with a yellowish antemedial line. The hindwings are whitish suffused with brown and a black terminal line.
