= Pyrausta interfixalis =

Scientific classification
- Kingdom: Animalia
- Phylum: Arthropoda
- Class: Insecta
- Order: Lepidoptera
- Family: Crambidae
- Genus: Pyrausta
- Species: P. interfixalis

Binomial name
- Pyrausta interfixalis (Walker, 1869)

Synonyms
- Botys interfixalis Walker, 1869

Species of moth

Pyrausta interfixalis is a moth in the family Crambidae. It was described by Francis Walker in 1869. It is found in the Democratic Republic of the Congo.
