= Pyrausta plinthinalis =

Scientific classification
- Domain: Eukaryota
- Kingdom: Animalia
- Phylum: Arthropoda
- Class: Insecta
- Order: Lepidoptera
- Family: Crambidae
- Genus: Pyrausta
- Species: P. plinthinalis

Binomial name
- Pyrausta plinthinalis C. Swinhoe, 1907

Species of moth

Pyrausta plinthinalis is a moth in the family Crambidae. It was described by Charles Swinhoe in 1907. It is found on Sumatra in Indonesia.
