= Pyrausta adsocialis =

Scientific classification
- Kingdom: Animalia
- Phylum: Arthropoda
- Clade: Pancrustacea
- Class: Insecta
- Order: Lepidoptera
- Family: Crambidae
- Genus: Pyrausta
- Species: P. adsocialis

Binomial name
- Pyrausta adsocialis (Zeller, 1852)

Synonyms
- Botys adsocialis Zeller, 1852

Species of moth

Pyrausta adsocialis is a moth in the family Crambidae. It was described by Zeller in 1852. It is found in South Africa.
