= Pyrausta idonealis =

Scientific classification
- Domain: Eukaryota
- Kingdom: Animalia
- Phylum: Arthropoda
- Class: Insecta
- Order: Lepidoptera
- Family: Crambidae
- Genus: Pyrausta
- Species: P. idonealis

Binomial name
- Pyrausta idonealis (Herrich-Schäffer, 1871)

Synonyms
- Botys idonealis Herrich-Schäffer, 1871

Species of moth

Pyrausta idonealis is a moth in the family Crambidae. It is found in Cuba.
