= Pyrausta tuolumnalis =

Scientific classification
- Domain: Eukaryota
- Kingdom: Animalia
- Phylum: Arthropoda
- Class: Insecta
- Order: Lepidoptera
- Family: Crambidae
- Genus: Pyrausta
- Species: P. tuolumnalis

Binomial name
- Pyrausta tuolumnalis Barnes & McDunnough, 1918

Species of moth

Pyrausta tuolumnalis is a moth in the family Crambidae. It was described by William Barnes and James Halliday McDunnough in 1918. It is found in North America, where it has been recorded from the western Northwest Territories and Yukon, south through British Columbia and Alberta to the mountains of California and New Mexico.
