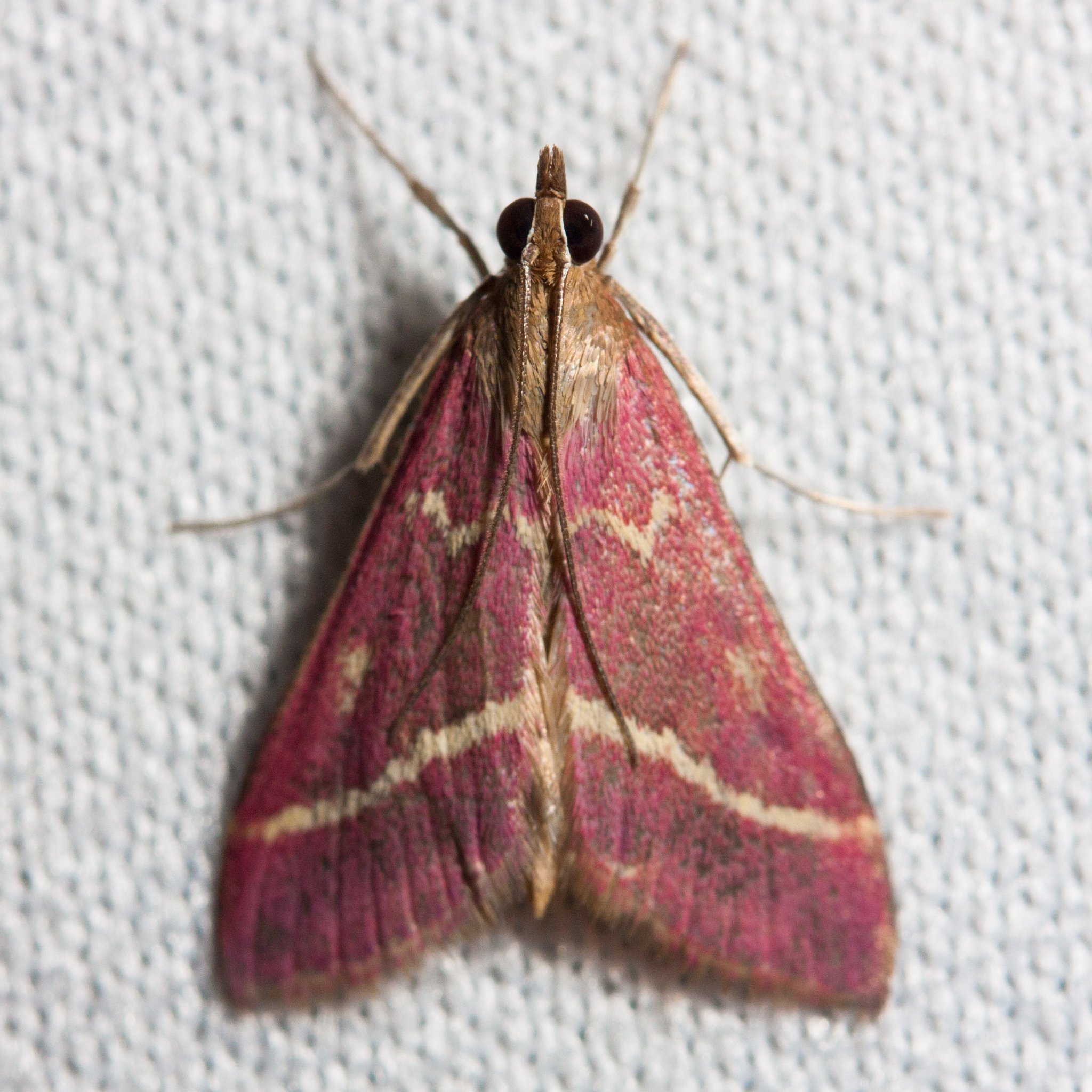

Scientific classification
- Domain: Eukaryota
- Kingdom: Animalia
- Phylum: Arthropoda
- Class: Insecta
- Order: Lepidoptera
- Family: Crambidae
- Genus: Pyrausta
- Species: P. volupialis

Binomial name
- Pyrausta volupialis (Grote, 1877)

Synonyms
- Botis volupialis Grote, 1877

= Pyrausta volupialis =

Species of moth

Pyrausta volupialis, the volupial pyrausta moth, is a moth in the family Crambidae. It was described by Augustus Radcliffe Grote in 1877. It is found in North America, where it has been recorded from Oklahoma, Utah, Texas, Colorado, New Mexico, Arizona and California to Chiapas, Mexico.

The length of the forewings is 8-10.5 mm. Adults have been recorded year round.

The larvae feed on Lamiaceae species, including Rosmarinus officinalis.
