= Pyrausta ferrifusalis =

Scientific classification
- Kingdom: Animalia
- Phylum: Arthropoda
- Class: Insecta
- Order: Lepidoptera
- Family: Crambidae
- Genus: Pyrausta
- Species: P. ferrifusalis

Binomial name
- Pyrausta ferrifusalis (Hampson, 1893)

Synonyms
- Paliga ferrifusalis Hampson, 1893

Species of moth

Pyrausta ferrifusalis is a moth in the family Crambidae. It was described by George Hampson in 1893. It is found in Sri Lanka and Myanmar.
