= Pyrausta flavicollalis =

Scientific classification
- Kingdom: Animalia
- Phylum: Arthropoda
- Class: Insecta
- Order: Lepidoptera
- Family: Crambidae
- Genus: Pyrausta
- Species: P. flavicollalis

Binomial name
- Pyrausta flavicollalis Hampson, 1913

Species of moth

Pyrausta flavicollalis is a moth in the family Crambidae. It is found in Argentina.
