= Pyrausta elwesi =

Scientific classification
- Domain: Eukaryota
- Kingdom: Animalia
- Phylum: Arthropoda
- Class: Insecta
- Order: Lepidoptera
- Family: Crambidae
- Genus: Pyrausta
- Species: P. elwesi

Binomial name
- Pyrausta elwesi (Staudinger, 1900)

Synonyms
- Botys elwesi Staudinger, 1900

Species of moth

Pyrausta elwesi is a moth in the family Crambidae. It was described by Staudinger in 1900. It is found in Russia (Altai).
