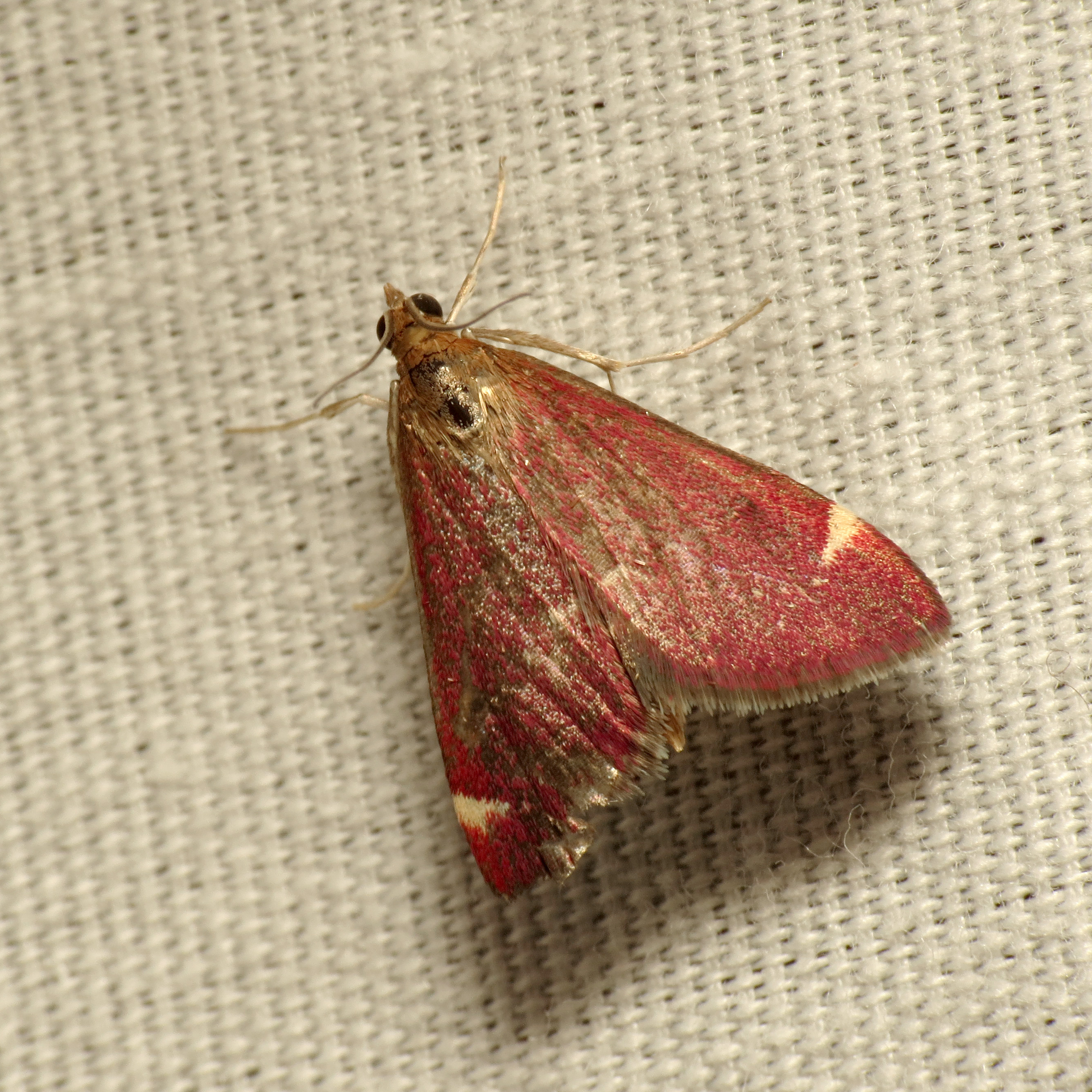

Scientific classification
- Domain: Eukaryota
- Kingdom: Animalia
- Phylum: Arthropoda
- Class: Insecta
- Order: Lepidoptera
- Family: Crambidae
- Genus: Pyrausta
- Species: P. grotei

Binomial name
- Pyrausta grotei (Munroe, 1976)

Synonyms
- Botis grotei Munroe, 1976; Botis augustalis Grote, 1881 (preocc. Felder & Rogenhofer, 1874)

= Pyrausta grotei =

Species of moth

Pyrausta grotei is a moth in the family Crambidae. It was described by Eugene G. Munroe in 1976. It is found in North America, where it has been recorded from Washington, Oregon, Montana, California, Utah, Colorado, Wyoming, Nevada, Arizona and Texas.

The forewings are dark vinous rosy with a brown base. There is a pale yellow spot on the costa. The hindwings are fuscous. Adults have been recorded on wing from April to August.
