= Pyrausta bicornutalis =

Scientific classification
- Domain: Eukaryota
- Kingdom: Animalia
- Phylum: Arthropoda
- Class: Insecta
- Order: Lepidoptera
- Family: Crambidae
- Genus: Pyrausta
- Species: P. bicornutalis

Binomial name
- Pyrausta bicornutalis Amsel, 1956

Species of moth

Pyrausta bicornutalis is a moth in the family Crambidae. It is found in Venezuela.
