= Pyrausta euralis =

Scientific classification
- Domain: Eukaryota
- Kingdom: Animalia
- Phylum: Arthropoda
- Class: Insecta
- Order: Lepidoptera
- Family: Crambidae
- Genus: Pyrausta
- Species: P. euralis

Binomial name
- Pyrausta euralis Hampson, 1903

Species of moth

Pyrausta euralis is a moth in the family Crambidae. It was described by George Hampson in 1903. It is found in Kashmir.
