= Pyrausta zonalis =

Scientific classification
- Domain: Eukaryota
- Kingdom: Animalia
- Phylum: Arthropoda
- Class: Insecta
- Order: Lepidoptera
- Family: Crambidae
- Genus: Pyrausta
- Species: P. zonalis

Binomial name
- Pyrausta zonalis Barnes & McDunnough, 1918

Species of moth

Pyrausta zonalis is a moth in the family Crambidae. It was described by William Barnes and James Halliday McDunnough in 1918. It is found in North America, where it has been recorded from Texas, Arizona and California.

The wingspan is about 15–16 mm. The forewings are deep smoky brown. The hindwings are dull smoky. Adults have been recorded on wing in February, from April to August and in October.
