= Pyrausta microdontaloides =

Scientific classification
- Domain: Eukaryota
- Kingdom: Animalia
- Phylum: Arthropoda
- Class: Insecta
- Order: Lepidoptera
- Family: Crambidae
- Genus: Pyrausta
- Species: P. microdontaloides

Binomial name
- Pyrausta microdontaloides Maes, 2009

Synonyms
- Pyrausta microdontalis Hampson, 1918 (preocc. Hampson, 1912)

Species of moth

Pyrausta microdontaloides is a moth in the family Crambidae. It was described by Koen V. N. Maes in 2009. It is found in Kenya and Tanzania.
