= Pyrausta phragmatidalis =

Scientific classification
- Kingdom: Animalia
- Phylum: Arthropoda
- Class: Insecta
- Order: Lepidoptera
- Family: Crambidae
- Genus: Pyrausta
- Species: P. phragmatidalis

Binomial name
- Pyrausta phragmatidalis Hampson, 1908

Species of moth

Pyrausta phragmatidalis is a moth in the family Crambidae. It was described by George Hampson in 1908. It is found in Sikkim, India.
