= Pyrausta prochytalis =

Scientific classification
- Domain: Eukaryota
- Kingdom: Animalia
- Phylum: Arthropoda
- Class: Insecta
- Order: Lepidoptera
- Family: Crambidae
- Genus: Pyrausta
- Species: P. prochytalis

Binomial name
- Pyrausta prochytalis (H. Druce, 1895)

Synonyms
- Herbula prochytalis H. Druce, 1895

Species of moth

Pyrausta prochytalis is a moth in the family Crambidae. It was described by Herbert Druce in 1895. It is found in Guatemala.
