= Pyrausta occidentalis =

Scientific classification
- Kingdom: Animalia
- Phylum: Arthropoda
- Class: Insecta
- Order: Lepidoptera
- Family: Crambidae
- Genus: Pyrausta
- Species: P. occidentalis

Binomial name
- Pyrausta occidentalis (Snellen, 1887)

Synonyms
- Botyodes occidentalis Snellen, 1887

Species of moth

Pyrausta occidentalis is a moth in the family Crambidae. It is found on Curaçao.
