= Pyrausta microdontalis =

Scientific classification
- Kingdom: Animalia
- Phylum: Arthropoda
- Class: Insecta
- Order: Lepidoptera
- Family: Crambidae
- Genus: Pyrausta
- Species: P. microdontalis

Binomial name
- Pyrausta microdontalis Hampson, 1912

Species of moth

Pyrausta microdontalis is a moth in the family Crambidae. It was described by George Hampson in 1912. It is found in Sri Lanka.
