= Pyrausta monosema =

Scientific classification
- Kingdom: Animalia
- Phylum: Arthropoda
- Class: Insecta
- Order: Lepidoptera
- Family: Crambidae
- Genus: Pyrausta
- Species: P. monosema

Binomial name
- Pyrausta monosema Hampson, 1912

Species of moth

Pyrausta monosema is a moth in the family Crambidae. It was described by George Hampson in 1912. It is found in Pakistan.
