= Pyrausta heliothidia =

Scientific classification
- Kingdom: Animalia
- Phylum: Arthropoda
- Class: Insecta
- Order: Lepidoptera
- Family: Crambidae
- Genus: Pyrausta
- Species: P. heliothidia

Binomial name
- Pyrausta heliothidia Hampson, 1913

Species of moth

Pyrausta heliothidia is a moth in the family Crambidae. It is found in Peru.
