= Pyrausta kandalis =

Scientific classification
- Kingdom: Animalia
- Phylum: Arthropoda
- Class: Insecta
- Order: Lepidoptera
- Family: Crambidae
- Genus: Pyrausta
- Species: P. kandalis

Binomial name
- Pyrausta kandalis Viette, 1989

Species of moth in the family Crambidae from Madagascar

Pyrausta kandalis is a moth in the family Crambidae. It was described by Viette in 1989. It is found in Madagascar.
