= Pyrausta perkeo =

Scientific classification
- Domain: Eukaryota
- Kingdom: Animalia
- Phylum: Arthropoda
- Class: Insecta
- Order: Lepidoptera
- Family: Crambidae
- Genus: Pyrausta
- Species: P. perkeo

Binomial name
- Pyrausta perkeo Amsel, 1970

Species of moth

Pyrausta perkeo is a moth in the family Crambidae. It was described by Hans Georg Amsel in 1970 and is found in Afghanistan.
