= Pyrausta stigmatalis =

Scientific classification
- Domain: Eukaryota
- Kingdom: Animalia
- Phylum: Arthropoda
- Class: Insecta
- Order: Lepidoptera
- Family: Crambidae
- Genus: Pyrausta
- Species: P. stigmatalis

Binomial name
- Pyrausta stigmatalis (Sepp, 1855)

Synonyms
- Phaleana (Tortrix) stigmatalis Sepp, 1855

Species of moth

Pyrausta stigmatalis is a moth in the family Crambidae. It is found in Suriname.
