= Pyrausta pythialis =

Scientific classification
- Domain: Eukaryota
- Kingdom: Animalia
- Phylum: Arthropoda
- Class: Insecta
- Order: Lepidoptera
- Family: Crambidae
- Genus: Pyrausta
- Species: P. pythialis

Binomial name
- Pyrausta pythialis Barnes & McDunnough, 1918

Species of moth

Pyrausta pythialis is a moth in the family Crambidae. It was described by William Barnes and James Halliday McDunnough in 1918. It is found in North America, where it has been recorded from Manitoba and Saskatchewan.

The wingspan is about 17 mm. The forewings are deep pink, with a bright yellow patch at the base of the wing on the inner margin. The hindwings are smoky with a bright yellow central area on the outer margin. Adults have been recorded on wing in June.
