= Pyrausta bambucivora =

Scientific classification
- Domain: Eukaryota
- Kingdom: Animalia
- Phylum: Arthropoda
- Class: Insecta
- Order: Lepidoptera
- Family: Crambidae
- Genus: Pyrausta
- Species: P. bambucivora

Binomial name
- Pyrausta bambucivora (Moore, 1888)

Synonyms
- Ebulea bambucivora Moore, 1888; Nascia arenalis Hampson, 1893

Species of moth

Pyrausta bambucivora is a moth in the family Crambidae. It was described by Frederic Moore in 1888. It is found in India.
