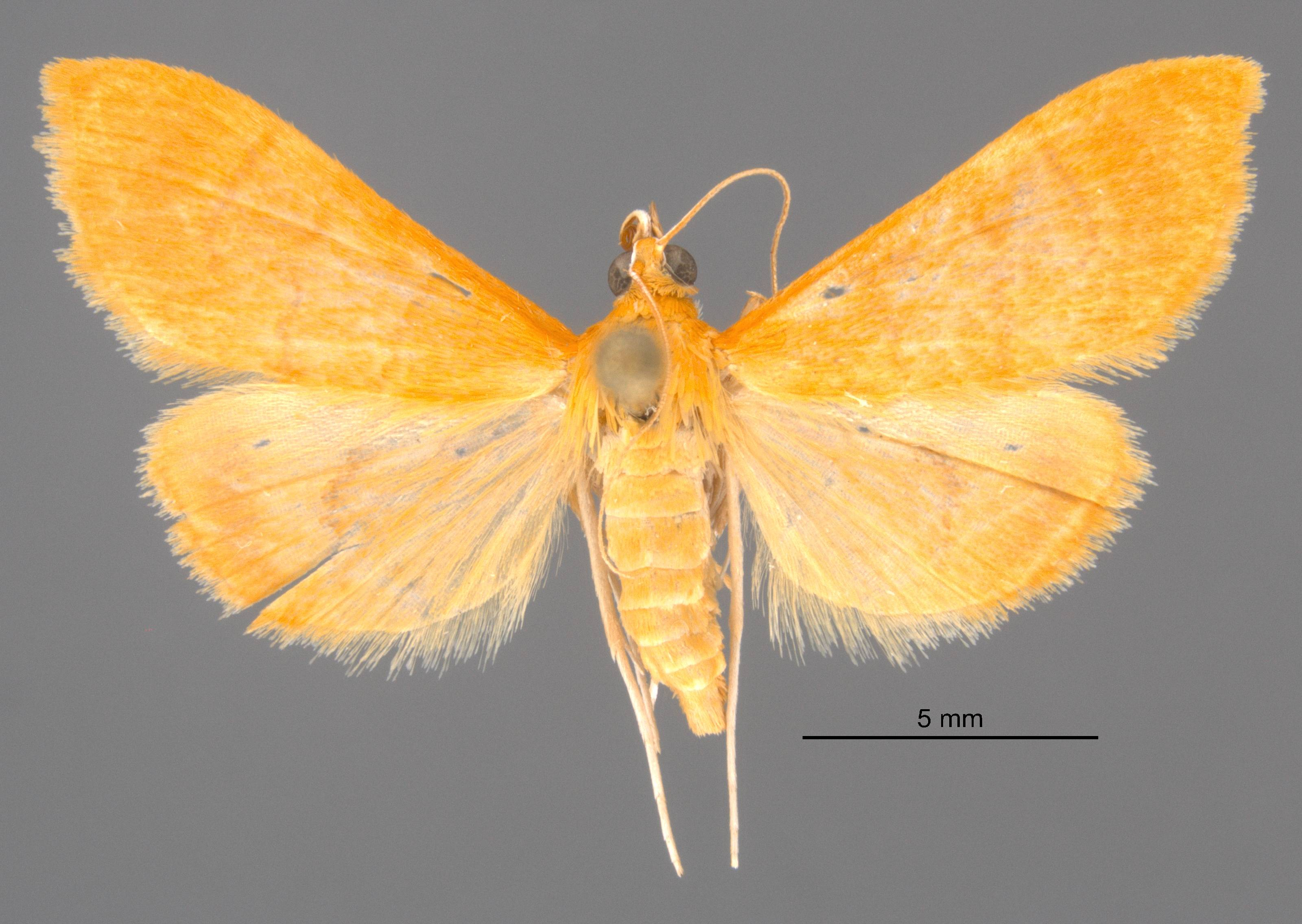

Scientific classification
- Kingdom: Animalia
- Phylum: Arthropoda
- Class: Insecta
- Order: Lepidoptera
- Family: Crambidae
- Genus: Pyrausta
- Species: P. aurea

Binomial name
- Pyrausta aurea (Hampson, 1913)

Synonyms
- Pachyzancla aurea Hampson, 1913 (not Butler, 1875)

= Pyrausta aurea =

Species of moth

Pyrausta aurea is a moth in the family Crambidae. It was described by George Hampson in 1913. It is found from Nevada, southern Arizona, southern Texas and Mexico south at least to Costa Rica.

The wingspan is about 18 mm for males and 20 mm for females. Adults are orange with a faint oblique antemedial line on the forewings. Adults are on wing from June to August.
