= Pyrausta rueckbeili =

Scientific classification
- Domain: Eukaryota
- Kingdom: Animalia
- Phylum: Arthropoda
- Class: Insecta
- Order: Lepidoptera
- Family: Crambidae
- Genus: Pyrausta
- Species: P. rueckbeili

Binomial name
- Pyrausta rueckbeili (Sauber, 1899)

Synonyms
- Botys rueckbeili Sauber, 1899

Species of moth

Pyrausta rueckbeili is a moth in the family Crambidae. It was described by Sauber in 1899. It is found in China.
