= Pyrausta phaeochysis =

Scientific classification
- Kingdom: Animalia
- Phylum: Arthropoda
- Class: Insecta
- Order: Lepidoptera
- Family: Crambidae
- Genus: Pyrausta
- Species: P. phaeochysis

Binomial name
- Pyrausta phaeochysis (Hampson, 1899)

Synonyms
- Pionea phaeochysis Hampson, 1899

Species of moth

Pyrausta phaeochysis is a moth in the family Crambidae. It was described by George Hampson in 1899. It is found in Ecuador.
