= Pyrausta euryphaea =

Scientific classification
- Kingdom: Animalia
- Phylum: Arthropoda
- Class: Insecta
- Order: Lepidoptera
- Family: Crambidae
- Genus: Pyrausta
- Species: P. euryphaea

Binomial name
- Pyrausta euryphaea Meyrick, 1932

Synonyms
- Botys euryphaea Walker, 1866

Species of moth

Pyrausta euryphaea is a moth in the family Crambidae. It was described by Edward Meyrick in 1932. It is found on Java in Indonesia.
