= Pyrausta euchromistes =

Scientific classification
- Domain: Eukaryota
- Kingdom: Animalia
- Phylum: Arthropoda
- Class: Insecta
- Order: Lepidoptera
- Family: Crambidae
- Genus: Pyrausta
- Species: P. euchromistes

Binomial name
- Pyrausta euchromistes Dyar, 1918

Species of moth

Pyrausta euchromistes is a moth in the family Crambidae. It is found in Mexico.
