= Pyrausta sikkima =

Scientific classification
- Domain: Eukaryota
- Kingdom: Animalia
- Phylum: Arthropoda
- Class: Insecta
- Order: Lepidoptera
- Family: Crambidae
- Genus: Pyrausta
- Species: P. sikkima

Binomial name
- Pyrausta sikkima (Moore, 1888)

Synonyms
- Porphyritis sikkima Moore, 1888

Species of moth

Pyrausta sikkima is a moth in the family Crambidae. It was described by Frederic Moore in 1888. It is found in the Himalayas and on the Andamans.
