= Pyrausta vanalis =

Scientific classification
- Domain: Eukaryota
- Kingdom: Animalia
- Phylum: Arthropoda
- Class: Insecta
- Order: Lepidoptera
- Family: Crambidae
- Genus: Pyrausta
- Species: P. vanalis

Binomial name
- Pyrausta vanalis (C. Felder, R. Felder & Rogenhofer, 1875)

Synonyms
- Botys vanalis C. Felder, R. Felder & Rogenhofer, 1875; Pyrausta ranalis

Species of moth

Pyrausta vanalis is a moth in the family Crambidae. It was described by Cajetan Felder, Rudolf Felder and Alois Friedrich Rogenhofer in 1875. It is found in Colombia.
