= Pyrausta peyrieralis =

Scientific classification
- Kingdom: Animalia
- Phylum: Arthropoda
- Class: Insecta
- Order: Lepidoptera
- Family: Crambidae
- Genus: Pyrausta
- Species: P. peyrieralis

Binomial name
- Pyrausta peyrieralis Viette, 1978

Species of moth

Pyrausta peyrieralis is a moth in the family Crambidae. It was described by Viette in 1978. It is found in Madagascar.
