= Pyrausta euergestalis =

Scientific classification
- Domain: Eukaryota
- Kingdom: Animalia
- Phylum: Arthropoda
- Class: Insecta
- Order: Lepidoptera
- Family: Crambidae
- Genus: Pyrausta
- Species: P. euergestalis

Binomial name
- Pyrausta euergestalis (Amsel, 1954)

Synonyms
- Trigonuncus euergestalis Amsel, 1954

Species of moth

Pyrausta euergestalis is a moth in the family Crambidae. It was described by Hans Georg Amsel in 1954 and is found in Iran.
