= Pyrausta fulvitinctalis =

Scientific classification
- Kingdom: Animalia
- Phylum: Arthropoda
- Class: Insecta
- Order: Lepidoptera
- Family: Crambidae
- Genus: Pyrausta
- Species: P. fulvitinctalis

Binomial name
- Pyrausta fulvitinctalis Hampson, 1918

Species of moth

Pyrausta fulvitinctalis is a moth in the family Crambidae. It was described by George Hampson in 1918. It is found in Ecuador.
