= Pyrausta lambomakandroalis =

Scientific classification
- Kingdom: Animalia
- Phylum: Arthropoda
- Class: Insecta
- Order: Lepidoptera
- Family: Crambidae
- Genus: Pyrausta
- Species: P. lambomakandroalis

Binomial name
- Pyrausta lambomakandroalis Viette, 1954

Species of moth

Pyrausta lambomakandroalis is a moth in the family Crambidae. It was described by Viette in 1954. It is found in Madagascar.
