= Pyrausta pyrocausta =

Scientific classification
- Kingdom: Animalia
- Phylum: Arthropoda
- Class: Insecta
- Order: Lepidoptera
- Family: Crambidae
- Genus: Pyrausta
- Species: P. pyrocausta

Binomial name
- Pyrausta pyrocausta Hampson, 1899

Species of moth

Pyrausta pyrocausta is a moth in the family Crambidae described by George Hampson in 1899. It is found in the Brazilian states of São Paulo and Paraná.

The wingspan is about 20 mm. The forewings are yellow, suffused with fulvous brown. The hindwings are orange yellow, with a black postmedial line and a fuscous terminal band, as well as a terminal series of black points.
