= Pyrausta pionalis =

Scientific classification
- Domain: Eukaryota
- Kingdom: Animalia
- Phylum: Arthropoda
- Class: Insecta
- Order: Lepidoptera
- Family: Crambidae
- Genus: Pyrausta
- Species: P. pionalis

Binomial name
- Pyrausta pionalis Toll, 1948

Synonyms
- Trigonuncus nissalis Amsel, 1951; Trigonuncus similis Amsel, 1970

Species of moth

Pyrausta pionalis is a moth in the family Crambidae. It was described by Toll in 1948. It is found in Iran and Afghanistan.
