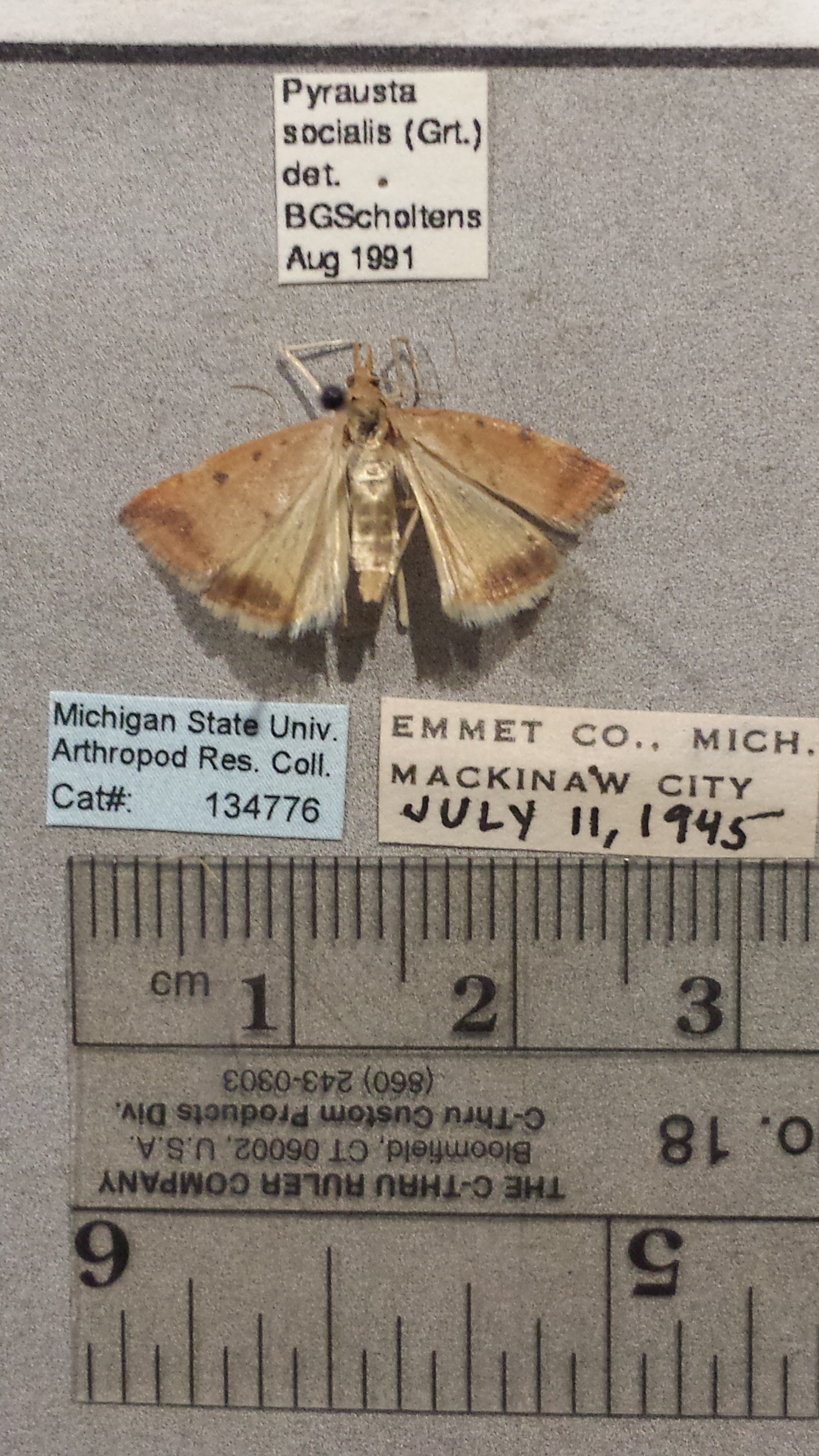

Scientific classification
- Kingdom: Animalia
- Phylum: Arthropoda
- Class: Insecta
- Order: Lepidoptera
- Family: Crambidae
- Genus: Pyrausta
- Species: P. socialis

Binomial name
- Pyrausta socialis (Grote, 1877)

Synonyms
- Botis socialis Grote, 1877

= Pyrausta socialis =

Species of moth

Pyrausta socialis, the sociable pyrausta moth, is a moth in the family Crambidae. It was described by Augustus Radcliffe Grote in 1877. It is found in North America, where it has been recorded from Ontario west to British Columbia, south to Montana and Colorado.

== Subspecies ==
- Pyrausta socialis socialis
- Pyrausta socialis perpallidalis Munroe, 1976 (Washington, Oregon)
