= Pyrausta albipedalis =

Scientific classification
- Kingdom: Animalia
- Phylum: Arthropoda
- Class: Insecta
- Order: Lepidoptera
- Family: Crambidae
- Genus: Pyrausta
- Species: P. albipedalis

Binomial name
- Pyrausta albipedalis (Snellen, 1899)

Synonyms
- Botys albipedalis Snellen, 1899

Species of moth

Pyrausta albipedalis is a moth in the family Crambidae. It was described by Snellen in 1899. It is found on Java.
