= Pyrausta ankaratralis =

Scientific classification
- Kingdom: Animalia
- Phylum: Arthropoda
- Class: Insecta
- Order: Lepidoptera
- Family: Crambidae
- Genus: Pyrausta
- Species: P. ankaratralis

Binomial name
- Pyrausta ankaratralis Marion & Viette, 1956

Species of moth

Pyrausta ankaratralis is a moth in the family Crambidae. It was described by Hubert Marion and Pierre Viette in 1956. It is found on Madagascar.
