= Pyrausta rhipheusalis =

Scientific classification
- Kingdom: Animalia
- Phylum: Arthropoda
- Class: Insecta
- Order: Lepidoptera
- Family: Crambidae
- Genus: Pyrausta
- Species: P. rhipheusalis

Binomial name
- Pyrausta rhipheusalis (Walker, 1859)

Synonyms
- Botys rhipheusalis Walker, 1859

Species of moth

Pyrausta rhipheusalis is a moth in the family Crambidae. It was described by Francis Walker in 1859. It is found on Borneo.
