= Pyrausta albescens =

Scientific classification
- Domain: Eukaryota
- Kingdom: Animalia
- Phylum: Arthropoda
- Class: Insecta
- Order: Lepidoptera
- Family: Crambidae
- Genus: Pyrausta
- Species: P. albescens

Binomial name
- Pyrausta albescens Hampson, 1913

Species of moth

Pyrausta albescens is a moth in the family Crambidae. It is found in Peru.
