= Pyrausta rhodoxantha =

Scientific classification
- Kingdom: Animalia
- Phylum: Arthropoda
- Class: Insecta
- Order: Lepidoptera
- Family: Crambidae
- Genus: Pyrausta
- Species: P. rhodoxantha

Binomial name
- Pyrausta rhodoxantha Hampson, 1913

Species of moth

Pyrausta rhodoxantha is a moth in the family Crambidae. It is found in Mexico.
