= Pyrausta ilithucialis =

Scientific classification
- Kingdom: Animalia
- Phylum: Arthropoda
- Class: Insecta
- Order: Lepidoptera
- Family: Crambidae
- Genus: Pyrausta
- Species: P. ilithucialis

Binomial name
- Pyrausta ilithucialis (Walker, 1859)

Synonyms
- Herbula ilithucialis Walker, 1859

Species of moth

Pyrausta ilithucialis is a moth in the family Crambidae. It was described by Francis Walker in 1859. It is found in Colombia.
