= Pyrausta albogrisea =

Scientific classification
- Kingdom: Animalia
- Phylum: Arthropoda
- Class: Insecta
- Order: Lepidoptera
- Family: Crambidae
- Genus: Pyrausta
- Species: P. albogrisea

Binomial name
- Pyrausta albogrisea Hampson, 1913

Species of moth

Pyrausta albogrisea is a moth in the family Crambidae. It is found in Colombia.
