= Pyrausta bitincta =

Scientific classification
- Kingdom: Animalia
- Phylum: Arthropoda
- Class: Insecta
- Order: Lepidoptera
- Family: Crambidae
- Genus: Pyrausta
- Species: P. bitincta

Binomial name
- Pyrausta bitincta Meyrick, 1932

Synonyms
- Pyrausta tinctalis Hampson (preocc. Lederer)

Species of moth

Pyrausta bitincta is a moth in the family Crambidae. It was described by Edward Meyrick in 1932. It is found in southern India.
