= Pyrausta ploimalis =

Scientific classification
- Kingdom: Animalia
- Phylum: Arthropoda
- Class: Insecta
- Order: Lepidoptera
- Family: Crambidae
- Genus: Pyrausta
- Species: P. ploimalis

Binomial name
- Pyrausta ploimalis Dyar, 1914

Species of moth

Pyrausta ploimalis is a moth in the family Crambidae. It is found in Panama.

The wingspan is about 16 mm. The wings are whitish creamy, tinged with brown along the margins. The lines are broad and blurred and there is a scattering of black scales over the wings. Adults have been recorded on wing in August and November.
