= Pyrausta fieldialis =

Scientific classification
- Domain: Eukaryota
- Kingdom: Animalia
- Phylum: Arthropoda
- Class: Insecta
- Order: Lepidoptera
- Family: Crambidae
- Genus: Pyrausta
- Species: P. fieldialis

Binomial name
- Pyrausta fieldialis (Schaus, 1933)

Synonyms
- Boeotarcha fieldialis Schaus, 1933

Species of moth

Pyrausta fieldialis is a moth in the family Crambidae. It is found in Brazil (Parana).
