= Pyrausta vicarialis =

Scientific classification
- Kingdom: Animalia
- Phylum: Arthropoda
- Class: Insecta
- Order: Lepidoptera
- Family: Crambidae
- Genus: Pyrausta
- Species: P. vicarialis

Binomial name
- Pyrausta vicarialis (Snellen, 1875)

Synonyms
- Botys vicarialis Snellen, 1875

Species of moth

Pyrausta vicarialis is a moth in the family Crambidae. It is found in Colombia.
