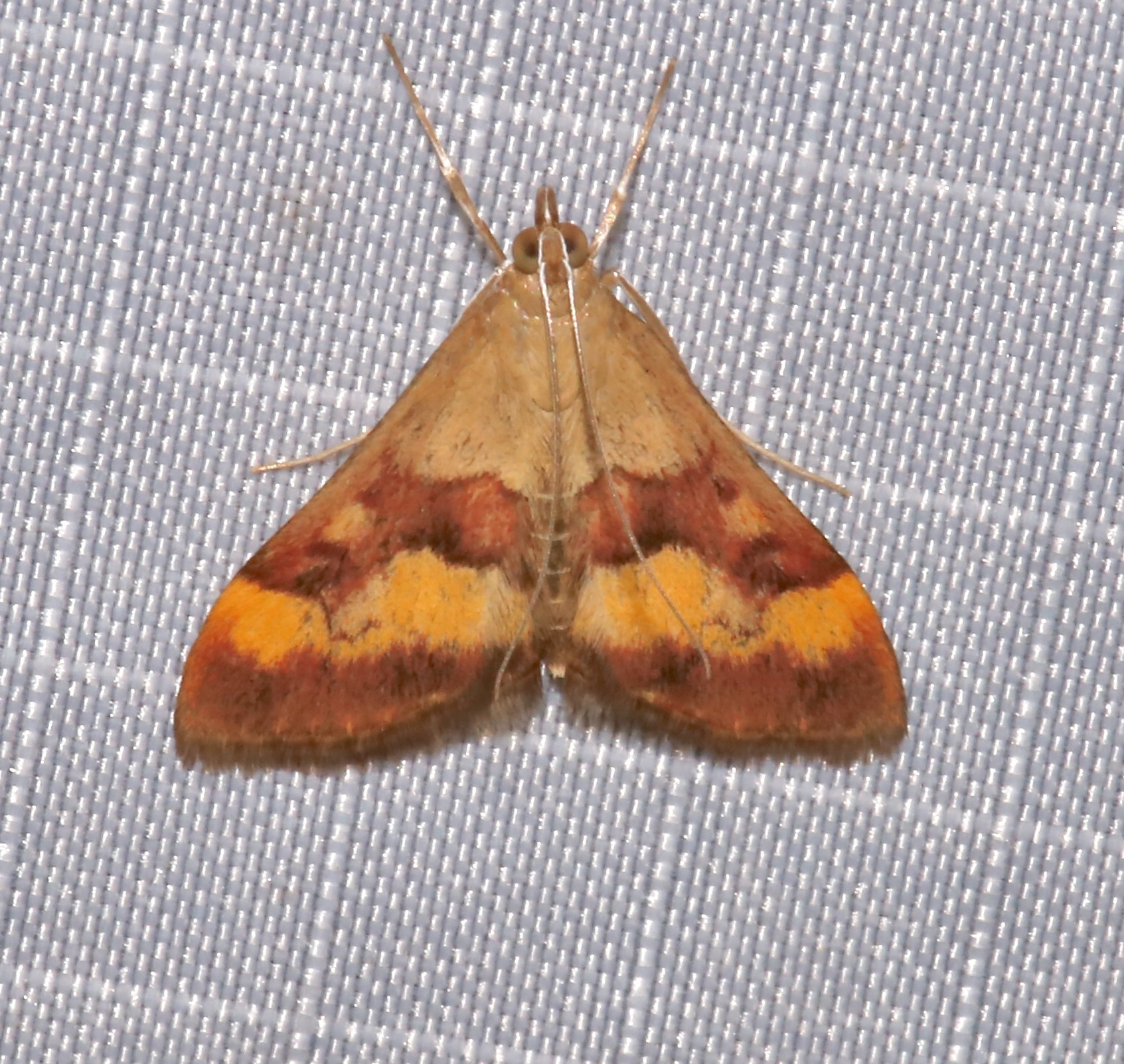

Scientific classification
- Kingdom: Animalia
- Phylum: Arthropoda
- Class: Insecta
- Order: Lepidoptera
- Family: Crambidae
- Genus: Pyrausta
- Species: P. flavofascialis

Binomial name
- Pyrausta flavofascialis (Grote, 1882)

Synonyms
- Botis flavofascialis Grote, 1882

= Pyrausta flavofascialis =

Species of moth

Pyrausta flavofascialis is a moth in the family Crambidae. It was described by Augustus Radcliffe Grote in 1882. It is found in North America, where it has been recorded from western Texas to Arizona. It is also found in Mexico.

The wingspan is about 21 mm. The forewings are olivaceous at the base, shading to yellowish. The median area and terminal space is purple. The hindwings are pale with a fuscous terminal line. Adults are on wing in May and from July to September.
