= Pyrausta pilatealis =

Scientific classification
- Domain: Eukaryota
- Kingdom: Animalia
- Phylum: Arthropoda
- Class: Insecta
- Order: Lepidoptera
- Family: Crambidae
- Genus: Pyrausta
- Species: P. pilatealis

Binomial name
- Pyrausta pilatealis Barnes & McDunnough, 1914

Species of moth

Pyrausta pilatealis is a moth in the family Crambidae. It was described by William Barnes and James Halliday McDunnough in 1914. It is found in North America, where it has been recorded from California and eastern Washington.

The wingspan is about 20 mm. The forewings are grayish white, slightly sprinkled with brown scales. The hindwings are pale smoky, darker along the outer border. Adults have been recorded on wing from April to July and in September.
