= Pyrausta variegalis =

Scientific classification
- Kingdom: Animalia
- Phylum: Arthropoda
- Class: Insecta
- Order: Lepidoptera
- Family: Crambidae
- Genus: Pyrausta
- Species: P. variegalis

Binomial name
- Pyrausta variegalis (Snellen, 1875)

Synonyms
- Botys variegalis Snellen, 1875

Species of moth

Pyrausta variegalis is a moth in the family Crambidae. It is found in Colombia.
