= Pyrausta asopialis =

Scientific classification
- Kingdom: Animalia
- Phylum: Arthropoda
- Class: Insecta
- Order: Lepidoptera
- Family: Crambidae
- Genus: Pyrausta
- Species: P. asopialis

Binomial name
- Pyrausta asopialis Snellen, 1875

Synonyms
- Eurycreon asopialis Snellen, 1875; Loxostege asopialis; Syllthria rhealis Druce, 1895

Species of moth

Pyrausta asopialis is a moth in the family Crambidae. It is found in Colombia and Central America.
