= Pyrausta issykkulensis =

Scientific classification
- Domain: Eukaryota
- Kingdom: Animalia
- Phylum: Arthropoda
- Class: Insecta
- Order: Lepidoptera
- Family: Crambidae
- Genus: Pyrausta
- Species: P. issykkulensis

Binomial name
- Pyrausta issykkulensis (Sauber, 1899)

Synonyms
- Botys issykkulensis Sauber, 1899

Species of moth

Pyrausta issykkulensis is a moth in the family Crambidae. It was described by Sauber in 1899. It is found in Kyrgyzstan.
