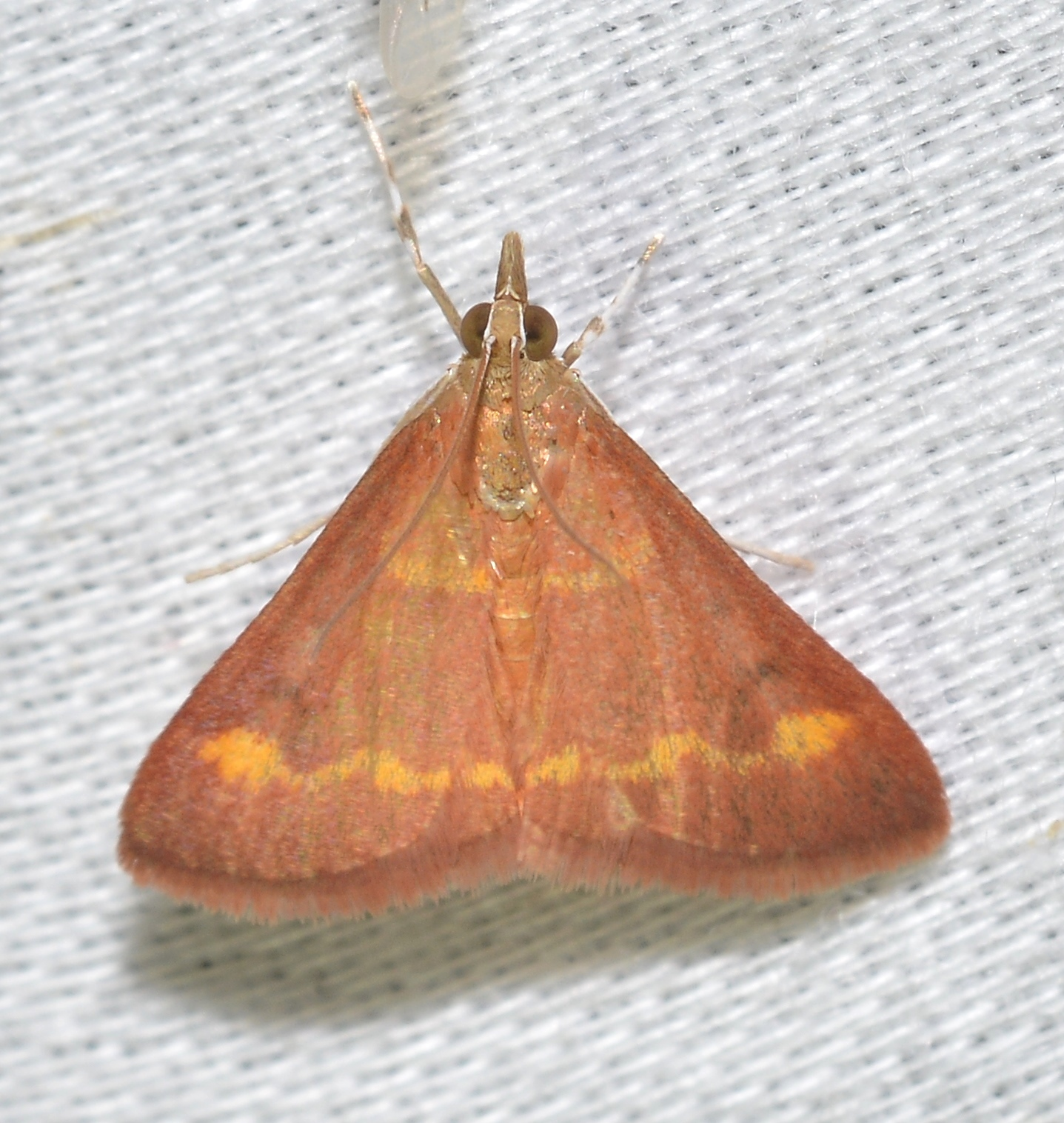

Scientific classification
- Domain: Eukaryota
- Kingdom: Animalia
- Phylum: Arthropoda
- Class: Insecta
- Order: Lepidoptera
- Family: Crambidae
- Genus: Pyrausta
- Species: P. pseuderosnealis

Binomial name
- Pyrausta pseuderosnealis Munroe, 1976

= Pyrausta pseuderosnealis =

Species of moth

Pyrausta pseuderosnealis is a moth in the family Crambidae. It was described by Eugene G. Munroe in 1976. It is found in Mexico and the United States, where it has been recorded from California, Texas, Florida, Alabama, Georgia, Iowa, Mississippi, South Carolina, Louisiana, Arkansas, Missouri, Illinois and Oklahoma.

The wingspan is 12–15 mm. Adults have been recorded on wing from January to October.
