= Pyrausta antisocialis =

Scientific classification
- Domain: Eukaryota
- Kingdom: Animalia
- Phylum: Arthropoda
- Class: Insecta
- Order: Lepidoptera
- Family: Crambidae
- Genus: Pyrausta
- Species: P. antisocialis

Binomial name
- Pyrausta antisocialis Munroe, 1976

Species of moth

Pyrausta antisocialis is a moth in the family Crambidae. It was described by Eugene G. Munroe in 1976. It is found in North America, where it has been recorded from New Mexico and Arizona.

Adults are on wing from June to August.
