= Pyrausta purpuraria =

Scientific classification
- Kingdom: Animalia
- Phylum: Arthropoda
- Class: Insecta
- Order: Lepidoptera
- Family: Crambidae
- Genus: Pyrausta
- Species: P. purpuraria

Binomial name
- Pyrausta purpuraria (Butler, 1883)

Synonyms
- Rhodaria purpuraria Butler, 1883

Species of moth

Pyrausta purpuraria is a moth in the family Crambidae. It was described by Arthur Gardiner Butler in 1883. It is found in Chile.
