= Pyrausta subinquinalis =

Scientific classification
- Kingdom: Animalia
- Phylum: Arthropoda
- Class: Insecta
- Order: Lepidoptera
- Family: Crambidae
- Genus: Pyrausta
- Species: P. subinquinalis

Binomial name
- Pyrausta subinquinalis (Guenée, 1854)

Synonyms
- Ebulea subinquinalis Guenée, 1854

Species of moth

Pyrausta subinquinalis is a moth in the family Crambidae. It was described by Achille Guenée in 1854. It is found in Brazil.
