= Pyrausta tinctalis =

Scientific classification
- Kingdom: Animalia
- Phylum: Arthropoda
- Class: Insecta
- Order: Lepidoptera
- Family: Crambidae
- Genus: Pyrausta
- Species: P. tinctalis

Binomial name
- Pyrausta tinctalis (Lederer, 1863)

Synonyms
- Botys tinctalis Lederer, 1863; Pyrausta tinctalis Hampson, 1892

Species of moth

Pyrausta tinctalis is a moth in the family Crambidae. It was described by Julius Lederer in 1863. It is found in Venezuela.
