= Pyrausta assutalis =

Scientific classification
- Domain: Eukaryota
- Kingdom: Animalia
- Phylum: Arthropoda
- Class: Insecta
- Order: Lepidoptera
- Family: Crambidae
- Genus: Pyrausta
- Species: P. assutalis

Binomial name
- Pyrausta assutalis (Lederer, 1863)

Synonyms
- Botys assutalis Lederer, 1863

Species of moth

Pyrausta assutalis is a moth in the family Crambidae. It was described by Julius Lederer in 1863. It is found in Venezuela.
