= Pyrausta ictericalis =

Scientific classification
- Kingdom: Animalia
- Phylum: Arthropoda
- Class: Insecta
- Order: Lepidoptera
- Family: Crambidae
- Genus: Pyrausta
- Species: P. ictericalis

Binomial name
- Pyrausta ictericalis (Snellen, 1895)

Synonyms
- Botys ictericalis Snellen, 1895

Species of moth

Pyrausta ictericalis is a moth in the family Crambidae. It was first described by Snellen in 1895. It is found on Java.
