= Pyrausta terminalis =

Scientific classification
- Domain: Eukaryota
- Kingdom: Animalia
- Phylum: Arthropoda
- Class: Insecta
- Order: Lepidoptera
- Family: Crambidae
- Genus: Pyrausta
- Species: P. terminalis

Binomial name
- Pyrausta terminalis Wileman & South, 1917

Species of moth

Pyrausta terminalis is a moth in the family Crambidae. It was described by Wileman and South in 1917. It is found in Taiwan.
