= Pyrausta armeniaca =

Scientific classification
- Domain: Eukaryota
- Kingdom: Animalia
- Phylum: Arthropoda
- Class: Insecta
- Order: Lepidoptera
- Family: Crambidae
- Genus: Pyrausta
- Species: P. armeniaca

Binomial name
- Pyrausta armeniaca Slamka, 2013

Species of moth

Pyrausta armeniaca is a moth in the family Crambidae. It was described by Slamka in 2013. It is found in Armenia.
