= Pyrausta dissimulans =

Scientific classification
- Kingdom: Animalia
- Phylum: Arthropoda
- Class: Insecta
- Order: Lepidoptera
- Family: Crambidae
- Genus: Pyrausta
- Species: P. dissimulans

Binomial name
- Pyrausta dissimulans Dyar, 1914

Species of moth

Pyrausta dissimulans is a moth in the family Crambidae. It was described by Harrison Gray Dyar Jr. in 1914. It is found in Mexico.
