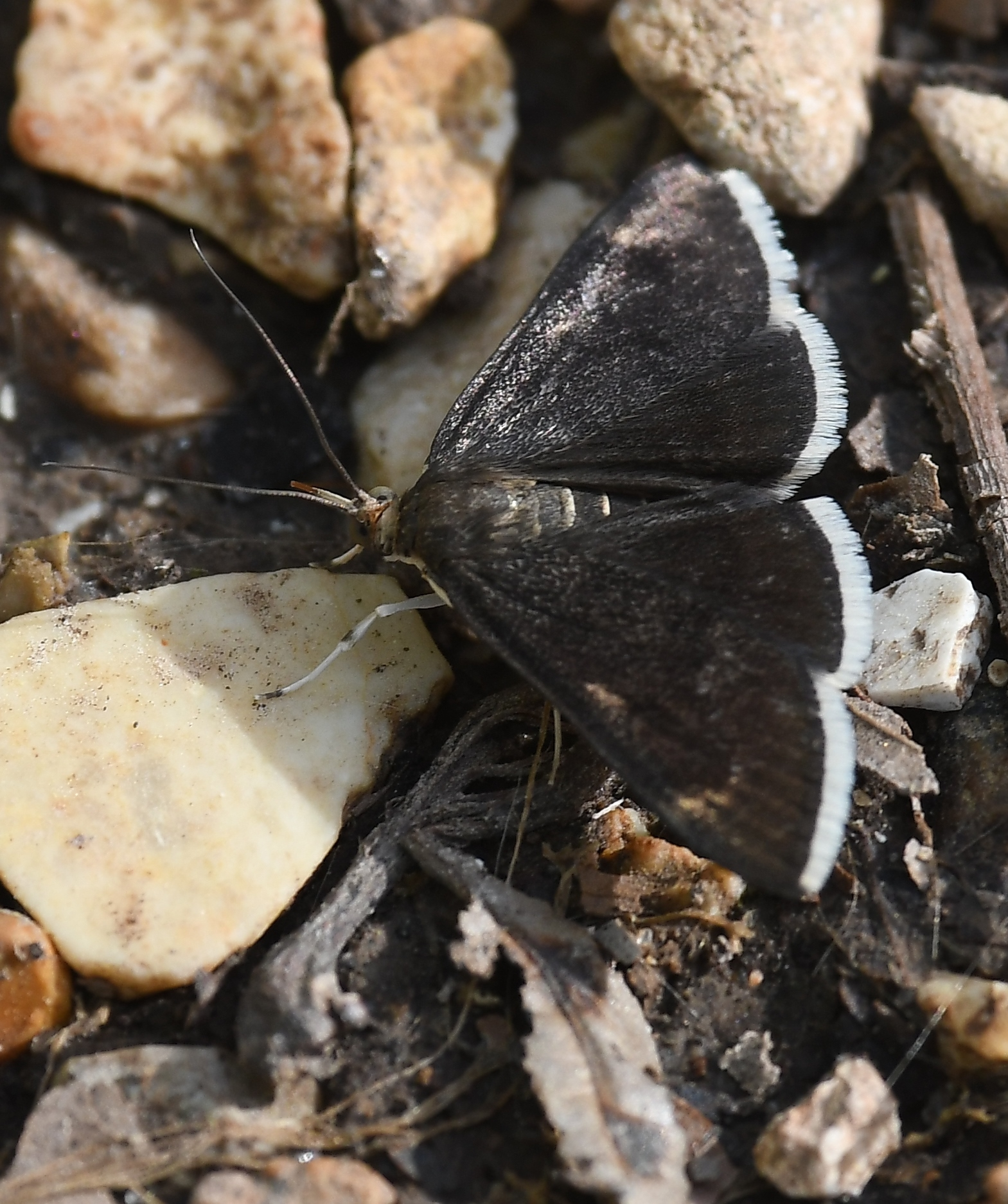

Scientific classification
- Kingdom: Animalia
- Phylum: Arthropoda
- Class: Insecta
- Order: Lepidoptera
- Family: Crambidae
- Genus: Pyrausta
- Species: P. niveicilialis

Binomial name
- Pyrausta niveicilialis (Grote, 1875)

Synonyms
- Botis niveicilialis Grote, 1875

= Pyrausta niveicilialis =

Species of moth

Pyrausta niveicilialis, the white-fringed pyrausta moth, is a moth in the family Crambidae. It was described by Augustus Radcliffe Grote in 1875. It is found in North America, where it has been recorded from southern Canada to Florida and west to Colorado.

The wingspan is about 24 mm. The forewings are dusty blackish, with a yellowish shade in the costal region. Adults are on wing from March to October.
