= Pyrausta mitis =

Scientific classification
- Kingdom: Animalia
- Phylum: Arthropoda
- Class: Insecta
- Order: Lepidoptera
- Family: Crambidae
- Genus: Pyrausta
- Species: P. mitis

Binomial name
- Pyrausta mitis (Butler, 1883)

Synonyms
- Orobena mitis Butler, 1883

Species of moth

Pyrausta mitis is a moth in the family Crambidae. It is found in Chile.
