= Pyrausta germanalis =

Scientific classification
- Kingdom: Animalia
- Phylum: Arthropoda
- Class: Insecta
- Order: Lepidoptera
- Family: Crambidae
- Genus: Pyrausta
- Species: P. germanalis

Binomial name
- Pyrausta germanalis (Herrich-Schäffer, 1871)

Synonyms
- Botys germanalis Herrich-Schäffer, 1871

Species of moth

Pyrausta germanalis is a moth in the family Crambidae. It is found in Cuba.
