= Pyrausta triphaenalis =

Scientific classification
- Kingdom: Animalia
- Phylum: Arthropoda
- Class: Insecta
- Order: Lepidoptera
- Family: Crambidae
- Genus: Pyrausta
- Species: P. triphaenalis

Binomial name
- Pyrausta triphaenalis (Snellen, 1901)

Synonyms
- Botys triphaenalis Snellen, 1901; Pyrausta tryphaenalis

Species of moth

Pyrausta triphaenalis is a moth in the family Crambidae. It is found in Chile.
