= Pyrausta amboinalis =

Scientific classification
- Domain: Eukaryota
- Kingdom: Animalia
- Phylum: Arthropoda
- Class: Insecta
- Order: Lepidoptera
- Family: Crambidae
- Genus: Pyrausta
- Species: P. amboinalis

Binomial name
- Pyrausta amboinalis (Pagenstecher, 1884)

Synonyms
- Botys amboinalis Pagenstecher, 1884

Species of moth

Pyrausta amboinalis is a moth in the family Crambidae. It was described by Pagenstecher in 1884. It is found on Ambon Island.
