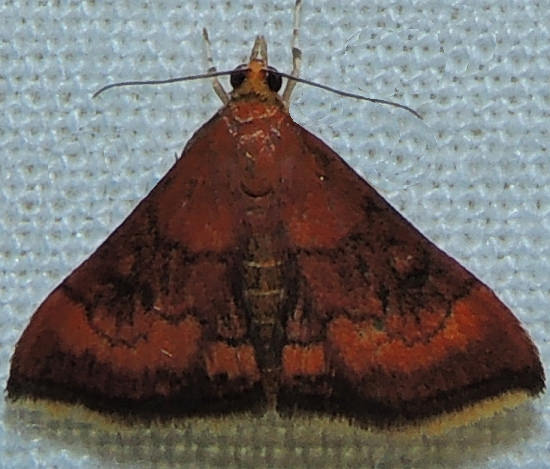

Scientific classification
- Kingdom: Animalia
- Phylum: Arthropoda
- Clade: Pancrustacea
- Class: Insecta
- Order: Lepidoptera
- Family: Crambidae
- Genus: Pyrausta
- Species: P. rubricalis

Binomial name
- Pyrausta rubricalis Hübner, 1796

Synonyms
- Pyrausta rubricallis; Botys similalis Lederer, 1863; Rhodaria nescalis Walker, 1859

= Pyrausta rubricalis =

Species of moth

Pyrausta rubricalis, the variable reddish pyrausta moth, is a moth in the family Crambidae. It was described by Jacob Hübner in 1796. It is found in North America, where it has been recorded from Illinois to New York, south to Florida and Louisiana. It is also reported from the west coast, from southern California to Washington. The wingspan is about 15 mm and adults have been recorded on wing from March to October.

== Images ==
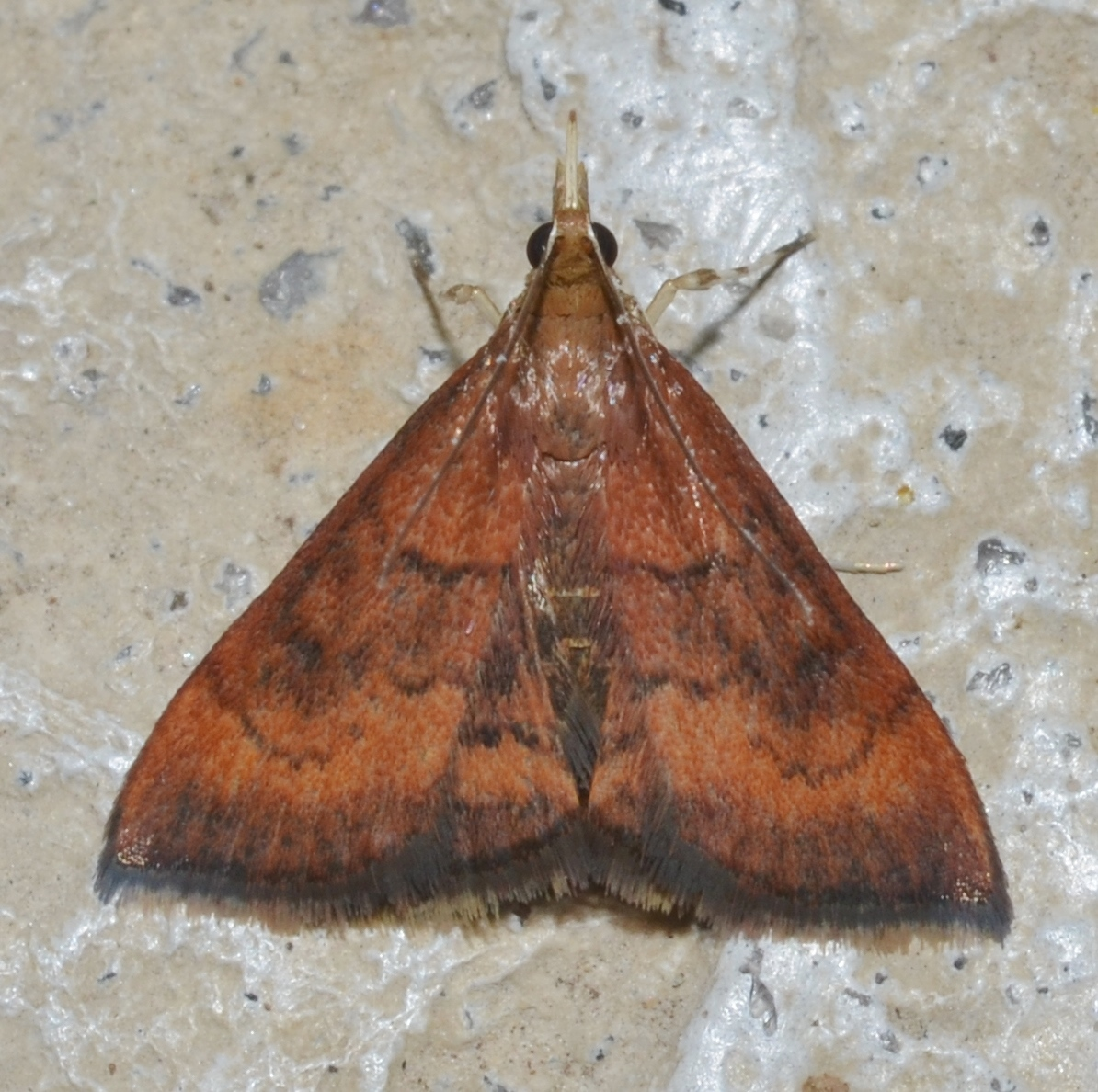

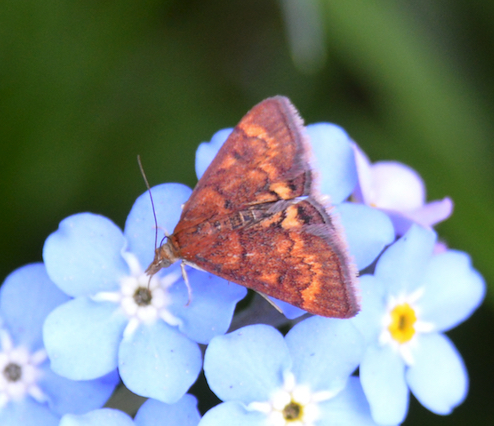

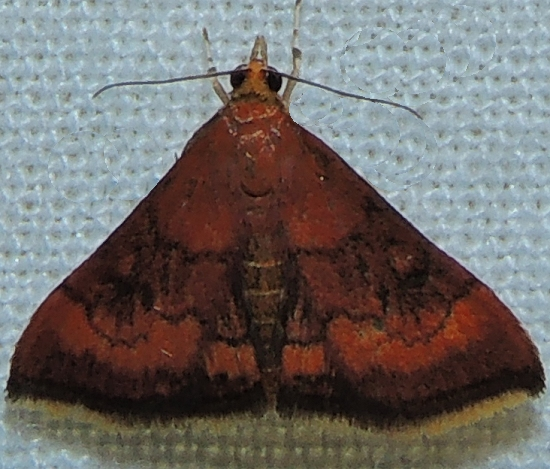
