= Pyrausta coactalis =

Scientific classification
- Kingdom: Animalia
- Phylum: Arthropoda
- Class: Insecta
- Order: Lepidoptera
- Family: Crambidae
- Genus: Pyrausta
- Species: P. coactalis

Binomial name
- Pyrausta coactalis (Snellen, 1890)

Synonyms
- Botys coactalis Snellen, 1890

Species of moth

Pyrausta coactalis is a moth in the family Crambidae. It was described by Snellen in 1890. It is found in India (Darjeeling).
