= Pyrausta griveaudalis =

Scientific classification
- Kingdom: Animalia
- Phylum: Arthropoda
- Class: Insecta
- Order: Lepidoptera
- Family: Crambidae
- Genus: Pyrausta
- Species: P. griveaudalis

Binomial name
- Pyrausta griveaudalis Viette, 1978

Species of moth

Pyrausta griveaudalis is a moth in the family Crambidae. It was described by Viette in 1978. It is found in Madagascar.
