= Pyrausta acrobasella =

Scientific classification
- Domain: Eukaryota
- Kingdom: Animalia
- Phylum: Arthropoda
- Class: Insecta
- Order: Lepidoptera
- Family: Crambidae
- Genus: Pyrausta
- Species: P. acrobasella

Binomial name
- Pyrausta acrobasella Rebel, 1915

Species of moth

Pyrausta acrobasella is a moth in the family Crambidae. It was described by Rebel in 1915.
