= Pyrausta inglorialis =

Scientific classification
- Kingdom: Animalia
- Phylum: Arthropoda
- Class: Insecta
- Order: Lepidoptera
- Family: Crambidae
- Genus: Pyrausta
- Species: P. inglorialis

Binomial name
- Pyrausta inglorialis (Hampson, 1900)

Synonyms
- Cybolomia inglorialis Hampson, 1900

Species of moth

Pyrausta inglorialis is a moth in the family Crambidae. It was described by George Hampson in 1900. It is found in Iran and Uzbekistan.
