= Pyrausta pulchripictalis =

Scientific classification
- Kingdom: Animalia
- Phylum: Arthropoda
- Class: Insecta
- Order: Lepidoptera
- Family: Crambidae
- Genus: Pyrausta
- Species: P. pulchripictalis

Binomial name
- Pyrausta pulchripictalis (Hampson, 1895)

Synonyms
- Pionea pulchripictalis Hampson, 1895

Species of moth

Pyrausta pulchripictalis is a moth in the family Crambidae. It was described by George Hampson in 1895. It is found in Grenada.
