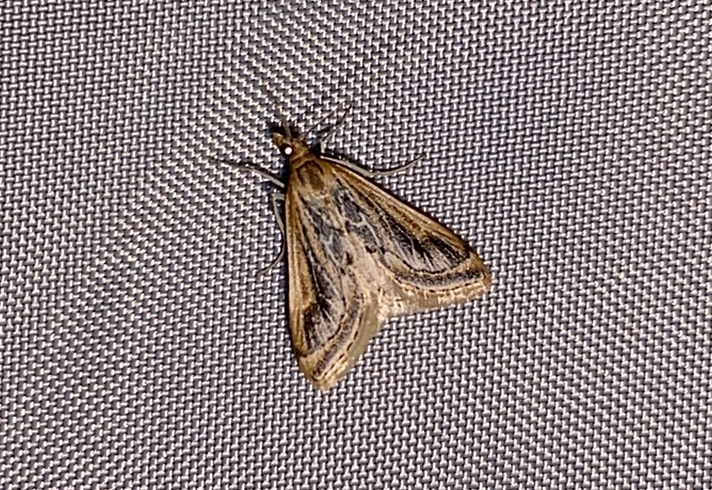

Scientific classification
- Domain: Eukaryota
- Kingdom: Animalia
- Phylum: Arthropoda
- Class: Insecta
- Order: Lepidoptera
- Family: Crambidae
- Genus: Pyrausta
- Species: P. ochreicostalis

Binomial name
- Pyrausta ochreicostalis Barnes & McDunnough, 1918

= Pyrausta ochreicostalis =

Species of moth

Pyrausta ochreicostalis is a moth in the family Crambidae. It was described by William Barnes and James Halliday McDunnough in 1918. It is found in North America, where it has been recorded from California and Nevada.

The wingspan is about 18 mm. The forewings are ocherous along the costa and through the cell. The remainder of the wing is deep blue gray. The hindwings are hyaline whitish, shaded with smoky at the outer margin. Adults have been recorded on wing from April to May and in October.
