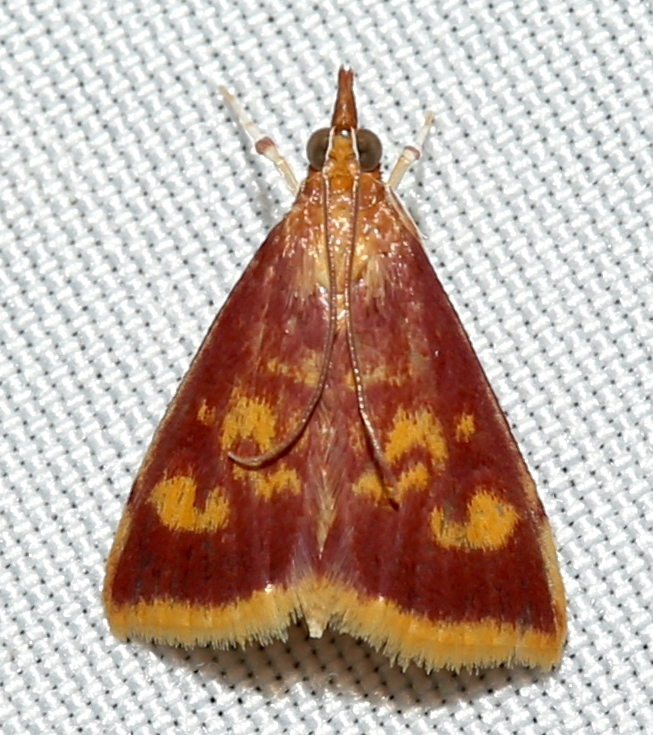

Scientific classification
- Kingdom: Animalia
- Phylum: Arthropoda
- Clade: Pancrustacea
- Class: Insecta
- Order: Lepidoptera
- Family: Crambidae
- Genus: Pyrausta
- Species: P. acrionalis

Binomial name
- Pyrausta acrionalis (Walker, 1859)

Synonyms
- Rhodaria acrionalis Walker, 1859; Botis rufifimbrialis Grote, 1881; Botys haruspica Grote & Robinson, 1867; Botys proceralis Lederer, 1863; Pyrausta sumptuosalis Walker, 1866; Rhodaria acuphisalis Walker, 1859

= Pyrausta acrionalis =

Species of moth

Pyrausta acrionalis, the mint-loving pyrausta moth, is a moth of the family Crambidae. It is found in eastern North America, including Alabama, Georgia, Massachusetts, Mississippi, New Hampshire, New York, Ontario, Tennessee, West Virginia and Wisconsin.

The wingspan is 14–18 mm.

The larvae feed on the leaves of Mentha species.
