= Pyrausta decetialis =

Scientific classification
- Domain: Eukaryota
- Kingdom: Animalia
- Phylum: Arthropoda
- Class: Insecta
- Order: Lepidoptera
- Family: Crambidae
- Genus: Pyrausta
- Species: P. decetialis

Binomial name
- Pyrausta decetialis H. Druce, 1895

Species of moth

Pyrausta decetialis is a moth in the family Crambidae. It was described by Herbert Druce in 1895. It is found in Costa Rica.
