= Pyrausta maenialis =

Scientific classification
- Domain: Eukaryota
- Kingdom: Animalia
- Phylum: Arthropoda
- Class: Insecta
- Order: Lepidoptera
- Family: Crambidae
- Genus: Pyrausta
- Species: P. maenialis

Binomial name
- Pyrausta maenialis Oberthür, 1894

Species of moth

Pyrausta maenialis is a moth in the family Crambidae. It was described by Oberthür in 1894. It is found in China (Tibet).
