= Pyrausta klotsi =

Scientific classification
- Domain: Eukaryota
- Kingdom: Animalia
- Phylum: Arthropoda
- Class: Insecta
- Order: Lepidoptera
- Family: Crambidae
- Genus: Pyrausta
- Species: P. klotsi

Binomial name
- Pyrausta klotsi Munroe, 1976

Species of moth

Pyrausta klotsi is a moth in the family Crambidae, described by Eugene G. Munroe in 1976. It lives in North America, where it has been recorded from southern Arizona, New Mexico and Texas.
