= Pyrausta deidamialis =

Scientific classification
- Kingdom: Animalia
- Phylum: Arthropoda
- Class: Insecta
- Order: Lepidoptera
- Family: Crambidae
- Genus: Pyrausta
- Species: P. deidamialis

Binomial name
- Pyrausta deidamialis (H. Druce, 1895)

Synonyms
- Hyalorista deidamialis H. Druce, 1895

Species of moth

Pyrausta deidamialis is a species of moth in the family Crambidae. It was described by Herbert Druce in 1895. It is found in Mexico (especially Xalapa, Veracruz), Costa Rica and Panama.
