= List of Lepidoptera of Puerto Rico =

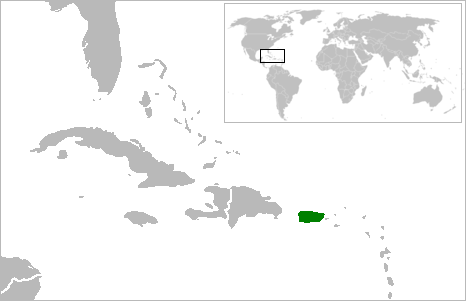
Location of Puerto Rico

The Lepidoptera of Puerto Rico consists of both the butterflies and moths recorded from the island of Puerto Rico.

According to a recent estimate, there are about 1000 Lepidoptera species present in Puerto Rico.

== Butterflies ==
=== Hesperiidae ===
- Achlyodes thraso sagra Evans, 1953
- Astraptes anaphus anausis (Godman & Salvin, 1896)
- Astraptes talus (Cramer, 1777)
- Atalopedes mesogramma apa Comstock, 1944
- Calpodes ethlius (Stoll, 1782)
- Choranthus borinconus (Watson, 1937)
- Choranthus haitensis Skinner, 1920
- Choranthus vitellius (Fabricius, 1793)
- Cymaenes tripunctus tripunctus (Herrich-Shaffer, 1865)
- Epargyreus zestos (Geyer, 1832)
- Ephyriades arcas philemon (Fabricius, 1775)
- Ephyriades zephodes (Hübner, 1825)
- Euphyes singularis insolata (Butler, 1878)
- Gesta gesta gesta Herrich-Schäffer, 1863
- Hylephila phileus phileus (Drury, 1773)
- Nyctelius nyctelius nyctelius (Latreille, 1823)
- Panoquina nero belli Watson, 1937
- Panoquina ocola (Edwards, 1863)
- Panoquina panoquinoides panoquinoides (Skinner, 1892)
- Panoquina sylvicola woodruffi Watson, 1937
- Perichares philetes philetes (Gmeling, 1790)
- Phocides pigmalion bicolora (Boddaert, 1783)
- Polites vibex dictynna (Godman & Salvin, 1896)
- Polygonus leo savigny (Latreille, 1824)
- Proteides mercurius pedro (Dewitz, 1877)
- Pyrgus oileus oileus (Linnaeus, 1767)
- Pyrrchocalles antigua antigua (Herrich-Shaffer, 1863)
- Urbanus dorantes cramptoni Comstock, 1944
- Urbanus proteus domingo (Scudder, 1872)
- Wallengrenia druryi druryi (Latreille, 1824)

=== Lycaenidae ===
- Allosmaitia fidena (Hewitson, 1867)
- Chlorostrymon maesites maesites (Herrich-Shaeffer, 1864)
- Chlorostrymon simaethis simaethis (Drury, 1770)
- Echinargus isola isola (Reakirt, 1866)
- Electrostrymon angelia boyeri (Comstock & Huntington, 1943)
- Hemiargus hanno watsoni Comstock & Huntington, 1943
- Hemiargus thomasi noelli Comstock & Huntington, 1943
- Hemiargus woodruffi Comstock & Huntington, 1943
- Leptotes cassius theonus (Lucas, 1857)
- Nesiostrymon celida aibonito (Comstock & Huntington, 1943)
- Pseudochrysops bornoi (Comstock & Huntington, 1943)
- Strumon limenia (Hewitson, 1868)
- Strymon acis mars (Fabricius, 1777)
- Strymon bubastus pence (Comstock & Huntington, 1943)
- Strymon columella arecibo (Comstock & Huntington, 1943)

=== Nymphalidae ===
- Adelpha arecosa (Hewitson, 1847)
- Anaea troglodyte borinquenalis Johnson & Comstock, 1941
- Anartia jatrophae semifusca Munroe, 1942
- Antillea pelops pelops (Drury, 1770)
- Asterocampa lycaon idyja (Geyer, 1828)
- Atlantea tulita (Dewitz, 1877)
- Biblis hyperia hyperia (Cramer, 1779)
- Calisto nubila Lathy, 1899
- Colobura dirce wolcotti Comstock, 1942
- Danaus eresimus eresimus (Cramer, 1777)
- Danaus gilippus cleothera (Godart, 1820)
- Danaus plexippus plexippus (Linnaeus, 1758)
- Danaus plexippus portoricensis (Clark, 1941)
- Dione vanillae insularis (Maynard, 1889)
- Dryas iulia iulia (Fabricius, 1775)
- Eunica monima (Stoll, 1782)
- Eunica tatila tatilista Kaye, 1926
- Euptoieta claudia claudia (Cramer, 1775)
- Euptoieta hegesia watsoni Comstock, 1944
- Hamadryas ferox diasia (Fruhstorfer, 1916)
- Heliconius charitonius charitonius (Linnaeus, 1767)
- Heliconius melphis melphis Godart, 1819
- Helioconius charitonius punctatus (Hall, 1936)
- Hipolinmas misippus (Linnaeus, 1764)
- Historis acheronta cadmus (Cramer, 1775)
- Historis odius odius (Fabricius, 1775)
- Hypanartia paullus (Fabricius, 1793)
- Libytheana terena (Godart, 1819)
- Lycorea ceres cleobaea (Godart, 1820)
- Marpesia chiron (Fabricius, 1775)
- Marpesia petreus thetys (Fabricius, 1777)
- Precis evarete michaelesi Munroe, 1951
- Prepona amphitoe amphitoe (Godart, 1823)
- Siderone nemesis (Illiger, 1801)
- Siproeta stelenes stelenes (Linnaeus, 1758)
- Vanessa cardui cardui (Linnaeus, 1758)
- Vanessa virginiensis (Drury, 1770)

=== Papilionidae ===
- Battus polydamas thyamus (Rothschild & Jordan, 1906)
- Papilio aristodemus aristodemus Esper, 1794
- Papilio androgeus epidaurus Godman & Salvin, 1890
- Papilio pelaus imerius Godart, 1819

=== Pieridae ===
- Anteos maerula maerula (Fabricius, 1775)
- Aphrissa godartiana (Swainson, 1821)
- Aphrissa statira cubana d'Almeida, 1939
- Appias drusilla boydi Comstock, 1943
- Appias punctifera d'Almeida. 1939
- Ascia josephina krugii (Dewitz, 1877)
- Ascia monuste eubotea (Godart, 1819)
- Dismorphia spio (Latreille, 1819)
- Eurema daira palmira (Poey, 1851)
- Eurema elathea elathea (Cramer, 1777)
- Eurema leuce sanjuanensis Watson, 1938
- Eurema lisa euterpe (Ménétriés, 1832)
- Eurema nicippe (Cramer), 1779
- Eurema portoricensis (Dewitz, 1877)
- Kricogonia castalia (Fabricius, 1793)
- Phoebis agarithe antillia Brown, 1929
- Phoebis argante martini Comstock, 1944
- Phoebis philea philea (Johanson, 1763)
- Phoebis sennae sennae (Linnaeus, 1758)
- Phoebis trite watsoni Brown, 1929

== Moths ==
=== Nepticulidae ===
- Stigmella gossypii Forbes & Leonard, 1930

=== Tischeriidae ===
- Astrotischeria heliopsisella Chambers, 1875

=== Tineidae ===
- Antipolistes anthracella Forbes, 1933
- Erechthias minuscula (Walsingham, 1897)
- Ereunetis aeneoalbida Walsingham, 1897
- Ereunetis particolor Walsingham
- Eudarcia argyrophaea (Forbes, 1931)
- Eudarcia tischeriella (Walsingham, 1897)
- Haplotinea insectella (Fabricius, 1794)
- Infurcitinea luteella Forbes, 1931
- Infurcitinea palpella Forbes, 1931
- Lepyrotica brevistrigata Walsingham, 1897
- Mea incudella Forbes, 1931
- Mea yunquella Forbes, 1931
- Niditinea fuscella (Linnaeus, 1758)
- Protodarcia plumella (Walsingham, 1892)
- Taeniodictys sericella Forbes, 1933
- Tinea familiaris Zeller, 1877
- Tinea minutella (Fabricius, 1794)
- Tinea pallidorsella (Zeller, 1877)
- Tinea scythropiella Walsingham, 1897
- Tineola walsinghami Busck, 1933
- Tiquadra aeneonivella (Walker, 1864)
- Urodus mirella Möschler, 1890
- Xystrologa antipathetica (Forbes, 1931)

=== Acrolophidae ===
- Acrolophus arcanella (Clemens, 1859)
- Acrolophus harpasen Forbes, 1931
- Acrolophus ochracea (Möschler, 1890)
- Acrolophus plumifrontella (Clemens, 1859)
- Acrolophus triatomellus Walsingham, 1897
- Acrolophus triformellus Forbes, 1930
- Acrolophus vitellus Poey, 1832
- Acrolophus walsinghami Möschler, 1890

=== Psychidae ===
- Cryptothelea nigrita (Barnes & McDunnough, 1913)
- Oiketicus kirbyi Guilding, 1827

=== Lyonetiidae ===
- Leucoptera coffeella (Guérin-Méneville, 1842)

=== Gracillariidae ===
- Acrocercops albomarginatum (Walsingham, 1897)
- Acrocercops cymella Forbes, 1931
- Acrocercops inconspicua Forbes, 1930
- Acrocercops pontifica Forbes, 1931
- Acrocercops zebrulella Forbes, 1931
- Caloptilia aeneocapitella (Walsingham, 1891)
- Dialectica rendalli (Walsingham, 1897)
- Dialectica sanctaecrucis (Walsingham, 1897)
- Eucosmorpha dives Walsingham, 1897
- Phyllocnistis citrella Stainton, 1856
- Spanioptila spinosum Walsingham, 1897

=== Ethmiidae ===
- Ethmia joviella Walsingham, 1897
- Ethmia kirbyi Möschler, 1890
- Ethmia nivosella (Walker, 1864)

=== Alucitidae ===
- Alucita montana Barnes & Lindsey, 1921
- Orneodes eudactyla (Felder & Rogenhofer, 1877)

=== Blastobasidae ===
- Auximobasis constans Walsingham, 1897
- Auximobasis insularis Walsingham, 1897
- Auximobasis variolata Walsingham, 1897
- Blastobasis subolivacea Walsingham, 1897

=== Coleophoridae ===
- Pammeces picticornis Walsingham, 1897
- Coleophora pulchricornis Walsingham, 1897

=== Batrachedridae ===
- Homaledra sabalella (Chambers, 1880)

=== Cosmopterygidae ===
- Aphanosara planistes Forbes, 1931
- Batrachedra albistrigella Möschler, 1890
- Cosmopterix astrapias Walsingham, 1909
- Cosmopterix attenuatella (Walker, 1864)
- Cosmopterix carpo Koster, 2010
- Cosmopterix gemmiferella Clemens, 1860
- Cosmopterix interfracta Meyrick, 1922
- Cosmopterix similis Walsingham, 1897
- Cosmopterix vanderwolfi Koster, 2010
- Ithome curvipunctella (Walsingham, 1892)
- Ithome fuscula Forbes, 1931
- Ithome pernigrella (Forbes, 1931)
- Pebobs ipomoeae (Busck, 1900)
- Pebobs sanctivincenti (Walsingham, 1892)
- Perimede annulata Busck, 1914
- Perimede purpurescens Forbes, 1931
- Pyroderces stigmatophora (Walsingham, 1897)
- Stilbosis phaeoptera Forbes, 1931
- Triclonella mediocris (Walsingham, 1897)

=== Oecophoridae ===
- Agonopterix argillacea (Walsingham, 1881)
- Mothonica ocellea Forbes, 1930

=== Gelechiidae ===
==== Anomologinae ====
- Monochroa absconditella (Walker, 1864)

==== Gelechiinae ====
- Agnippe evippeella Busck, 1906
- Aristotelia diolcella Forbes, 1931
- Aristotelia lignicolora Forbes, 1931
- Aristotelia penicillata (Walsingham, 1897)
- Aristotelia vagabundella Forbes, 1931
- Chionodes salva (Meyrick, 1925)
- Gelechia exclarella Möschler, 1890
- Keiferia gudmannella (Walsingham, 1897)
- Nicanthes rhodoclea Meyrick, 1928
- Phthorimaea operculella (Zeller, 1873)
- Polyhymno luteostrigella Chambers, 1874
- Recurvaria annulicornis (Walsingham, 1897)
- Recurvaria eromene (Walsingham, 1897)
- Recurvaria kittella (Walsingham, 1897)
- Stegasta bosquella (Chambers, 1875)
- Stegasta capitella (Fabricius, 1794)
- Symmetrischema striatella (Murtfeldt, 1900)
- Telphusa distictella Forbes, 1931
- Telphusa perspicua (Walsingham, 1911)

==== Anacampsinae ====
- Anacampsis insularis Walsingham, 1897
- Anacampsis mangelivora Walsingham, 1897
- Anacampsis meibomiella Forbes, 1931
- Anacampsis melanophaea Forbes, 1931
- Anacampsis picticornis Walsingham, 1897
- Compsolechia plumbeolata (Walsingham, 1897)
- Pectinophora gossypiella (Saunders, 1844)
- Sitotroga cerealella (Olivier, 1789)

==== Dichomeridinae ====
- Brachyacma palpigera (Walsingham, 1891)
- Commatica bifuscella (Forbes, 1931)
- Dichomeris acuminata (Staudinger, 1876)
- Dichomeris indigna (Walsingham, 1892)
- Dichomeris manella (Möschler, 1890)
- Dichomeris melissia Walsingham, 1911
- Dichomeris pectinella (Forbes, 1931)
- Dichomeris piperata (Walsingham, 1892)
- Empedaula rhodocosma (Meyrick, 1914)
- Eunebristis zingarella (Walsingham, 1897)
- Glaucacna iridea Forbes, 1931
- Oecia oecophila (Staudinger, 1876)
- Onebala elliptica (Forbes, 1931)
- Thiotricha sciurella (Walsingham, 1897)

=== Glyphipterygidae ===
- Brenthia elongata Heppner, 1985
- Brenthia hibiscusae Heppner, 1985
- Tortyra aurofasciana (Snellen, 1875)

=== Yponomeutidae ===
- Euarne obligatella Möschler, 1890
- Plutella xylostella (Linnaeus, 1758)
- Urodus sordidata Zeller, 1877
- Yponomeuta triangularis (Möschler, 1890)

=== Heliodinidae ===
- Heliodines quinqueguttata Walsingham, 1897

=== Cossidae ===
- Psychonoctua personalis Grote, 1865

=== Schistonoeidae ===
- Schistonoea fulvidella (Walsingham, 1897)

=== Elachistidae ===
- Ethmia abraxasella (Walker, 1864)
- Ethmia confusella (Walker, 1863)
- Ethmia notatella (Walker, 1863)

=== Tortricidae ===
==== Chlidanotinae ====
- Ardeutica patillae Razowski & Becker, 2011

==== Olethreutinae ====
- Ancylis virididorsana (Möschler, 1890)
- Bactra priapeia (Heinrich, 1923)
- Bactra verutana Zeller, 1875
- Cacocharis canofascia Forbes, 1930
- Crocidosema calvifrons Walsingham, 1891
- Crocidosema longipalpana (Möschler, 1891)
- Crocidosema plebejana Zeller, 1847
- Crocidosema unica Heinrich, 1923
- Cydia albimaculana (Fernald, 1879)
- Cydia fahlbergiana Thunberg, 1797
- Dichrorampha excitana (Möschler, 1890)
- Endothenia hebesana (Walker, 1863)
- Epiblema strenuana (Walker, 1863)
- Episimus argutana (Clemens, 1860)
- Ethelgoda texanana (Walsingham, 1879)
- Eucosma autochthones (Walsingham, 1897)
- Gymnandrosoma aurantianum Lima, 1927
- Gymnandrosoma desotanum (Heinrich, 1926)
- Gymnandrosoma trachycerus Forbes, 1931
- Olethreutes anthracana Forbes, 1931
- Strepsicrates smithiana Walsingham, 1891

==== Tortricinae ====
- Aethesoides distigmatana Walsingham, 1897
- Amorbia effoetana Möschler, 1891
- Apinoglossa comburana Möschler, 1891
- Apotoforma rotundipennis (Walsingham, 1897)
- Cochylis bunteoides Forbes, 1931
- Cochylis parallelana Walsingham, 1879
- Cochylis prolectana Möschler, 1891
- Cochylis tectonicana Möschler, 1891
- Cochylis vicinitana Möschler, 1891
- Coelostathma discopunctana Clemens, 1860
- Drachmobola insignitana Möschler, 1891
- Ewunia gemella Razowski & Becker, 2002
- Lasiothyris puertoricana Razowski & Becker, 2007
- Lorita lepidulana Forbes, 1931
- Maricaona maricaonana Razowski & Becker, 2007
- Platphalonidia subolivacea Walsingham, 1897
- Platynota flavedana Clemens, 1860
- Platynota rostrana (Walker, 1863)
- Saphenista multistrigata Walsingham, 1914
- Saphenista semistrigata Forbes, 1931

=== Megalopygidae ===
- Megalopyge krugii Dewitz, 1877

=== Crambidae ===
==== Acentropinae ====
- Neargyractis moniligeralis Lederer, 1863
- Neargyractis plusialis (Herrich-Schäffer, 1871)
- Parapoynx fluctuosalis (Zeller, 1852)
- Petrophila doriscalis (Schaus, 1940)
- Petrophila opulentalis (Lederer, 1863)
- Petrophila sumptuosalis (Möschler, 1890)

==== Crambinae ====
- Argyria diplomachalis Schaus, 1940
- Argyria lacteella (Fabricius, 1794)
- Cliniodes euphrosinalis Möschler, 1886
- Cliniodes semilunalis Möschler, 1890
- Crambus discludellus (Möschler, 1890)
- Crambus moeschleralis Schaus, 1940
- Crambus quinquareatus Zeller, 1877
- Cyclocena lelex (Cramer, 1777)
- Diatraea saccharalis (Fabricius, 1794)
- Fissicrambus fissiradiellus (Walker, 1863)
- Fissicrambus minuellus (Walker, 1863)
- Fissicrambus profanellus (Walker, 1866)
- Microcrambus biguttellus (Forbes, 1920)
- Microcrambus discludellus (Möschler, 1890)
- Microcrambus elegans (Clemens, 1860)
- Microcausta flavipunctalis Barnes & McDunnough, 1913
- Parapediasia ligonella (Zeller, 1881)
- Urola nivalis (Drury, 1773)

==== Evergestinae ====
- Alatuncusia bergii (Möschler, 1891)
- Chalcoela pegasalis (Walker, 1859)
- Chrysendeton bromachalis (Schaus, 1940)
- Chrysendeton medicinalis (Grote, 1881)
- Chrysendeton miralis (Möschler, 1890)
- Dichogama amabilis Möschler, 1891
- Dichogama colotha Dyar, 1912
- Dichogama fernaldi Möschler, 1889
- Dichogama gudmanni Hedemann
- Dichogama innocua (Fabricius, 1793)
- Dichogama jessicales Schaus, 1940
- Dichogama redtenbacheri Lederer, 1863
- Dicymolomia metalophota (Hampson, 1897)
- Evergestella evincalis Möschler, 1890
- Hellula phidilealis (Walker, 1859)
- Microtheoris ophionalis (Walker, 1859)
- Mimoschinia rufofascialis (Stephens, 1834)
- Mimoschinia thalialis (Walker, 1859)
- Trischistognatha palindialis (Guenée, 1854)
- Trischistognatha pyrenealis (Walker, 1859)

==== Glaphyriinae ====
- Aethiophysa savoralis (Schaus, 1920)
- Glaphyria badierana (Fabricius, 1794)
- Glaphyria dolatalis Möschler, 1890
- Lipocosma hebescalis Möschler, 1890
- Schacontia themis Solis & Goldstein, 2013

==== Musotiminae ====
- Neurophyseta mineolalis (Schaus, 1940)
- Odilla noralis Schaus, 1940
- Undulambia species

==== Pyraustinae ====
- Achyra bifidalis (Fabricius, 1794)
- Achyra nudalis (Hübner, 1796)
- Achyra rantalis (Guenée, 1854)
- Achyra similalis (Guenée, 1854)
- Agathodes designalis Guenée, 1854
- Apilocrosis pimalis (Barnes & Benjamin, 1926)
- Apogeshna infirmalis (Möschler, 1886)
- Apogeshna stenialis (Guenée, 1854)
- Araschnopsis subulalis (Guenée, 1854)
- Asciodes denticulinea (Schaus, 1940)
- Asciodes gordialis Guenée, 1854
- Ategumia ebulealis (Guenée, 1854)
- Atomopteryx pterophoralis (Walker, 1866)
- Atomopteryx serpentifera (Hampson, 1913)
- Azochis euvexalis Möschler, 1890
- Azochis rufidiscalis Hampson, 1904
- Bicilia iarchasalis (Walker, 1859)
- Blepharomastix aguirrealis (Schaus, 1940)
- Blepharomastix differentialis (Dyar, 1914)
- Blepharomastix ranalis (Guenée, 1854)
- Conchylodes concinnalis Hampson, 1898
- Conchylodes diptheralis (Geyer, 1832)
- Condylorrhiza oculatalis (Möschler, 1890)
- Condylorrhiza vestigialis (Guenée, 1854)
- Crocidocnemis pellucidalis Möschler, 1890
- Cryptobotys zoilusalis (Walker, 1859)
- Desmia ceresalis Walker, 1859
- Desmia naclialis Snellen
- Desmia ploralis (Guenée, 1854)
- Desmia recurvalis Schaus, 1940
- Desmia stenizonalis Hampson, 1912
- Desmia tages (Cramer, 1777)
- Desmia ufeus (Cramer, 1777)
- Diacme elealis (Walker, 1859)
- Diacme mopsalis (Walker, 1859)
- Diaphania costata (Fabricius, 1775)
- Diaphania elegans Möschler, 1890
- Diaphania fuscicaudalis (Möschler, 1881)
- Diaphania hyalinata (Linnaeus, 1767)
- Diaphania immaculalis (Guenée, 1854)
- Diaphania infernalis Möschler, 1890
- Diaphania infimalis (Guenée, 1854)
- Diaphania lucidalis (Hübner, 1823)
- Diaphania nitidalis (Stoll, 1781)
- Diaphantania ceresalis (Walker, 1859)
- Diasemiopsis leodocusalis (Walker, 1859)
- Diasemiopsis ramburialis (Duponchel, 1833)
- Diathrausta yunquealis Schaus, 1940
- Epicorsia oedipodalis (Guenée, 1854)
- Epipagis algarrobolis (Schaus, 1940)
- Ercta vittata (Fabricius, 1794)
- Eulepte anticostalis (Grote, 1871)
- Eulepte concordalis Hübner, 1825
- Eulepte inguinalis (Guenée, 1854)
- Glyphodes sibillalis Walker, 1859
- Herpetogramma bipunctalis (Fabricius, 1794)
- Herpetogramma fluctuosalis (Lederer, 1863)
- Herpetogramma infuscalis (Guenée, 1854)
- Herpetogramma phaeopteralis (Guenée, 1854)
- Hileithia ductalis Möschler, 1890
- Hoterodes ausonia (Cramer, 1779)
- Hymenia perspectalis (Hübner, 1796)
- Isocentris amoenalis (Walker)
- Lamprosema memoralis Schaus, 1940
- Lineodes gracilalis (Herrich-Schäffer, 1871)
- Lineodes metagrammalis Möschler, 1890
- Lineodes triangulalis Möschler, 1890
- Loxomorpha cambogialis (Guenée, 1854)
- Loxomorpha flavidissimalis (Grote, 1878)
- Lygropia imparalis (Walker)
- Lygropia joasharia Schaus, 1940
- Lygropia joelalis Schaus, 1940
- Lygropia tripunctata (Fabricius, 1794)
- Marasmia cochrusalis (Walker, 1859)
- Marasmia trapezalis (Guenée, 1854)
- Maruca testulalis (Geyer, 1832)
- Maruca vitrata (Fabricius, 1787)
- Microphysetica hermeasalis (Walker, 1859)
- Microthyris anormalis (Guenée, 1854)
- Microthyris prolongalis (Guenée, 1854)
- Neoleucinodes prophetica (Dyar, 1914)
- Neoleucinodes torvis Capps, 1948
- Oenobotys glirialis (Herrich-Schäffer, 1871)
- Oenobotys vinotinctalis (Hampson, 1895)
- Omiodes humeralis Guenée, 1854
- Omiodes indicata (Fabricius, 1775)
- Omiodes martyralis (Lederer, 1863)
- Omiodes simialis Guenée, 1854
- Ommatospila narcaeusalis (Walker, 1859)
- Palpita flegia (Cramer, 1777)
- Palpita isoscelalis (Guenée, 1854)
- Palpita quadristigmalis (Guenée, 1854)
- Pantographa limata (Grote & Robinson, 1867)
- Penestola bufalis (Guenée, 1854)
- Phaedropsis placendalis (Möschler, 1890)
- Phaedropsis principaloides (Möschler, 1890)
- Phostria originalis Lederer
- Pilocrocis hesperialis (Herrich-Schäffer)
- Pilocrocis ramentalis Lederer, 1863
- Pleuroptya silicalis (Guenée, 1854)
- Polygrammodes elevata (Fabricius, 1794)
- Portentomorpha xanthialis (Guenée, 1854)
- Psara dryalis (Walker, 1859)
- Psara obscuralis (Lederer, 1863)
- Psara pertentalis Möschler, 1890
- Pseudopyrausta acutangulalis (Snellen, 1875)
- Pyrausta cardinalis (Guenée, 1854)
- Pyrausta cerata (Fabricius)
- Pyrausta episcopalis (Herrich-Schäffer)
- Pyrausta gentillalis Schaus, 1940
- Pyrausta gracilalis (Herrich-Schäffer)
- Pyrausta illutalis (Möschler)
- Pyrausta insignitalis (Guenée, 1854)
- Pyrausta laresalis Schaus, 1940
- Pyrausta phoenicealis (Walker, 1859)
- Pyrausta phyllidalis Schaus, 1940
- Pyrausta tyralis (Guenée, 1854)
- Pyrausta votanalis Schaus, 1940
- Rhectocraspeda periusalis (Walker, 1859)
- Salbia cassidalis Guenée, 1854
- Salbia cognatalis (Snellen, 1875)
- Salbia haemorrhoidalis Guenée, 1854
- Salbia varanalis Schaus, 1940
- Samea carettalis Schaus, 1940
- Samea conjunctalis Möschler, 1890
- Samea ecclesialis Guenée, 1854
- Samea mictalis Hampson, 1912
- Samea multuplicalis (Guenée, 1854)
- Sathria internitalis (Guenée, 1854)
- Sathria onophasalis (Walker, 1859)
- Sisyracera inabsconsalis (Möschler, 1890)
- Sisyracera contortilinealis (Hampson, 1895)
- Spoladea recurvalis (Fabricius, 1794)
- Steniodes declivalis (Dyar. 1914)
- Syllepis marialis Poey, 1832
- Syllepte belialis (Walker, 1859)
- Syllepte imbroglialis Dyar, 1914
- Syllepte patagialis Zeller, 1852
- Synclera jarbusalis Walker, 1859)
- Synclera traducalis (Zeller, 1852)
- Syngamia florella (Stoll, 1781)
- Terastia meticulosalis Guenée, 1854
- Triuncidia eupalusalis (Walker, 1859)
- Udea albipunctalis Dognin, 1905
- Udea rubigalis (Guenée, 1854)
- Udea secernalis (Möschler, 1890)
- Uresiphita reversalis (Guenée, 1854)

==== Schoenobiinae ====
- Rupela leucatea (Zeller, 1863)

==== Scopariinae ====
- Elusia enalis Schaus, 1940

==== Spilomelinae ====
- Arthromastix lauralis (Walker, 1859)
- Asturodes fimbriauralis (Guenée, 1854)
- Bradina hemmingalis Schaus, 1940
- Ceratoclasis delimitalis (Guenée, 1854)
- Prenesta quadrifenestralis (Herrich-Schäffer)
- Pycnarmon receptalis (Walker, 1859)
- Sparagmia gigantalis Guenée, 1854
- Sparagmia gonoptera Guenée, 1854
- Sufetula sacchari (Seín, 1930)
- Trichaea flammeolalis (Möschler, 1890)

=== Pyralidae ===
==== Chrysauginae ====
- Bonchis munitalis (Lederer, 1863)
- Caphys bilineata (Stoll, 1781)
- Carcha hersilialis Walker, 1859
- Epitamyra albomaculalis Möschler, 1890
- Murgisca subductellus (Möschler, 1890)
- Parachma ochracealis Walker, 1866
- Salobrena recurvata (Möschler, 1886)
- Streptopalpia minusculalis (Möschler, 1890)

==== Epipaschiinae ====
- Deuterollyta majuscula Herrich-Schäffer, 1871
- Jocara ragonoti (Möschler, 1890)
- Macalla thyrsisalis Walker, 1859
- Phidotricha insularella (Ragonot, 1889)
- Pococera scabridella (Ragonot, 1899)
- Stericta alnotha (incertae sedis) Schaus, 1922
- Tallula atramentalis (Lederer, 1863)

==== Galleriinae ====
- Achroia grisella (Fabricius, 1794)
- Corcyra cephalonia (Stainton, 1866)
- Galleria mellonella (Linnaeus, 1758)
- Pogrima palmasalis Schaus, 1940

==== Phycitinae ====
- Anabasis ochrodesma (Zeller, 1881)
- Apomyelois decolor (Zeller, 1881)
- Apomyelois muriscis Dyar, 1914
- Cactoblastis cactorum (Berg, 1885)
- Cadra cautella (Walker, 1863)
- Caristanius pellucidella (Ragonot, 1889)
- Chararica bicolorella (Barnes & McDunnough, 1917)
- Crocidomera fissuralis (Walker, 1863)
- Crocidomera turbidella (Zeller, 1848)
- Davara rufulella (Ragonot, 1889)
- Ectomyelois ceratoniae (Zeller, 1839)
- Elasmopalpus lignosellus (Zeller, 1848)
- Etiella zinckenella (Treitschke, 1832)
- Fundella pellucens Zeller, 1848
- Genopaschia protomis Dyar, 1914
- Homalopalpia dalera Dyar, 1914
- Hypsipyla grandella (Zeller, 1848)
- Laetilia portoricensis Dyar, 1915
- Myelois furvidorsella Ragonot
- Nonia exiguella (Ragonot, 1888)
- Oncolabis anticella Zeller, 1848
- Plodia interpunctella (Hübner, 1813)
- Salebria famula (Zeller, 1881)
- Sarasota furculella (Dyar, 1919)
- Ufa rubedinella (Zeller, 1848)
- Unadilla maturella (Zeller, 1881)

==== Pyralinae ====
- Hypsopygia nostralis (Guenée, 1854)
- Micromastra isoldalis Schaus, 1940
- Ocrasa nostralis Guenée, 1854
- Pyralis manihotalis Guenée, 1854

=== Limacodidae ===
- Heuretes picticornis Grote & Robinson, 1868

=== Thyrididae ===
- Banisia myrsusalis (Walker, 1859)
- Rhodoneura species
- Zeuzerodes maculata Warren, 1907

=== Hyblaeidae ===
- Hyblaea puera (Cramer, 1777)

=== Pterophoridae ===
- Adaina bipunctatus Möschler, 1890
- Adaina ipomoeae Bigot & Etienne, 2009
- Adaina participata Möschler, 1890
- Adaina praeusta Möschler, 1890
- Exelastis pumilio (Zeller, 1873)
- Geina integumentum Gielis, 2006
- Geina periscelidactylus (Fitch, 1854)
- Hellinsia inquinatus (Zeller, 1873)
- Hellinsia paleaceus (Zeller, 1873)
- Hellinsia unicolor (Barnes & McDunnough, 1913)
- Lantanophaga pusillidactylus (Walker, 1864)
- Lioptilodes albistriolatus (Zeller, 1871)
- Megalorrhipida leucodactylus (Fabricius, 1794)
- Michaelophorus hodgesi Gielis, 1999
- Michaelophorus margaritae Gielis, 2006
- Ochyrotica fasciata Walsingham, 1891
- Postplatyptilia caribica Gielis, 2006
- Sphenarches caffer (Zeller, 1852)
- Stenoptilodes brevipennis (Zeller, 1874)

=== Geometridae ===
==== Alsophilinae ====
- Almodes terraria Guenée, [1858]
- Ametris nitrocris (Cramer, 1780)

==== Ennominae ====
- Boarmia hilararia (Möschler, 1890)
- Cyclomia mopsaria Guenée, 1857
- Drepanodes infensata Guenée, 1857
- Epimecis hortaria (Fabricius, 1794)
- Erastria decrepitaria (Hübner, [1823])
- Hydatoscia ategua Druce, 1982
- Iridopsis delicata (Butler, 1878)
- Iridopsis idonearia (Walker, 1860)
- Leuciris mysteriotis Prout, 1911
- Leucula simplicaria Guenée, 1858
- Macaria aemulataria Walker, 1861
- Macaria diffusata Walker, 1861
- Melanochroia chephise (Cramer, 1782)
- Moschleria hulstii Möschler, 1890
- Nepheloleuca complicata (Guenée, 1858)
- Nepheloleuca illiturata (Guenée, 1898)
- Nepheloleuca politia (Cramer, 1777)
- Numia terebintharia Guenée, [1858]
- Oxydia vesulia (Cramer, [1779])
- Patalene ephyrata (Guenée, [1858])
- Patalene olyzonaria (Walker, 1860)
- Patalene epionata (Guenée, [1858])
- Pero nerisaria (Walker, 1860)
- Pero rectisectaria (Herrich-Schäffer, [1855])
- Phrygionis auriferaria (Hulst, 1887)
- Phrygionis moeschleri Prout, 1933
- Phrygionis paradoxata (Guenée, [1858])
- Psamatodes abydata (Guenée, 1855)
- Psamatodes everiata (Guenée, [1858])
- Psamatodes nicetaria (Guenée, 1858)
- Psamatodes trientata (Herrich-Schäffer, 1870)
- Sabulodes aegrotata (Guenée, [1858])
- Sabulodes caberata Guenée, 1858
- Sabulodes exhonorata Guenée, 1858
- Semiothisa cellulata (Herrich-Schäffer, 1890)
- Semiothisa increta (Walker, 1861)
- Semiothisa paleolata (Guenée, 1858)
- Semiothisa regulata (Fabricius, 1775)
- Sericoptera virginaria (Hulst, 1886)
- Serraca momaria (Guenée, 1857)
- Sphacelodes vulneraria (Hübner, 1823)
- Thyrinteina arnobia (Stoll, 1782)
- Thysanopyga amarantha Debauche, 1937
- Thysanopyga apicitruncaria Herrich-Schäffer, [1856]

==== Geometrinae ====
- Chloropteryx paularia (Möschler, 1886)
- Hydata insatisfacta Herbulot, 1988
- Oospila confundaria Möschler, 1890
- Phrudocentra centrifugaria (Herrich-Schäffer, 1870)
- Racheospila isolata Warren, 1900
- Racheospila merlinaria Schaus, 1940
- Racheospila sanctaecrucis Prout, 1932
- Synchlora cupedinaria (Grote, 1880)
- Synchlora frondaria Guenée, [1858]
- Synchlora xysteraria (Hulst, 1886)
- Synchlora gerularia (Hübner, [1823])
- Synchlora herbaria (Fabricius, 1794)

==== Larentiinae ====
- Cidaria chloronotata Möschler, 1890
- Disclisioprocta stellata (Guenée, [1858])
- Eois snellenaria Möschler, 1892
- Euphyia moeraria (Guenée, 1858)
- Euphyia perturbata (Walker, 1862)
- Euphyia vinaceata Möschler, 1890
- Eupithecia satyrata (Hübner, [1813])
- Graphidipus aureocapitaria (Möschler, 1890)
- Obila praecurraria (Möschler, 1890)
- Pterocypha defensata Walker, 1862

==== Sterrhinae ====
- Acratodes intamiataria Möschler, 1890
- Acratodes oslinaria Schaus, 1940
- Acratodes praepeditaria Möschler, 1890
- Acratodes virgota (Schaus, 1901)
- Idaea curvicauda Schaus, 1940
- Idaea fernaria (Schaus, 1940)
- Idaea monata (Forbes, [1947])
- Idaea placitaria Schaus, 1940
- Leptostales crossii (Hulst, 1900)
- Leptostales oblinataria (Möschler, 1890)
- Leptostales pannaria (Guenée, [1858])
- Leptostales phorcaria (Guenée, [1858])
- Lobocleta dativaria Schaus, 1940
- Lobocleta maricaria Schaus, 1940
- Lobocleta monogrammata (Guenée, [1858])
- Lobocleta mutuataria (Möschler, 1890)
- Lobocleta perditaria (Walker, 1866)
- Lobocleta tenellata (Möschler, 1886)
- Pleuroprucha asthenaria (Walker, 1861)
- Pleuroprucha molitaria Möschler, 1890
- Pleuroprucha pyrrhularia Möschler, 1890
- Pleuroprucha yunkearia Schaus, 1940
- Pseudasellodes fenestraria (Guenée, 1858)
- Ptychamalia perlata Warren, 1900)
- Scelolophia delectabilaria (Möschler, 1890)
- Scelolophia randaria Schaus, 1940
- Scelolophia terminata (Guenée, 1858)
- Scopula canularia (Herrich-Schäffer, 1870)
- Scopula innominata Schaus, 1940
- Scopula laresaria Schaus, 1940
- Scopula subquadrata (Guenée, [1858])
- Scopula umbilicata (Fabricius, 1794)
- Semaeopus caecaria (Hübner, [1823])
- Semaeopus malefidaria (Möschler, 1890)
- Semaeopus perletaria Möschler, 1890
- Tricentrogyna floridora Schaus, 1940
- Tricentrogyna vinacea (Butler, 1878)

=== Epiplemidae ===
- Epiplema ecludaria Möschler, 1890
- Epiplema ineptaria Möschler, 1890
- Epiplema obvallataria Möschler, 1890
- Letchena myrsusalis Walker
- Nedusia excavata Möschler, 1890
- Syngria ramosaria Möschler, 1890
- Syngria reticularia Möschler, 1890
- Trotorhombia metachromata (Walker, 1861)

=== Sphingidae ===
- Aellopos blaini Herrich-Schäffer, [1869]
- Aellopos fadus (Cramer, 1776)
- Aellopos tantalus (Linnaeus, 1758)
- Aellopos titan (Cramer, 1777)
- Agrius cingulata (Fabricius, 1775)
- Cautethia noctuiformis (Walker, 1856)
- Ceratomia catalpae (Boisduval, 1875)
- Cocytius antaeus (Drury, 1773)
- Enyo lugubris (Linnaeus, 1771)
- Erinnyis alope (Drury, 1770)
- Erinnyis crameri (Schaus, 1898)
- Erinnyis ello (Linnaeus, 1758)
- Erinnyis lassauxii (Boisduval, 1859)
- Erinnyis obscura (Fabricius, 1775)
- Erinnyis oenotrus (Cramer, 1782)
- Eumorpha fasciatus (Sulzer, 1776)
- Eumorpha labruscae (Linnaeus, 1758)
- Eumorpha vitis (Linnaeus, 1758)
- Hyles lineata (Fabricius, 1775)
- Isognathus rimosa (Grote, 1865)
- Madoryx oiclus (Cramer, [1780])
- Manduca brontes (Drury, 1773)
- Manduca florestan (Cramer, 1782)
- Manduca rustica (Fabricius, 1775)
- Manduca sexta (Linnaeus, 1763)
- Neococytius cluentius (Cramer, 1776)
- Pachylia ficus (Linnaeus, 1758)
- Perigonia lusca (Fabricius, 1777)
- Protambulyx strigilis (Linnaeus, 1771)
- Pseudosphinx tetrio (Linnaeus, 1771)
- Xylophanes chiron (Drury, 1771)
- Xylophanes pluto (Fabricius, 1777)
- Xylophanes tersa (Linnaeus, 1771)

=== Notodontidae ===
- Dasychira plagiata (Walker, 1865)
- Heterocampa guttivitta (Walker, 1855)
- Hippia insularis (Grote, 1866)
- Notela jaliscana Schaus, 1901
- Nystalea aequipars (Walker, 1858)
- Nystalea ebalea (Stoll, [1780])
- Nystalea nyseus (Cramer, [1775])
- Nystalea superciliosa (Guenée, 1852)
- Rifargia distinguenda (Walker, 1856)

=== Erebidae ===
==== Herminiinae ====
- Bleptina acastusalis Walker, [1859]
- Bleptina araealis (Hampson, 1901)
- Bleptina caradrinalis Guenée, 1854
- Bleptina hydrillalis Guenée, 1854
- Bleptina menalcasalis Walker, [1859]
- Carteris oculatalis (Möschler, 1890)
- Hypena vetustalis Guenée, 1854
- Hypenula cacuminalis (Walker, 1859)
- Hypenula complectalis (Guenée, 1854)
- Kyneria utuadae Schaus, 1940
- Lascoria alucitalis (Guenée, 1854)
- Lascoria orneodalis (Guenée, 1854)
- Lophophora clanymoides Möschler, 1890
- Mastigophorus demissalis Möschler, 1890
- Mastigophorus jamaicalis Schaus, 1916
- Palthis asopialis (Guenée, 1854)
- Phlyctaina irrigualis Möschler, 1890
- Physula albipunctilla Schaus, 1916
- Physula peckii Möschler, 1890
- Tetanolita floridana (Smith, 1895)
- Tetanolita mutatalis (Möschler, 1890)

==== Hypeninae ====
- Hypena umbralis (Smith, 1884)
- Hypena minualis Guenée, 1854
- Hypena conditalis Möschler, 1890
- Hypena degasalis Walker, 1859
- Hypena exoletalis (Guenée, 1854)
- Hypena lividalis (Hübner, 1796)
- Hypena porrectalis (Fabricius, 1794)
- Lophoditta tuberculata (Herrich-Schäffer, 1870)

==== Rivulinae ====
- Rivula pusilla Möschler, 1890

==== Phytometrinae ====
- Aglaonice hirtipalpis (Walker, [1859])
- Cecharismena cara Möschler, 1890
- Cecharismena nectarea Möschler, 1890
- Glympis concors (Hübner, 1823)
- Glympis eubolialis (Walker, [1866])
- Hormoschista latipalpis (Walker, 1858)
- Mursa subrufa (Warren, 1889)
- Ommatochila mundula (Zeller, 1872)
- Radara nealcesalis (Walker, 1859)

==== Calpinae ====
- Adiopa disgrega (Möschler, 1890)
- Eudocima serpentinfera (Walker, [1858])
- Gonodonta aequalis (Walker, 1857)
- Gonodonta bidens Geyer, 1832
- Gonodonta clotilda (Stoll, [1790])
- Gonodonta incurva (Sepp, [1840])
- Gonodonta nitidimacula Guenée, 1852
- Gonodonta sicheas (Cramer, [1777])
- Gonodonta uxoria (Cramer, 1780)
- Graphigona regina (Guenée, 1852)
- Hemicephalis characteria (Stoll, [1790])
- Hemicephalis krugii Möschler, 1890
- Oraesia excitans Walker, [1858]
- Parachabora abydas (Herrich-Schäffer, [1869])
- Pararcte schneideriana (Stoll, 1782)
- Plusiodonta thomae Guenée, 1852
- Pseudyrias watsoni Schaus, 1940

==== Hypenodinae ====
- Schrankia macula (Druce, 1891)

==== Scoliopteryginae ====
- Alabama argillacea (Hübner, 1823)
- Anomis editrix (Guenée, 1852)
- Anomis erosa Hübner, 1821
- Anomis flava (Fabricius, 1775)
- Anomis gundlachi Schaus, 1940
- Anomis illita (Guenée, 1852)
- Anomis impasta Guenée, 1852

==== Eulepidotinae ====
- Antiblemma andersoni Schaus, 1940
- Antiblemma anhypha (Guenée)
- Antiblemma concinnula (Walker, 1865)
- Antiblemma prisca Möschler, 1890
- Antiblemma rufinans (Guenée, 1852)
- Antiblemma sterope (Stoll, 1780)
- Anticarsia elegantula (Herrich-Schäffer, 1869)
- Anticarsia gemmatalis Hübner, 1818
- Azeta repugnalis (Hübner, 1825)
- Ephyrodes cacata Guenée, 1852
- Epitausa coppryi (Guenée, 1852)
- Eulepidotis addens (Walker, 1858)
- Eulepidotis hebe (Möschler, 1890)
- Eulepidotis juncida (Guenée, 1852)
- Eulepidotis merricki (Holland, 1902)
- Eulepidotis micca (Druce, 1889)
- Eulepidotis modestula (Herrich-Schäffer, 1869)
- Eulepidotis superior (Guenée, 1852)
- Litoprosopus hatuey (Poey, 1832)
- Manbuta pyraliformis (Walker, 1858)
- Massala obvertens (Walker, 1858)
- Metallata absumens (Walker, 1862)
- Phyprosopus fastigiata (Herrich-Schäffer, 1868)
- Renodes aequalis (Walker, 1865)
- Syllectra congemmalis Hübner, 1823
- Syllectra erycata (Cramer, [1780])
- Syllectra lucifer Möschler, 1890

==== Anobinae ====
- Baniana relapsa (Walker, 1858)

==== Erebinae ====
- Achaea ablunaris (Guenée, 1852)
- Ascalapha odorata (Linnaeus, 1758)
- Bendis bayamona Schaus, 1940
- Bendis gurda Guenée
- Bendis magdalia Guenée, 1852
- Dyomyx inferior (Herrich-Schäffer, [1869])
- Epidromia pannosa Guenée, 1852
- Epidromia rotundata (Herrich-Schäffer, 1869)
- Hemeroblemma rengus (Poey, 1832)
- Kakopoda progenies (Guenée, 1852)
- Latebraria amphipyroides Guenée, 1852
- Lesmone formularis (Geyer, 1837)
- Letis mycerina Cramer, 1777
- Melipotis acontioides (Guenée, 1852)
- Melipotis contorta (Guenée, 1852)
- Melipotis famelica (Guenée, 1852)
- Melipotis fasciolaris (Hübner, 1823)
- Melipotis guanicana Schaus, 1940
- Melipotis indomita (Walker, [1858])
- Melipotis januaris (Guenée, 1852)
- Melipotis ochrodes (Guenée, 1852)
- Melipotis perpendicularis (Guenée, 1852)
- Mimophisma forbesi Schaus, 1940
- Mocis antillesia Hampson, 1913
- Mocis disseverans (Walker, 1858)
- Mocis latipes (Guenée, 1852)
- Mocis marcida (Guenée, 1852)
- Mocis megas (Guenée, 1852)
- Mocis repanda (Fabricius, 1794)
- Ophisma tropicalis Guenée, 1852
- Peosina numeria (Drury, 1770)
- Perasia garnoti (Guenée, 1852)
- Perasia helvina (Guenée)
- Ptichodis immunis (Guenée, 1852)
- Safia acharia Stoll, 1781
- Selenisa suero (Cramer, 1779)
- Selenisa sueroides (Guenée, 1852)
- Thysania zenobia (Cramer, [1777])
- Toxonprucha diffundens (Walker, 1858)
- Zale exhausta (Guenée, 1852)
- Zale fictilis (Guenée, 1852)
- Zale setipes (Guenée, 1852)
- Zale strigimacula (Guenée, 1852)

==== Eublemminae ====
- Eublemma basalis (Möschler, 1890)
- Eublemma cinnamomea (Herrich-Schäffer, 1868)
- Eublemma minima (Guenée, 1852)
- Eublemma recta (Guenée, 1852)
- Eublemma sydolia Schaus, 1940

==== Arctiinae ====
- Agylla sericea (Druce, 1885)
- Calidota strigosa (Walker, 1855)
- Composia credula (Fabricius, 1775)
- Correbidia terminalis (Walker, 1856)
- Cosmosoma achemon (Fabricius, 1781)
- Cosmosoma auge (Linnaeus, 1767)
- Ctenuchidia virginalis Forbes, 1930
- Ctenuchidia virgo (Herrich-Schäffer, [1855])
- Empyreuma pugione (Linnaeus, 1767)
- Eunomia rubripunctata (Butler, 1876)
- Eupseudosoma involuta (Sepp, 1849)
- Halysidota cinctipes Grote, 1865
- Horama panthalon (Fabricius, 1793)
- Horama pretus (Cramer, [1777])
- Hyalurga vinosa (Drury, [1773])
- Hypercompe decora (Walker, 1855)
- Hypercompe icasia (Cramer, [1777])
- Hypercompe scribonia (Stoll, 1790)
- Lomuna nigripuncta Hampson, 1900
- Lymire flavicollis (Dewitz)
- Mulona species
- Nyridela chalciope (Hübner, [1831])
- Opharus bimaculata (Dewitz, 1877)
- Paramulona albulata (Herrich-Schäffer, 1866)
- Pareuchaetes insulata (Walker, 1855)
- Phoenicoprocta capistrata (Fabricius, 1775)
- Phoenicoprocta partheni (Fabricius, 1793)
- Progona pallida (Möschler, 1890)
- Trocodima hemiceras (Forbes, 1931)
- Utetheisa ornatrix (Linnaeus, 1758)

=== Euteliidae ===
- Eutelia ablatrix (Guenée, 1852)
- Eutelia furcata (Walker, 1865)
- Eutelia pyrastis Hampson, 1905
- Paectes arcigera (Guenée, 1852)
- Paectes devincta (Walker, 1858)
- Paectes lunodes (Guenée, 1852)
- Paectes obrotunda (Guenée, 1852)

=== Nolidae ===
- Afrida ydatodes Dyar, 1913
- Casandria ferrocana (Walker, 1857)
- Cephalospargeta elongata Möschler, 1890
- Collomena filifera (Walker, 1857)
- Concana mundissima Walker, [1858]
- Garella nilotica (Rogenhofer, 1881)
- Iscadia aperta Walker, 1857
- Motya abseuzalis Walker, 1859
- Mouralia tinctoides (Guenée, 1852)
- Nola bistriga (Möschler, 1890)
- Nola cereella (Bosc, [1800])
- Nola minna Butler, 1881
- Nola portoricensis Möschler, 1890
- Nola sinuata Forbes, 1930
- Stictoptera vitrea Guenée, 1852

=== Noctuidae ===
==== Plusiinae ====
- Agrapha calceolaris (Walker, [1858])
- Argyrogramma verruca (Fabricius, 1794)
- Autoplusia egena (Guenée, 1852)
- Chrysodeixis includens (Walker, [1858])
- Enigmogramma admonens (Walker, [1858])
- Enigmogramma antillea Becker, 2001
- Notioplusia illustrata (Guenée, 1852)
- Trichoplusia ni (Hübner, [1803])

==== Bagisarinae ====
- Amyna axis (Guenée, 1852)
- Amyna bullula (Grote, 1873)
- Bagisara buxea (Grote, 1881)
- Bagisara repanda (Fabricius, 1793)

==== Cydosiinae ====
- Cydosia nobilitella (Cramer, [1780])

==== Eustrotiinae ====
- Cobubatha albipectus Möschler, 1890
- Cobubatha metaspilaris (Walker, 1863)
- Cobubatha putnami Möschler, 1890
- Marimatha botyoides (Guenée, 1852)
- Marimatha nigrofimbria (Guenée, 1852)
- Marimatha operta (Möschler, 1890)
- Marimatha portoricensis (Möschler, 1890)
- Marimatha tripuncta (Möschler, 1890)
- Ozarba cinda Schaus, 1940
- Tripudia coamona (Schaus, 1940)
- Tripudia luxuriosa Smith, 1900
- Tripudia rectangula Pogue, 2009

==== Acontiinae ====
- Anateinoma affabilis Möschler, 1890
- Chobata discalis Walker, [1858]
- Haplostola aphelioides Möschler, 1890
- Ponometia exigua (Fabricius, 1793)
- Spragueia dama (Guenée, 1852)
- Spragueia margana (Fabricius, 1794)
- Spragueia pantherula (Herrich-Schäffer, 1868)
- Spragueia perstructana (Walker, 1865)
- Tarachidia flavibasis Hampson, 1898
- Tarachidia mixta (Möschler, 1890)

==== Diphtherinae ====
- Diphthera festiva (Fabricius, 1775)

==== Acronictinae ====
- Agriopodes jucundella Dyar, 1922

==== Amphipyrinae ====
- Cropia infusa (Walker, [1858])
- Metaponpneumata rogenhoferi Möschler, 1890

==== Oncocnemidinae ====
- Catabenoides vitrina (Walker, 1857)
- Neogalea sunia (Guenée, 1852)

==== Agaristinae ====
- Caularis undulans Walker, [1858]
- Micrathetis triplex (Walker, 1857)
- Neotuerta sabulosa (Felder, 1874)

==== Condicinae ====
- Condica albigera (Guenée, 1852)
- Condica circuita (Guenée, 1852)
- Condica concisa (Walker, 1856)
- Condica cupentia (Cramer, [1799])
- Condica mobilis (Walker, [1857])
- Condica selenosa Guenée, 1852
- Condica sutor (Guenee, 1852)
- Homophoberia apicosa (Haworth, 1809)

==== Heliothinae ====
- Helicoverpa armigera (Hübner, [1805])
- Helicoverpa zea (Boddie, 1850)
- Heliothis virescens (Fabricius, 1777)

==== Eriopinae ====
- Callopistria floridensis (Guenée, 1852)
- Callopistria jamaicensis (Möschler, 1886)

==== Noctuinae ====
- Acroria terens (Walker, 1857)
- Agrotis apicalis Herrich-Schäffer, 1868
- Agrotis malefida Guenée, 1852
- Anicla infecta (Ochsenheimer, 1816)
- Bryolymnia huastea Schaus, 1940
- Cobaliodes tripunctus Hübner
- Dypterygia punctirena (Walker, 1857)
- Elaphria agrotina (Guenée, 1852)
- Elaphria andersoni Schaus, 1940
- Elaphria arnoides (Herrich-Schäffer, [1869])
- Elaphria chalcedonia (Hübner, 1803)
- Elaphria deltoides (Möschler, 1880)
- Elaphria nucicolora (Guenée, 1852)
- Elaphria promiscua Möschler, 1880
- Elaphria subobliqua (Walker, 1858)
- Eriopyga adjuntasa Schaus, 1940
- Feltia repleta (Walker, 1857)
- Feltia subterranea (Fabricius, 1794)
- Galgula partita Guenée, 1852
- Gonodes liquida (Möschler, 1886)
- Hadena ligata Möschler, 1880
- Heterochroma berylloides Hampson, 1908
- Lacinipolia parvula (Herrich-Schäffer, 1868)
- Leucania chejela (Schaus, 1921)
- Leucania hampsoni Schaus, 1940
- Leucania humidicola Guenée, 1852
- Leucania inconspicua Herrich-Schäffer, 1868
- Leucania latiuscula (Herrich-Schäffer, 1868)
- Leucania microsticha (Hampson, 1905)
- Leucania phragmitidicola Guenée, 1852
- Magusa orbifera (Walker, 1857)
- Meliana rosea (Möschler)
- Mythimna unipuncta (Haworth, 1809)
- Sesamia calamistis (Hampson, 1910)
- Speocropia scriptura (Walker, 1858)
- Spodoptera albula (Walker, 1857)
- Spodoptera androgea (Stoll, [1781])
- Spodoptera dolichos (Fabricius, 1794)
- Spodoptera eridania (Stoll, [1781])
- Spodoptera frugiperda (J.E. Smith, 1797)
- Spodoptera latifascia (Walker, 1856)
- Spodoptera ornithogalli (Guenée, 1852)
- Spodoptera pulchella (Herrich-Schäffer, 1868)
- Tandilia rodea (Schaus, 1894)
- Xanthopastis timais (Cramer, [1780])
