= N. portoricensis =

N. portoricensis may refer to:

- Nerax portoricensis, a robber fly
- Niso portoricensis, a sea snail
- Nola portoricensis, a tuft moth
