= Dichomeris elliptica =

Scientific classification
- Kingdom: Animalia
- Phylum: Arthropoda
- Clade: Pancrustacea
- Class: Insecta
- Order: Lepidoptera
- Family: Gelechiidae
- Genus: Dichomeris
- Species: D. elliptica

Binomial name
- Dichomeris elliptica (Forbes, 1931)

Synonyms
- Trichotaphe elliptica Forbes, 1931

Species of moth

Dichomeris elliptica is a moth in the family Gelechiidae. It was described by William Trowbridge Merrifield Forbes in 1931. It is found in Puerto Rico.
