= Compsolechia melanophaea =

Scientific classification
- Kingdom: Animalia
- Phylum: Arthropoda
- Clade: Pancrustacea
- Class: Insecta
- Order: Lepidoptera
- Family: Gelechiidae
- Genus: Compsolechia
- Species: C. melanophaea

Binomial name
- Compsolechia melanophaea (Forbes, 1931)

Synonyms
- Anacampsis melanophaea Forbes, 1931

Species of moth

Compsolechia melanophaea is a moth of the family Gelechiidae. It was described by William Trowbridge Merrifield Forbes in 1931. It is found in Puerto Rico.
