= Acrocercops pontifica =

Scientific classification
- Kingdom: Animalia
- Phylum: Arthropoda
- Clade: Pancrustacea
- Class: Insecta
- Order: Lepidoptera
- Family: Gracillariidae
- Genus: Acrocercops
- Species: A. pontifica

Binomial name
- Acrocercops pontifica Forbes, 1931

Species of moth

Acrocercops pontifica is a moth of the family Gracillariidae known from Puerto Rico. It was described by William Trowbridge Merrifield Forbes in 1931.
