= Stilbosis phaeoptera =

Scientific classification
- Kingdom: Animalia
- Phylum: Arthropoda
- Clade: Pancrustacea
- Class: Insecta
- Order: Lepidoptera
- Family: Cosmopterigidae
- Genus: Stilbosis
- Species: S. phaeoptera

Binomial name
- Stilbosis phaeoptera Forbes, 1931

Species of moth

Stilbosis phaeoptera is a moth in the family Cosmopterigidae. It was described by William Trowbridge Merrifield Forbes in 1931. It is found in Puerto Rico.
