= Acrocercops zebrulella =

Scientific classification
- Kingdom: Animalia
- Phylum: Arthropoda
- Clade: Pancrustacea
- Class: Insecta
- Order: Lepidoptera
- Family: Gracillariidae
- Genus: Acrocercops
- Species: A. zebrulella

Binomial name
- Acrocercops zebrulella Forbes, 1931

Species of moth

Acrocercops zebrulella is a moth of the family Gracillariidae. It is known from Puerto Rico.
