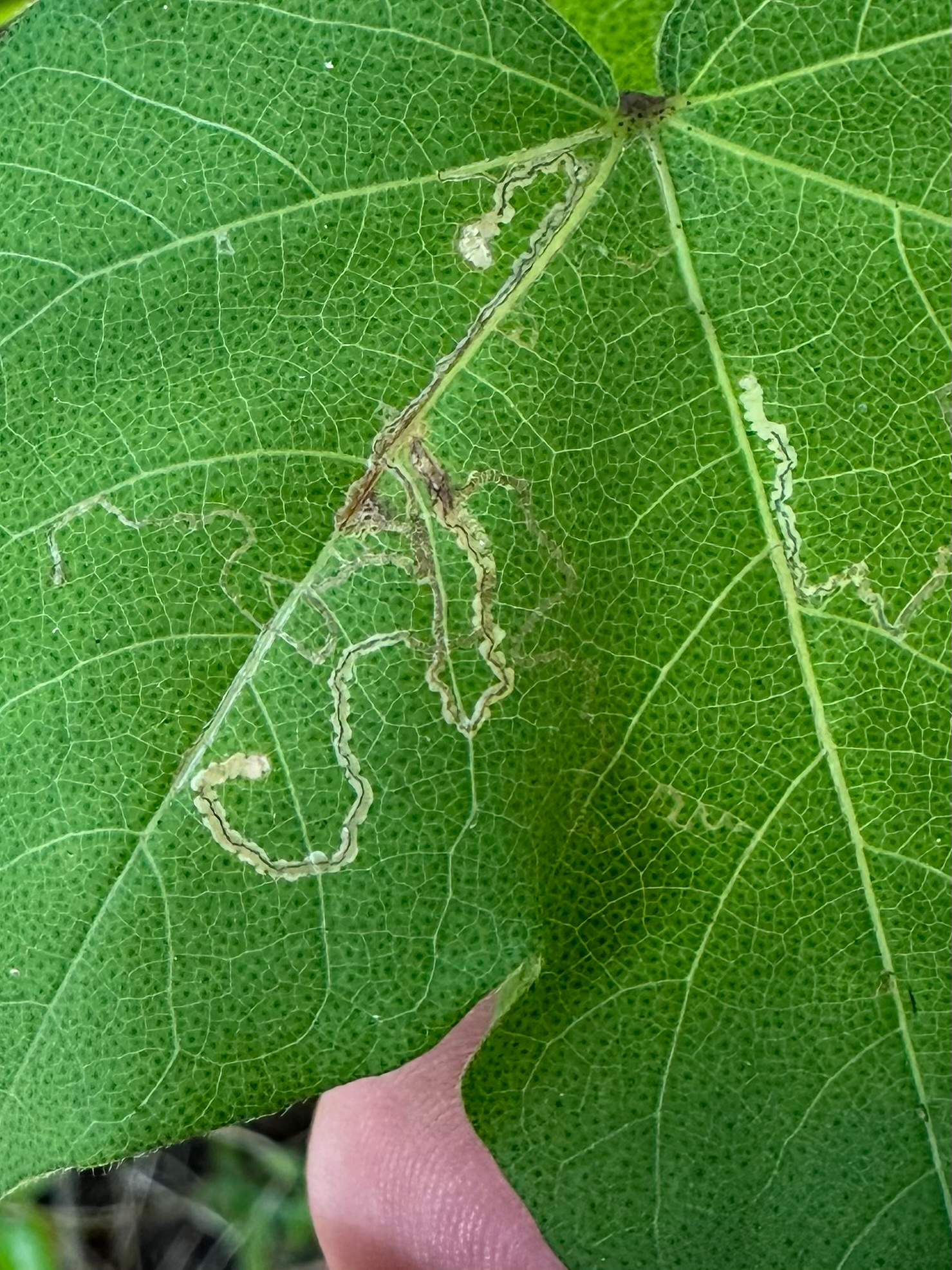
- Leaf mines caused by Stigmella gossypii

Scientific classification
- Kingdom: Animalia
- Phylum: Arthropoda
- Clade: Pancrustacea
- Class: Insecta
- Order: Lepidoptera
- Family: Nepticulidae
- Genus: Stigmella
- Species: S. gossypii

Binomial name
- Stigmella gossypii (Forbes & Leonard, 1930)

Synonyms
- Nepticula gossypii Forbes & Leonard, 1930

= Stigmella gossypii =

Species of moth

Stigmella gossypii is a species of moth in the family Nepticulidae. It is found in the US (Puerto Rico and Florida).

The wingspan is 3–3.2 millimetres (0.12–0.13 in). Mines can be found in March and early April, with adults on wings 10 days later. There is probably one generation per year.

The larvae feed on Gossypium barbadense. They mine the leaves of their host plant.
