= Acrocercops cymella =

Scientific classification
- Kingdom: Animalia
- Phylum: Arthropoda
- Clade: Pancrustacea
- Class: Insecta
- Order: Lepidoptera
- Family: Gracillariidae
- Genus: Acrocercops
- Species: A. cymella

Binomial name
- Acrocercops cymella Forbes, 1931

Species of moth

Acrocercops cymella is a moth of the family Gracillariidae known from Puerto Rico. It was described by William Trowbridge Merrifield Forbes in 1931.
