= Aristotelia vagabundella =

Scientific classification
- Kingdom: Animalia
- Phylum: Arthropoda
- Clade: Pancrustacea
- Class: Insecta
- Order: Lepidoptera
- Family: Gelechiidae
- Genus: Aristotelia
- Species: A. vagabundella

Binomial name
- Aristotelia vagabundella Forbes, 1931

Species of moth

Aristotelia vagabundella is a moth of the family Gelechiidae. It was described by William Trowbridge Merrifield Forbes in 1931. It is found in Puerto Rico.
