= Acrocercops inconspicua =

Scientific classification
- Kingdom: Animalia
- Phylum: Arthropoda
- Clade: Pancrustacea
- Class: Insecta
- Order: Lepidoptera
- Family: Gracillariidae
- Genus: Acrocercops
- Species: A. inconspicua

Binomial name
- Acrocercops inconspicua Forbes, 1930

Species of moth

Acrocercops inconspicua is a moth of the family Gracillariidae known from Puerto Rico. It was described by William Trowbridge Merrifield Forbes in 1930. The host plant for the species is Citharaexylon fruticosum.
