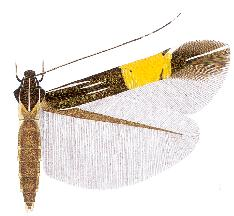

Scientific classification
- Kingdom: Animalia
- Phylum: Arthropoda
- Clade: Pancrustacea
- Class: Insecta
- Order: Lepidoptera
- Family: Cosmopterigidae
- Genus: Cosmopterix
- Species: C. vanderwolfi

Binomial name
- Cosmopterix vanderwolfi Koster, 2010

= Cosmopterix vanderwolfi =

Species of moth

Cosmopterix vanderwolfi is a moth of the family Cosmopterigidae. It is known from Puerto Rico.

Adults have been recorded in August.

== Description ==
Male, female. Forewing length 3.7 mm. Head: frons ochreous-white, vertex, neck tufts and collar dark brown with reddish gloss, laterally and medially lined white; labial palpus first segment very short, white, second segment three-quarters of the length of third, dark brown with white longitudinal lines laterally and ventrally, third segment white, lined dark brown laterally; scape dorsally shining dark brown with white anterior line, ventrally shining white, antenna dark brown with a white line from base to three-fifths, often partly interrupted, followed towards apex by eight dark brown segments, two white, two dark brown, two white, ten dark brown, four to five white and two or three dark brown segments at the apex. Thorax and tegulae dark brown with reddish gloss, thorax with a white median line, tegulae lined white inwardly. Legs: dark greyish brown, femora of midleg and hindleg shining ochreous grey, foreleg with a white line on tibia and tarsal segments one and two, segment three white in basal half, segment five entirely white, tibia of midleg with white oblique basal and medial lines and a white apical ring, tarsal segment one lined white on the outside and with a white apical ring, segments two and four with white apical spots and segment five entirely white, tibia of hindleg as midleg, tarsal segments one to four with white apical rings, segment five dorsally white, spurs white dorsally, greyish brown ventrally. Forewing shining dark brown with reddish gloss, four white lines in the basal area, a subcostal from base to one-quarter, slightly bending from costa, a short medial in the centre underneath the end of the subcostal, a subdorsal about as long as the medial, but slightly further from base, a yellow-orange transverse fascia beyond the middle, narrowed towards dorsum, bordered on the inner and outer edge by broad tubercular golden metallic fasciae, the inner fascia almost perpendicular on dorsum, not reaching costa and with a blackish spot subcostally on the outside, the outer fascia inwardly oblique and strongly narrowed at one-third from the costa, lined dark brown on the inside at costa and dorsum, a white costal streak beyond the outer fascia, a white apical line from the distal half of apical area to apex, cilia dark brown around apex, paler towards dorsum. Hindwing dark greyish brown, cilia dark brown. Underside: forewing shining greyish brown, the white costal streak indistinctly and the white apical line distinctly visible in the apical cilia. Abdomen dorsally dark greyish brown with reddish gloss, ventrally dark grey, in the middle shining ochreous-white, segments banded shining white posteriorly, anal tuft dorsally dark grey, ventrally ochreous-white.

== Etymology ==
The species is dedicated to Mr. Hugo van der Wolf, Nuenen, the Netherlands, as one of the participants of the Netherlands Entomological Expedition to the north of Argentina in 1995-1996.
