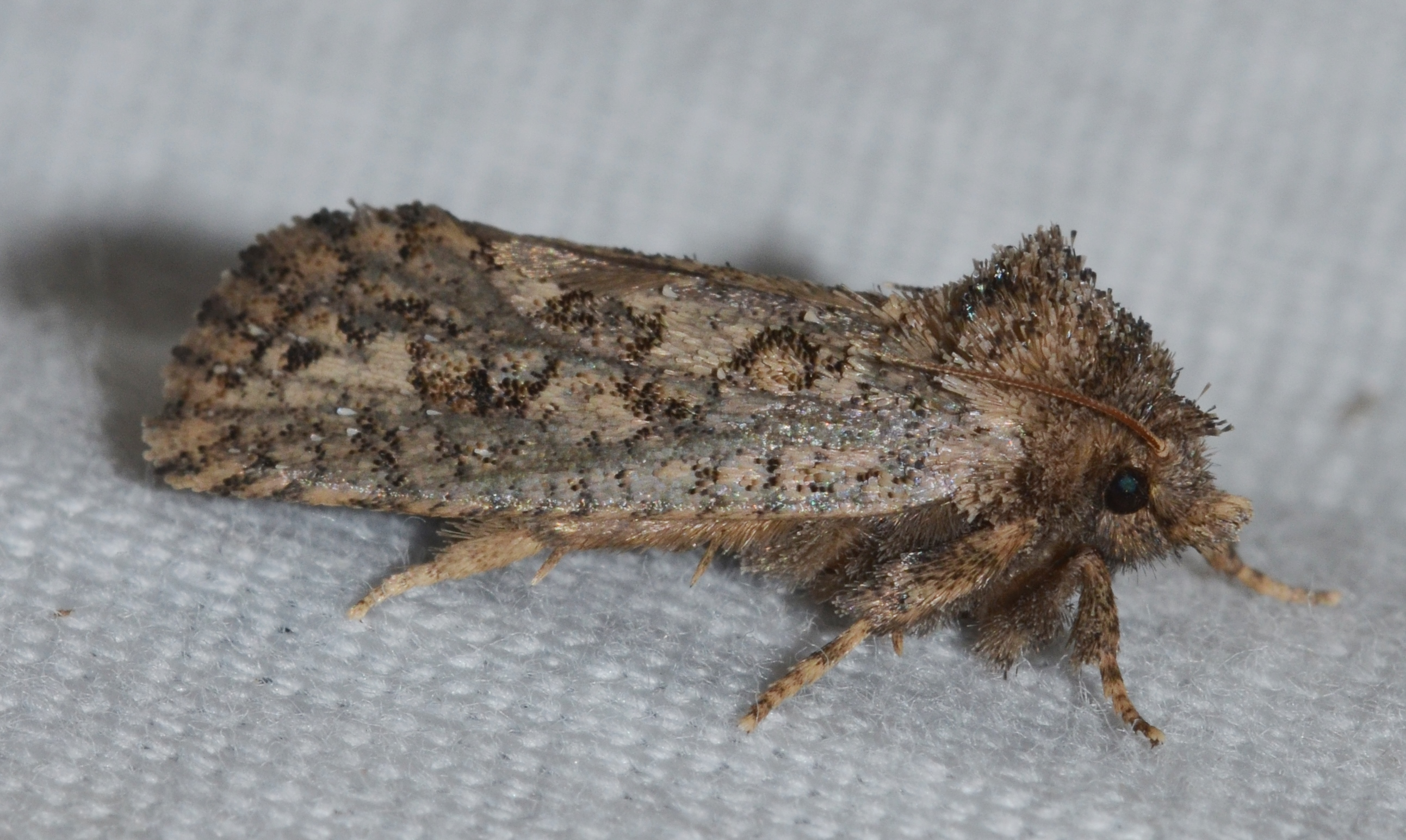

Scientific classification
- Kingdom: Animalia
- Phylum: Arthropoda
- Clade: Pancrustacea
- Class: Insecta
- Order: Lepidoptera
- Family: Tineidae
- Genus: Acrolophus
- Species: A. arcanella

Binomial name
- Acrolophus arcanella (Clemens, 1859)

Synonyms
- Anaphora arcanella Clemens, 1859

= Acrolophus arcanella =

Species of moth

Acrolophus arcanella (grass tubeworm moth) is a moth of the family Acrolophidae. It is found in eastern North America.

The wingspan is about 25 mm.
