= Haplostola =

Scientific classification
- Domain: Eukaryota
- Kingdom: Animalia
- Phylum: Arthropoda
- Class: Insecta
- Order: Lepidoptera
- Superfamily: Noctuoidea
- Family: Noctuidae
- Subfamily: Acontiinae
- Genus: Haplostola; Möschler, 1890
- Species: H. aphelioides

Binomial name
- Haplostola aphelioides Möschler, 1890

Genus and species of moth

Haplostola is a monotypic moth genus of the family Noctuidae. Its only species, Haplostola aphelioides, is found in Puerto Rico. Both the genus and species were first described by Heinrich Benno Möschler in 1890.
