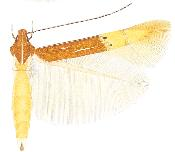

Scientific classification
- Kingdom: Animalia
- Phylum: Arthropoda
- Clade: Pancrustacea
- Class: Insecta
- Order: Lepidoptera
- Family: Cosmopterigidae
- Genus: Cosmopterix
- Species: C. carpo

Binomial name
- Cosmopterix carpo Koster, 2010

= Cosmopterix carpo =

Species of moth

Cosmopterix carpo is a moth of the family Cosmopterigidae. It is known from Puerto Rico and the British Virgin Islands (Tortola).

Adults were collected in July and August.

== Description ==
Male, female. Forewing length 2.4 mm. Head: frons shining white with greenish and reddish reflections, vertex and neck tufts shining olive brown with reddish gloss, medially and lined white laterally, collar shining olive brown; labial palpus first segment very short, white, second segment three-quarters of the length of third, dark brown with white longitudinal lines laterally and ventrally, third segment white, lined brown laterally; scape dorsally shining dark brown with a white anterior line, ventrally shining white, antenna shining dark brown, a white line from base to three-fifths, followed by two white rings on two segments separated by two dark brown segments, followed towards apex by six dark brown segments, two white and five dark brown segments at apex. Thorax and tegulae shining olive brown with reddish gloss, thorax with a white median line. Legs: shining ochreous-grey, foreleg with a white line on tibia and tarsal segments one to three and five, segment four with a white apical ring, tibia of midleg with white oblique basal and medial lines and a white apical ring, tarsal segments one and two with white apical spots, segment five entirely white, tibia of hindleg with a very oblique white line from base to two-thirds and a white apical ring, tarsal segments with indistinct whitish apical rings, spurs white dorsally, ochreous ventrally. Forewing shining olive brown with reddish gloss, four narrow white lines in the basal area, a costal from base to the transverse fascia, a short medial above fold, from one-quarter to one third, a subdorsal from one-third to one-half, a dorsal from base to one-third, the costal edged brown, other lines sometimes edged by a few brown scales, a pale yellow transverse fascia beyond the middle, prolonged towards apex, dividing the forewing in an olive brown basal area and a pale yellow apical area, bordered at inner edge by two tubercular pale golden metallic subcostal and subdorsal spots, both spots of similar size and with an outward patch of blackish scales, the subdorsal slightly further from base than the subcostal, in the middle of the pale yellow section a small tubercular pale golden costal and dorsal spot of similar size opposite, apical line absent, cilia ochreous around apex, yellowish white towards dorsum. Hindwing shining very pale grey, cilia yellowish white. Underside: forewing shining pale greyish brown in the basal half, pale yellow in the apical half, hindwing shining very pale grey. Abdomen dorsally shining pale yellow, ventrally shining ochreous, anal tuft shining white.

== Etymology ==
The species is named after Carpo, a moon of Jupiter. To be treated as a noun in apposition.
