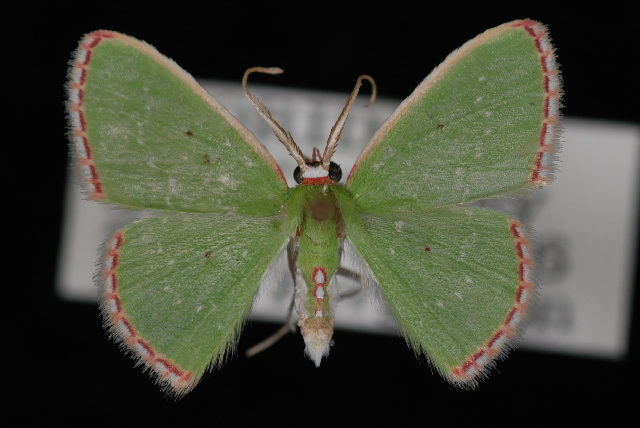

Scientific classification
- Kingdom: Animalia
- Phylum: Arthropoda
- Class: Insecta
- Order: Lepidoptera
- Family: Geometridae
- Genus: Synchlora
- Species: S. herbaria

Binomial name
- Synchlora herbaria (Fabricius, 1794)

Synonyms
- Phalaena herbaria Fabricius, 1794; Racheospila bonhotei Prout, 1912; Lissochlora intacta Warren, 1905; Racheospila sanctaecrucis Prout, 1932; Synchlora hulstiana Dyar, 1901; Geometra attendaria Moschler, 1890; Geometra congruata Walker, 1861; Geometra croceofimbriata Herrich-Schäffer, 1870; Jodis indeclararia Walker, 1861; Racheospila sitellaria Guenée, 1858

= Synchlora herbaria =

Species of moth

Synchlora herbaria is a moth in the family Geometridae first described by Johan Christian Fabricius in 1794. It is found in Florida, Cuba, Hispaniola, Puerto Rico, the Bahamas, Antigua, Dominica and the Virgin Islands.

The wingspan is about 13 mm.

The larvae have been recorded feeding on Lantana camara.

== Subspecies ==
- Synchlora herbaria herbaria (Florida, Cuba, Hispaniola, Puerto-Rico)
- Synchlora herbaria bonhotei (Prout, 1912) (Bahamas)
- Synchlora herbaria dorsuaria Prout, 1912 (Antigua)
- Synchlora herbaria intacta (Warren, 1905) (Dominica)
- Synchlora herbaria sanctaecrucis (Prout, 1932) (Virgin Islands)
