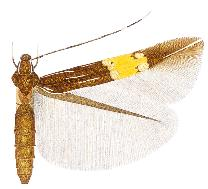

Scientific classification
- Kingdom: Animalia
- Phylum: Arthropoda
- Class: Insecta
- Order: Lepidoptera
- Family: Cosmopterigidae
- Genus: Cosmopterix
- Species: C. astrapias

Binomial name
- Cosmopterix astrapias Walsingham, 1909

Synonyms
- Cosmopterix bendidia Hodges, 1962

= Cosmopterix astrapias =

Species of moth from the Americas

Cosmopterix astrapias is a moth of the family Cosmopterigidae. It is known from the United States (from Massachusetts and northwest Arkansas south to southern Florida, southern Texas and southern Arizona), Argentina (Salta and Tucumán), Costa Rica, Jamaica, Mexico (Tabasco) and Puerto Rico.

== Description ==
Male, female. Forewing length 3.5-3.8 mm. Head: frons shining greyish white with greenish reflection, vertex and neck tufts shining bronze brown, laterally lined white, collar shining bronze brown; labial palpus first segment very short, white, second segment four-fifths of the length of third, dark brown with white longitudinal lines laterally and ventrally in apical part, third segment white, lined brown laterally, extreme apex white; scape dorsally shining dark brown with a white anterior line, ventrally shining white, antenna shining dark brown with a white line from base to one-third, changing into an interrupted line to two-thirds, followed towards apex by six dark brown, one white, one blackish white, four white, ten dark brown and seven white segments at apex, the white subapical ring of four segments can be narrowed by a few (partly) brown scales (or widened to six segments and sometimes even followed by a narrow white ring of two segments), the white apex can be reduced by up to three white segments. Thorax and tegulae shining bronze brown, thorax often with a posterior white spot. Legs: shining dark greyish brown, foreleg with a white line on tibia and first three tarsal segments, fifth segment white, femora of midleg and hindleg shining pale ochreous-grey, tibia of midleg with white oblique basal and medial lines and a white apical ring, tarsal segments one and two with white longitudinal lines, segment five white, tibia of hindleg as midleg, tarsal segment three with a white longitudinal line, segments four and five white, spurs white dorsally, brown ventrally. Forewing shining dark brown with reddish gloss, six narrow white lines in the basal area, a first subcostal, from base to one-quarter and bending from costa in distal half, an indistinct short second subcostal between the first subcostal and the transverse fascia, a medial just above fold, from beyond base to one-third, a subdorsal from one-sixth to end of the medial, a short rather thick, oblique line above dorsum near base and a very short dorsal from one-seventh to one-fifth, there is variation in the length and thickness of the white lines in the basal area of the forewing, the length of the first subcostal line varies from one-quarter to one-third of wing length, the medial varies from short in the middle of the area to starting just beyond base almost to the transverse fascia, this line is sometimes interrupted in the middle, the dorsal line varies from a complete line to just a few white scales, a bright orange-yellow transverse fascia beyond the middle with a short apical protrusion, bordered at the inner edge by a tubercular pale golden metallic fascia with reddish gloss, not reaching costa, bordered at the outer edge by two tubercular pale golden metallic costal and dorsal spots, the dorsal spot about three times as large as the costal, a small subcostal patch of blackish scales on outside of the pale golden metallic fascia, both pale golden metallic spots lined dark brown on the inside, the width of the transverse fascia and the shape of the bordering tubercular fascia and spots are variable, a shining white apical line, starting well beyond the apical protrusion, cilia dark brown. Hindwing shining dark greyish brown, cilia dark brown. Underside: forewing shining dark greyish brown, hindwing dark greyish brown, a broad greyish-white streak on dorsum from base to one-half. Abdomen dorsally shining dark bronze brown with some greenish and reddish reflections, segments four to seven banded greyish white posteriorly, ventrally shining white or shining dark greyish brown, segments banded shining greyish white posteriorly and with a broad shining yellowish white longitudinal streak, anal tuft brownish grey, mixed whitish to dark brown.

== Biology ==
The larvae feed on Ipomoea species, including Ipomoea neei in Costa Rica. They mine the leaves of their host plant. Adults have been collected throughout the year. Probably the species has several overlapping generations in tropical areas and is double brooded in the northern part of its range.
