= Eois snellenaria =

Scientific classification
- Kingdom: Animalia
- Phylum: Arthropoda
- Clade: Pancrustacea
- Class: Insecta
- Order: Lepidoptera
- Family: Geometridae
- Genus: Eois
- Species: E. snellenaria

Binomial name
- Eois snellenaria (Moschler, 1882)

Synonyms
- Asthena snellenaria Moschler, 1882; Amphibatodes unilineata Warren, 1895

Species of moth

Eois snellenaria is a moth in the family Geometridae. It is found in Suriname, Puerto Rico and Jamaica.
