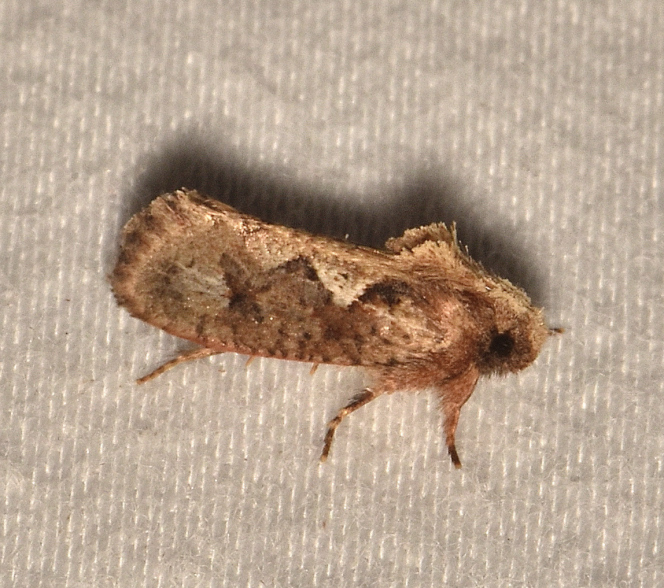
- Acrolophus walsinghami, Florida

Scientific classification
- Kingdom: Animalia
- Phylum: Arthropoda
- Class: Insecta
- Order: Lepidoptera
- Family: Tineidae
- Genus: Acrolophus
- Species: A. walsinghami

Binomial name
- Acrolophus walsinghami Möschler, 1890

Synonyms
- Acrolophus triformellus Forbes, 1930; Anaphora triatomella Walsingham, 1897

= Acrolophus walsinghami =

Species of moth

Acrolophus walsinghami is a moth of the family Acrolophidae. It is found in Florida, Virgin Islands and Puerto Rico.
