= Syllepte belialis =

Scientific classification
- Domain: Eukaryota
- Kingdom: Animalia
- Phylum: Arthropoda
- Class: Insecta
- Order: Lepidoptera
- Family: Crambidae
- Genus: Syllepte
- Species: S. belialis

Binomial name
- Syllepte belialis (Walker, 1859)

Synonyms
- Botys belialis Walker, 1859; Botys albifrontalis Möschler, 1890; Botys molliculalis Walker, 1866; Pilocrosis holoxantha Hampson, 1912

Species of moth

Syllepte belialis is a moth in the family Crambidae. It was described by Francis Walker in 1859. It is found in Brazil, Honduras, Costa Rica, Jamaica, Puerto Rico and Cuba.
