= Scopula canularia =

Scientific classification
- Domain: Eukaryota
- Kingdom: Animalia
- Phylum: Arthropoda
- Class: Insecta
- Order: Lepidoptera
- Family: Geometridae
- Genus: Scopula
- Species: S. canularia

Binomial name
- Scopula canularia (Herrich-Schäffer, 1870)

Synonyms
- Acidalia canularia Herrich-Schaffer, 1870

Species of geometer moth in subfamily Sterrhinae

Scopula canularia is a moth of the family Geometridae. It is found on Cuba and Puerto Rico.
