= Syllepte brunnescens =

Scientific classification
- Kingdom: Animalia
- Phylum: Arthropoda
- Clade: Pancrustacea
- Class: Insecta
- Order: Lepidoptera
- Family: Crambidae
- Genus: Syllepte
- Species: S. brunnescens

Binomial name
- Syllepte brunnescens (Hampson, 1912)

Synonyms
- Sylepta brunnescens Hampson, 1912; Sylepta imbroglialis Dyar, 1914

Species of moth

Syllepte brunnescens is a moth in the family Crambidae. It was described by George Hampson in 1912. It is found in Brazil (Rio de Janeiro), Panama and Mexico.

The wingspan is about 30 millimetres (1.2 in). The forewings are pale reddish brown, with a paler inner half. There are traces of a sinuous antemedial line and there is a faint dark spot in the middle of the cell, as well as a discoidal lunule. The postmedial line is indistinct. The hindwings are pale reddish brown with whitish basal and inner areas. There is a slight dark discoidal bar and an indistinct dark medial line.
