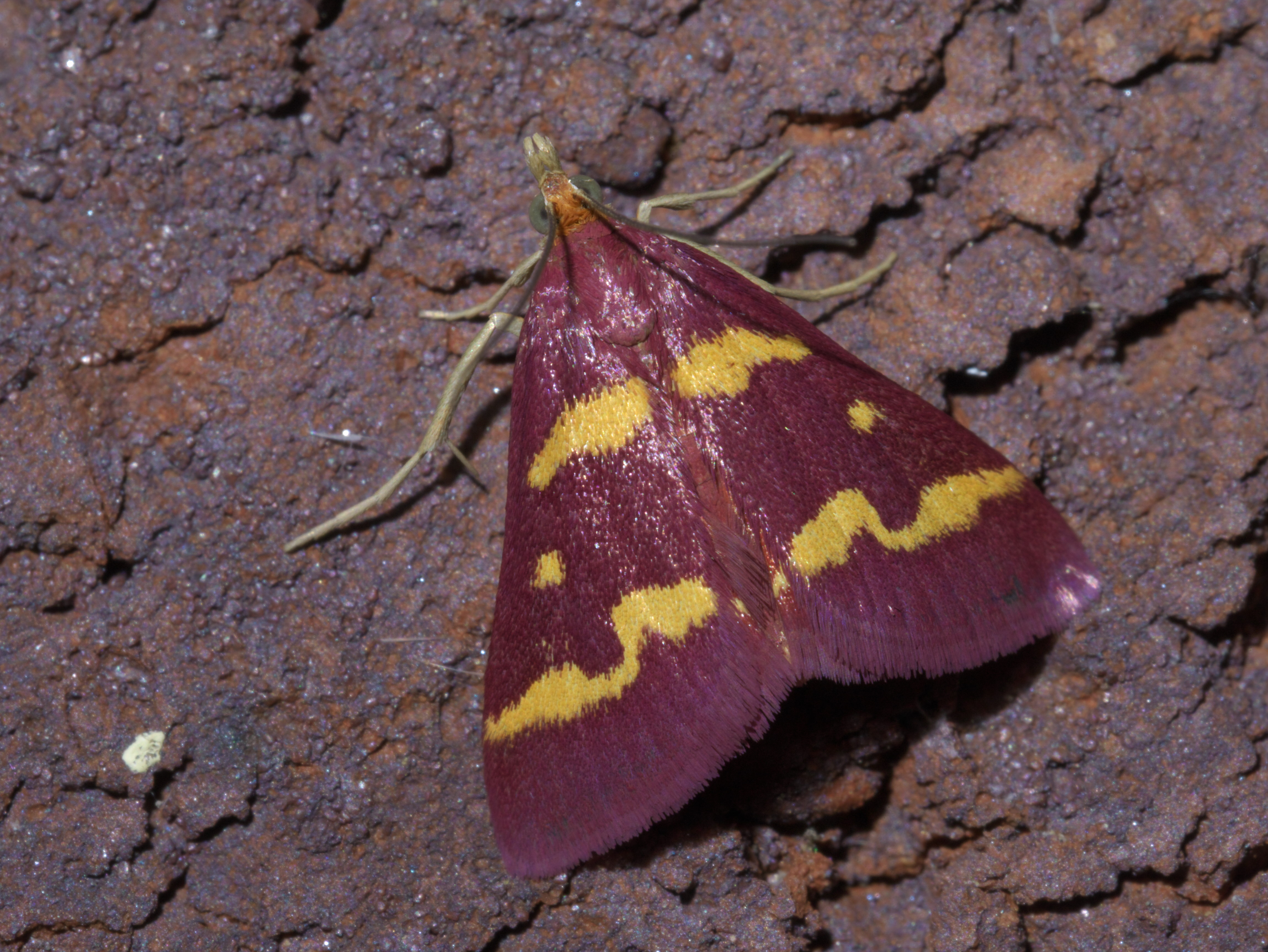
- Pyrausta tyralis, coffee-loving pyrausta moth, Size: 8.9 mm

Scientific classification
- Kingdom: Animalia
- Phylum: Arthropoda
- Class: Insecta
- Order: Lepidoptera
- Family: Crambidae
- Genus: Pyrausta
- Species: P. tyralis

Binomial name
- Pyrausta tyralis (Guenée, 1854)

Synonyms
- Rhodaria tyralis Guenée, 1854; Botis bellulalis Hulst, 1886; Botys diffissa Grote & Robinson, 1867; Pyrausta erosnealis Walker, 1859; Rhodaria agathalis Walker, 1859; Syllythria idessa Druce, 1895

= Pyrausta tyralis =

Species of moth

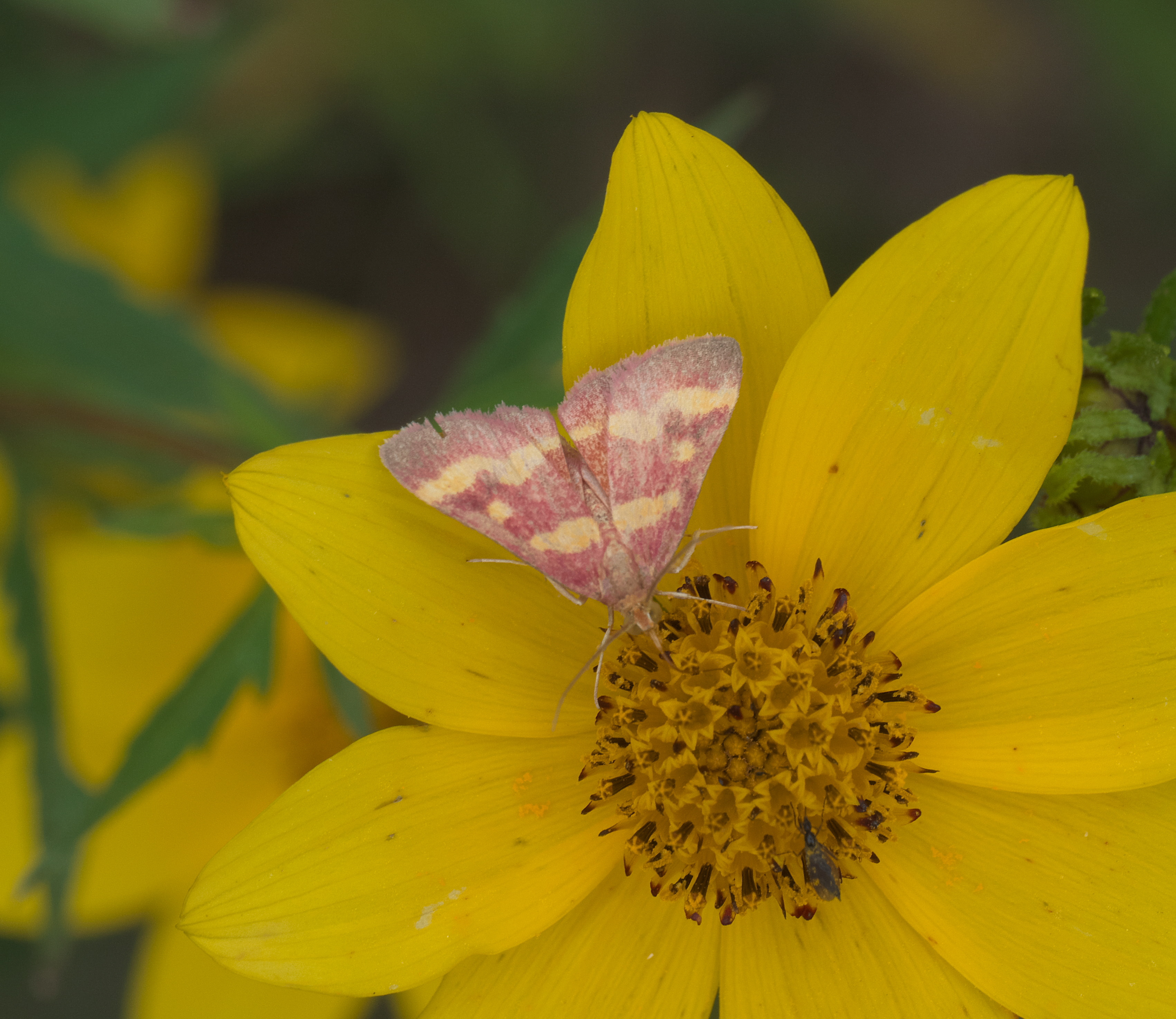
Pyrausta tyralis, coffee-loving pyrausta moth

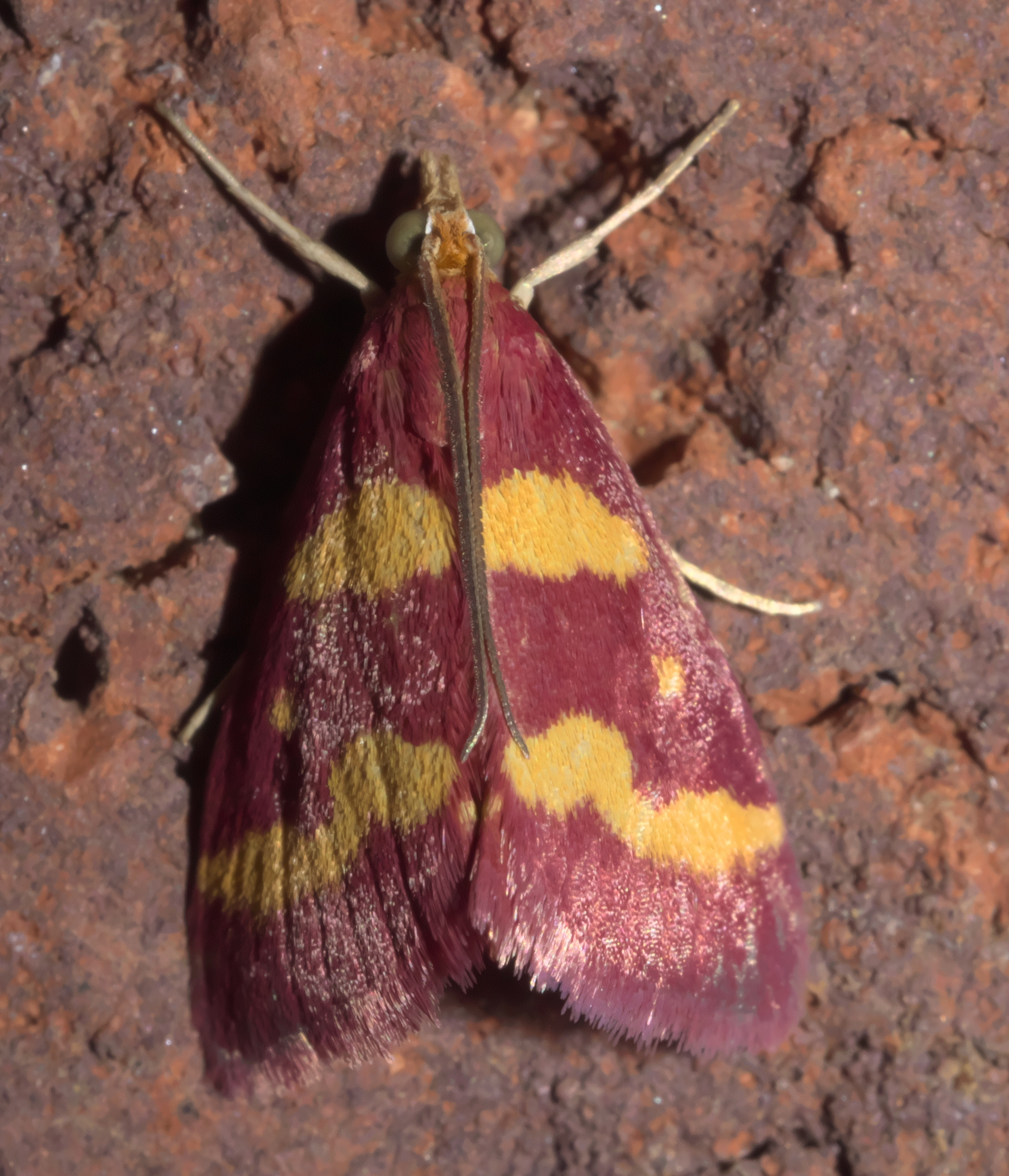
Pyrausta tyralis, coffee-loving pyrausta moth

Pyrausta tyralis, the coffee-loving pyrausta moth, is a species of moth in the family Crambidae. It was described by Achille Guenée in 1854. It is found in the United States, where it has been recorded from New York to Illinois and from Florida to Arizona. It is also found from Mexico to Venezuela, as well as on the West Indies.

The wingspan is about 17 mm (0.67 in). Adults have been recorded on wing year round.

The larvae feed on Psychotria nervosa, Psychotria undata, Bidens connata and Dahlia species.
