= Lophoditta =

Scientific classification
- Domain: Eukaryota
- Kingdom: Animalia
- Phylum: Arthropoda
- Class: Insecta
- Order: Lepidoptera
- Superfamily: Noctuoidea
- Family: Erebidae
- Subfamily: Herminiinae
- Genus: Lophoditta; Möschler, 1890
- Species: L. tuberculata

Binomial name
- Lophoditta tuberculata (Herrich-Schäffer, 1870)

Synonyms
- Physula tuberculata Herrich-Schäffer, 1870; Lophoditta perspicillaris Möschler, 1890

Genus and species of moth

Lophoditta is a monotypic moth genus of the family Erebidae described by Heinrich Benno Möschler in 1890. Its only species, Lophoditta tuberculata, was first described by Gottlieb August Wilhelm Herrich-Schäffer in 1870. It is found in Puerto Rico.
