= Acrocercops albomarginatum =

Scientific classification
- Domain: Eukaryota
- Kingdom: Animalia
- Phylum: Arthropoda
- Class: Insecta
- Order: Lepidoptera
- Family: Gracillariidae
- Genus: Acrocercops
- Species: A. albomarginatum

Binomial name
- Acrocercops albomarginatum (Walsingham, 1897)

Species of moth

Acrocercops albomarginatum is a moth of the family Gracillariidae, known from Cuba, Puerto Rico, and the Virgin Islands. The hostplants for the species include Centrosema plumieri and Sida rhombifolia. They mine the leaves of their host plant.
