= Dichomeris piperatus =

Scientific classification
- Kingdom: Animalia
- Phylum: Arthropoda
- Class: Insecta
- Order: Lepidoptera
- Family: Gelechiidae
- Genus: Dichomeris
- Species: D. piperatus

Binomial name
- Dichomeris piperatus (Walsingham, [1892])

Synonyms
- Ypsolophus piperatus Walsingham, [1892]; Dichomeris piperata Walsingham, 1891

Species of moth

Dichomeris piperatus is a moth in the family Gelechiidae. It was described by Thomas de Grey, 6th Baron Walsingham, in 1892. It is found in the West Indies, where it has been recorded from St. Vincent, Puerto Rico and Cuba.

The wingspan is about 9 mm (0.35 in). The forewings are pale ochreous, dusted with black scales, especially on the outer half. The costa is black at the base, dotted unequally with black throughout. The apical margin is dusted with black and there is a black discal spot at one fourth from the base above the fold. A second smaller one below it and two black dots towards the end of the cell, the first of which is at about the middle of the wing, the second beyond the middle, below the first of these spots is a small black dot. The hindwings are grey with a faint iridescence.
