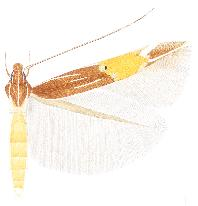

Scientific classification
- Kingdom: Animalia
- Phylum: Arthropoda
- Class: Insecta
- Order: Lepidoptera
- Family: Cosmopterigidae
- Genus: Cosmopterix
- Species: C. similis

Binomial name
- Cosmopterix similis Walsingham, 1897

= Cosmopterix similis =

Species of moth

Cosmopterix similis is a moth of the family Cosmopterigidae. It is known from the US Virgin Islands (St. Thomas, St. Croix) and the British Virgin Islands (Guana).

Adults have been recorded in March, April, June and July.

== Description ==
Male, female. Forewing length 3.6-3.7 mm. Head: frons shining pale ochreous, vertex and neck tufts shining greyish brown, laterally and medially lined white, collar greyish brown; labial palpus first segment very short, white, second segment three-quarters of the length of third, greyish brown with white longitudinal lines laterally and ventrally, third segment white, lined dark brown laterally, lines join dorsally just before apex; scape brown with a white anterior line, white ventrally, antenna shining dark brown, a white line from base to two-thirds, followed towards apex by white segments, two dark brown, two white, six dark brown, three white and two dark brown segments at apex. Thorax greyish brown with white median line, tegulae greyish brown, lined white inwardly. Legs: brownish grey, foreleg with a white line on tibia and tarsal segments, except segment three which has the apical half dark brown, tibia of midleg with oblique basal and medial white lines and a white apical ring, tarsal segments as foreleg, tibia of hindleg as midleg, tarsal segment one with white basal and apical dorsal streaks, segments two and three with a white apical dorsal streak, segments four and five dorsally white, spurs brownish grey on outside, white on inside. Forewing greyish brown, five white lines in the basal area, a costal from one-third to the transverse fascia, a subcostal from base to one-third, bending gradually from costa in distal half, an almost straight medial above fold, from one-quarter to beyond the subcostal, a subdorsal from one-quarter to just before the transverse fascia, a dorsal from beyond base to one-third, a broad yellow transverse fascia beyond the middle, narrowing towards dorsum with a small apical protrusion, bordered on the inner edge by two pale golden metallic, tubercular subcostal and dorsal spots, both of the same size, the subcostal spot edged by a patch of blackish brown scales on the outside, the dorsal spot further from base than the subcostal, bordered on the outer edge by two similarly coloured costal and dorsal spots, the costal spot very small, the dorsal spot about three times as large as the costal and more towards base, a broad white costal streak beyond the outer costal spot and a shining white apical line from the apical protrusion to apex, cilia ochreous-brown, ochreous-grey towards dorsum. Hindwing shining grey, cilia ochreous-grey. Underside: forewing shining pale greyish brown, the white costal streak and the white apical line in the cilia at apex distinctly visible, hindwing shining greyish brown. Abdomen dorsally shining golden yellow, laterally and ventrally shining yellowish white, anal tuft yellowish white.
