= Microcrambus discludellus =

Scientific classification
- Kingdom: Animalia
- Phylum: Arthropoda
- Clade: Pancrustacea
- Class: Insecta
- Order: Lepidoptera
- Family: Crambidae
- Genus: Microcrambus
- Species: M. discludellus

Binomial name
- Microcrambus discludellus (Möschler, 1890)

Synonyms
- Crambus discludellus Möschler, 1890; Crambus domingellus Schaus, 1922; Crambus micralis Hampson, 1919; Microcrambus discobolus Błeszyński, 1963

Species of moth

Microcrambus discludellus is a moth in the family Crambidae. It was described by Heinrich Benno Möschler in 1890. It is found in the Dominican Republic, Puerto Rico and Colombia, as well as in North America, where it has been recorded from Florida and South Carolina.
