= Sisyracera contortilinealis =

Scientific classification
- Kingdom: Animalia
- Phylum: Arthropoda
- Class: Insecta
- Order: Lepidoptera
- Family: Crambidae
- Genus: Sisyracera
- Species: S. contortilinealis

Binomial name
- Sisyracera contortilinealis (Hampson, 1895)

Synonyms
- Samea contortilinealis Hampson, 1895; Bocchoris contortilinealis; Nacoleia veroniae Dyar, 1917; Nacoleia verroniae Dyar, 1918

Species of moth

Sisyracera contortilinealis is a moth in the family Crambidae. It is found on Puerto Rico, Dominica, Grenada, Jamaica, Cuba and in Guyana.
