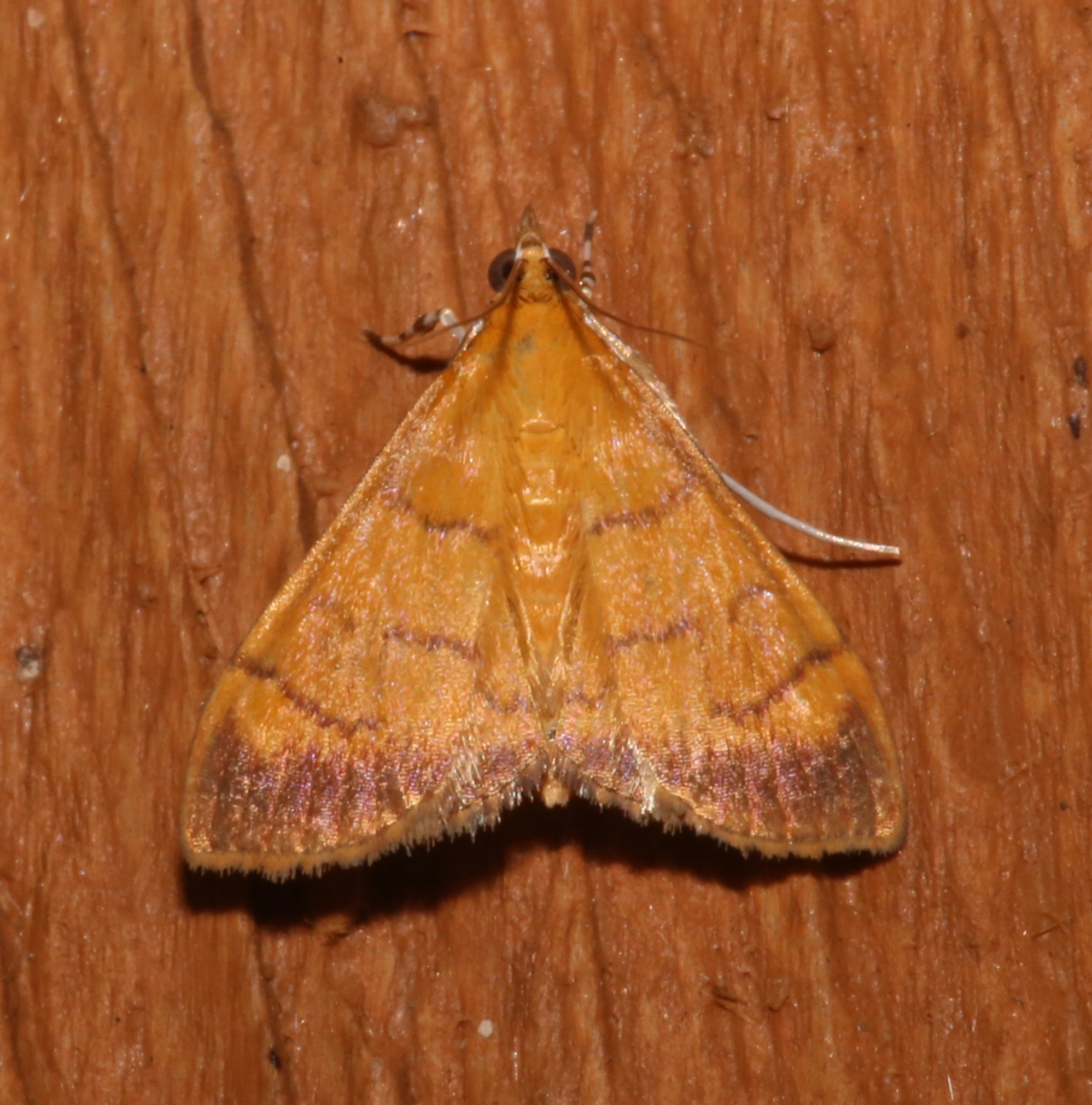

Scientific classification
- Kingdom: Animalia
- Phylum: Arthropoda
- Class: Insecta
- Order: Lepidoptera
- Family: Crambidae
- Genus: Pyrausta
- Species: P. insignitalis

Binomial name
- Pyrausta insignitalis (Guenée, 1854)

Synonyms
- Rhodaria insignitalis Guenée, 1854; Botys eratalis Walker, 1859; Asopia largalis Walker, 1859; Scopula ordinatalis Walker, 1865

= Pyrausta insignitalis =

Species of moth

Pyrausta insignitalis, the dark-banded pyrausta moth, is a moth in the family Crambidae. It was described by Achille Guenée in 1854. It is found in the United States, where it has been recorded from Florida and South Carolina. It is also found on the West Indies, as well as in Central and South America.

The wingspan is about 15–16 mm. Adults have been recorded on wing year round.
