= Coleophora pulchricornis =

Scientific classification
- Kingdom: Animalia
- Phylum: Arthropoda
- Class: Insecta
- Order: Lepidoptera
- Family: Coleophoridae
- Genus: Coleophora
- Species: C. pulchricornis

Binomial name
- Coleophora pulchricornis Walsingham, 1897

Species of moth

Coleophora pulchricornis is a moth of the family Coleophoridae. It is found in Florida, United States. It has also been recorded from the Antilles.

The larvae feed on Saccharum officinarum.
