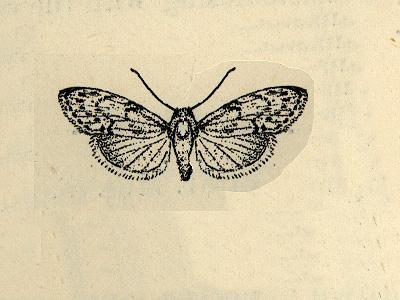

Scientific classification
- Domain: Eukaryota
- Kingdom: Animalia
- Phylum: Arthropoda
- Class: Insecta
- Order: Lepidoptera
- Superfamily: Noctuoidea
- Family: Nolidae
- Subfamily: Nolinae
- Genus: Cephalospargeta; Möschler, 1890
- Species: C. elongata

Binomial name
- Cephalospargeta elongata Möschler, 1890

= Cephalospargeta =

Genus of moths

Cephalospargeta is a genus of moths of the family Noctuidae. It contains only one species, Cephalospargeta elongata which is found in Texas and on Puerto Rico and Jamaica.
