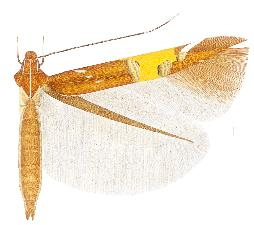

Scientific classification
- Kingdom: Animalia
- Phylum: Arthropoda
- Clade: Pancrustacea
- Class: Insecta
- Order: Lepidoptera
- Family: Cosmopterigidae
- Genus: Cosmopterix
- Species: C. gemmiferella

Binomial name
- Cosmopterix gemmiferella Clemens, 1860

= Cosmopterix gemmiferella =

Species of moth

Cosmopterix gemmiferella is a moth of the family Cosmopterigidae. It is known from the United States (from Maine, Illinois and northwest Arkansas south to central Florida and southern Louisiana) and Canada (Ontario).

== Description ==
Male, female. Forewing length 4.5-5.1 mm. Head: frons shining pale golden with greenish and purplish reflections, vertex, neck tufts and collar shining golden brown with greenish and reddish reflections; labial palpus first segment very short, white, second segment three-quarters of the length of third, dorsally golden brown ventrally ochreous-white, third segment white, laterally lined dark brown; scape dorsally brown, ventrally white, antenna shining dark brown with a white interrupted line from base to one-half, followed towards apex by approximately eleven dark brown segments, four white, two partly dark brown, two white, ten dark brown and eight white segments at apex. Thorax and tegulae shining golden brown, thorax with a greenish white median line, tegulae sometimes lined white inwardly. Legs: shining dark greyish brown with greenish and reddish reflections, femora shining ochreous, foreleg with a white line on tibia and tarsal segments one, two and five, tibia of midleg with shining white oblique basal and medial streaks and a shining white apical ring, tarsal segments one and two dorsal two-thirds white, segment five entirely white, tibia of hindleg as midleg, tarsal segments one, two and four with white apical rings, segment five entirely white, spurs shining dark greyish brown, outer spurs inwardly white. Forewing shining golden brown, more prominent in apical area, four short silvery lines in the basal area, a subcostal at one-sixth, bending from costa distally, a very short medial above fold just beyond the subcostal, a subdorsal below fold, similar in length to the medial, starting at the end of the medial, a dorsal from beyond base to one-sixth, a broad yellow transverse fascia beyond the middle, the costal half about twice as wide as the dorsal half, the dorsal half sometimes irrorated by dark brown scales, bordered at the inner edge by a pale golden metallic tubercular fascia, not reaching costa, bordered at the outer edge by two pale golden metallic tubercular costal and dorsal spots, the dorsal spot about twice the size of the costal and far more towards base, the fascia outwardly and both spots inwardly edged blackish brown, a broad white costal streak from the costal spot, the apical line reduced to a small silvery spot on dorsum in the middle of the apical area and a broad shining white streak in the cilia at apex; cilia brown, paler towards dorsum. Hindwing shining brownish grey with reddish gloss; cilia brown. Underside: forewing shining greyish brown, the white costal streak and the white streak at apex distinctly visible; hindwing shining greyish brown. Abdomen dorsally shining yellowish grey to golden brown, laterally shining grey with bluish and greenish reflections, ventrally shining dark grey, in middle shining white, segments banded shining white posteriorly, anal tuft shining greyish brown.

== Biology ==
The larvae feed on Dichanthelium dichotomum. They mine the leaves of their host plant. They mine a small basal leaf in the spring, eating out almost the entire substance of the leaf. Just before pupation, it enters one of the lower stem leaves, in which it makes a small inconspicuous mine, scarcely larger than the larva, but broadening at its anterior end towards the tip of the leaf, slightly inflated, and showing us a convexity on the upper surface of the leaf. Within this cavity, which is silk-lined, pupation takes place. Beyond the pupation chamber, the mines extends a short distance forwards, but is scarcely visible except at its end, where the epidermis is almost eaten through, permitting the emergence of the imago. Adults fly in June and July in the North, early April to June farther South.
