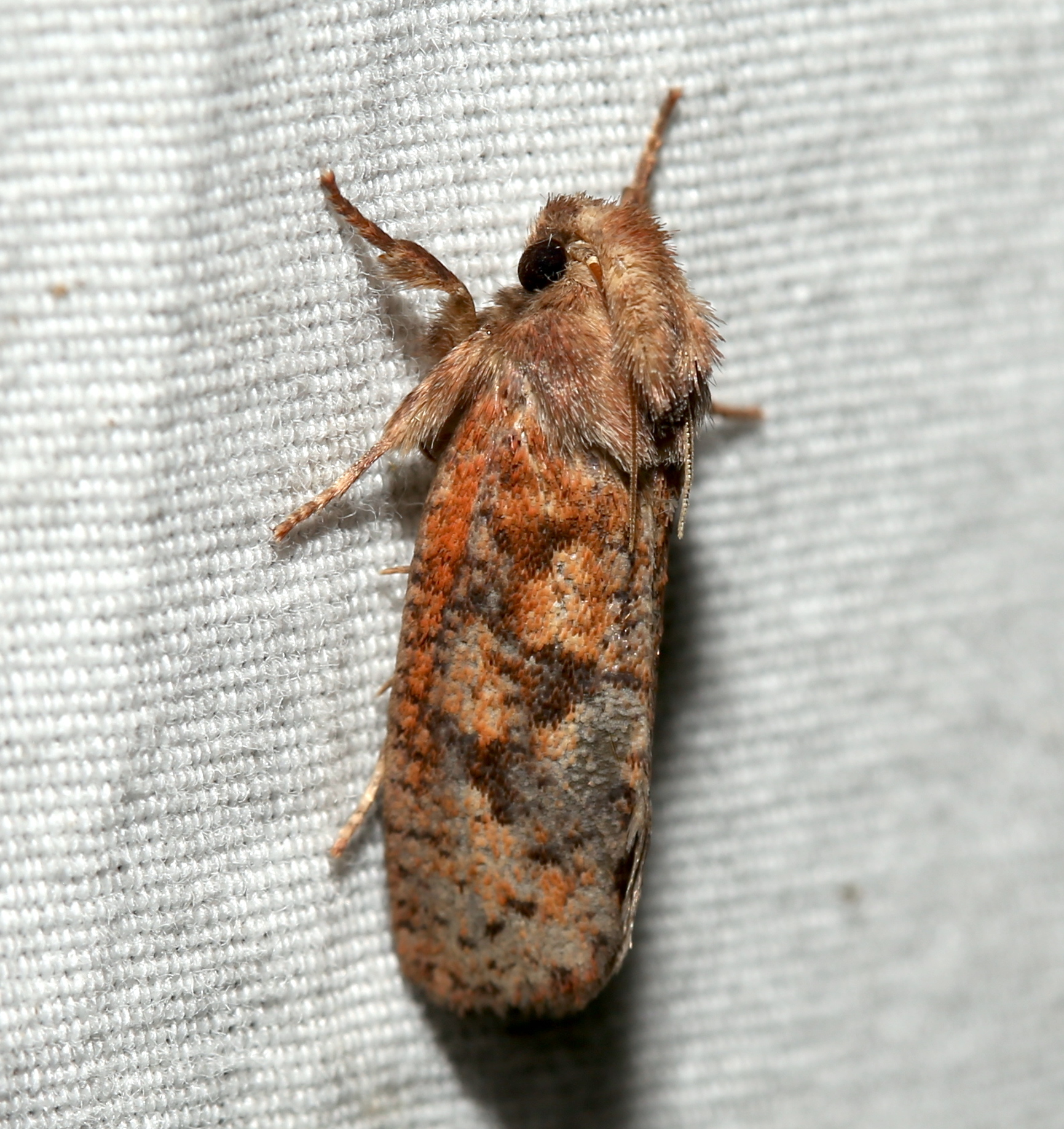

Scientific classification
- Kingdom: Animalia
- Phylum: Arthropoda
- Clade: Pancrustacea
- Class: Insecta
- Order: Lepidoptera
- Family: Tineidae
- Genus: Acrolophus
- Species: A. plumifrontella

Binomial name
- Acrolophus plumifrontella (Clemens, 1859)

Synonyms
- Anaphora plumifrontella Clemens, 1859; Anaphora bombycina Zeller, 1873; Acrolophus bombycina; Acrolophus cervinus Walsingham, 1887; Acrolophus angustipennella Beutenmüller, 1887

= Acrolophus plumifrontella =

Species of moth

Acrolophus plumifrontella, the eastern grass-tubeworm moth, is a moth of the family Acrolophidae. It is found in North America, including Alabama, Arizona, Arkansas, Florida, Georgia, Illinois, Indiana, Iowa, Kansas, Kentucky, Louisiana, Maryland, Mississippi, Missouri, New Jersey, New York, North Carolina, Ohio, Pennsylvania, South Carolina, Tennessee, Texas and Virginia.

The wingspan is about 28 mm. Adults are on wing from April to October.
