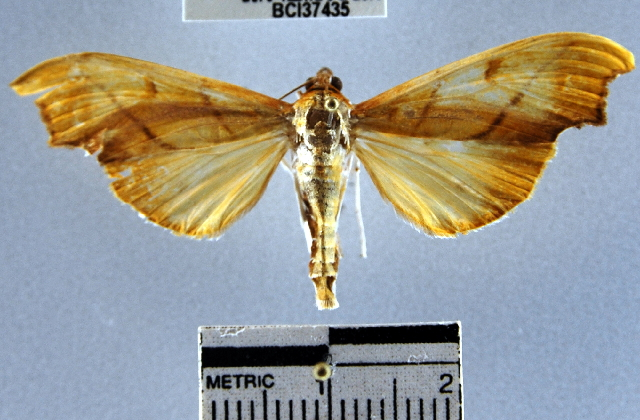

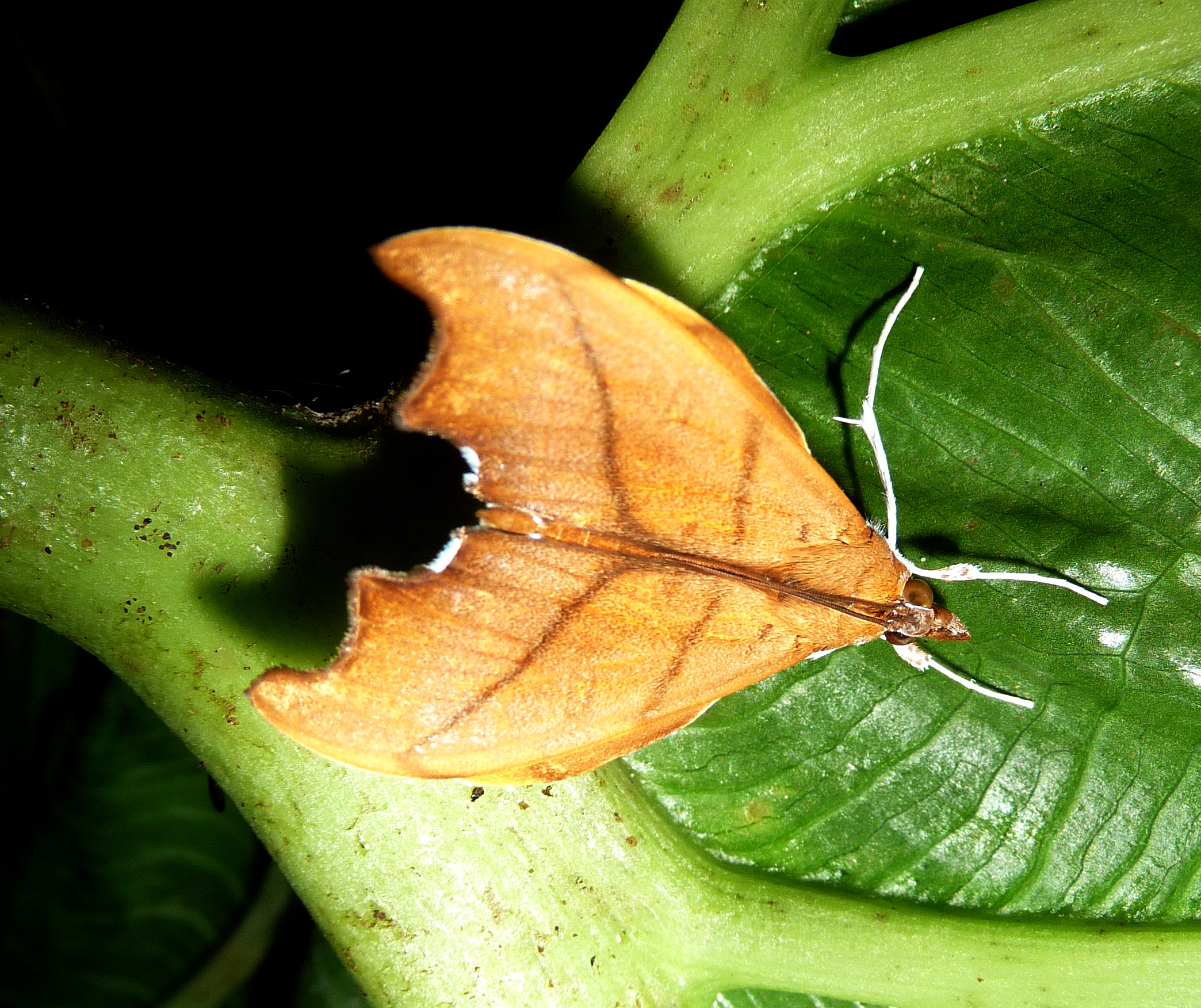

Scientific classification
- Kingdom: Animalia
- Phylum: Arthropoda
- Class: Insecta
- Order: Lepidoptera
- Family: Crambidae
- Tribe: Margaroniini
- Genus: Sparagmia; Guenée, 1854
- Species: S. gonoptera

Binomial name
- Sparagmia gonoptera (Latreille, 1828)

Synonyms
- Phalaena gonoptera Latreille, 1828; Sparagmia gigantalis Guenée, 1854

= Sparagmia =

Genus of moths

Sparagmia is a monotypic moth genus of the family Crambidae described by Achille Guenée in 1854. Its only species, Sparagmia gonoptera, described by Pierre André Latreille in 1828, is found in Central and South America and in the Antilles. Records include Argentina, Brazil, Panama, Costa Rica, Puerto Rico, Cuba and Jamaica.

== Subspecies ==
- Sparagmia gonoptera gonoptera
- Sparagmia gonoptera shoumatoffi Munroe, 1958 (Jamaica)
