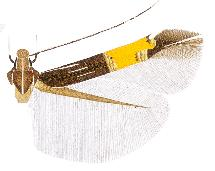

Scientific classification
- Kingdom: Animalia
- Phylum: Arthropoda
- Class: Insecta
- Order: Lepidoptera
- Family: Cosmopterigidae
- Genus: Cosmopterix
- Species: C. interfracta

Binomial name
- Cosmopterix interfracta Meyrick, 1922

= Cosmopterix interfracta =

Species of moth

Cosmopterix interfracta is a moth of the family Cosmopterigidae. It is known from Brazil (Federal District, Pará, Rio de Janeiro), Cuba, the Dominican Republic, Jamaica and Puerto Rico.

Adults have been recorded between June and October.

== Description ==
Male, female. Forewing length 3.1-3.9 mm. Head: frons shining ochreous-white; vertex shining bronze brown with reddish gloss, laterally and medially lined white, collar shining bronze brown; labial palpus first segment very short, white, second segment three-quarters of the length of third, shining dark brown with white longitudinal lines laterally and ventrally, third segment white, lined brown laterally; scape dorsally shining dark brown with a white anterior line, ventrally shining white, antenna shining dark brown, a white line from base to one-half, distal half interrupted, followed towards apex by respectively an annulate part to beyond one-half, seven to nine dark brown segments, four white, two dark brown, two white, ten dark brown and eight white segments at apex. Thorax and tegulae shining dark bronze brown with reddish gloss, thorax with a white median line, tegulae lined white inwardly. Legs: shining dark brown, foreleg with a white line on tibia and first two tarsal segments, segment four with a white apical spot, segment five entirely white, tibia of midleg with white oblique basal and medial lines and a white apical ring, tarsal segment one almost entirely white on outside, a white streak on the apical half of segment two, segment four white in the apical half, segment five entirely white, tibia of hindleg as midleg, but with a pale golden subapical ring, tarsal segments one to three with white apical rings, segment four with a white streak dorsally and segment five entirely white, spurs whitish dorsally, greyish brown ventrally. Forewing shining dark brown with reddish gloss, four narrow white lines in the basal area, a subcostal from base to one-third, bending from costa distally, a medial above fold from one-sixth to beyond the subcostal, a subdorsal as long as the medial, but further from base, a dorsal from beyond base to the middle of the subdorsal, a bright yellow-orange transverse fascia beyond the middle, strongly narrowed in dorsal half and with an apical protrusion, bordered at the inner edge by a tubercular pale golden metallic fascia with greenish and purplish reflections, the fascia tapering towards costa and with a subcostal patch of blackish scales on the outside, at outer edge bordered by two tubercular pale golden metallic costal and dorsal spots, the costal spot further from base and darker golden, the dorsal spot more than twice as large as the costal, both spots irregularly lined dark brown on the inside, the costal spot outwardly edged by a white costal streak, a silvery white apical line from beyond the apical protrusion, white and slightly widening at apex, cilia dark brown, paler towards dorsum. Hindwing shining dark greyish brown, cilia dark greyish brown. Underside: forewing shining dark brown, the white costal streak and the white apical line in the cilia distinctly visible, hindwing shining greyish brown.
