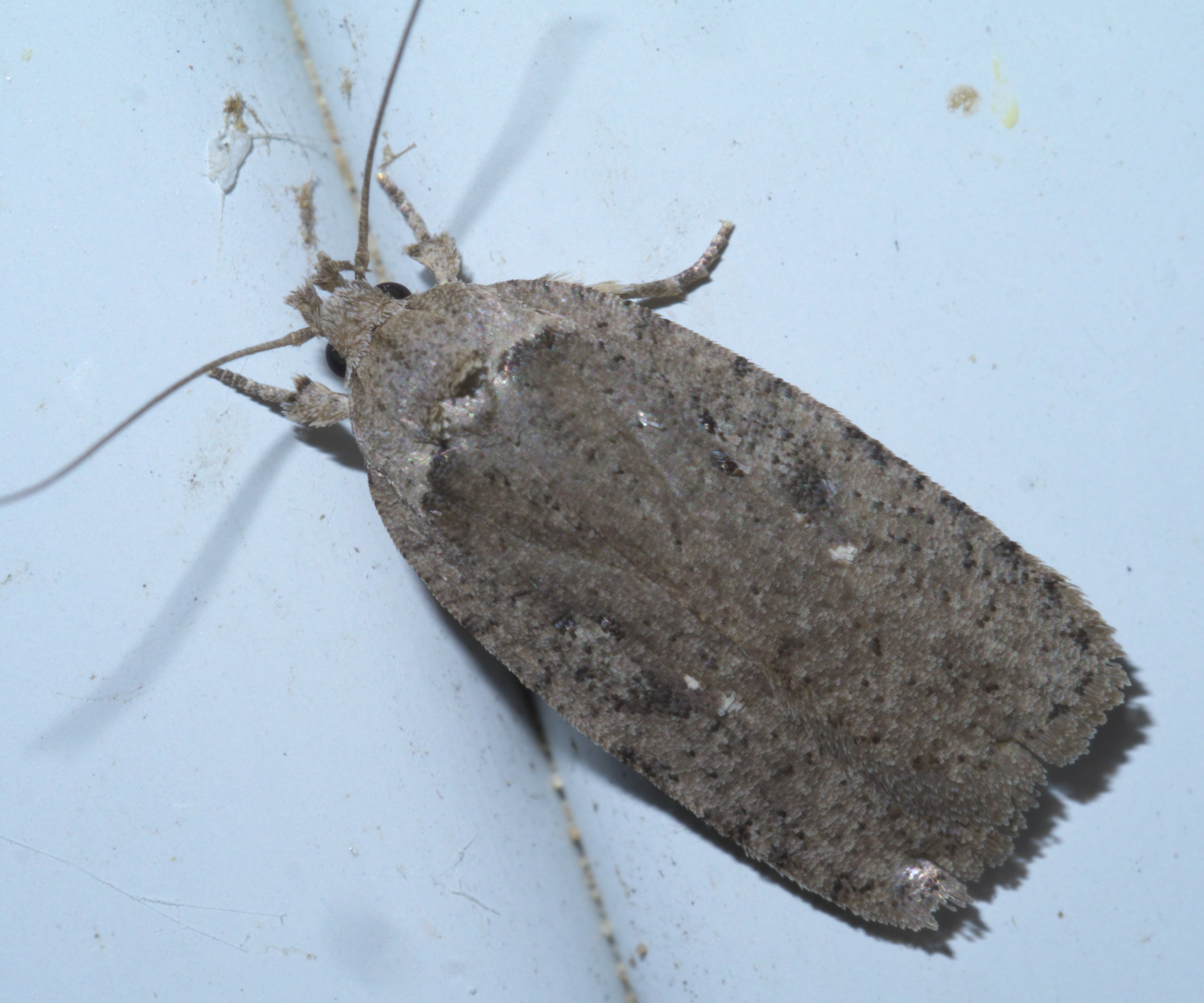

Scientific classification
- Kingdom: Animalia
- Phylum: Arthropoda
- Clade: Pancrustacea
- Class: Insecta
- Order: Lepidoptera
- Family: Depressariidae
- Genus: Agonopterix
- Species: A. argillacea

Binomial name
- Agonopterix argillacea (Walsingham, 1881)

Synonyms
- Depressaria argillacea Walsingham, 1881; Agonopteryx blacella Barnes & Busck, 1920

= Agonopterix argillacea =

Species of moth

Agonopterix argillacea is a moth in the family Depressariidae. It was described by Thomas de Grey in 1881. It is found in North America, where it has been recorded from California to British Columbia and in Manitoba, Ontario, New Brunswick, Nova Scotia, Michigan, South Dakota, Illinois, Texas, Florida and Utah.

The wingspan is 14–21 mm. The forewings are pale greyish-ochreous, irrorated with blackish fuscous scales. The pale basal patch is diffused along the costal margin, but bounded below it by an outwardly diffused but inwardly distinct blackish fuscous shade. There are two fuscous dots before the middle, followed by a blackish fuscous cloud above the middle of the wing, which reaches to a pale dirty-whitish dot immediately beyond and below it. The hindwings are pale greyish ochreous.

The larvae feed on Salix lasiolepis, Salix bebbiana, Amorpha fruticosa and Ptelea trifoliata.
