= Dichomeris indigna =

Scientific classification
- Domain: Eukaryota
- Kingdom: Animalia
- Phylum: Arthropoda
- Class: Insecta
- Order: Lepidoptera
- Family: Gelechiidae
- Genus: Dichomeris
- Species: D. indigna

Binomial name
- Dichomeris indigna (Walsingham, 1892)

Synonyms
- Ypsolopus indigna Walsingham, 1892

Species of moth

Dichomeris indigna is a moth in the family Gelechiidae. It was described by Thomas de Grey, 6th Baron Walsingham, in 1892. It is found in Puerto Rico.
