= Pyrausta cardinalis =

Scientific classification
- Kingdom: Animalia
- Phylum: Arthropoda
- Class: Insecta
- Order: Lepidoptera
- Family: Crambidae
- Genus: Pyrausta
- Species: P. cardinalis

Binomial name
- Pyrausta cardinalis (Guenée, 1854)

Synonyms
- Synchromia cardinalis Guenée, 1854; Synchromia coccinealis Walker, 1865

Species of moth

Pyrausta cardinalis is a moth in the family Crambidae. It was described by Achille Guenée in 1854. It is found in Florida, Cuba, the Dominican Republic and on the Virgin Islands and Puerto Rico.

The wingspan is about 12 mm. Adults have been recorded on wing in March in Florida.
