= Scopula innominata =

Scientific classification
- Domain: Eukaryota
- Kingdom: Animalia
- Phylum: Arthropoda
- Class: Insecta
- Order: Lepidoptera
- Family: Geometridae
- Genus: Scopula
- Species: S. innominata

Binomial name
- Scopula innominata Schaus, 1940

Species of geometer moth in subfamily Sterrhinae

Scopula innominata is a moth of the family Geometridae. It is found in Puerto Rico.
