= Hellinsia unicolor =

Scientific classification
- Domain: Eukaryota
- Kingdom: Animalia
- Phylum: Arthropoda
- Class: Insecta
- Order: Lepidoptera
- Family: Pterophoridae
- Genus: Hellinsia
- Species: H. unicolor

Binomial name
- Hellinsia unicolor (Barnes & McDunnough, 1913)

Synonyms
- Oidaematophorus unicolor Barnes & McDunnough, 1913

Species of moth

Hellinsia unicolor is a moth of the family Pterophoridae described by William Barnes and James Halliday McDunnough in 1913. It is found in North America, including Florida, Mississippi, Georgia and Kentucky.

The wingspan is about 14–20 mm.

The larvae feed on Eupatorium capillifolium. They bore in the stem and roots of their host plant.
