= Anateinoma =

Scientific classification
- Domain: Eukaryota
- Kingdom: Animalia
- Phylum: Arthropoda
- Class: Insecta
- Order: Lepidoptera
- Superfamily: Noctuoidea
- Family: Noctuidae
- Subfamily: Acontiinae
- Genus: Anateinoma; Möschler, 1890
- Species: A. affabilis

Binomial name
- Anateinoma affabilis Möschler, 1890

Genus and species of moth

Anateinoma is a monotypic moth genus of the family Noctuidae. Its only species, Anateinoma affabilis, is found in Puerto Rico and the Virgin Islands. Both the genus and species were first described by Heinrich Benno Möschler in 1890.
