= Apinoglossa =

Scientific classification
- Domain: Eukaryota
- Kingdom: Animalia
- Phylum: Arthropoda
- Class: Insecta
- Order: Lepidoptera
- Family: Tortricidae
- Genus: Apinoglossa; Saalmuller, 1891
- Species: A. comburana

Binomial name
- Apinoglossa comburana Moschler, 1891

Genus of tortrix moths

Apinoglossa is a genus of leafroller moths in the family Tortricidae. This genus has a single species, Apinoglossa comburana, found in Puerto Rico.

== See also ==
- List of Tortricidae genera
