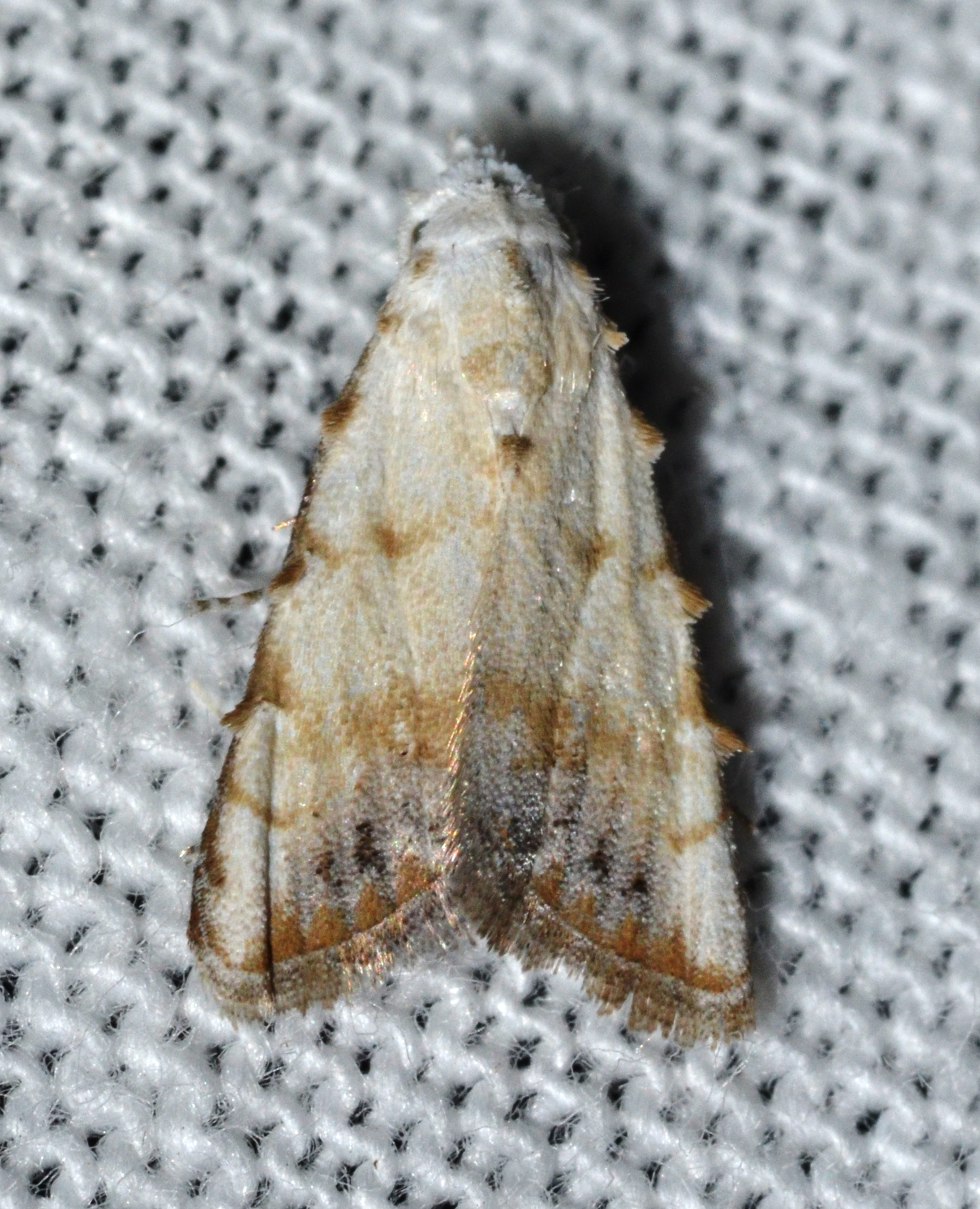

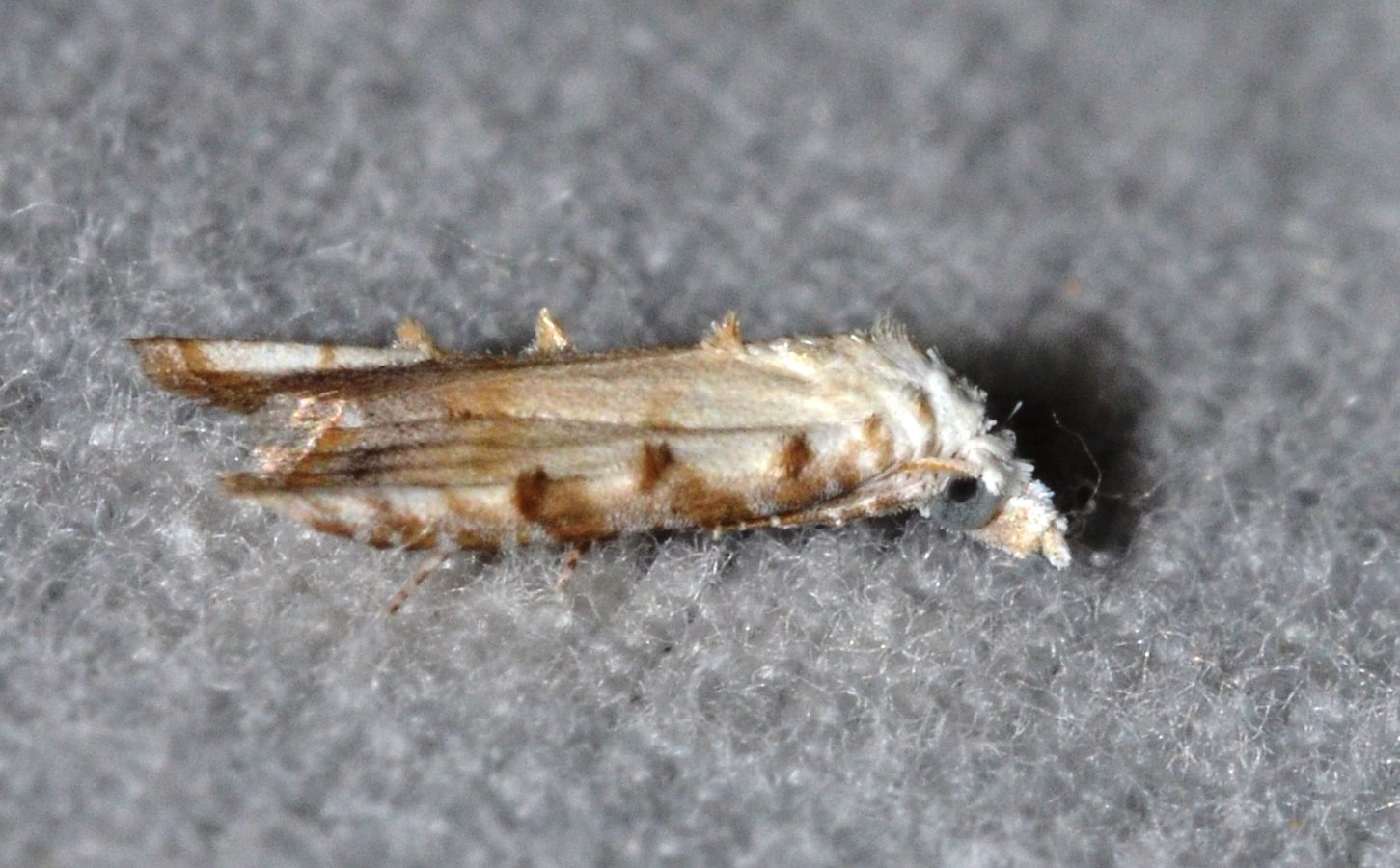

Scientific classification
- Kingdom: Animalia
- Phylum: Arthropoda
- Class: Insecta
- Order: Lepidoptera
- Superfamily: Noctuoidea
- Family: Nolidae
- Genus: Nola
- Species: N. cereella

Binomial name
- Nola cereella (Bosc, [1800])

Synonyms
- Nola sorghiella; Nola portoricensis; Celama sorghiella

= Nola cereella =

Species of moth

Nola cereella, the sorghum webworm, is a moth of the family Nolidae. It is kin to the Noctuidae, also called Tuft moth due to the presence of its tufted scales. The species was first described by Louis Augustin Guillaume Bosc in 1800. It is found in the southeastern parts of the United States, from Texas to Florida, and north to New York. From North America its range extends southward through Puerto Rico and Suriname down to Argentina.

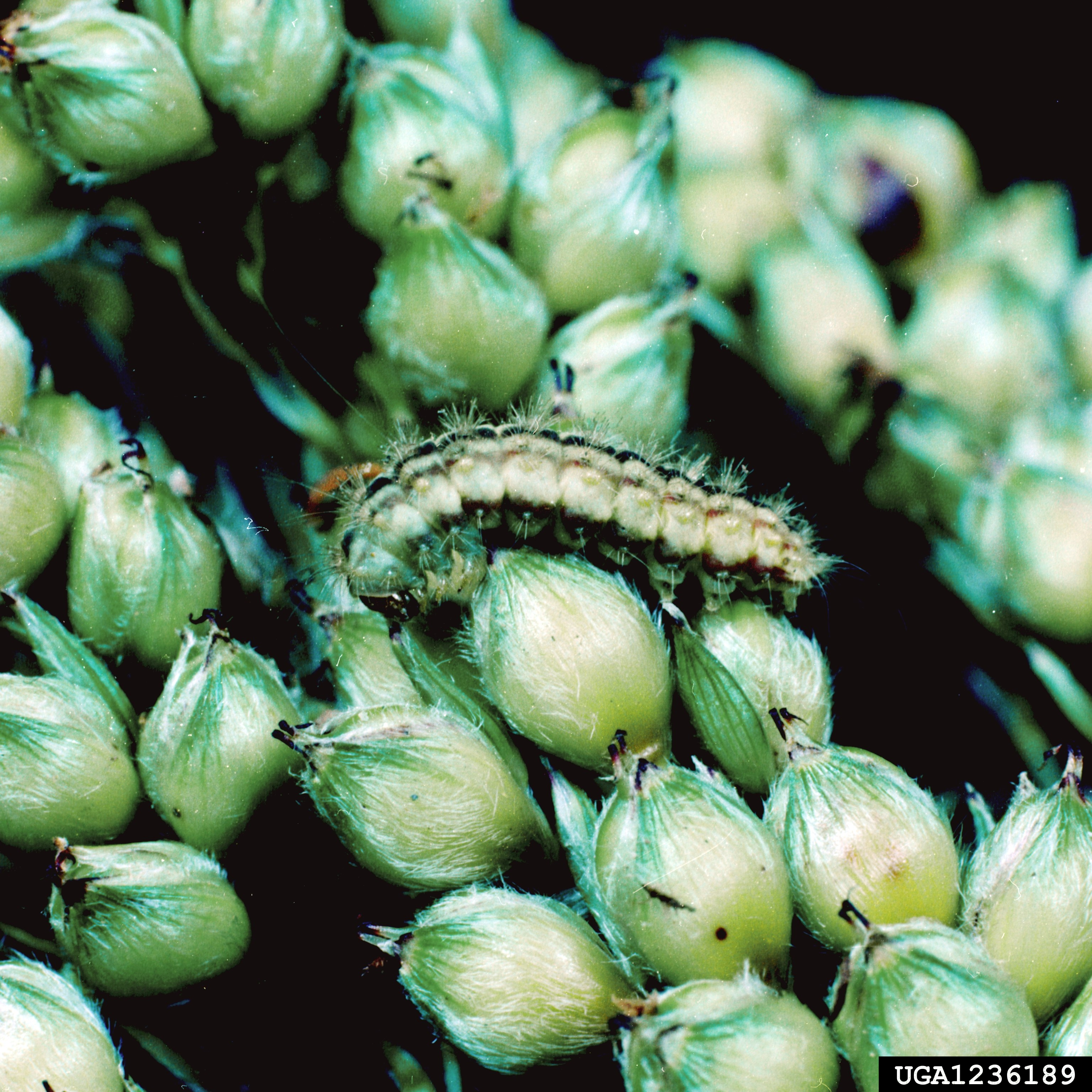
Larva

The wingspan is 12–18 mm. Adults are on wing from July to September depending on the location.

The larvae feed on Sorghum vulgare.
