= William T. M. Forbes =

American entomologist

William Trowbridge Merrifield Forbes (April 23, 1885, Westborough, Massachusetts – April 12, 1968, Worcester, Massachusetts) was an American entomologist who specialized in Lepidoptera and Coleoptera.

== Works ==
Partial list:

Coleoptera

- The wing-venation of the Coleoptera. Annals of the Entomological Society of America 15:328–345, pls.29–35 (1922).
- The wing folding patterns of the Coleoptera. Journal of the New York Entomological Society 34:42–68, 91–115, pls.7–18 (1926).

Lepidoptera

- The Lepidoptera of New York and Neighboring States: 1. Primitive forms, Microlepidoptera, Pyraloids, Bombyces. Memoir 68. Ithaca, NY: Cornell University Agricultural Experiment Station. 729 p. (1923).
- The Lepidoptera of New York and Neighboring States: 2. Geometridae, Sphingidae, Notodontidae, Lymantriidae. Memoir 274. Ithaca, NY: Cornell University Agricultural Experiment Station. 263 p. (1948).
- The Lepidoptera of New York and Neighboring States: 3. Noctuidae. Memoir 329. Ithaca, NY: Cornell University Agricultural Experiment Station. 433 p. (1954)
- The Lepidoptera of New York and Neighboring States: 4. Agaristidae through Nymphalidae including butterflies. Memoir 371. Ithaca, NY: Cornell University Agricultural Experiment Station. 188 p. (1960)
