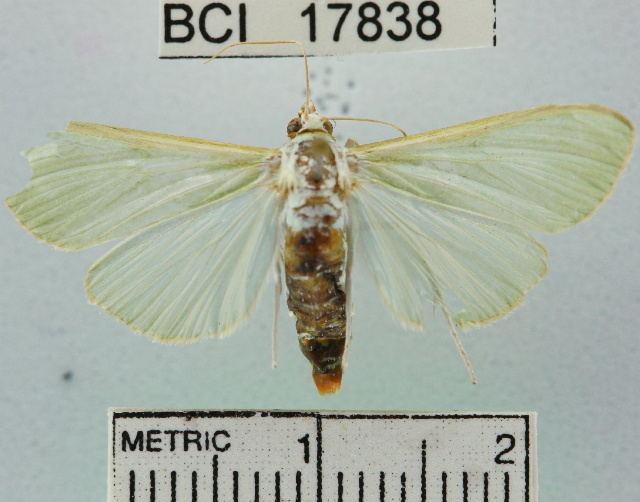

Scientific classification
- Kingdom: Animalia
- Phylum: Arthropoda
- Class: Insecta
- Order: Lepidoptera
- Family: Crambidae
- Genus: Diaphania
- Species: D. esmeralda

Binomial name
- Diaphania esmeralda (Hampson, 1899)

Synonyms
- Noorda esmeralda Hampson, 1899

= Diaphania esmeralda =

Species of moth

Diaphania esmeralda is a moth in the family Crambidae. It was described by George Hampson in 1899. It is found in Mexico (Xalapa), Honduras, Panama, and Venezuela.
