= Diaphania andringitralis =

Scientific classification
- Kingdom: Animalia
- Phylum: Arthropoda
- Class: Insecta
- Order: Lepidoptera
- Family: Crambidae
- Genus: Diaphania
- Species: D. andringitralis

Binomial name
- Diaphania andringitralis Viette, 1960

Species of moth

Diaphania andringitralis is a moth in the family Crambidae. It was described by Viette in 1960. It is found in Madagascar.
