= Diaphania magdalenae =

Scientific classification
- Kingdom: Animalia
- Phylum: Arthropoda
- Class: Insecta
- Order: Lepidoptera
- Family: Crambidae
- Genus: Diaphania
- Species: D. magdalenae

Binomial name
- Diaphania magdalenae (Hampson, 1899)

Synonyms
- Glyphodes magdalenae Hampson, 1899

Species of moth

Diaphania magdalenae is a moth in the family Crambidae. It was described by George Hampson in 1899. It is found in Mexico, Costa Rica, Colombia, Venezuela, Ecuador and Brazil.

The length of the forewings is 11.3–12 mm.
