= Diaphania antillia =

Scientific classification
- Domain: Eukaryota
- Kingdom: Animalia
- Phylum: Arthropoda
- Class: Insecta
- Order: Lepidoptera
- Family: Crambidae
- Genus: Diaphania
- Species: D. antillia

Binomial name
- Diaphania antillia Munroe, 1960

Species of moth

Diaphania antillia is a moth in the family Crambidae. It was described by Eugene G. Munroe in 1960. It is found in Haiti, the Dominican Republic and Cuba.
