= Diaphania meridialis =

Scientific classification
- Domain: Eukaryota
- Kingdom: Animalia
- Phylum: Arthropoda
- Class: Insecta
- Order: Lepidoptera
- Family: Crambidae
- Genus: Diaphania
- Species: D. meridialis

Binomial name
- Diaphania meridialis Yamanaka, 1972

Species of moth

Diaphania meridialis is a moth in the family Crambidae. It was described by Hiroshi Yamanaka in 1972. It is found in Taiwan.
