= Diaphania clavata =

Scientific classification
- Kingdom: Animalia
- Phylum: Arthropoda
- Class: Insecta
- Order: Lepidoptera
- Family: Crambidae
- Genus: Diaphania
- Species: D. clavata

Binomial name
- Diaphania clavata (Hampson, 1912)

Synonyms
- Glyphodes clavata Hampson, 1912

Species of moth

Diaphania clavata is a moth in the family Crambidae. It was described by George Hampson in 1912. It is found in Guatemala.
