= Diaphania attigua =

Scientific classification
- Domain: Eukaryota
- Kingdom: Animalia
- Phylum: Arthropoda
- Class: Insecta
- Order: Lepidoptera
- Family: Crambidae
- Genus: Diaphania
- Species: D. attigua

Binomial name
- Diaphania attigua (E. Hering, 1906)

Synonyms
- Eudioptis attigua E. Hering, 1906; Margaronia marginepuncta Schaus, 1920

Species of moth

Diaphania attigua is a moth in the family Crambidae. It was described by E. Hering in 1906. It is found in Jamaica.
