= Diaphania terminalis =

Scientific classification
- Domain: Eukaryota
- Kingdom: Animalia
- Phylum: Arthropoda
- Class: Insecta
- Order: Lepidoptera
- Family: Crambidae
- Genus: Diaphania
- Species: D. terminalis

Binomial name
- Diaphania terminalis (Maassen, 1890)

Synonyms
- Phakellura terminalis Maassen, 1890

Species of moth

Diaphania terminalis is a moth in the family Crambidae. It is found in Ecuador.
