= Diaphania phlebitis =

Scientific classification
- Kingdom: Animalia
- Phylum: Arthropoda
- Class: Insecta
- Order: Lepidoptera
- Family: Crambidae
- Genus: Diaphania
- Species: D. phlebitis

Binomial name
- Diaphania phlebitis (Hampson, 1912)

Synonyms
- Glyphodes phlebitis Hampson, 1912

Species of moth

Diaphania phlebitis is a moth in the family Crambidae. It was described by George Hampson in 1912. It is found in Peru.
