= Diaphania argealis =

Scientific classification
- Kingdom: Animalia
- Phylum: Arthropoda
- Class: Insecta
- Order: Lepidoptera
- Family: Crambidae
- Genus: Diaphania
- Species: D. argealis

Binomial name
- Diaphania argealis (Walker, 1859)

Synonyms
- Margaronia argealis Walker, 1859; Eudioptis aclista Meyrick, 1936; Glyphodes semibrunnea Druce, 1902; Margaronia auricostalis Walker, 1862

Species of moth

Diaphania argealis is a moth in the family Crambidae. It was described by Francis Walker in 1859. It is found in Brazil, Peru, Ecuador, Venezuela, and Costa Rica. Its habitat consists of rain forests.
