= Diaphania flavicaput =

Scientific classification
- Kingdom: Animalia
- Phylum: Arthropoda
- Class: Insecta
- Order: Lepidoptera
- Family: Crambidae
- Genus: Diaphania
- Species: D. flavicaput

Binomial name
- Diaphania flavicaput (Hampson, 1899)

Synonyms
- Glyphodes flavicaput Hampson, 1899; Hoterodes flavicaput

Species of moth

Diaphania flavicaput is a moth in the family Crambidae. It was described by George Hampson in 1899. It is found in Rio de Janeiro, Brazil.
