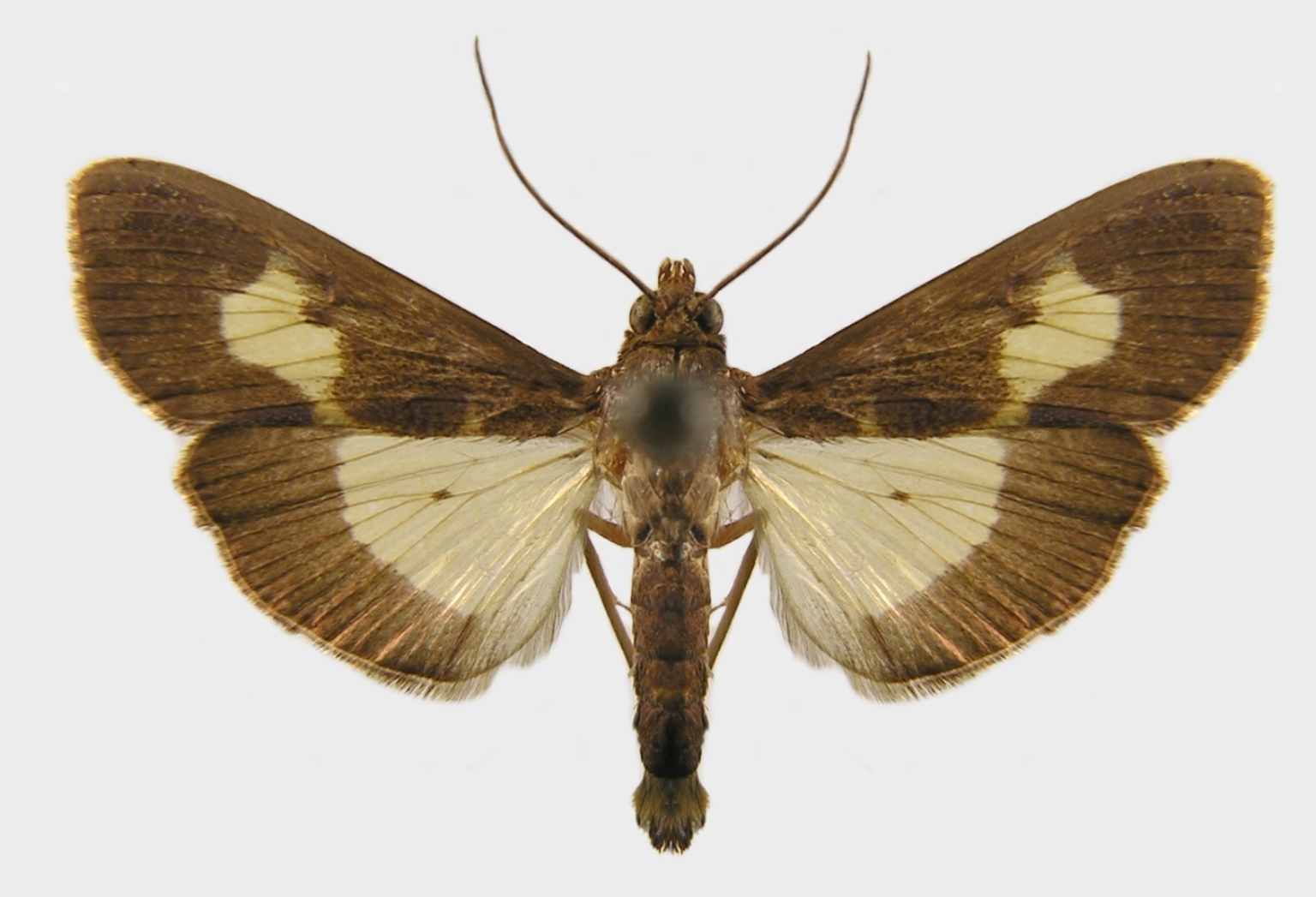

Scientific classification
- Domain: Eukaryota
- Kingdom: Animalia
- Phylum: Arthropoda
- Class: Insecta
- Order: Lepidoptera
- Family: Crambidae
- Genus: Diaphania
- Species: D. nitidalis

Binomial name
- Diaphania nitidalis (Stoll, 1781)

Synonyms
- Phalaena Pyralis nitidalis Stoll in Cramer & Stoll, 1781; Diaphania vitralis Hübner, 1809–1818

= Diaphania nitidalis =

Pickleworm

Species of insect

Diaphania nitidalis, the pickleworm, is a serious agricultural pest insect in the family Crambidae. It damages squash primarily, but it is also a common pest of other cucurbits such as cucumbers and melons. It is a tropical species which can be found in the southern United States. In the southern United States, earlier plants are less affected compared to later plantings. It does not tolerate cold temperatures. The species was first described by Caspar Stoll in 1781.

The pickleworm adult is a flashy moth with wide triangular wings and a wingspan of about one inch. The wings are mostly iridescent brown with a central band of yellow and thin white borders. The legs are white. The abdomen is mostly brown except for the tail segment, which is white and has a large fluffy tuft. Adults are not active during daylight hours and eggs are laid only at night. It lays tiny eggs in small clusters on growing areas of the plant, such as flowers, shoots, and new leaf buds. These areas are the feeding spots for the larvae, which emerge after a few days and eat voraciously for two weeks. The younger larvae are thin white caterpillars with numerous small black spots. As the larvae mature they become plump and darker in color and they lose their spots. The larvae tuck themselves into crumpled dead leaves to pupate for 8 to 10 days. The life cycle varies by environmental conditions ranging from 22 to 55 days. In warm areas the pickleworm can produce four generations per year.

== Infestation and impacts ==
Pickleworm damage on cucurbit crops is evidenced by the lack of flowers and new leaves and shoots, as these are the first parts of the plant to be consumed. The larvae also eat the fruit, burrowing down into the flesh and leaving a hole marked with a pile of white frass.

Squash varieties that showed some resistance to pickleworms include the varieties butternut, Golden Hubbard, and Improved Green Hubbard. Summer squash varieties tend to be susceptible to pickleworm damage.

== Gallery ==
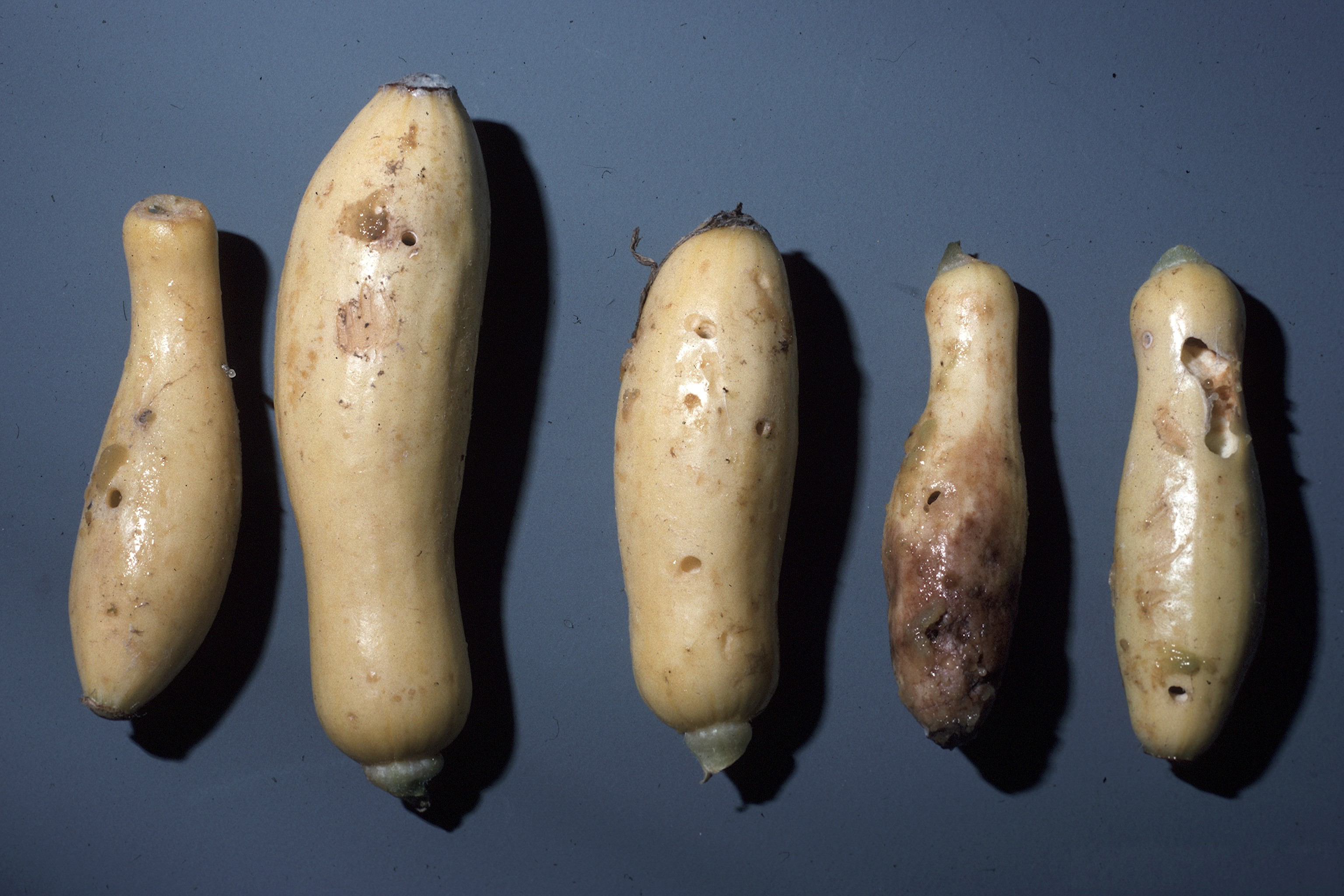

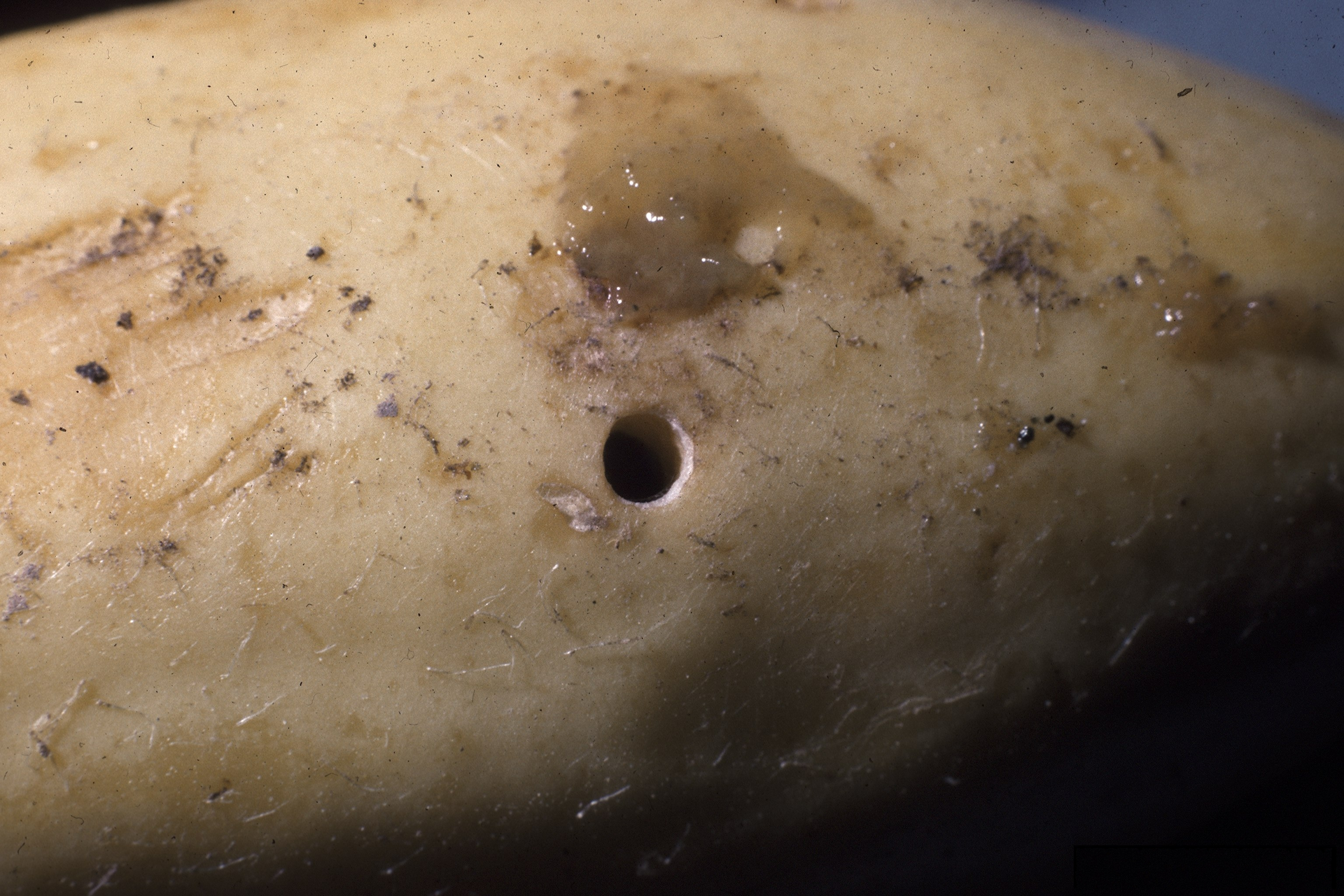

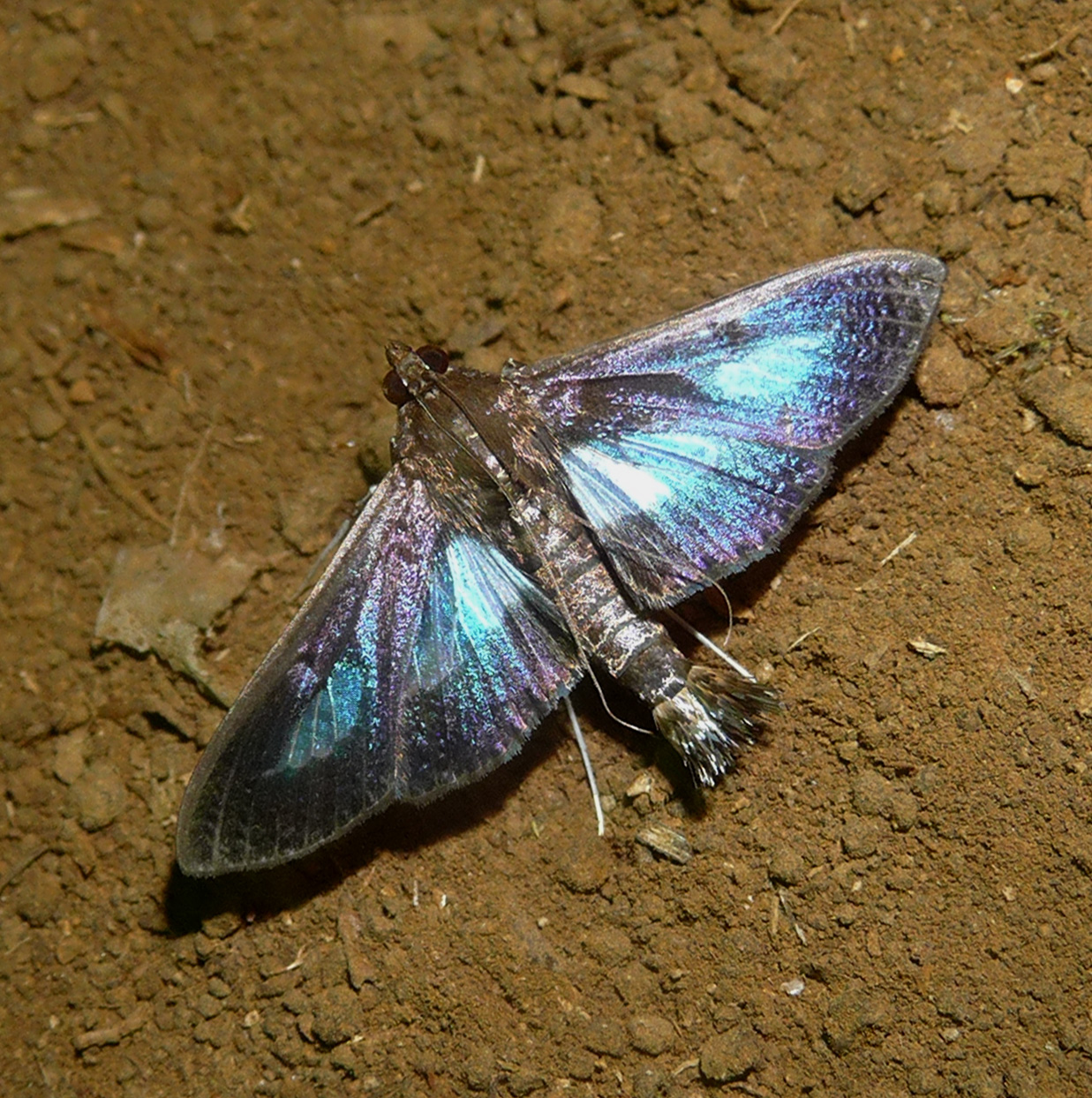
