= Diaphania beckeri =

Scientific classification
- Kingdom: Animalia
- Phylum: Arthropoda
- Class: Insecta
- Order: Lepidoptera
- Family: Crambidae
- Genus: Diaphania
- Species: D. beckeri

Binomial name
- Diaphania beckeri Clavijo & Munroe, 1996

Species of moth

Diaphania beckeri is a moth in the family Crambidae. It was described by Jose A. Clavuo-A. and Eugene G. Munroe in 1996. It is found in Central America and South America.
