= Diaphania fenestralis =

Scientific classification
- Domain: Eukaryota
- Kingdom: Animalia
- Phylum: Arthropoda
- Class: Insecta
- Order: Lepidoptera
- Family: Crambidae
- Genus: Diaphania
- Species: D. fenestralis

Binomial name
- Diaphania fenestralis Amsel, 1956

Species of moth

Diaphania fenestralis is a moth in the family Crambidae. It was described by Hans Georg Amsel in 1956. It is found in Venezuela.
