= Diaphania infernalis =

Scientific classification
- Domain: Eukaryota
- Kingdom: Animalia
- Phylum: Arthropoda
- Class: Insecta
- Order: Lepidoptera
- Family: Crambidae
- Genus: Diaphania
- Species: D. infernalis

Binomial name
- Diaphania infernalis (Möschler, 1890)

Synonyms
- Phacellura infernalis Möschler, 1890

Species of moth

Diaphania infernalis is a moth in the family Crambidae. It was described by Heinrich Benno Möschler in 1890. It is found in Puerto Rico.
