= Diaphania oriolalis =

Scientific classification
- Kingdom: Animalia
- Phylum: Arthropoda
- Class: Insecta
- Order: Lepidoptera
- Family: Crambidae
- Genus: Diaphania
- Species: D. oriolalis

Binomial name
- Diaphania oriolalis Viette, 1958

Species of moth

Diaphania oriolalis is a moth in the family Crambidae. It was described by Viette in 1958. It is found on the Comoros, where it has been recorded from Grande Comore.
