= Diaphania holophaealis =

Scientific classification
- Kingdom: Animalia
- Phylum: Arthropoda
- Class: Insecta
- Order: Lepidoptera
- Family: Crambidae
- Genus: Diaphania
- Species: D. holophaealis

Binomial name
- Diaphania holophaealis (Hampson, 1900)

Synonyms
- Glyphodes holophaealis Hampson, 1900

Species of moth

Diaphania holophaealis is a moth in the family Crambidae. It was described by George Hampson in 1900. It has been recorded from Christmas Island, 1,550 km northwest of Australia.
