= Diaphania adelalis =

Scientific classification
- Domain: Eukaryota
- Kingdom: Animalia
- Phylum: Arthropoda
- Class: Insecta
- Order: Lepidoptera
- Family: Crambidae
- Genus: Diaphania
- Species: D. adelalis

Binomial name
- Diaphania adelalis (Dognin, 1905)

Synonyms
- Glyphodes adelalis Dognin, 1905

Species of moth

Diaphania adelalis is a moth in the family Crambidae. It was described by Paul Dognin in 1905. It is found in Loja Province, Ecuador.
