= Diaphania atomosalis =

Scientific classification
- Domain: Eukaryota
- Kingdom: Animalia
- Phylum: Arthropoda
- Class: Insecta
- Order: Lepidoptera
- Family: Crambidae
- Genus: Diaphania
- Species: D. atomosalis

Binomial name
- Diaphania atomosalis (Dognin, 1908)

Synonyms
- Glyphodes atomosalis Dognin, 1908

Species of moth

Diaphania atomosalis is a moth in the family Crambidae. It was described by Paul Dognin in 1908. It is found in Peru.
