= Diaphania latilimbalis =

Scientific classification
- Domain: Eukaryota
- Kingdom: Animalia
- Phylum: Arthropoda
- Class: Insecta
- Order: Lepidoptera
- Family: Crambidae
- Genus: Diaphania
- Species: D. latilimbalis

Binomial name
- Diaphania latilimbalis (Guenée, 1854)

Synonyms
- Phakellura latilimbalis Guenée, 1854

Species of moth

Diaphania latilimbalis is a moth in the family Crambidae described by Achille Guenée in 1854. Found in Mexico, Guatemala, Honduras, Venezuela and Brazil, the habitat consists of tropical rainforests and cloud forests.

The length of the forewings is 13–16 mm for males and 13.6–17 mm for females.
