= Diaphania interpositalis =

Scientific classification
- Kingdom: Animalia
- Phylum: Arthropoda
- Class: Insecta
- Order: Lepidoptera
- Family: Crambidae
- Genus: Diaphania
- Species: D. interpositalis

Binomial name
- Diaphania interpositalis (Hampson, 1912)

Synonyms
- Glyphodes interpositalis Hampson, 1912

Species of moth

Diaphania interpositalis is a moth in the family Crambidae. It was described by George Hampson in 1912. It is found in the Brazilian states of Santa Catarina, Paraná and São Paulo.

The length of the forewings is 11-11.5 mm for males and 9–11 mm for females.
