= Diaphania mirabilis =

Scientific classification
- Domain: Eukaryota
- Kingdom: Animalia
- Phylum: Arthropoda
- Class: Insecta
- Order: Lepidoptera
- Family: Crambidae
- Genus: Diaphania
- Species: D. mirabilis

Binomial name
- Diaphania mirabilis (H. Druce, 1902)

Synonyms
- Glyphodes mirabilis H. Druce, 1902; Glyphodes decapitalis Dognin, 1903

Species of moth

Diaphania mirabilis is a moth in the family Crambidae. It was described by Herbert Druce in 1902. It is found in Guyana, Brazil, Ecuador, Peru and Bolivia. The habitat consists of cloud forests.

The length of the forewings is 13–15 mm for males and 13.6–16 mm for females.
