= Diaphania fumosalis =

Scientific classification
- Kingdom: Animalia
- Phylum: Arthropoda
- Class: Insecta
- Order: Lepidoptera
- Family: Crambidae
- Genus: Diaphania
- Species: D. fumosalis

Binomial name
- Diaphania fumosalis (Guenée, 1854)

Synonyms
- Phakellura fumosalis Guenée, 1854; Phacellura fimalis Lederer, 1863

Species of moth

Diaphania fumosalis is a moth in the family Crambidae. It was described by Achille Guenée in 1854. It is found in Brazil.
