= Diaphania grisealis =

Scientific classification
- Domain: Eukaryota
- Kingdom: Animalia
- Phylum: Arthropoda
- Class: Insecta
- Order: Lepidoptera
- Family: Crambidae
- Genus: Diaphania
- Species: D. grisealis

Binomial name
- Diaphania grisealis (Maassen, 1890)

Synonyms
- Phakellura grisealis Maassen, 1890; Eudioptis cumalis H. Druce, 1895

Species of moth

Diaphania grisealis is a moth in the family Crambidae. It was described by Peter Maassen in 1890. It is found in Ecuador and Costa Rica.
