= Diaphania novicialis =

Scientific classification
- Domain: Eukaryota
- Kingdom: Animalia
- Phylum: Arthropoda
- Class: Insecta
- Order: Lepidoptera
- Family: Crambidae
- Genus: Diaphania
- Species: D. novicialis

Binomial name
- Diaphania novicialis (Schaus, 1912)

Synonyms
- Glyphodes novicialis Schaus, 1912

Species of moth

Diaphania novicialis is a moth in the family Crambidae. It was described by William Schaus in 1912. It is found in Costa Rica and Colombia.

The length of the forewings is 11.5–13 mm for males and 11.5-12.3 mm for females.
