= Diaphania hypheusalis =

Scientific classification
- Kingdom: Animalia
- Phylum: Arthropoda
- Class: Insecta
- Order: Lepidoptera
- Family: Crambidae
- Genus: Diaphania
- Species: D. hypheusalis

Binomial name
- Diaphania hypheusalis (Walker, 1859)

Synonyms
- Margaronia hypheusalis Walker, 1859

Species of moth

Diaphania hypheusalis is a moth in the family Crambidae. It was described by Francis Walker in 1859. It is found in the Amazon region.
