= Diaphania translucidalis =

Scientific classification
- Domain: Eukaryota
- Kingdom: Animalia
- Phylum: Arthropoda
- Class: Insecta
- Order: Lepidoptera
- Family: Crambidae
- Genus: Diaphania
- Species: D. translucidalis

Binomial name
- Diaphania translucidalis (Guenée, 1854)

Synonyms
- Phakellura translucidalis Guenée, 1854; Glyphodes niveocilia Hampson, 1899; Diaphania niveocilia

Species of moth

Diaphania translucidalis is a moth in the family Crambidae. It was first described by Achille Guenée in 1854. It is found in Mexico, Guatemala, Costa Rica, Puerto Rico, the Dominican Republic, Venezuela, Brazil, Peru and Bolivia.

The length of the forewings is 14–16 mm for males and 14.5–17 mm for females.
