= Diaphania lucidalis =

Scientific classification
- Kingdom: Animalia
- Phylum: Arthropoda
- Clade: Pancrustacea
- Class: Insecta
- Order: Lepidoptera
- Family: Crambidae
- Genus: Diaphania
- Species: D. lucidalis

Binomial name
- Diaphania lucidalis (Hübner, 1823)

Synonyms
- Eudioptis lucidalis Hübner, 1823; Glyphodes eurytornalis Hampson, 1912; Diaphania eurytornalis

Species of moth

Diaphania lucidalis is a moth in the family Crambidae. It was described by Jacob Hübner in 1823. It is found in Panama, Grenada, Cuba, Jamaica, Venezuela, Ecuador, Brazil, Bolivia and Paraguay.

The length of the forewings is 13–15 mm for males and 13–16 mm for females.
