= Diaphania culminalis =

Scientific classification
- Domain: Eukaryota
- Kingdom: Animalia
- Phylum: Arthropoda
- Class: Insecta
- Order: Lepidoptera
- Family: Crambidae
- Genus: Diaphania
- Species: D. culminalis

Binomial name
- Diaphania culminalis (Schaus, 1924)

Synonyms
- Margaronia culminalis Schaus, 1924

Species of moth

Diaphania culminalis is a moth in the family Crambidae. It was described by Schaus in 1924. It is found in Ecuador.
