= Diaphania elegans =

Scientific classification
- Kingdom: Animalia
- Phylum: Arthropoda
- Class: Insecta
- Order: Lepidoptera
- Family: Crambidae
- Genus: Diaphania
- Species: D. elegans

Binomial name
- Diaphania elegans (Möschler, 1890)

Synonyms
- Phacellura elegans Möschler, 1890

Species of moth

Diaphania elegans is a moth in the family Crambidae. It was described by Heinrich Benno Möschler in 1890. It is found in Puerto Rico, Hispaniola, Jamaica, Cuba, Costa Rica, Panama, Guatemala, Honduras, Mexico and southern Texas. It is also found in South America, where it has been recorded from Venezuela, Trinidad, Ecuador, Peru, Brazil, Paraguay and Argentina.

The length of the forewings is 11–14 mm for males and 12.5–15 mm for females.

Larvae have been recorded feeding on the flowers of Cucurbita maxima.
