= Diaphania albianalis =

Scientific classification
- Kingdom: Animalia
- Phylum: Arthropoda
- Class: Insecta
- Order: Lepidoptera
- Family: Crambidae
- Genus: Diaphania
- Species: D. albianalis

Binomial name
- Diaphania albianalis (Hampson, 1918)

Synonyms
- Margaronia albianalis Hampson, 1918

Species of moth

Diaphania albianalis is a moth in the family Crambidae. It was described by George Hampson in 1918. It is found in Ecuador.
