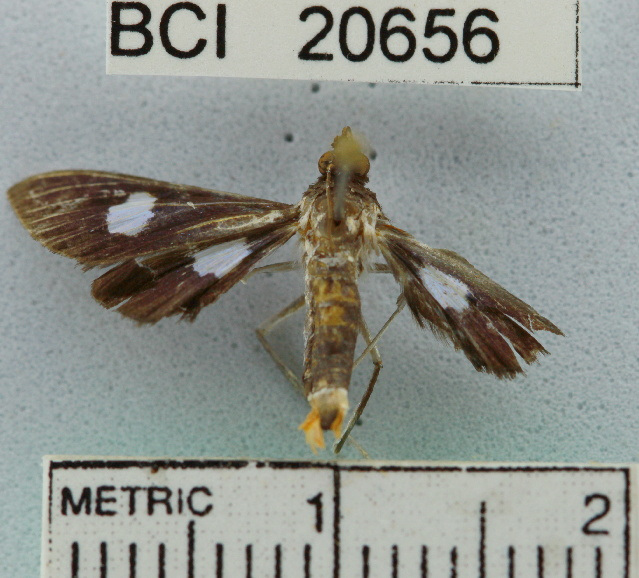

Scientific classification
- Kingdom: Animalia
- Phylum: Arthropoda
- Class: Insecta
- Order: Lepidoptera
- Family: Crambidae
- Genus: Diaphania
- Species: D. exclusalis

Binomial name
- Diaphania exclusalis (Walker, 1865)

Synonyms
- Phakellura exclusalis Walker, 1865

= Diaphania exclusalis =

Species of moth

Diaphania exclusalis is a moth in the family Crambidae. It was described by Francis Walker in 1865. It is found in Colombia, Venezuela, Ecuador, Panama, Costa Rica and Mexico.
