= Diaphania orthozonalis =

Scientific classification
- Kingdom: Animalia
- Phylum: Arthropoda
- Class: Insecta
- Order: Lepidoptera
- Family: Crambidae
- Genus: Diaphania
- Species: D. orthozonalis

Binomial name
- Diaphania orthozonalis (Hampson, 1912)

Synonyms
- Glyphodes orthozonalis Hampson, 1912

Species of moth

Diaphania orthozonalis is a moth in the family Crambidae. It was described by George Hampson in 1912. It is found in Bolivia.
