= Diaphania busccalis =

Scientific classification
- Domain: Eukaryota
- Kingdom: Animalia
- Phylum: Arthropoda
- Class: Insecta
- Order: Lepidoptera
- Family: Crambidae
- Genus: Diaphania
- Species: D. busccalis

Binomial name
- Diaphania busccalis (Schaus, 1920)

Synonyms
- Margaronia busccalis Schaus, 1920

Species of moth

Diaphania busccalis is a moth in the family Crambidae. It was described by Schaus in 1920. It is found on Hispaniola.
