= Diaphania oeditornalis =

Scientific classification
- Kingdom: Animalia
- Phylum: Arthropoda
- Class: Insecta
- Order: Lepidoptera
- Family: Crambidae
- Genus: Diaphania
- Species: D. oeditornalis

Binomial name
- Diaphania oeditornalis (Hampson, 1912)

Synonyms
- Glyphodes oeditornalis Hampson, 1912; Diaphania aeditornalis Klima, 1939

Species of moth

Diaphania oeditornalis is a moth in the family Crambidae. It was described by George Hampson in 1912. It is found in Guatemala and Venezuela.

The length of the forewings is 13.2–14 mm for males and 13.5–15 mm for females.
