= Diaphania spurcalis =

Scientific classification
- Kingdom: Animalia
- Phylum: Arthropoda
- Class: Insecta
- Order: Lepidoptera
- Family: Crambidae
- Genus: Diaphania
- Species: D. spurcalis

Binomial name
- Diaphania spurcalis (Snellen, 1875)

Synonyms
- Margarodes spurcalis Snellen, 1875

Species of moth

Diaphania spurcalis is a moth in the family Crambidae. It is found in Colombia.
