= Diaphania ochrivitralis =

Scientific classification
- Kingdom: Animalia
- Phylum: Arthropoda
- Class: Insecta
- Order: Lepidoptera
- Family: Crambidae
- Genus: Diaphania
- Species: D. ochrivitralis

Binomial name
- Diaphania ochrivitralis (Hampson, 1899)

Synonyms
- Glyphodes ochrivitralis Hampson, 1899

Species of moth

Diaphania ochrivitralis is a moth in the family Crambidae. It was described by George Hampson in 1899. It is found in Brazil and Mexico.
