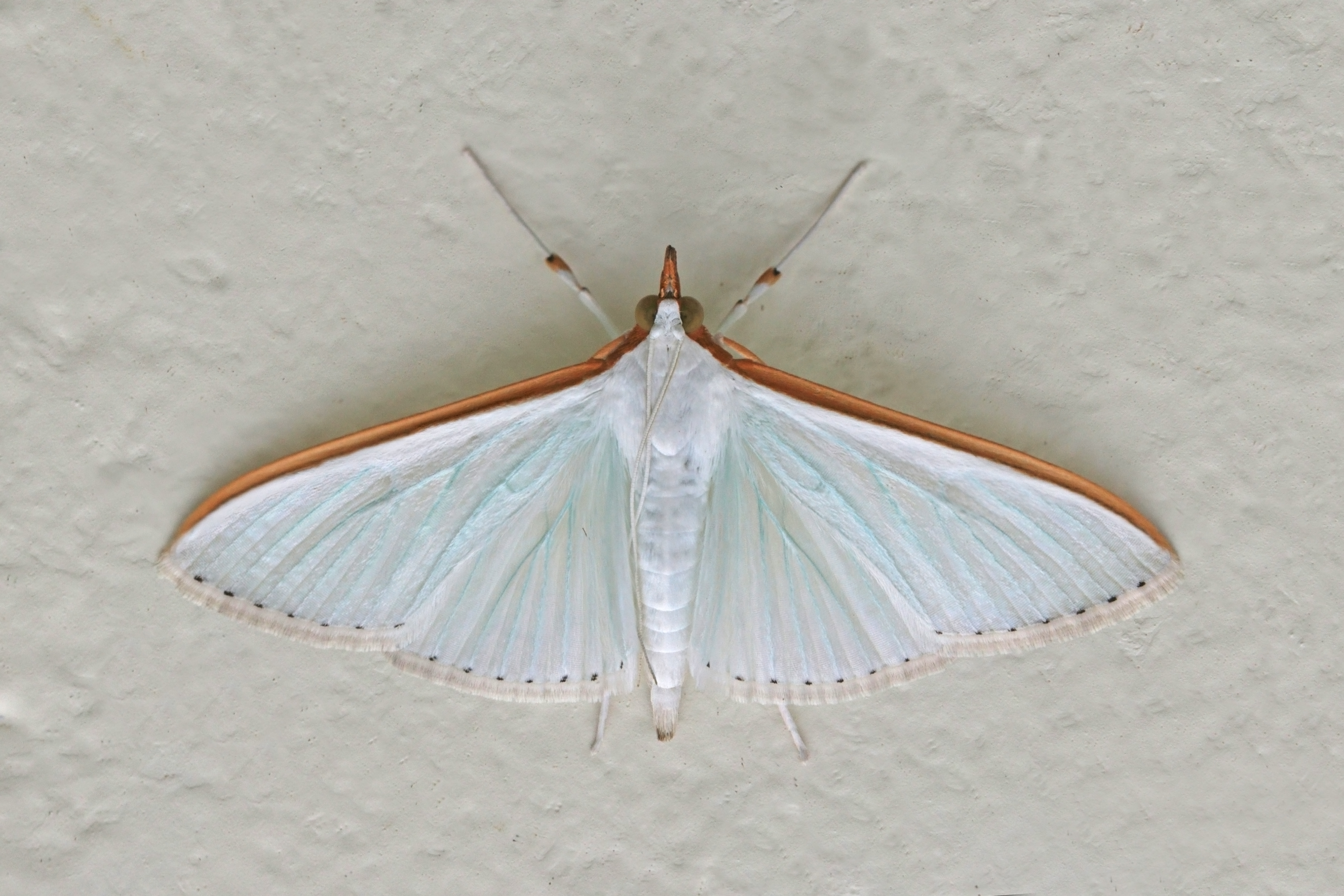
- Mount Totumas cloud forest, Panama

Scientific classification
- Domain: Eukaryota
- Kingdom: Animalia
- Phylum: Arthropoda
- Class: Insecta
- Order: Lepidoptera
- Family: Crambidae
- Genus: Diaphania
- Species: D. glauculalis

Binomial name
- Diaphania glauculalis (Guenée, 1854)

Synonyms
- Margarodes glauculalis Guenée, 1854; Margarodes lustralis Guenée, 1854; Pachyarches lustratalis Lederer, 1863

= Diaphania glauculalis =

Species of moth

Diaphania glauculalis is a moth in the family Crambidae. It was first described by Achille Guenée in 1854 and is found in Haiti, Costa Rica, Panama and Ecuador.
