= Diaphania innotata =

Scientific classification
- Domain: Eukaryota
- Kingdom: Animalia
- Phylum: Arthropoda
- Class: Insecta
- Order: Lepidoptera
- Family: Crambidae
- Genus: Diaphania
- Species: D. innotata

Binomial name
- Diaphania innotata (H. Druce, 1895)

Synonyms
- Margaronia innotata H. Druce, 1895

Species of moth

Diaphania innotata is a moth in the family Crambidae. It was described by Herbert Druce in 1895. It is found from Mexico to Panama.
