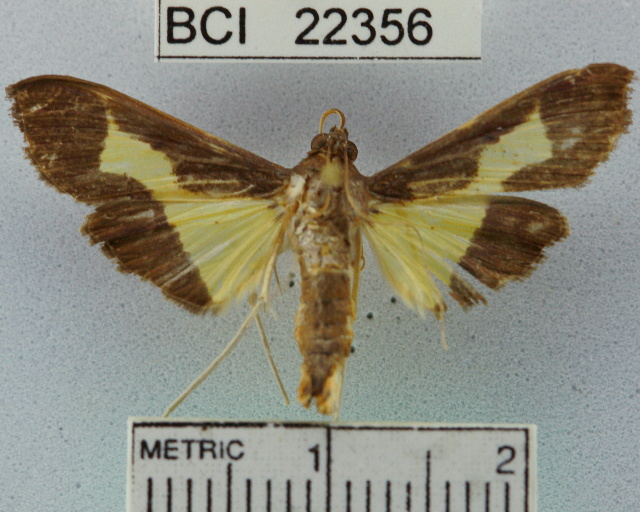

Scientific classification
- Domain: Eukaryota
- Kingdom: Animalia
- Phylum: Arthropoda
- Class: Insecta
- Order: Lepidoptera
- Family: Crambidae
- Genus: Diaphania
- Species: D. praxialis

Binomial name
- Diaphania praxialis (H. Druce, 1895)

Synonyms
- Eudioptis praxialis H. Druce, 1895; Phakellura abruptalis Snellen, 1895

= Diaphania praxialis =

Species of moth

Diaphania praxialis is a moth in the family Crambidae. It was described by Herbert Druce in 1895. It is found in Costa Rica, Panama, Colombia and Peru.
