= Diaphania monothyralis =

Scientific classification
- Kingdom: Animalia
- Phylum: Arthropoda
- Class: Insecta
- Order: Lepidoptera
- Family: Crambidae
- Genus: Diaphania
- Species: D. monothyralis

Binomial name
- Diaphania monothyralis (Hampson, 1918)

Synonyms
- Margaronia monothyralis Hampson, 1918

Species of moth

Diaphania monothyralis is a moth in the family Crambidae. It was described by George Hampson in 1918. It is found in Colombia.
