= Diaphania immaculalis =

Scientific classification
- Domain: Eukaryota
- Kingdom: Animalia
- Phylum: Arthropoda
- Class: Insecta
- Order: Lepidoptera
- Family: Crambidae
- Genus: Diaphania
- Species: D. immaculalis

Binomial name
- Diaphania immaculalis (Guenée, 1854)

Synonyms
- Phakellura immaculalis Guenée, 1854

Species of moth

Diaphania immaculalis is a moth in the family Crambidae. It was described by Achille Guenée in 1854 and is found in Guadeloupe.
