= Diaphania eumeusalis =

Scientific classification
- Kingdom: Animalia
- Phylum: Arthropoda
- Class: Insecta
- Order: Lepidoptera
- Family: Crambidae
- Genus: Diaphania
- Species: D. eumeusalis

Binomial name
- Diaphania eumeusalis (Walker, 1859)

Synonyms
- Phakellura eumeusalis Walker, 1859; Phacellura marianalis Herrich-Schäffer, 1871

Species of moth

Diaphania eumeusalis is a moth in the family Crambidae. It was described by Francis Walker in 1859. It is found in Cuba and Brazil.
