= Diaphania subtilalis =

Scientific classification
- Domain: Eukaryota
- Kingdom: Animalia
- Phylum: Arthropoda
- Class: Insecta
- Order: Lepidoptera
- Family: Crambidae
- Genus: Diaphania
- Species: D. subtilalis

Binomial name
- Diaphania subtilalis Amsel, 1956

Species of moth

Diaphania subtilalis is a moth in the family Crambidae. It is found in Venezuela.
