= Diaphania equicincta =

Scientific classification
- Kingdom: Animalia
- Phylum: Arthropoda
- Class: Insecta
- Order: Lepidoptera
- Family: Crambidae
- Genus: Diaphania
- Species: D. equicincta

Binomial name
- Diaphania equicincta (Hampson, 1912)

Synonyms
- Glyphodes equicincta Hampson, 1912

Species of moth

Diaphania equicincta is a moth in the family Crambidae. It was described by George Hampson in 1912. It is found in Mexico (Jalapa, Veracruz), Guatemala and Costa Rica.

The length of the forewings is 13.2–14 mm for males and 13.5–15 mm for females.
