= Diaphania aurogrisealis =

Scientific classification
- Kingdom: Animalia
- Phylum: Arthropoda
- Class: Insecta
- Order: Lepidoptera
- Family: Crambidae
- Genus: Diaphania
- Species: D. aurogrisealis

Binomial name
- Diaphania aurogrisealis (Hampson, 1912)

Synonyms
- Glyphodes aurogrisealis Hampson, 1912

Species of moth

Diaphania aurogrisealis is a moth in the family Crambidae. It was described by George Hampson in 1912. It is found in Costa Rica.
