= Diaphania arguta =

Scientific classification
- Domain: Eukaryota
- Kingdom: Animalia
- Phylum: Arthropoda
- Class: Insecta
- Order: Lepidoptera
- Family: Crambidae
- Genus: Diaphania
- Species: D. arguta

Binomial name
- Diaphania arguta (Lederer, 1863)

Synonyms
- Phacellura arguta Lederer, 1863

Species of moth

Diaphania arguta is a moth in the family Crambidae. It was described by Julius Lederer in 1863. It is found in Florida, Mexico, Guatemala, Costa Rica, Panama, Colombia, Venezuela, Trinidad, Tobago, Guyana, French Guiana, Suriname, Brazil, Peru and Bolivia.

The length of the forewings is 7.5–9 mm for males and 8.5-9.3 mm for females.
