= Diaphania cachinalis =

Scientific classification
- Domain: Eukaryota
- Kingdom: Animalia
- Phylum: Arthropoda
- Class: Insecta
- Order: Lepidoptera
- Family: Crambidae
- Genus: Diaphania
- Species: D. cachinalis

Binomial name
- Diaphania cachinalis (Strand, 1920)

Synonyms
- Glyphodes cachinalis Strand, 1920

Species of moth

Diaphania cachinalis is a moth in the family Crambidae. It was described by Strand in 1920. It is found in Costa Rica.
