= Diaphania nigricilialis =

Scientific classification
- Domain: Eukaryota
- Kingdom: Animalia
- Phylum: Arthropoda
- Class: Insecta
- Order: Lepidoptera
- Family: Crambidae
- Genus: Diaphania
- Species: D. nigricilialis

Binomial name
- Diaphania nigricilialis (Schaus, 1912)

Synonyms
- Glyphodes nigricilialis Schaus, 1912

Species of moth

Diaphania nigricilialis is a moth in the family Crambidae. It was described by William Schaus in 1912. It is found in Costa Rica, Colombia and Venezuela.

The length of the forewings is 12–15 mm.
