= Diaphania sahlkei =

Scientific classification
- Domain: Eukaryota
- Kingdom: Animalia
- Phylum: Arthropoda
- Class: Insecta
- Order: Lepidoptera
- Family: Crambidae
- Genus: Diaphania
- Species: D. sahlkei

Binomial name
- Diaphania sahlkei (E. Hering, 1906)

Synonyms
- Eudioptis sahlkei E. Hering, 1906

Species of moth

Diaphania sahlkei is a moth in the family Crambidae. It was described by E. Hering in 1906. It is found in French Guiana.
