= Diaphania gilvidorsis =

Scientific classification
- Domain: Eukaryota
- Kingdom: Animalia
- Phylum: Arthropoda
- Class: Insecta
- Order: Lepidoptera
- Family: Crambidae
- Genus: Diaphania
- Species: D. gilvidorsis

Binomial name
- Diaphania gilvidorsis (E. Hering, 1906)

Synonyms
- Eudioptis gilvidorsis E. Hering, 1906; Diaphania gilvidorsalis Munroe, 1995

Species of moth

Diaphania gilvidorsis is a moth in the family Crambidae. It was described by E. Hering in 1906. It is found in Ecuador, Bolivia and Peru.
