= Diaphania brunneacollis =

Scientific classification
- Domain: Eukaryota
- Kingdom: Animalia
- Phylum: Arthropoda
- Class: Insecta
- Order: Lepidoptera
- Family: Crambidae
- Genus: Diaphania
- Species: D. brunneacollis

Binomial name
- Diaphania brunneacollis (Schaus, 1920)

Synonyms
- Margaronia brunneacollis Schaus, 1920

Species of moth

Diaphania brunneacollis is a moth in the family Crambidae. It was described by Schaus in 1920. It is found in Bolivia.
