= Diaphania superalis =

Scientific classification
- Domain: Eukaryota
- Kingdom: Animalia
- Phylum: Arthropoda
- Class: Insecta
- Order: Lepidoptera
- Family: Crambidae
- Genus: Diaphania
- Species: D. superalis

Binomial name
- Diaphania superalis (Guenée, 1854)

Synonyms
- Phakellura superalis Guenée, 1854; Phakellura gigantalis Snellen, 1875

Species of moth

Diaphania superalis is a moth in the family Crambidae. It was first described by Achille Guenée in 1854. It is found in Mexico, Nicaragua, Guatemala, Colombia, Venezuela, Brazil, Ecuador, Bolivia and Peru. The habitat consists of rainforests and cloud forests.

The length of the forewings is 18–21 mm for males and 20–22 mm for females.
