= Diaphania contactalis =

Scientific classification
- Domain: Eukaryota
- Kingdom: Animalia
- Phylum: Arthropoda
- Class: Insecta
- Order: Lepidoptera
- Family: Crambidae
- Genus: Diaphania
- Species: D. contactalis

Binomial name
- Diaphania contactalis (Dognin, 1903)

Synonyms
- Glyphodes contactalis Dognin, 1903

Species of moth

Diaphania contactalis is a moth in the family Crambidae. It was described by Paul Dognin in 1903. It is found in Colombia, Venezuela, Brazil, Peru, Ecuador and Bolivia. The habitat consists of cloud forests.

The length of the forewings is 11.9–13 mm for males and 12.1–13.3 mm for females.
