= Diaphania fuscicaudalis =

Scientific classification
- Domain: Eukaryota
- Kingdom: Animalia
- Phylum: Arthropoda
- Class: Insecta
- Order: Lepidoptera
- Family: Crambidae
- Genus: Diaphania
- Species: D. fuscicaudalis

Binomial name
- Diaphania fuscicaudalis (Möschler, 1881)

Synonyms
- Eudioptis fuscicaudalis Möschler, 1881

Species of moth

Diaphania fuscicaudalis is a moth in the family Crambidae. It was described by Heinrich Benno Möschler in 1881. It is found in Brazil and Ecuador.

The length of the forewings is 13.2–14 mm for males and 14.6 mm for females.
