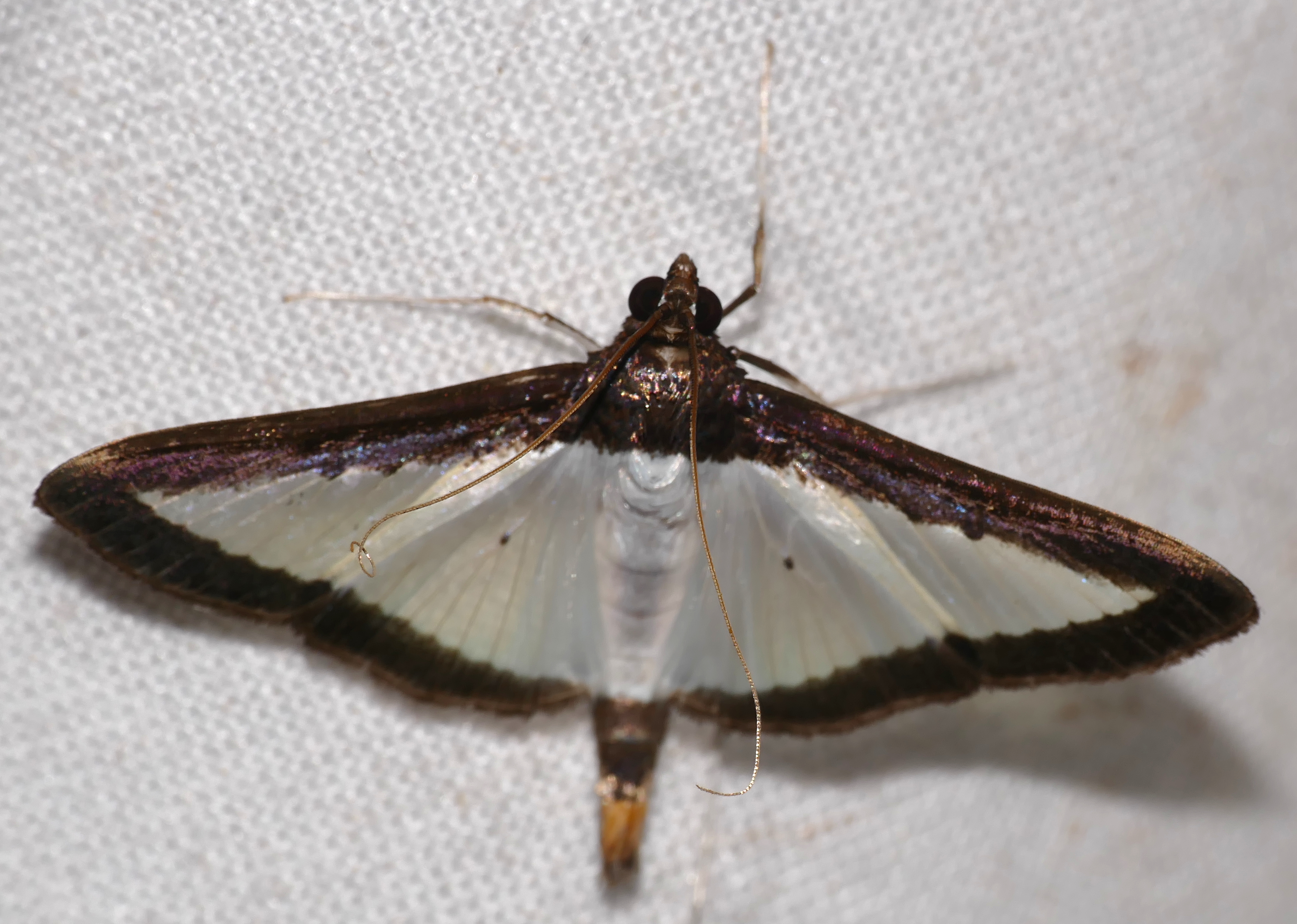

Scientific classification
- Domain: Eukaryota
- Kingdom: Animalia
- Phylum: Arthropoda
- Class: Insecta
- Order: Lepidoptera
- Family: Crambidae
- Genus: Diaphania
- Species: D. plumbidorsalis

Binomial name
- Diaphania plumbidorsalis (Guenée, 1854)

Synonyms
- Phakellura plumbidorsalis Guenée, 1854

= Diaphania plumbidorsalis =

Species of moth

Diaphania plumbidorsalis is a moth in the family Crambidae. It was described by Achille Guenée in 1854. It is found in Mexico, Venezuela, French Guiana, Suriname, Bolivia, Peru, and Brazil.

The length of the forewings is 11–14 mm.
