= Diaphania auricollis =

Scientific classification
- Kingdom: Animalia
- Phylum: Arthropoda
- Class: Insecta
- Order: Lepidoptera
- Family: Crambidae
- Genus: Diaphania
- Species: D. auricollis

Binomial name
- Diaphania auricollis (Snellen, 1875)

Synonyms
- Phakellura auricollis Snellen, 1875

Species of moth

Diaphania auricollis is a moth in the family Crambidae. It was described by Snellen in 1875. It is found in Colombia.
