= Diaphania subterminalis =

Scientific classification
- Kingdom: Animalia
- Phylum: Arthropoda
- Class: Insecta
- Order: Lepidoptera
- Family: Crambidae
- Genus: Diaphania
- Species: D. subterminalis

Binomial name
- Diaphania subterminalis (Hampson, 1912)

Synonyms
- Glyphodes subterminalis Hampson, 1912

Species of moth

Diaphania subterminalis is a moth in the family Crambidae. It was described by George Hampson in 1912. It is found in São Paulo, Brazil.
