= Diaphania dohrni =

Scientific classification
- Kingdom: Animalia
- Phylum: Arthropoda
- Class: Insecta
- Order: Lepidoptera
- Family: Crambidae
- Genus: Diaphania
- Species: D. dohrni

Binomial name
- Diaphania dohrni (Hampson, 1899)

Synonyms
- Glyphodes dohrni Hampson, 1899

Species of moth

Diaphania dohrni is a moth in the family Crambidae. It was described by George Hampson in 1899. It is found in South America.

The length of the forewings is 14 mm (0.55 in).
