= Diaphania albicincta =

Scientific classification
- Kingdom: Animalia
- Phylum: Arthropoda
- Class: Insecta
- Order: Lepidoptera
- Family: Crambidae
- Genus: Diaphania
- Species: D. albicincta

Binomial name
- Diaphania albicincta (Hampson, 1899)

Synonyms
- Glyphodes albicincta Hampson, 1899

Species of moth

Diaphania albicincta is a moth in the family Crambidae. It was described by George Hampson in 1899. It is found in São Paulo, Brazil.
