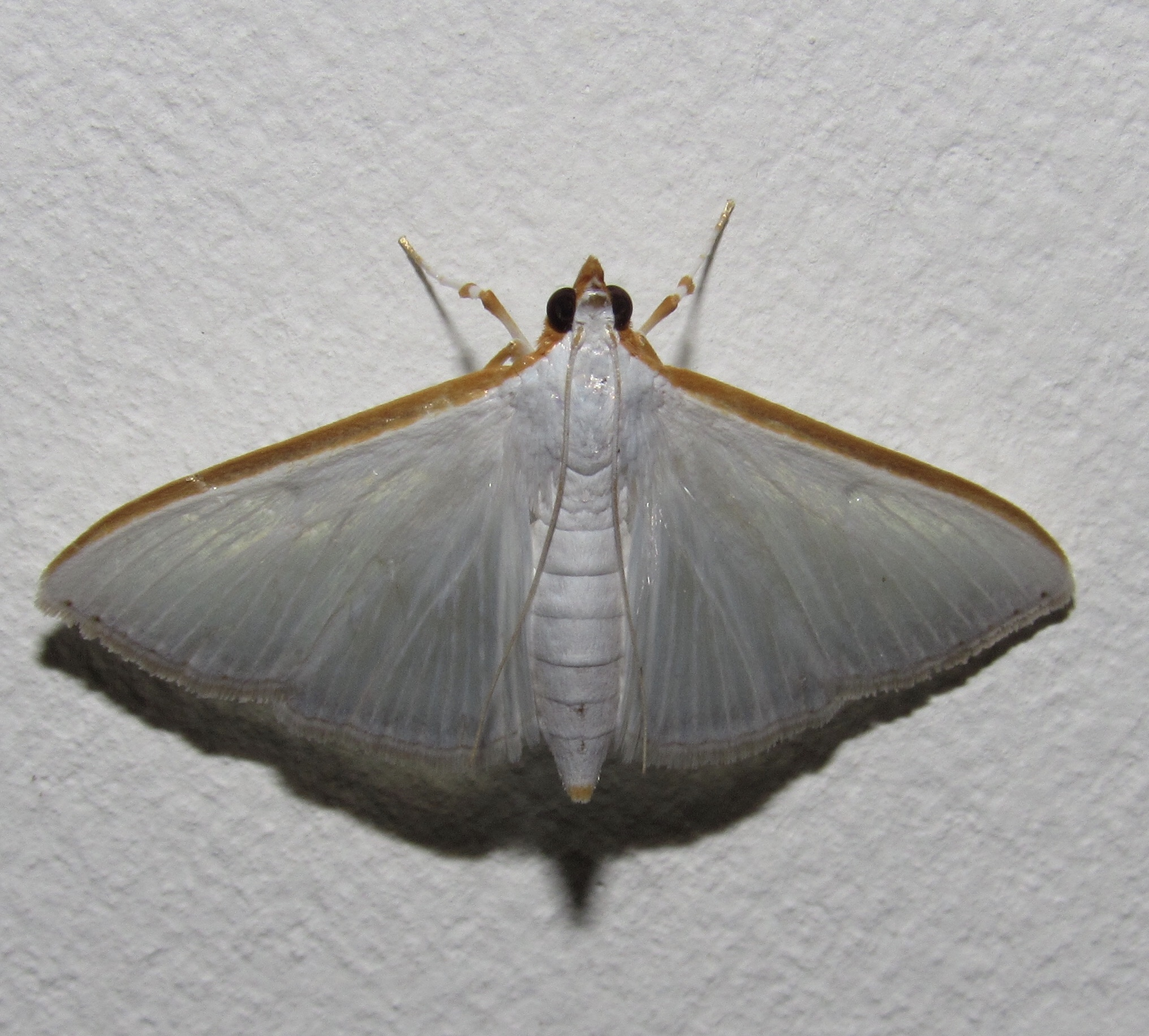

Scientific classification
- Kingdom: Animalia
- Phylum: Arthropoda
- Clade: Pancrustacea
- Class: Insecta
- Order: Lepidoptera
- Family: Crambidae
- Genus: Diaphania
- Species: D. costata

Binomial name
- Diaphania costata (Fabricius, 1775)

Synonyms
- Phalaena costata Fabricius, 1775; Margarodes aurocostalis Guenée, 1854; Margarodes imitalis Geunee, 1854; Stemorrhages costata (Fabricius, 1794)

= Diaphania costata =

Species of moth

Diaphania costata, the orange-shouldered sherbet moth or erroneously the white palpita moth, is a moth of the family Crambidae. The species was first described by Fabricius in 1775. It is frequently misidentified but may be widely dispersed in the Americas, perhaps only more recently in the southeastern US, with early records from Texas and Louisiana, possibly having been introduced accidentally, then range spreading in association with ornamental plants.

It is a small moth (less than 20 mm wingspan) with translucent white wings, and a gold line on the front edge of the forewing.
