= Diaphania guenealis =

Scientific classification
- Kingdom: Animalia
- Phylum: Arthropoda
- Class: Insecta
- Order: Lepidoptera
- Family: Crambidae
- Genus: Diaphania
- Species: D. guenealis

Binomial name
- Diaphania guenealis (Snellen, 1875)

Synonyms
- Phakellura guenealis Snellen, 1875

Species of moth

Diaphania guenealis is a moth in the family Crambidae. It was described by Snellen in 1875. It is found in Colombia, Venezuela, Ecuador, Peru, Belize and Mexico.

The length of the forewings is 15.5–17 mm for males and 14–16 mm for females.
