= Diaphania euryzonalis =

Scientific classification
- Kingdom: Animalia
- Phylum: Arthropoda
- Class: Insecta
- Order: Lepidoptera
- Family: Crambidae
- Genus: Diaphania
- Species: D. euryzonalis

Binomial name
- Diaphania euryzonalis (Hampson, 1912)

Synonyms
- Glyphodes euryzonalis Hampson, 1912

Species of moth

Diaphania euryzonalis is a moth in the family Crambidae. It was described by George Hampson in 1912. It is found in Colombia, Ecuador, Venezuela, Peru, Bolivia, Brazil, Costa Rica and Mexico. The habitat consists of cloud forests.

The length of the forewings is 14–18 mm.
