= Diaphania hemicitralis =

Scientific classification
- Kingdom: Animalia
- Phylum: Arthropoda
- Class: Insecta
- Order: Lepidoptera
- Family: Crambidae
- Genus: Diaphania
- Species: D. hemicitralis

Binomial name
- Diaphania hemicitralis (Hampson, 1912)

Synonyms
- Glyphodes hemicitralis Hampson, 1912; Glyphodes buscki Dyar, 1914

Species of moth

Diaphania hemicitralis is a moth in the family Crambidae. It was described by George Hampson in 1912. It is found in Guyana and Panama.
