= Diaphania impunctalis =

Scientific classification
- Domain: Eukaryota
- Kingdom: Animalia
- Phylum: Arthropoda
- Class: Insecta
- Order: Lepidoptera
- Family: Crambidae
- Genus: Diaphania
- Species: D. impunctalis

Binomial name
- Diaphania impunctalis (Dognin, 1905)

Synonyms
- Glyphodes impunctalis Dognin, 1905

Species of moth

Diaphania impunctalis is a moth in the family Crambidae. It was described by Paul Dognin in 1905. It is found in Colombia.
