= Diaphania albifascialis =

Scientific classification
- Kingdom: Animalia
- Phylum: Arthropoda
- Class: Insecta
- Order: Lepidoptera
- Family: Crambidae
- Genus: Diaphania
- Species: D. albifascialis

Binomial name
- Diaphania albifascialis (Hampson, 1912)

Synonyms
- Glyphodes albifascialis Hampson, 1912; Diaphania albofascialis Klima, 1939

Species of moth

Diaphania albifascialis is a moth in the family Crambidae. It was described by George Hampson in 1912. It is found in Cuba.
