= Diaphania fuligalis =

Scientific classification
- Domain: Eukaryota
- Kingdom: Animalia
- Phylum: Arthropoda
- Class: Insecta
- Order: Lepidoptera
- Family: Crambidae
- Genus: Diaphania
- Species: D. fuligalis

Binomial name
- Diaphania fuligalis (Schaus, 1912)

Synonyms
- Glyphodes fuligalis Schaus, 1912

Species of moth

Diaphania fuligalis is a moth in the family Crambidae. It was described by Schaus in 1912. It is found in Costa Rica.
