= Diaphania satanalis =

Scientific classification
- Kingdom: Animalia
- Phylum: Arthropoda
- Class: Insecta
- Order: Lepidoptera
- Family: Crambidae
- Genus: Diaphania
- Species: D. satanalis

Binomial name
- Diaphania satanalis (Snellen, 1875)

Synonyms
- Phakellura satanalis Snellen, 1875

Species of moth

Diaphania satanalis is a moth in the family Crambidae. It is found in Colombia.
