= Diaphania lualis =

Scientific classification
- Domain: Eukaryota
- Kingdom: Animalia
- Phylum: Arthropoda
- Class: Insecta
- Order: Lepidoptera
- Family: Crambidae
- Genus: Diaphania
- Species: D. lualis

Binomial name
- Diaphania lualis (Herrich-Schäffer, 1871)

Synonyms
- Botys lualis Herrich-Schäffer, 1871

Species of moth

Diaphania lualis is a moth in the family Crambidae. It was described by Gottlieb August Wilhelm Herrich-Schäffer in 1871. It is found in Cuba, Mexico, southern Texas and Florida.

The wingspan is about 19 mm. Adults are on wing from September to January and from May to June in Florida.
