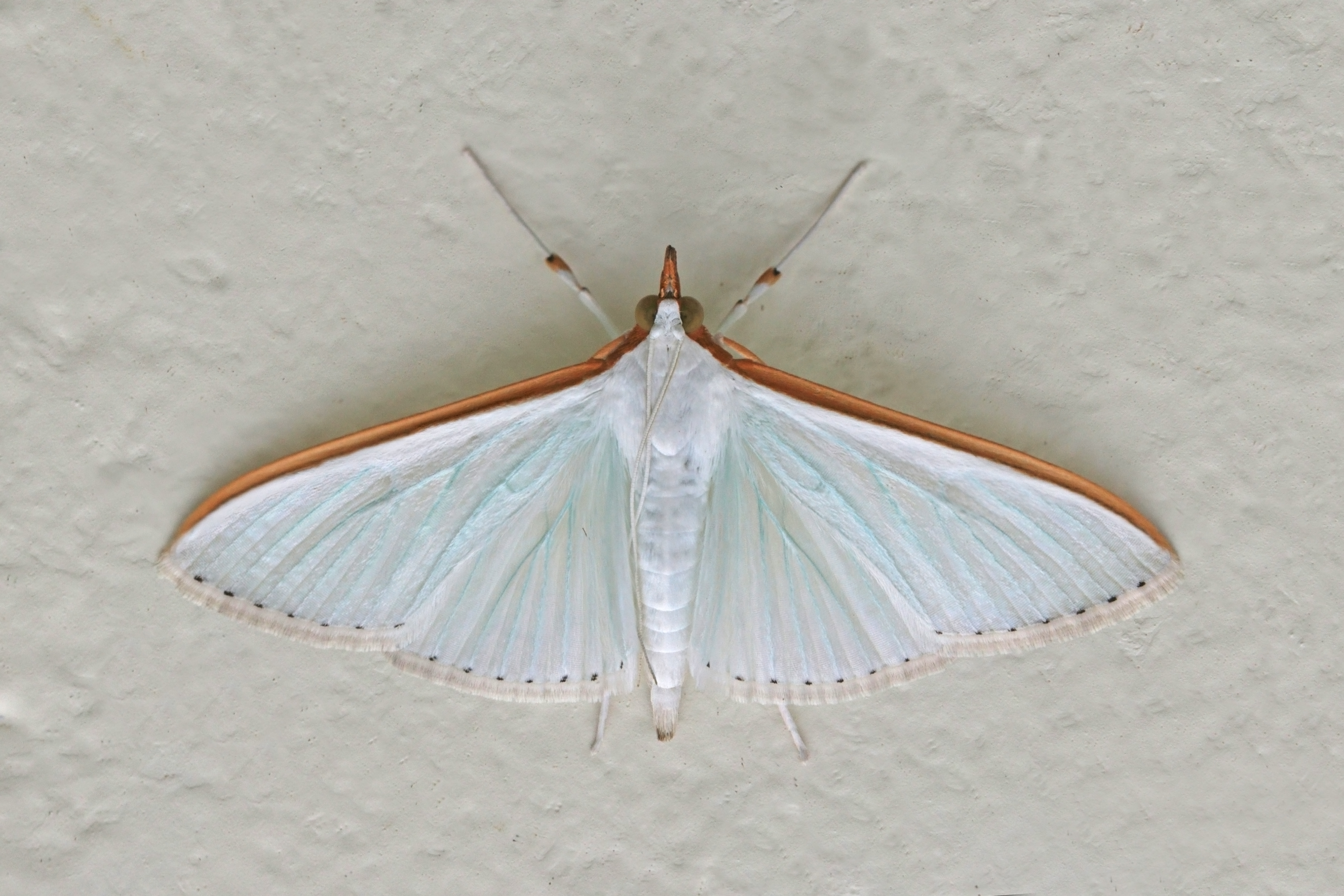
- Crambid snout moth Diaphania glauculalis Mount Totumas cloud forest, Panama

Scientific classification
- Kingdom: Animalia
- Phylum: Arthropoda
- Class: Insecta
- Order: Lepidoptera
- Family: Crambidae
- Tribe: Margaroniini
- Genus: Diaphania; Hübner, 1818

Synonyms
- Diaphania Stephens, 1829; Eudioptis Hübner, 1823; Phakellura Guilding, 1830; Phacellura J. L. R. Agassiz, 1847; Sestia Snellen, 1875

= Diaphania =

Genus of moths

Diaphania is a genus of moths of the family Crambidae.

== Species ==
- Diaphania adelalis (Dognin, 1905)
- Diaphania albianalis (Hampson, 1918)
- Diaphania albicincta (Hampson, 1899)
- Diaphania albifascialis (Hampson, 1912)
- Diaphania andringitralis Viette, 1960
- Diaphania antillia Munroe, 1960
- Diaphania argealis (Walker, 1859)
- Diaphania arguta (Lederer, 1863)
- Diaphania aroalis (Schaus, 1920)
- Diaphania atomosalis (Dognin, 1908)
- Diaphania attigua (E. Hering, 1906)
- Diaphania auricollis (Snellen, 1875)
- Diaphania aurogrisealis (Hampson, 1912)
- Diaphania beckeri Clavijo & Munroe, 1996
- Diaphania brevilinealis (Schaus, 1920)
- Diaphania brunneacollis (Schaus, 1920)
- Diaphania busccalis (Schaus, 1920)
- Diaphania cachinalis (Strand, 1920)
- Diaphania circumfumata (Dognin, 1905)
- Diaphania clavata (Hampson, 1912)
- Diaphania columbiana (Hampson, 1899)
- Diaphania contactalis (Dognin, 1903)
- Diaphania costaricalis (Schaus, 1912)
- Diaphania costata (Fabricius, 1775)
- Diaphania culminalis (Schaus, 1924)
- Diaphania damalis (Druce, 1895)
- Diaphania dohrni (Hampson, 1899)
- Diaphania elegans (Möschler, 1890)
- Diaphania equicincta (Hampson, 1912)
- Diaphania esmeralda (Hampson, 1899)
- Diaphania eumeusalis (Walker, 1859)
- Diaphania euryzonalis (Hampson, 1912)
- Diaphania exclusalis (Walker, 1865)
- Diaphania fenestralis Amsel, 1956
- Diaphania flavicaput (Hampson, 1899)
- Diaphania fuligalis (Schaus, 1912)
- Diaphania fumosalis (Guenée, 1854)
- Diaphania fuscicaudalis (Möschler, 1881)
- Diaphania fuscicollis (Snellen, 1875)
- Diaphania gilvidorsis (E. Hering, 1906)
- Diaphania glauculalis (Guenée, 1854)
- Diaphania grisealis (Maassen, 1890)
- Diaphania guatemalalis (Schaus, 1920)
- Diaphania guenealis (Snellen, 1875)
- Diaphania hemicitralis (Hampson, 1912)
- Diaphania holophaealis Hampson, 1900
- Diaphania holophoenica (Hampson, 1912)
- Diaphania hyalinata Linnaeus, 1767
- Diaphania hypheusalis (Walker, 1859)
- Diaphania immaculalis (Guenée, 1854)
- Diaphania impunctalis (Dognin, 1905)
- Diaphania indica (Saunders, 1851)
- Diaphania infernalis (Möschler, 1890)
- Diaphania infimalis (Guenée, 1854)
- Diaphania innotata (Druce, 1895)
- Diaphania interpositalis (Hampson, 1912)
- Diaphania latilimbalis (Guenée, 1854)
- Diaphania limitalis (Dognin, 1905)
- Diaphania lualis (Herrich-Schäffer, 1871)
- Diaphania lucidalis (Hübner, 1823)
- Diaphania magdalenae (Hampson, 1899)
- Diaphania marinata (Fabricius, 1784)
- Diaphania meridialis Yamanaka, 1972
- Diaphania mirabilis (Druce, 1902)
- Diaphania monothyralis (Hampson, 1918)
- Diaphania morosalis (Schaus, 1920)
- Diaphania negatalis (Walker, 1859)
- Diaphania nigricilialis (Schaus, 1912)
- Diaphania nitidalis (Stoll in Cramer & Stoll, 1781)
- Diaphania novicialis (Schaus, 1912)
- Diaphania ochrivitralis (Hampson, 1899)
- Diaphania oeditornalis (Hampson, 1912)
- Diaphania olealis (C. Felder, R. Felder & Rogenhofer, 1875)
- Diaphania oleosalis (Snellen, 1875)
- Diaphania oriolalis Viette, 1958
- Diaphania orthozonalis (Hampson, 1912)
- Diaphania phlebitis (Hampson, 1912)
- Diaphania plumbidorsalis (Guenée, 1854)
- Diaphania praxialis (Druce, 1895)
- Diaphania punctilinealis (Hampson, 1918)
- Diaphania purpurea (Hampson, 1912)
- Diaphania pyloalis (Hampson, 1859)
- Diaphania reductalis (Guenée, 1854)
- Diaphania sahlkei (E. Hering, 1906)
- Diaphania satanalis (Snellen, 1875)
- Diaphania semaphoralis (Dognin, 1903)
- Diaphania spurcalis (Snellen, 1875)
- Diaphania subterminalis (Hampson, 1912)
- Diaphania subtilalis Amsel, 1956
- Diaphania superalis (Guenée, 1854)
- Diaphania taenialis (Dognin, 1905)
- Diaphania terminalis (Maassen, 1890)
- Diaphania translucidalis (Guenée, 1854)
- Diaphania yurakyana Vila, Piñas & Clavijo, 2004

== Former species ==
- Diaphania eurytornalis (Hampson, 1912)
- Diaphania modialis (Dyar, 1912)
- Diaphania niveocilia (Hampson, 1899)
