= Diaphania columbiana =

Scientific classification
- Kingdom: Animalia
- Phylum: Arthropoda
- Class: Insecta
- Order: Lepidoptera
- Family: Crambidae
- Genus: Diaphania
- Species: D. columbiana

Binomial name
- Diaphania columbiana (Hampson, 1899)

Synonyms
- Glyphodes columbiana Hampson, 1899

Species of moth

Diaphania columbiana is a moth in the family Crambidae. It was described by George Hampson in 1899. It is found in Guatemala, Colombia, Ecuador, Peru, Bolivia and Paraguay.

The length of the forewings is 13–15 mm for males and 14 mm for females.
