= Diaphania semaphoralis =

Scientific classification
- Domain: Eukaryota
- Kingdom: Animalia
- Phylum: Arthropoda
- Class: Insecta
- Order: Lepidoptera
- Family: Crambidae
- Genus: Diaphania
- Species: D. semaphoralis

Binomial name
- Diaphania semaphoralis (Dognin, 1903)

Synonyms
- Glyphodes semaphoralis Dognin, 1903

Species of moth

Diaphania semaphoralis is a moth in the family Crambidae. It was described by Paul Dognin in 1903. It is found in Costa Rica, Colombia, Bolivia, French Guiana and Peru.

The length of the forewings is 13–16 mm and 15 mm for females.
