= Diaphania yurakyana =

Scientific classification
- Domain: Eukaryota
- Kingdom: Animalia
- Phylum: Arthropoda
- Class: Insecta
- Order: Lepidoptera
- Family: Crambidae
- Genus: Diaphania
- Species: D. yurakyana

Binomial name
- Diaphania yurakyana Vila, Piñas & Clavijo, 2004

Species of moth

Diaphania yurakyana is a moth in the family Crambidae. It is found in Ecuador.
