= Diaphania holophoenica =

Scientific classification
- Kingdom: Animalia
- Phylum: Arthropoda
- Class: Insecta
- Order: Lepidoptera
- Family: Crambidae
- Genus: Diaphania
- Species: D. holophoenica

Binomial name
- Diaphania holophoenica (Hampson, 1912)

Synonyms
- Glyphodes holophoenica Hampson, 1912

Species of moth

Diaphania holophoenica is a moth in the family Crambidae. It was described by George Hampson in 1912. It is found in Colombia.
