= Diaphania infimalis =

Scientific classification
- Domain: Eukaryota
- Kingdom: Animalia
- Phylum: Arthropoda
- Class: Insecta
- Order: Lepidoptera
- Family: Crambidae
- Genus: Diaphania
- Species: D. infimalis

Binomial name
- Diaphania infimalis (Guenée, 1854)

Synonyms
- Phakellura infimalis Guenée, 1854; Glyphodes infimalis modialis Dyar, 1912; Diaphania modialis

Species of moth

Diaphania infimalis is a moth in the family Crambidae. It was first described by Achille Guenée in 1854. It is found in Florida, Mexico, Guatemala, Belize, the Bahamas, Cuba, Jamaica, Panama, Venezuela and Bolivia.

The length of the forewings is 9–10 mm for males and 9–11 mm for females.

The larvae have been recorded feeding on Melothria grendula.
