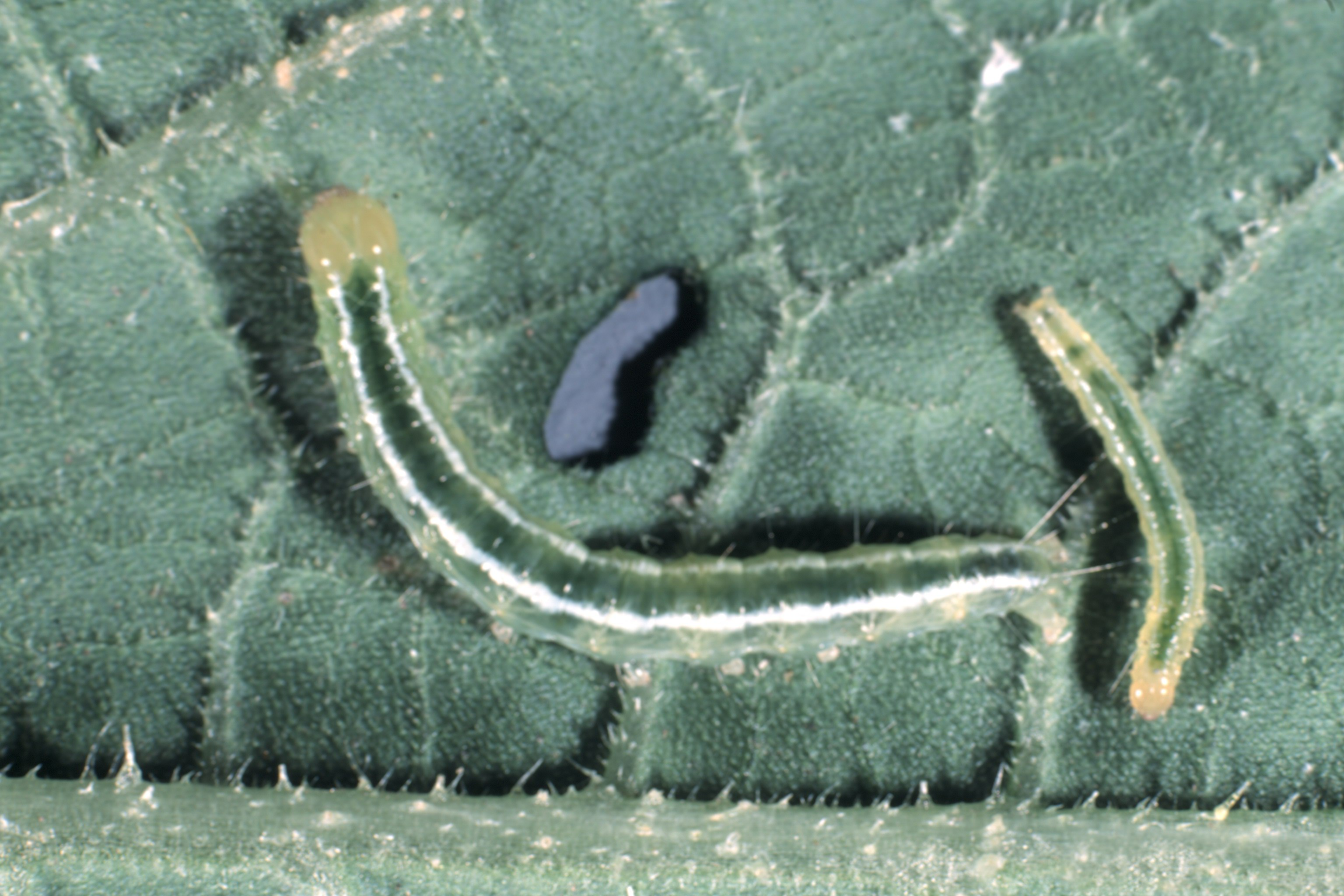
- Larva

Scientific classification
- Kingdom: Animalia
- Phylum: Arthropoda
- Class: Insecta
- Order: Lepidoptera
- Family: Crambidae
- Genus: Diaphania
- Species: D. hyalinata

Binomial name
- Diaphania hyalinata (Linnaeus, 1767)

Synonyms
- Phalaena Geometra hyalina; Phakellura hyalinatalis Guenée, 1854; Phalaena Pyralis marginalis Stoll in Cramer & Stoll, 1781; Pyralis lucernalis Hübner, 1796; Pyralis zapillitalis Weyenbergh, 1873; Pyralis sapillitalis Weyenbergh, 1873; Glyphodes niveocilia Hampson, 1898

= Diaphania hyalinata =

Melonworm moth

Species of insect

Diaphania hyalinata, the melonworm moth, is a moth of the family Crambidae. It is found in eastern North America, south to Central and South America, including Suriname and the Caribbean.

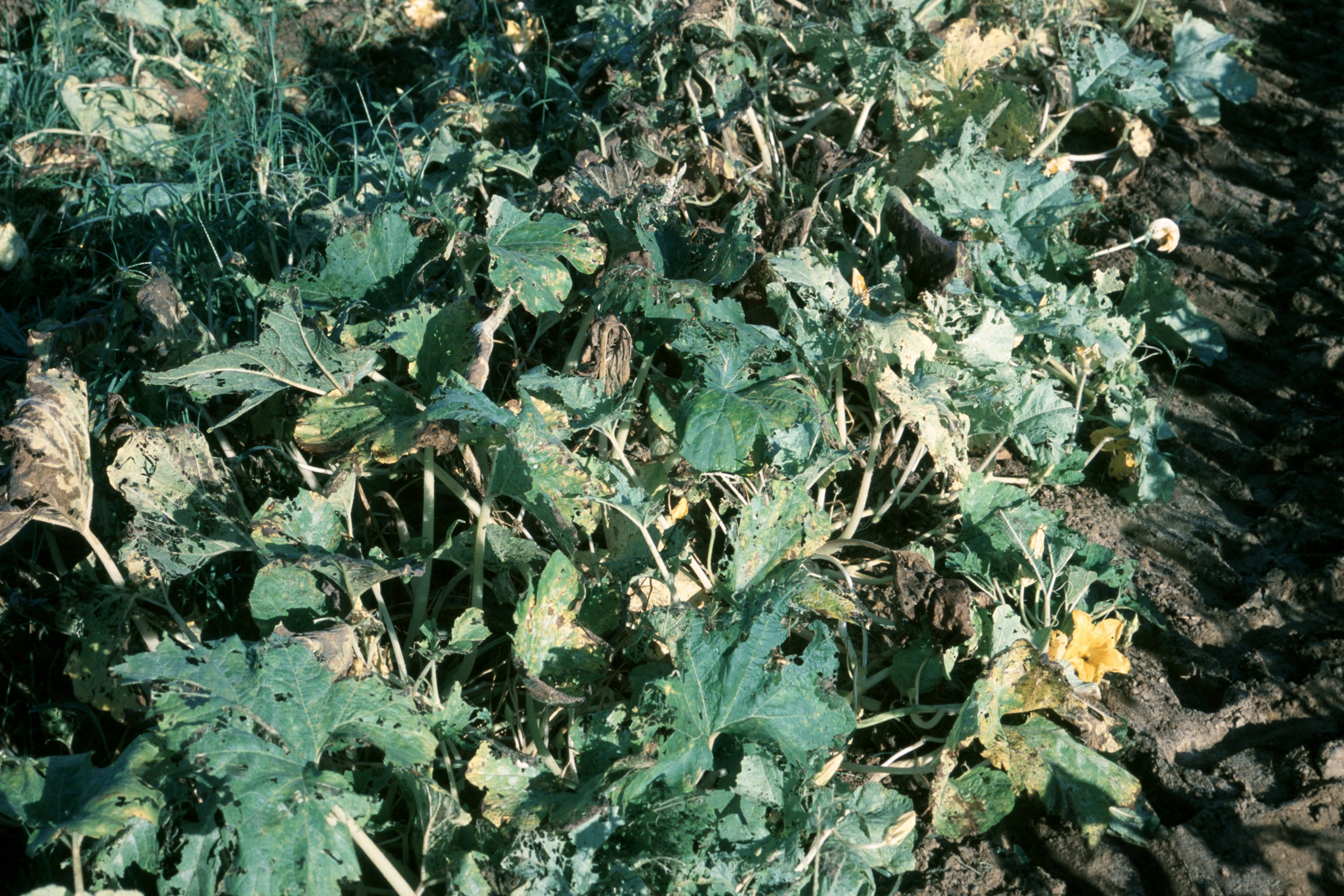
Damage

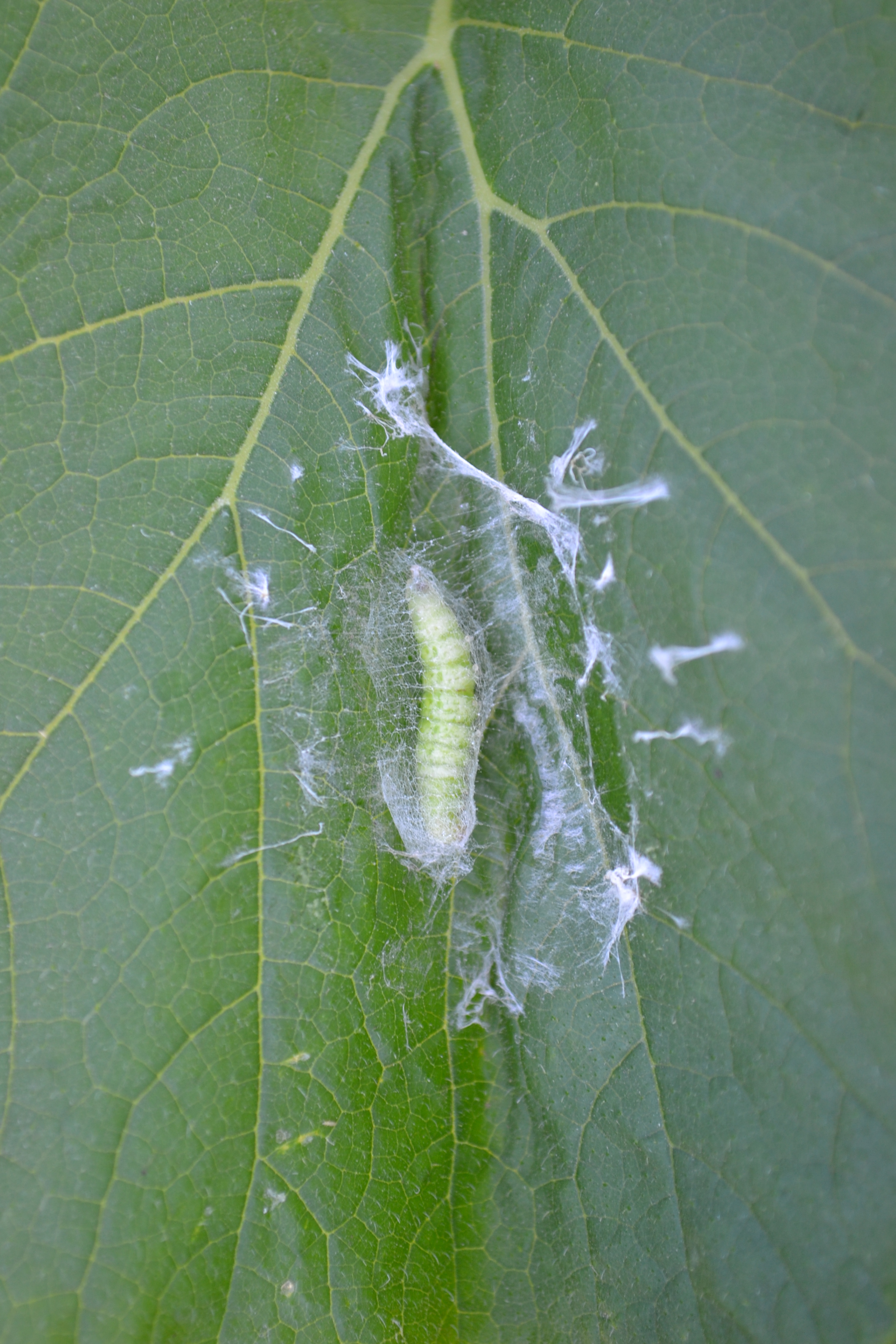
Pupa of Diaphania hyalinata on a squash leaf

The wingspan is 27–30 mm. Adults are on wing from October to November in the northern part of the range and all year round in multiple generations in Florida and further south.
