= Guglielmi =

Guglielmi may refer to

- Guglielmi (surname)
- Guglielmi castle in Italy
- Guglielmi detachable coil, a medical device used in the treatment of brain aneurysms
- Beebea guglielmi, a moth
