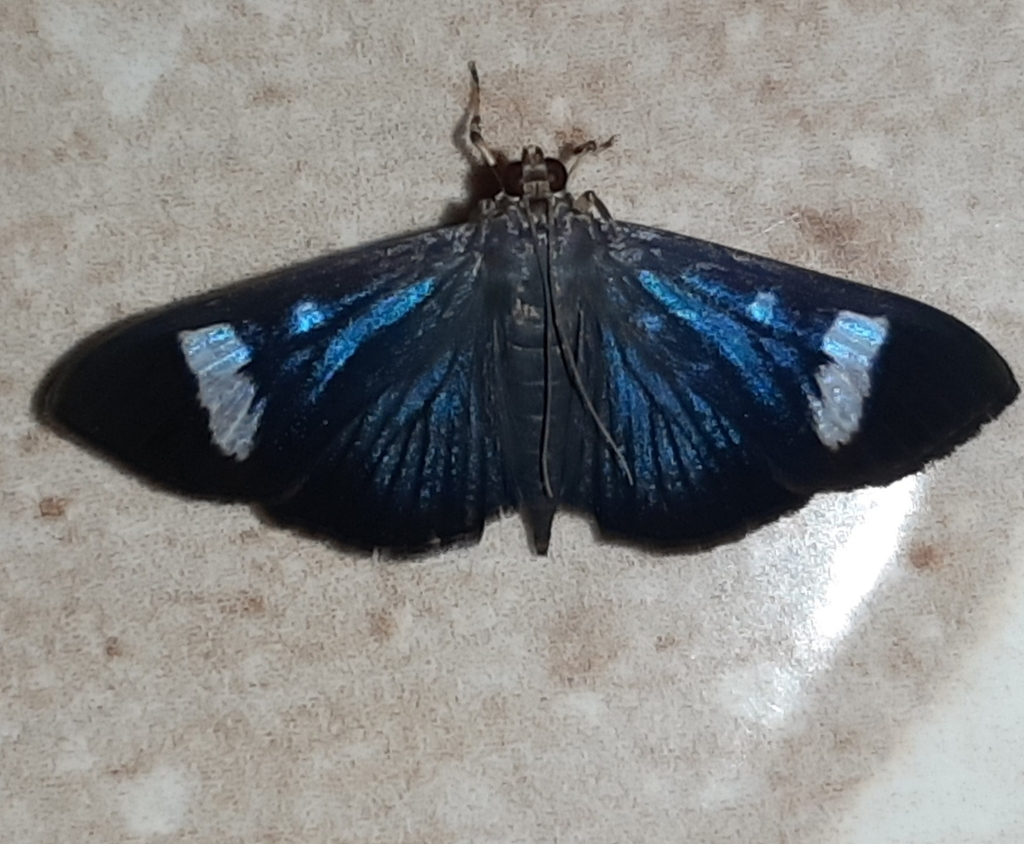
- Erilusa leucoplagalis

Scientific classification
- Domain: Eukaryota
- Kingdom: Animalia
- Phylum: Arthropoda
- Class: Insecta
- Order: Lepidoptera
- Family: Crambidae
- Tribe: Asciodini
- Genus: Erilusa; Walker, 1866

= Erilusa =

Genus of moths

Erilusa is a genus of moths of the family Crambidae.

== Species ==
- Erilusa croceipes C. Felder, R. Felder & Rogenhofer, 1875
- Erilusa leucoplagalis (Hampson, 1899)
- Erilusa secta

== Former species ==
- Erilusa nitealis C. Felder, R. Felder & Rogenhofer, 1875
