= Guglielmini =

Guglielmini is an Italian surname. Notable people with the surname include:

- Domenico Guglielmini (1655–1710), Italian mathematician, chemist, and physician
- Giovanni Battista Guglielmini (1763–1817), Italian physicist

== See also ==
- Guglielmi (surname)
