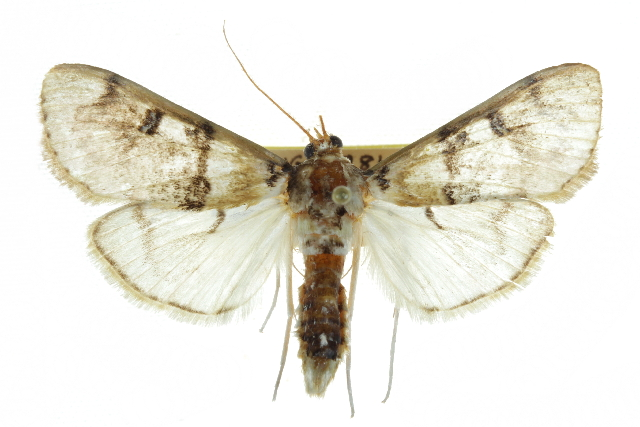

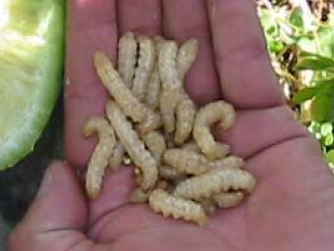
- Adult (top) and larva (bottom)

Scientific classification
- Kingdom: Animalia
- Phylum: Arthropoda
- Clade: Pancrustacea
- Class: Insecta
- Order: Lepidoptera
- Family: Crambidae
- Genus: Laniifera
- Species: L. cyclades

Binomial name
- Laniifera cyclades (Druce, 1895)

= Laniifera cyclades =

Species of moth

Laniifera cyclades is a species of snout moth in the family Crambidae. It was first described by Herbert Druce in 1895, based on three imagines collected in Mexico City and near Durango City, Mexico. The species is also found in the states of Arizona and Texas in the United States.

== Description ==
The wingspan is about 40 mm. The forewings are fawn, but black at the base and clouded with blackish gray from the middle almost to the outer margin, with a narrow waved black line, edged with grayish white on the inner side, crossing the wing before the middle. There is a submarginal zigzag grayish-black line, edged with white on the outer side, extending from the costal margin near the apex to the inner margin near the anal angle, and a round white spot in the cell and an elongate spot at the end of it, both edged with black. The hindwings are pearly white, the marginal line fawn. The flight time of the adults is from July to September.

The caterpillars feed on Opuntia (prickly pear cactuses) and are considered a pest.
