= Bicilia olivia =

Scientific classification
- Kingdom: Animalia
- Phylum: Arthropoda
- Class: Insecta
- Order: Lepidoptera
- Family: Crambidae
- Genus: Bicilia
- Species: B. olivia

Binomial name
- Bicilia olivia (Butler, 1878)

Synonyms
- Botys olivia Butler, 1878

Species of moth

Bicilia olivia is a species of moth in the family Crambidae. It was described by Arthur Gardiner Butler in 1878. It is found on Jamaica.
