= Ceratocilia falsalis =

Scientific classification
- Kingdom: Animalia
- Phylum: Arthropoda
- Class: Insecta
- Order: Lepidoptera
- Family: Crambidae
- Genus: Ceratocilia
- Species: C. falsalis

Binomial name
- Ceratocilia falsalis (Schaus, 1912)

Synonyms
- Sylepta falsalis Schaus, 1912

Species of moth

Ceratocilia falsalis is a species of moth in the family Crambidae. It was first described by Schaus in 1912. It is found in Costa Rica.
