= Ceratoclasis delimitalis =

Scientific classification
- Kingdom: Animalia
- Phylum: Arthropoda
- Class: Insecta
- Order: Lepidoptera
- Family: Crambidae
- Genus: Ceratoclasis
- Species: C. delimitalis

Binomial name
- Ceratoclasis delimitalis (Guenée, 1854)

Synonyms
- Botys delimitalis Guenée, 1854

Species of moth

Ceratoclasis delimitalis is a species of moth in the family Crambidae. It was first described by Achille Guenée in 1854. It is found in the West Indies (including Cuba, Hispaniola and Puerto Rico) and Brazil.
