= Loxomorpha cambogialis =

Scientific classification
- Kingdom: Animalia
- Phylum: Arthropoda
- Class: Insecta
- Order: Lepidoptera
- Family: Crambidae
- Genus: Loxomorpha
- Species: L. cambogialis

Binomial name
- Loxomorpha cambogialis (Guenée, 1854)

Synonyms
- Botys cambogialis Guenée, 1854; Botys citrinalis Möschler, 1890; Botys lucilla Butler, 1878

Species of moth

Loxomorpha cambogialis is a species of moth in the family Crambidae. It was first described by Achille Guenée in 1854. It is found in Brazil, Venezuela, Jamaica, Puerto Rico Cuba and Florida.

The wingspan is about 18 mm. Adults are on wing from June to September.
