= Laniipriva =

Laniipriva antobliqua

Scientific classification
- Kingdom: Animalia
- Phylum: Arthropoda
- Class: Insecta
- Order: Lepidoptera
- Family: Crambidae
- Tribe: Asciodini
- Genus: Laniipriva; Munroe, 1976
- Species: L. antobliqua

Binomial name
- Laniipriva antobliqua Munroe, 1976]

Genus of moths

Laniipriva is a genus of moths in the family Crambidae described by Eugene G. Munroe in 1976. It is monotypic, being represented by the single species, Laniipriva antobliqua which is found in Venezuela.
