= Loxomorpha =

Scientific classification
- Kingdom: Animalia
- Phylum: Arthropoda
- Class: Insecta
- Order: Lepidoptera
- Family: Crambidae
- Tribe: Asciodini
- Genus: Loxomorpha; Amsel, 1956

Synonyms
- Chrysobotys Munroe, 1956

Genus of moths

Loxomorpha is a genus of moths of the family Crambidae.

== Species ==
- Loxomorpha amseli Munroe, 1995
- Loxomorpha cambogialis (Guenée, 1854)
- Loxomorpha flavidissimalis Grote, 1877
- Loxomorpha pulchellalis (Dyar, 1922)
