= Bicilia =

Scientific classification
- Kingdom: Animalia
- Phylum: Arthropoda
- Class: Insecta
- Order: Lepidoptera
- Family: Crambidae
- Tribe: Asciodini
- Genus: Bicilia; Amsel, 1956

Genus of moths

Bicilia is a genus of moths of the family Crambidae.

== Species ==
- Bicilia iarchasalis (Walker, 1859)
- Bicilia lentistrialis (Dognin, 1906)
- Bicilia olivia (Butler, 1878)
- Bicilia persinualis (Hampson, 1899)
