= Sathria =

Scientific classification
- Kingdom: Animalia
- Phylum: Arthropoda
- Clade: Pancrustacea
- Class: Insecta
- Order: Lepidoptera
- Family: Crambidae
- Tribe: Asciodini
- Genus: Sathria; Lederer, 1863

Genus of moths

Sathria is a genus of moths of the family Crambidae described by Julius Lederer in 1863.

== Species ==
- Sathria internitalis (Guenée, 1854)
- Sathria onophasalis (Walker, 1859)
- Sathria simmialis (Walker, 1859)
