= Ceratoclasis discodontalis =

Scientific classification
- Kingdom: Animalia
- Phylum: Arthropoda
- Class: Insecta
- Order: Lepidoptera
- Family: Crambidae
- Genus: Ceratoclasis
- Species: C. discodontalis

Binomial name
- Ceratoclasis discodontalis (Hampson, 1899)

Synonyms
- Pilocrocis discodontalis Hampson, 1899; Pilocrocis tortuosalis Schaus, 1912

Species of moth

Ceratoclasis discodontalis is a species of moth in the family Crambidae. It was first described by George Hampson in 1899. It is found in Costa Rica and Venezuela.

== Description ==
The wingspan is about 28 mm. The forewings are greyish brown with a yellowish tinge. The hindwings are ochreous, suffused with brown.
