= Ceratoclasis metatalis =

Scientific classification
- Kingdom: Animalia
- Phylum: Arthropoda
- Class: Insecta
- Order: Lepidoptera
- Family: Crambidae
- Genus: Ceratoclasis
- Species: C. metatalis

Binomial name
- Ceratoclasis metatalis Möschler, 1890

Synonyms
- Pilocrocis metatalis; Pilocrocis metalalis Hampson, 1899

Species of moth

Ceratoclasis metatalis is a species of moth in the family Crambidae. It was first described by Heinrich Benno Möschler in 1890. It is found in Puerto Rico.
