= Ceratoclasis imbrexalis =

Scientific classification
- Kingdom: Animalia
- Phylum: Arthropoda
- Class: Insecta
- Order: Lepidoptera
- Family: Crambidae
- Genus: Ceratoclasis
- Species: C. imbrexalis

Binomial name
- Ceratoclasis imbrexalis (Walker, 1859)

Synonyms
- Botys imbrexalis Walker, 1859

Species of moth

Ceratoclasis imbrexalis is a species of moth in the family Crambidae. It was first described by Francis Walker in 1859. It is found in the state of Rio de Janeiro, Brazil.
