= Ceratoclasis avilalis =

Scientific classification
- Kingdom: Animalia
- Phylum: Arthropoda
- Class: Insecta
- Order: Lepidoptera
- Family: Crambidae
- Genus: Ceratoclasis
- Species: C. avilalis

Binomial name
- Ceratoclasis avilalis Amsel, 1956

Species of moth

Ceratoclasis avilalis is a species of moth in the family Crambidae. It was first described by Hans Georg Amsel in 1956. It is found in Venezuela.
