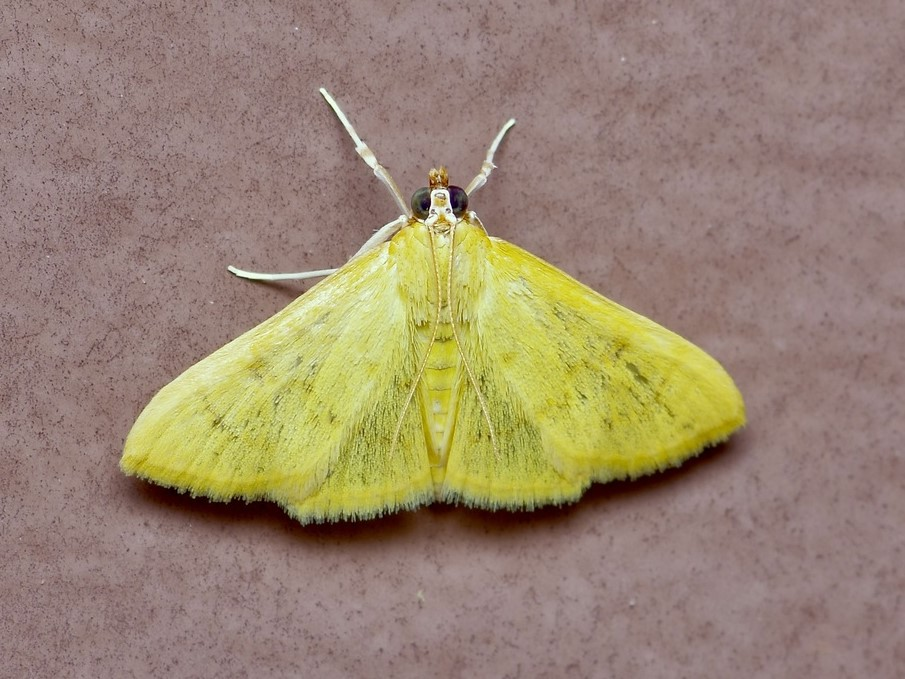

Scientific classification
- Kingdom: Animalia
- Phylum: Arthropoda
- Clade: Pancrustacea
- Class: Insecta
- Order: Lepidoptera
- Family: Crambidae
- Genus: Loxomorpha
- Species: L. flavidissimalis

Binomial name
- Loxomorpha flavidissimalis Grote, 1877

= Loxomorpha flavidissimalis =

Species of moth

Loxomorpha flavidissimalis is a species of moth in the family Crambidae. The species' common name is the cactus webworm. It was first described by Augustus Radcliffe Grote in 1877. It is found in the United States (Texas, Florida, North Carolina, West Virginia and Puerto Rico), Mexico and has also been recorded in Australia.

In the United States, adults have been recorded on wing from May to July and in September.

The larvae feed on Opuntia species. They are yellowish white and reach a length of about 11 mm when full-grown.
