= Ceratoclasis sulpitialis =

Scientific classification
- Kingdom: Animalia
- Phylum: Arthropoda
- Class: Insecta
- Order: Lepidoptera
- Family: Crambidae
- Genus: Ceratoclasis
- Species: C. sulpitialis

Binomial name
- Ceratoclasis sulpitialis C. Swinhoe, 1906

Species of moth

Ceratoclasis sulpitialis is a species of moth in the family Crambidae. It was first described by Charles Swinhoe in 1906. It is found on Sumatra.
