= Sathria onophasalis =

Scientific classification
- Kingdom: Animalia
- Phylum: Arthropoda
- Class: Insecta
- Order: Lepidoptera
- Family: Crambidae
- Genus: Sathria
- Species: S. onophasalis

Binomial name
- Sathria onophasalis (Walker, 1859)

Synonyms
- Botys onophasalis Walker, 1859; Syllepte onophasalis; Botys thisoalis Walker, 1859; Pyralis gryllusalis Walker, 1859

Species of moth

Sathria onophasalis is a species of moth in the family Crambidae. It is found on the Antilles, including Puerto Rico and the Virgin Islands.
