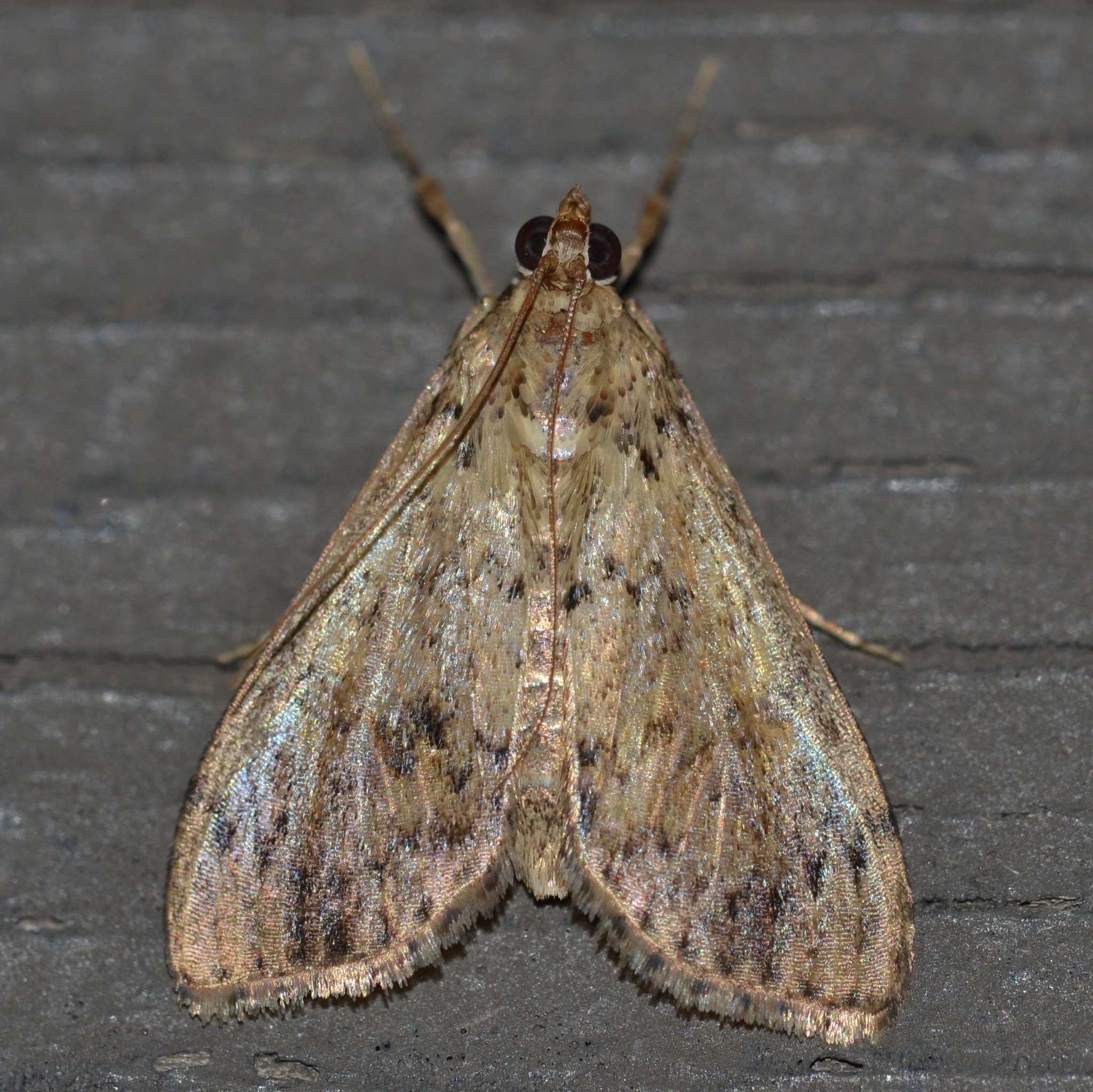
- Asciodes quietalis

Scientific classification
- Kingdom: Animalia
- Phylum: Arthropoda
- Clade: Pancrustacea
- Class: Insecta
- Order: Lepidoptera
- Family: Crambidae
- Subfamily: Spilomelinae
- Tribe: Asciodini
- Genus: Asciodes; Guenée, 1854

= Asciodes =

Genus of moths

Asciodes is a genus of snout moths in the subfamily Spilomelinae of the family Crambidae. The genus was erected by Achille Guenée in 1854 with Asciodes gordialis as type species.

== Distribution and habitat ==
The five species are distributed from the southern United States (California, Arizona, Texas, Florida, South Carolina) and Mexico over the Caribbean (Cuba, Jamaica, Dominican Republic, Puerto Rico, Lesser Antilles) to the tropical and subtropical South America (Argentina, Brazil, Ecuador).

== Behaviour and ecology ==
Like other Asciodini, caterpillars of Asciodes commonly feed on Caryophyllales. So far, only the food plants of Asciodes gordialis larvae have been recorded, which are mostly Bougainvillea, Mirabilis and Pisonia (all in the Nyctaginaceae family), but also non-Caryophyllales like Citrus (Rutaceae) and Manihot esculenta (Euphorbiaceae).

== Species ==
- Asciodes denticulinea (Schaus, 1940)
- Asciodes gordialis Guenée, 1854
- Asciodes quietalis (Walker, 1859)
- Asciodes scopulalis Guenée, 1854
- Asciodes titubalis Möschler, 1890
