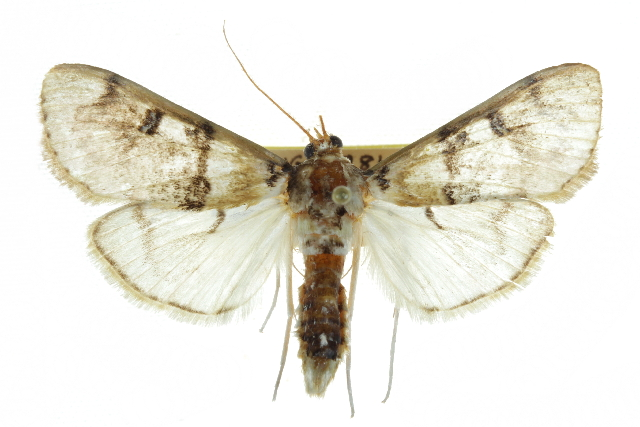
- Laniifera cyclades

Scientific classification
- Kingdom: Animalia
- Phylum: Arthropoda
- Clade: Pancrustacea
- Class: Insecta
- Order: Lepidoptera
- Family: Crambidae
- Tribe: Asciodini
- Genus: Laniifera; Hampson, 1899

= Laniifera =

Genus of moths

Laniifera is a genus of snout moths in the family Crambidae. The genus was erected by George Hampson in 1899 with Pachynoa cyclades Druce, 1895 as type species.

The caterpillars of Laniifera cyclades feed on Opuntia (prickly pear cactuses) and are considered a pest of commercially grown Opuntia species.

The genus with its two species is distributed in Mexico, the southern United States (Arizona, Texas) and the Dominican Republic.

== Species ==
- Laniifera cyclades (Druce, 1895)
- Laniifera rawlinsi Hayden, 2020
