= Maracayia percludalis =

Scientific classification
- Kingdom: Animalia
- Phylum: Arthropoda
- Class: Insecta
- Order: Lepidoptera
- Family: Crambidae
- Genus: Maracayia
- Species: M. percludalis

Binomial name
- Maracayia percludalis (Möschler, 1881)

Synonyms
- Botis percludalis Möschler, 1881

Species of moth

Maracayia percludalis is a species of moth in the family Crambidae. It was first described by Heinrich Benno Möschler in 1881. It is found in Suriname.
