= Ceratocilia gilippusalis =

Scientific classification
- Kingdom: Animalia
- Phylum: Arthropoda
- Class: Insecta
- Order: Lepidoptera
- Family: Crambidae
- Genus: Ceratocilia
- Species: C. gilippusalis

Binomial name
- Ceratocilia gilippusalis (Walker, 1859)

Synonyms
- Hoterodes gilippusalis Walker, 1859

Species of moth

Ceratocilia gilippusalis is a species of moth in the family Crambidae. It was first described by Francis Walker in 1859. It is found in Brazil.
