= Erilusa croceipes =

Scientific classification
- Domain: Eukaryota
- Kingdom: Animalia
- Phylum: Arthropoda
- Class: Insecta
- Order: Lepidoptera
- Family: Crambidae
- Genus: Erilusa
- Species: E. croceipes

Binomial name
- Erilusa croceipes C. Felder, R. Felder & Rogenhofer, 1875

Species of moth

Erilusa croceipes is a species of moth in the family Crambidae. It was first described by Cajetan Felder, Rudolf Felder and Alois Friedrich Rogenhofer in 1875. It is found in Amazonas, Brazil.
