= Asciodes titubalis =

Scientific classification
- Kingdom: Animalia
- Phylum: Arthropoda
- Class: Insecta
- Order: Lepidoptera
- Family: Crambidae
- Genus: Asciodes
- Species: A. titubalis

Binomial name
- Asciodes titubalis Möschler, 1890

Species of moth

Asciodes titubalis is a species of moth in the family Crambidae. It was described by Heinrich Benno Möschler in 1890. It is found in Puerto Rico.
