= Ceratoclasis tenebralis =

Scientific classification
- Kingdom: Animalia
- Phylum: Arthropoda
- Class: Insecta
- Order: Lepidoptera
- Family: Crambidae
- Genus: Ceratoclasis
- Species: C. tenebralis

Binomial name
- Ceratoclasis tenebralis Snellen, 1875

Species of moth

Ceratoclasis tenebralis is a species of moth in the family Crambidae. It was first described by Snellen in 1875. It is found in Colombia.
