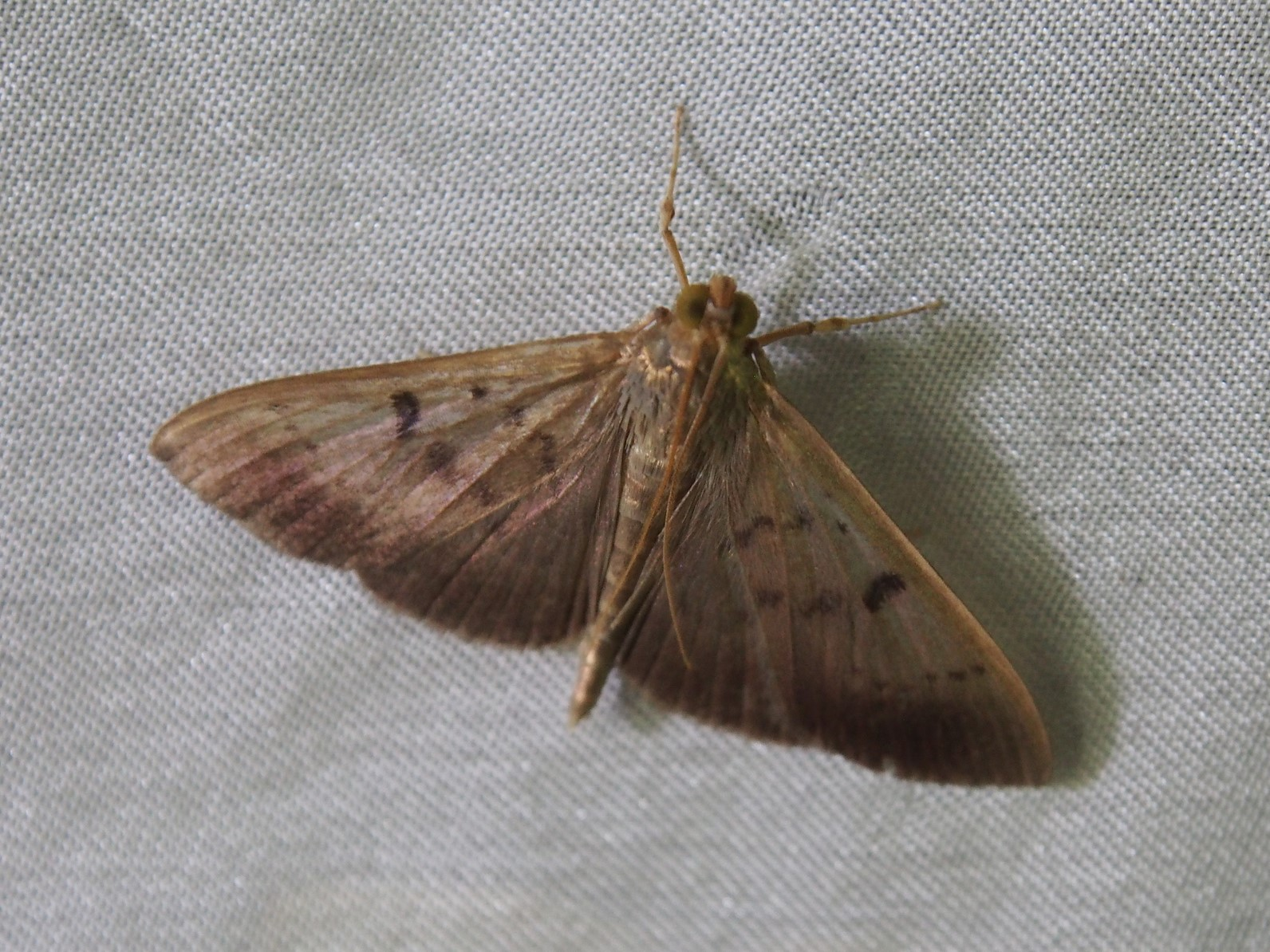

Scientific classification
- Kingdom: Animalia
- Phylum: Arthropoda
- Class: Insecta
- Order: Lepidoptera
- Family: Crambidae
- Genus: Ceratocilia
- Species: C. sixolalis

Binomial name
- Ceratocilia sixolalis (Schaus, 1912)

Synonyms
- Pilocrosis sixolalis Schaus, 1912

= Ceratocilia sixolalis =

Species of moth

Ceratocilia sixolalis is a species of moth in the family Crambidae. It was first described by Schaus in 1912 and is found in Costa Rica.
