= Ceratoclasis =

Scientific classification
- Kingdom: Animalia
- Phylum: Arthropoda
- Clade: Pancrustacea
- Class: Insecta
- Order: Lepidoptera
- Family: Crambidae
- Tribe: Asciodini
- Genus: Ceratoclasis; Lederer, 1863

Synonyms
- Ceratoclassis Hulst, 1886

Genus of moths

Ceratoclasis is a genus of moths of the family Crambidae.

== Species ==
- Ceratoclasis avilalis Amsel, 1956
- Ceratoclasis cyclostigma (Dyar, 1914)
- Ceratoclasis delimitalis (Guenée, 1854)
- Ceratoclasis discodontalis (Hampson, 1899)
- Ceratoclasis imbrexalis (Walker, 1859)
- Ceratoclasis lehialis (Druce, 1899)
- Ceratoclasis metatalis Möschler, 1890
- Ceratoclasis sulpitialis Swinhoe, 1906
- Ceratoclasis tenebralis Snellen, 1875
