= Maracayia chlorisalis =

Scientific classification
- Kingdom: Animalia
- Phylum: Arthropoda
- Class: Insecta
- Order: Lepidoptera
- Family: Crambidae
- Genus: Maracayia
- Species: M. chlorisalis

Binomial name
- Maracayia chlorisalis (Walker, 1859)

Synonyms
- Botys chlorisalis Walker, 1859

Species of moth

Maracayia chlorisalis is a species of moth in the family Crambidae that was first described by Francis Walker in 1859. It is found from North America through Costa Rica southwards at least to Brazil.
