= Bicilia persinualis =

Scientific classification
- Kingdom: Animalia
- Phylum: Arthropoda
- Clade: Pancrustacea
- Class: Insecta
- Order: Lepidoptera
- Family: Crambidae
- Genus: Bicilia
- Species: B. persinualis

Binomial name
- Bicilia persinualis (Hampson, 1899)

Synonyms
- Nacoleia persinualis Hampson, 1899; Voliba major Warren, 1889

Species of moth

Bicilia persinualis is a species of moth in the family Crambidae. It was described by George Hampson in 1899. It is found in Brazil.
