= Loxomorpha pulchellalis =

Scientific classification
- Kingdom: Animalia
- Phylum: Arthropoda
- Class: Insecta
- Order: Lepidoptera
- Family: Crambidae
- Genus: Loxomorpha
- Species: L. pulchellalis

Binomial name
- Loxomorpha pulchellalis (Dyar, 1922)

Synonyms
- Mimorista pulchellalis Dyar, 1922

Species of moth

Loxomorpha pulchellalis is a species of moth in the family Crambidae which was first described by Harrison Gray Dyar Jr. in 1922. It is found in Argentina and South Africa.
