= Ceratocilia liberalis =

Scientific classification
- Kingdom: Animalia
- Phylum: Arthropoda
- Class: Insecta
- Order: Lepidoptera
- Family: Crambidae
- Genus: Ceratocilia
- Species: C. liberalis

Binomial name
- Ceratocilia liberalis (Guenée, 1854)

Synonyms
- Pilocrosis liberalis Guenée, 1854

Species of moth

Ceratocilia liberalis is a species of moth in the family Crambidae. It was first described by Achille Guenée in 1854. It is found in French Guiana and Brazil.
