= Sathria simmialis =

Scientific classification
- Kingdom: Animalia
- Phylum: Arthropoda
- Class: Insecta
- Order: Lepidoptera
- Family: Crambidae
- Genus: Sathria
- Species: S. simmialis

Binomial name
- Sathria simmialis (Walker, 1859)

Synonyms
- Botys simmialis Walker, 1859; Pyralis disparalis Walker, 1866

Species of moth

Sathria simmialis is a species of moth in the family Crambidae. It is found in Jamaica, the Grenadines, Nevis, Saint Martin, Saint Kitts, Guadeloupe, Dominica and Grenada.
