= Bicilia lentistrialis =

Scientific classification
- Kingdom: Animalia
- Phylum: Arthropoda
- Clade: Pancrustacea
- Class: Insecta
- Order: Lepidoptera
- Family: Crambidae
- Genus: Bicilia
- Species: B. lentistrialis

Binomial name
- Bicilia lentistrialis (Dognin, 1906)

Synonyms
- Nacoleia lentistrialis Dognin, 1906

Species of moth

Bicilia lentistrialis is a species of moth in the family Crambidae. It was described by Paul Dognin in 1906. It is found in Paraguay.
