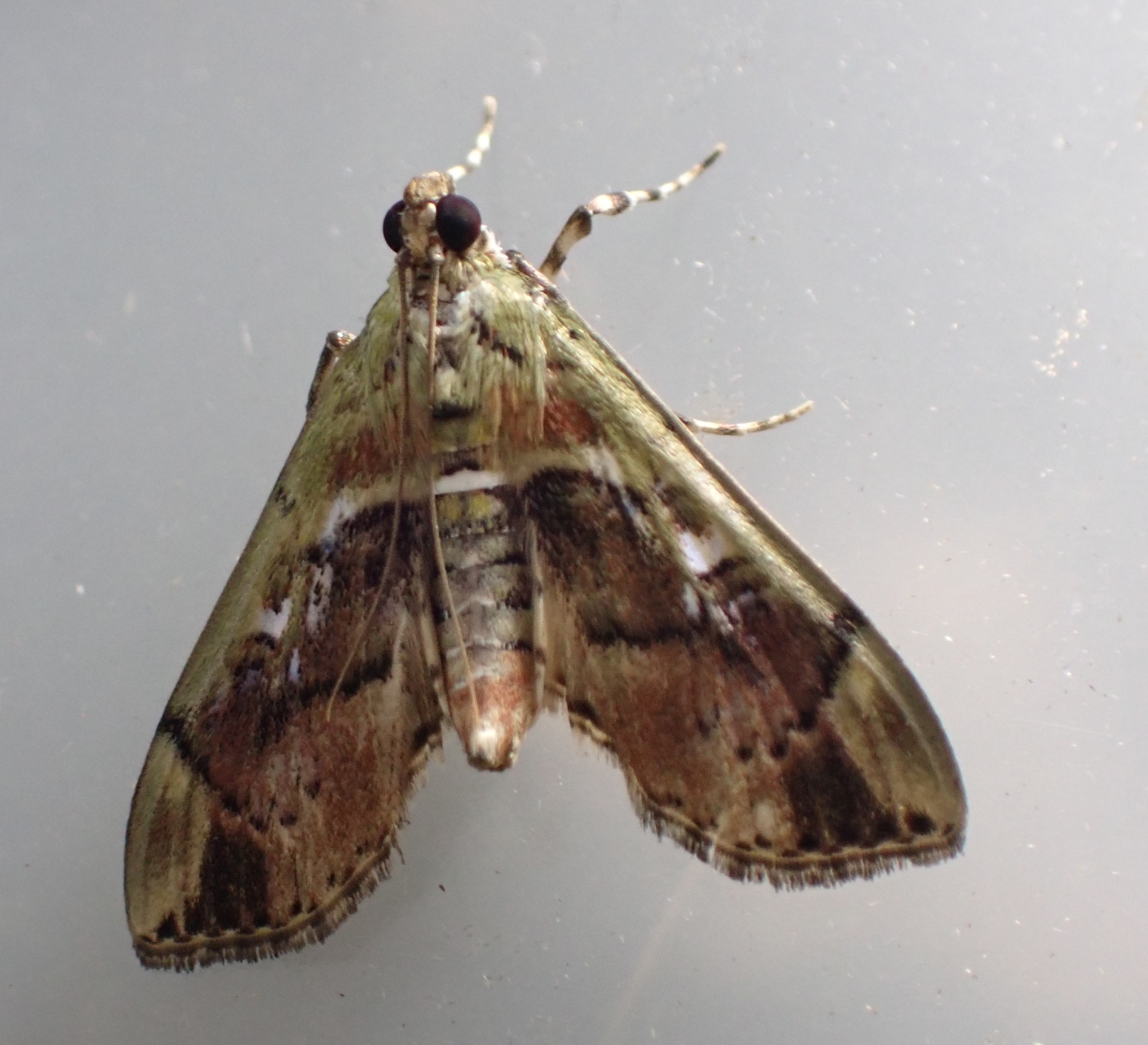

Scientific classification
- Kingdom: Animalia
- Phylum: Arthropoda
- Class: Insecta
- Order: Lepidoptera
- Family: Crambidae
- Genus: Sathria
- Species: S. internitalis

Binomial name
- Sathria internitalis (Guenée, 1854)

Synonyms
- Asciodes internitalis Guenée, 1854; Megaphysa serenalis Walker, 1866; Sathria stercoralis Lederer, 1863

= Sathria internitalis =

Species of moth

Sathria internitalis is a species of moth in the family Crambidae. It is found in Haiti, the Dominican Republic, Cuba and Florida.
