= Maracayia =

Scientific classification
- Kingdom: Animalia
- Phylum: Arthropoda
- Class: Insecta
- Order: Lepidoptera
- Family: Crambidae
- Tribe: Asciodini
- Genus: Maracayia; Amsel, 1956

Genus of moths

Maracayia is a genus of moths of the family Crambidae. The genus was first described by Hans Georg Amsel in 1956.

== Species ==
- Maracayia chlorisalis (Walker, 1859)
- Maracayia percludalis (Möschler, 1881)
