= Asciodes scopulalis =

Scientific classification
- Kingdom: Animalia
- Phylum: Arthropoda
- Class: Insecta
- Order: Lepidoptera
- Family: Crambidae
- Genus: Asciodes
- Species: A. scopulalis

Binomial name
- Asciodes scopulalis Guenée, 1854

Species of moth

Asciodes scopulalis is a species of moth in the family Crambidae. It was described by Achille Guenée in 1854. It is found in Brazil.
