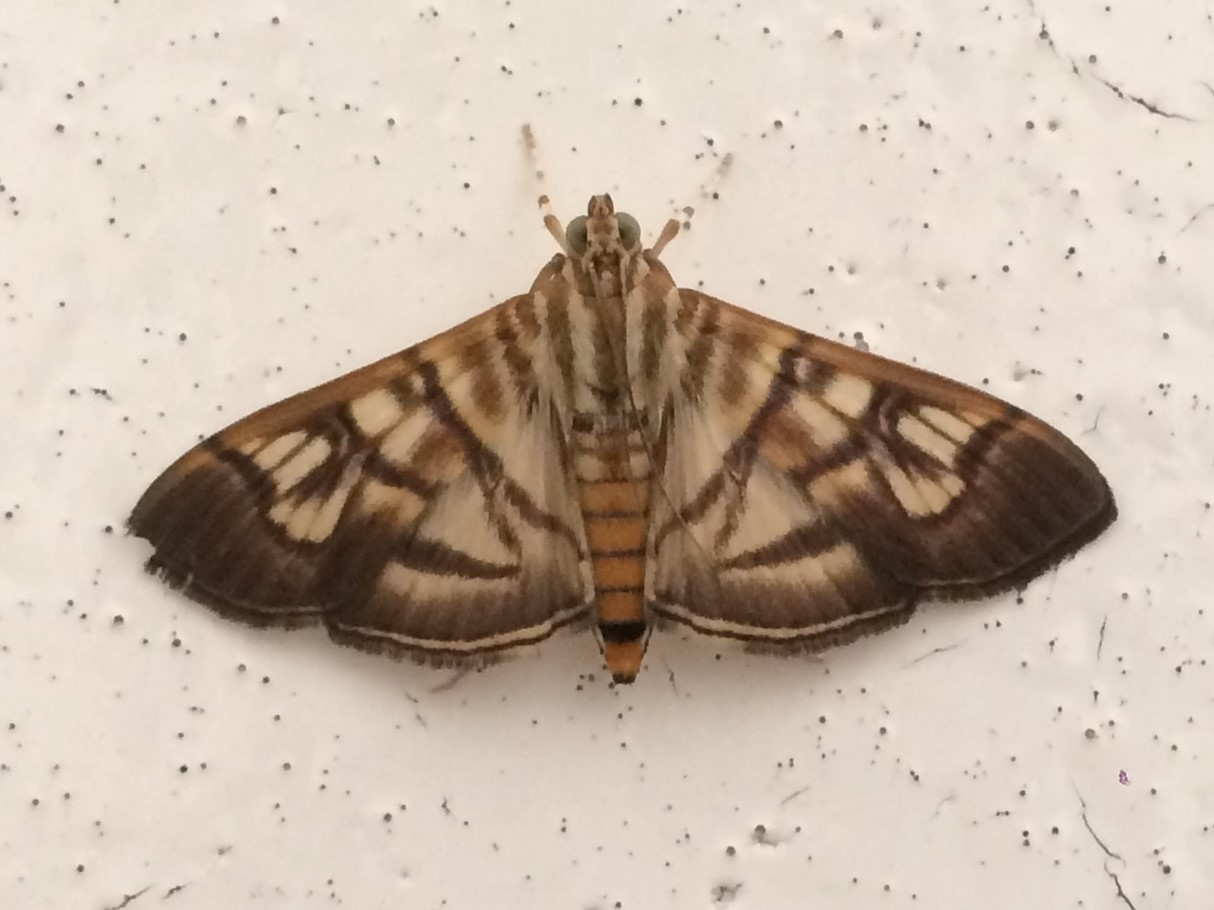

Scientific classification
- Kingdom: Animalia
- Phylum: Arthropoda
- Clade: Pancrustacea
- Class: Insecta
- Order: Lepidoptera
- Family: Crambidae
- Tribe: Asciodini
- Genus: Arthromastix; Warren, 1890
- Species: A. lauralis

Binomial name
- Arthromastix lauralis (Walker, 1859)

Synonyms
- Salbia lauralis Walker, 1859; Ceratoclasis verecundalis Berg, 1874

= Arthromastix =

Genus of moths

Arthromastix is a genus of moths of the family Crambidae. It contains only one species, Arthromastix lauralis, which is found in Central America (including Belize, Costa Rica), South America (including Brazil, Venezuela, Bolivia, Argentina), as well as the Dominican Republic and Cuba.

== Description ==
The forewings are yellowish white with a broad cupreous-brown border and a yellow marginal line.

== Behaviour and ecology ==
The larvae feed on Trichostigma octandrum.
