= Asciodes denticulinea =

Scientific classification
- Kingdom: Animalia
- Phylum: Arthropoda
- Class: Insecta
- Order: Lepidoptera
- Family: Crambidae
- Genus: Asciodes
- Species: A. denticulinea

Binomial name
- Asciodes denticulinea (Schaus, 1940)

Synonyms
- Sylepta denticulinea Schaus, 1940

Species of moth

Asciodes denticulinea is a species of moth in the family Crambidae. It was described by Schaus in 1940. It is found in Puerto Rico.
