= Ceratocilia femoralis =

Scientific classification
- Kingdom: Animalia
- Phylum: Arthropoda
- Class: Insecta
- Order: Lepidoptera
- Family: Crambidae
- Genus: Ceratocilia
- Species: C. femoralis

Binomial name
- Ceratocilia femoralis (Hampson, 1912)

Synonyms
- Pilocrosis femoralis Hampson, 1912

Species of moth

Ceratocilia femoralis is a species of moth in the family Crambidae. It was first described by George Hampson in 1912. It is found in Peru.
