= Ceratocilia damonalis =

Scientific classification
- Kingdom: Animalia
- Phylum: Arthropoda
- Class: Insecta
- Order: Lepidoptera
- Family: Crambidae
- Genus: Ceratocilia
- Species: C. damonalis

Binomial name
- Ceratocilia damonalis (Walker, 1859)

Synonyms
- Botys damonalis Walker, 1859; Pilocrocis damonalis

Species of moth

Ceratocilia damonalis is a species of moth in the family Crambidae. It was described by Francis Walker in 1859. It is found in the Amazon region of Brazil.
