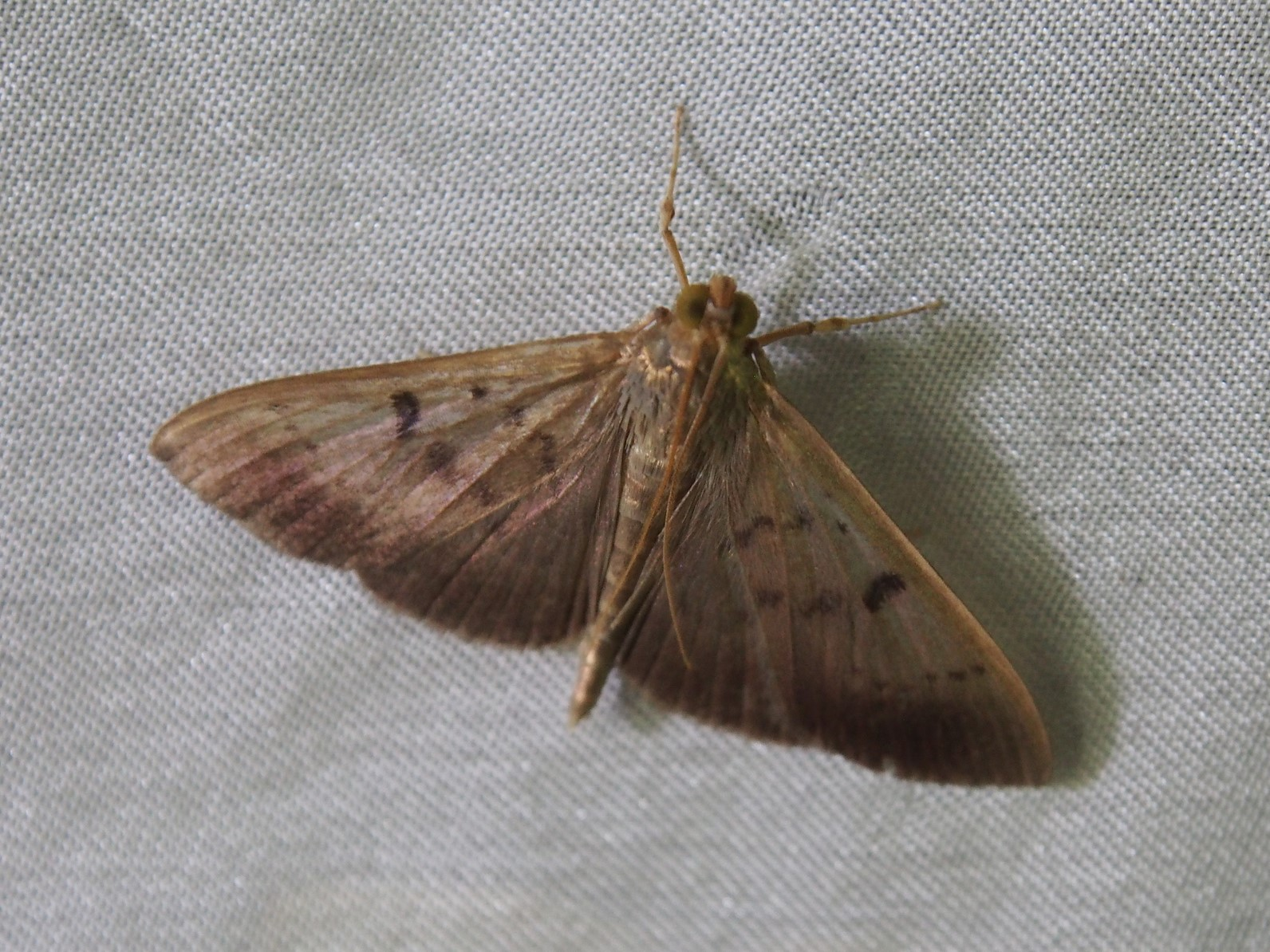
- Ceratocilia sixolalis

Scientific classification
- Kingdom: Animalia
- Phylum: Arthropoda
- Class: Insecta
- Order: Lepidoptera
- Family: Crambidae
- Tribe: Asciodini
- Genus: Ceratocilia; Amsel, 1956

= Ceratocilia =

Genus of moths

Ceratocilia is a genus of moths of the family Crambidae.

== Species ==
- Ceratocilia damonalis (Walker, 1859)
- Ceratocilia falsalis (Schaus, 1912)
- Ceratocilia femoralis (Hampson, 1912)
- Ceratocilia gilippusalis (Walker, 1859)
- Ceratocilia liberalis Guenée, 1854
- Ceratocilia maceralis (Walker, 1859)
- Ceratocilia pallidipuncta (Dognin, 1905)
- Ceratocilia sixolalis (Schaus, 1912)
