= Loxomorpha amseli =

Scientific classification
- Kingdom: Animalia
- Phylum: Arthropoda
- Class: Insecta
- Order: Lepidoptera
- Family: Crambidae
- Genus: Loxomorpha
- Species: L. amseli

Binomial name
- Loxomorpha amseli Munroe, 1995

Synonyms
- Loxomorpha citrinalis Amsel, 1956 (preocc.)

Species of moth

Loxomorpha amseli is a species of moth in the family Crambidae. It was first described by Eugene G. Munroe in 1995. It is found in Venezuela.
