= Bicilia iarchasalis =

Scientific classification
- Kingdom: Animalia
- Phylum: Arthropoda
- Clade: Pancrustacea
- Class: Insecta
- Order: Lepidoptera
- Family: Crambidae
- Genus: Bicilia
- Species: B. iarchasalis

Binomial name
- Bicilia iarchasalis (Walker, 1859)

Synonyms
- List: Botys iarchasalis Walker, 1859; Lamprosema iarchasalis; Bicilia fuscalis Amsel, 1956; Bicilia vogli Amsel, 1956; Botys concinnalis Möschler, 1890; Pyralis differalis Walker, 1966

Species of moth

Bicilia iarchasalis is a species of moth in the family Crambidae. It was described by Francis Walker in 1859. It is found in the south-eastern United States, where it has been recorded from Florida and Texas, as well as in Mexico, Cuba, the Dominican Republic, Puerto Rico and Venezuela.

Adults are on wing from March to May and from August to September.

The larvae feed on Rivina humilis.
