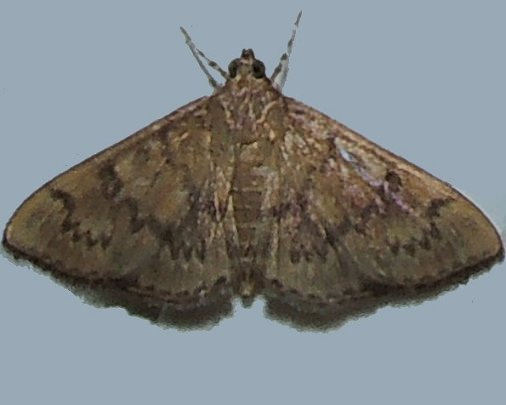
- Psara obscuralis

Scientific classification
- Kingdom: Animalia
- Phylum: Arthropoda
- Clade: Pancrustacea
- Class: Insecta
- Order: Lepidoptera
- Family: Crambidae
- Subfamily: Spilomelinae
- Tribe: Asciodini; Mally et al., 2019

= Asciodini =

Tribe of moths

Asciodini is a tribe of the species-rich subfamily Spilomelinae in the pyraloid moth family Crambidae. The tribe was erected by Richard Mally, James E. Hayden, Christoph Neinhuis, Bjarte H. Jordal and Matthias Nuss in 2019.

Asciodini currently comprises 79 species in the following 13 genera:

- Arthromastix Warren, 1890
- Asciodes Guenée, 1854
- Beebea Schaus, 1923
- Bicilia Amsel, 1956
- Ceratocilia Amsel, 1956
- Ceratoclasis Lederer, 1863 (= Ceratoclassis Hulst, 1886)
- Erilusa Walker, 1866
- Laniifera Hampson, 1899
- Laniipriva Munroe, 1976
- Loxomorpha Amsel, 1956 (= Chrysobotys Munroe, 1956)
- Maracayia Amsel, 1956
- Psara Snellen, 1875 (= Epichronistis Meyrick, 1886)
- Sathria Lederer, 1863
