= Erilusa secta =

Scientific classification
- Kingdom: Animalia
- Phylum: Arthropoda
- Class: Insecta
- Order: Lepidoptera
- Family: Crambidae
- Genus: Erilusa
- Species: E. secta

Binomial name
- Erilusa secta (Walker, 1856)

Synonyms
- Agyrta secta Walker, 1856; Syllepte secta; Erilusa dioptoides Walker, 1866; Erilusa radialis C. Felder, R. Felder & Rogenhofer, 1875

Species of moth

Erilusa secta is a species of moth in the family Crambidae. It is found in the Brazilian states of Pará and Amazonas.
