= Ceratoclasis lehialis =

Scientific classification
- Kingdom: Animalia
- Phylum: Arthropoda
- Class: Insecta
- Order: Lepidoptera
- Family: Crambidae
- Genus: Ceratoclasis
- Species: C. lehialis

Binomial name
- Ceratoclasis lehialis (H. Druce, 1899)

Synonyms
- Hedylepta lehialis H. Druce, 1899

Species of moth

Ceratoclasis lehialis is a species of moth in the family Crambidae. It was first described by Herbert Druce in 1899. It is found in the state of Tabasco, Mexico.
