= Ceratocilia pallidipuncta =

Scientific classification
- Kingdom: Animalia
- Phylum: Arthropoda
- Class: Insecta
- Order: Lepidoptera
- Family: Crambidae
- Genus: Ceratocilia
- Species: C. pallidipuncta

Binomial name
- Ceratocilia pallidipuncta (Dognin, 1905)

Synonyms
- Pilocrocis pallidipuncta Dognin, 1905

Species of moth

Ceratocilia pallidipuncta is a species of moth in the family Crambidae. It was first described by Paul Dognin in 1905. It is found in Ecuador.
