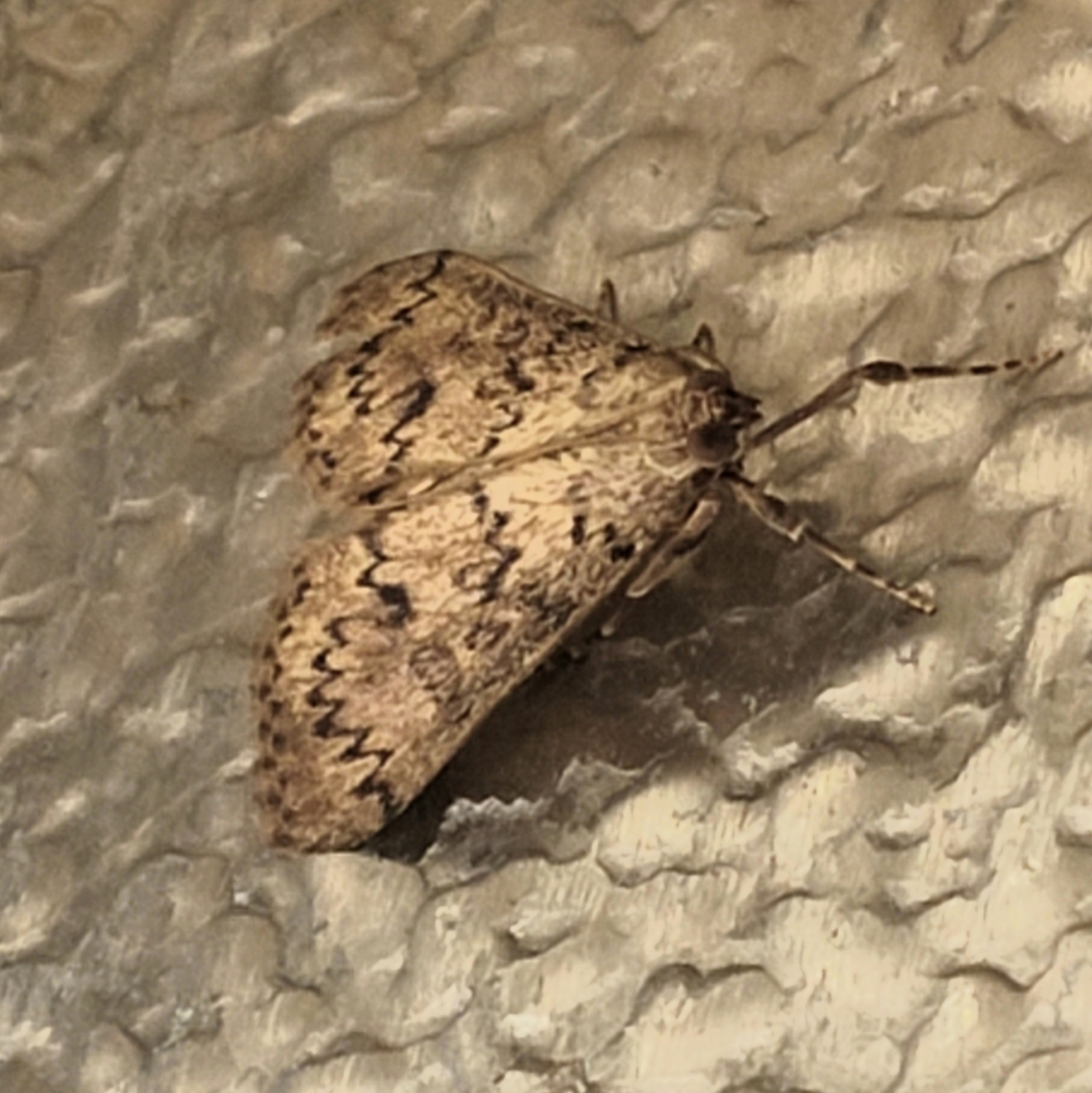

Scientific classification
- Kingdom: Animalia
- Phylum: Arthropoda
- Class: Insecta
- Order: Lepidoptera
- Family: Crambidae
- Genus: Asciodes
- Species: A. gordialis

Binomial name
- Asciodes gordialis Guenée, 1854

Synonyms
- Desmia confusalis Hulst, 1886; Scoparia quietalis Walker, 1859

= Asciodes gordialis =

Bougainvillea caterpillar moth

Species of moth

Asciodes gordialis, the bougainvillea caterpillar moth, is a moth in the family Crambidae. It was described by Achille Guenée in 1854. It is found across the southern United States, in the West Indies (including Cuba and the Dominican Republic) and in South America (including French Guiana, Ecuador and Argentina).

The wingspan is about 25 mm.

The larvae feed on Bougainvillea species.
