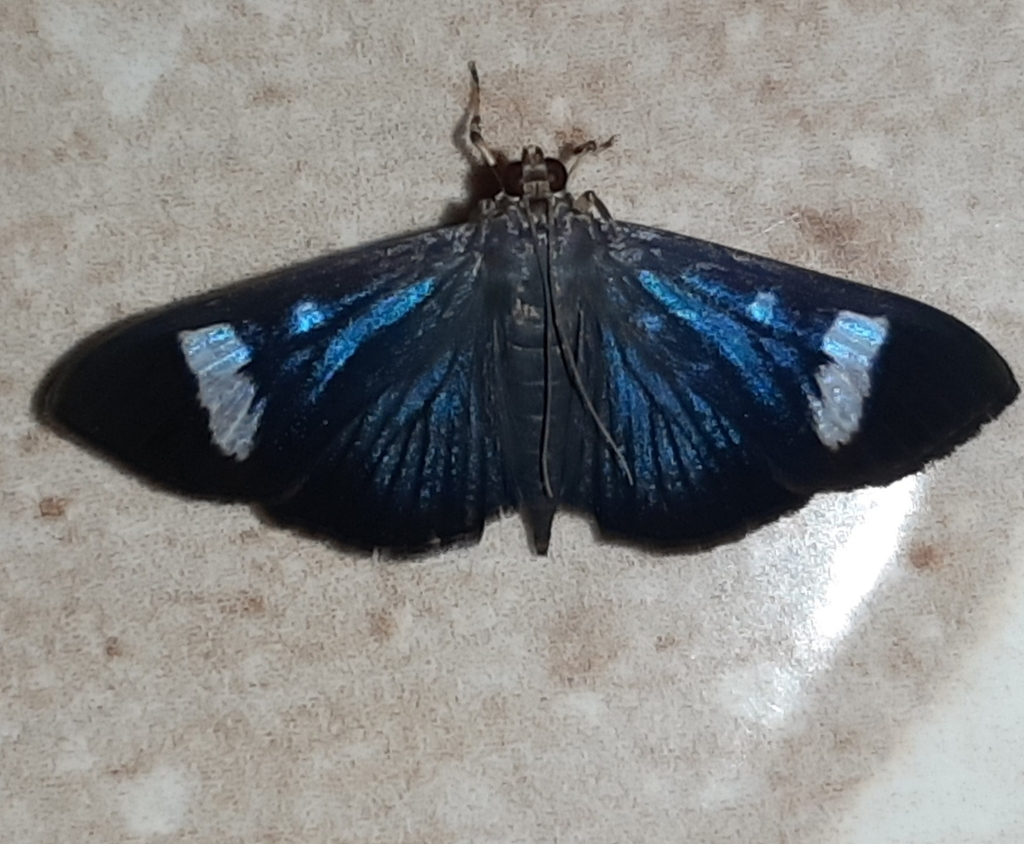

Scientific classification
- Kingdom: Animalia
- Phylum: Arthropoda
- Class: Insecta
- Order: Lepidoptera
- Family: Crambidae
- Genus: Erilusa
- Species: E. leucoplagalis

Binomial name
- Erilusa leucoplagalis (Hampson, 1899)

Synonyms
- Pilocrocis leucoplagalis Hampson, 1899; Erilusa leucoplagis Amsel, 1957; Pilocrocis cachiana Strand, 1920

= Erilusa leucoplagalis =

Species of moth

Erilusa leucoplagalis is a species of moth in the family Crambidae. It was described by George Hampson in 1899. It is found in Mexico (Veracruz, Xalapa), Costa Rica and Cuba.
