= Ceratoclasis cyclostigma =

Scientific classification
- Kingdom: Animalia
- Phylum: Arthropoda
- Class: Insecta
- Order: Lepidoptera
- Family: Crambidae
- Genus: Ceratoclasis
- Species: C. cyclostigma

Binomial name
- Ceratoclasis cyclostigma (Dyar, 1914)

Synonyms
- Pilocrocis cyclostigma Dyar, 1914

Species of moth

Ceratoclasis cyclostigma is a species of moth in the family Crambidae. It was first described by Harrison Gray Dyar Jr. in 1914. It is found in Panama.

== Description ==
The wingspan is about 20 mm. The forewings are blackish brown, with a slight bronze tinge and dark lines. Adults have been recorded on wing in May and August.
