= Syllepte coelivitta =

Scientific classification
- Domain: Eukaryota
- Kingdom: Animalia
- Phylum: Arthropoda
- Class: Insecta
- Order: Lepidoptera
- Family: Crambidae
- Genus: Syllepte
- Species: S. coelivitta

Binomial name
- Syllepte coelivitta (Walker, 1866)

Synonyms
- Erilusa coelivitta Walker, 1866; Erilusa dianalis Möschler, 1882; Erilusa nitealis C. Felder, R. Felder & Rogenhofer, 1875

Species of moth

Syllepte coelivitta is a moth in the family Crambidae. It was described by Francis Walker in 1866. It is found in Brazil, Suriname, Mexico and Panama.
