= Guglielmi (surname) =

Guglielmi is an Italian surname that may refer to

- Alejandro Guglielmi (born 1936), Argentine equestrian
- Alighiero Guglielmi (1912−1988), Italian racewalker
- Éric Guglielmi (1970–2021), French photographer, editor, and photojournalist
- Gary Guglielmi (born 1958), Australian speedway hider
- Gregorio Guglielmi (1714−1773), Italian-born fresco painter who worked primarily in Germany
- Louis Guglielmi (1916–1991), Spanish-born French musician
- Marco Guglielmi (1926–2005), Italian actor, screenwriter and author
- Massimo Guglielmi (born 1970), Italian lightweight rower
- Monica Guglielmi (born 1974), Italian former professional tennis player
- Noel Gugliemi, American actor
- O. Louis Guglielmi (1906–1956), American artist
- Pietro Alessandro Guglielmi (1728–1804), Italian opera composer (father of Pietro Carlo Guglielmi)
- Pietro Carlo Guglielmi (1772–1817), Italian opera composer
- Ralph Guglielmi (1933–2017), American football quarterback
- Simon Guglielmi (born 1997), French cyclist
- Rodolfo Alfonso Raffaello Piero Filiberto Guglielmi (1895–1926), known as Rudolph Valentino, Italian actor based in the US
