= Beebea =

Scientific classification
- Kingdom: Animalia
- Phylum: Arthropoda
- Class: Insecta
- Order: Lepidoptera
- Family: Crambidae
- Tribe: Asciodini
- Genus: Beebea; Schaus, 1923
- Species: B. guglielmi

Binomial name
- Beebea guglielmi Schaus, 1923

Genus of moths

Beebea is a genus of moths of the family Crambidae. It contains only one species, Beebea guglielmi, which is found on the Galapagos Islands.
