= Éric Guglielmi =

French photographer (1970–2021)

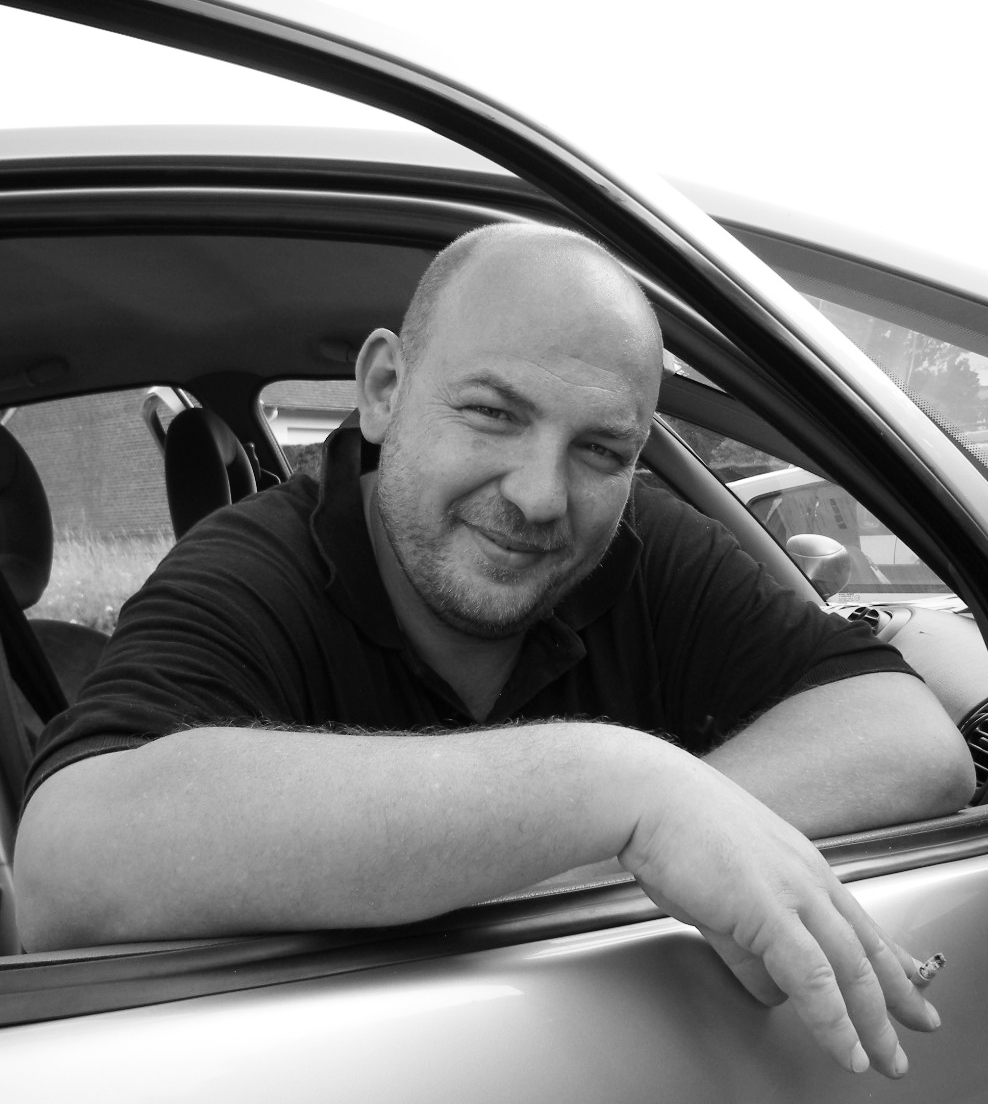
- Guglielmi in 2008
- Born: 10 May 1970; Revin, France
- Died: 19 June 2021 (aged 51); Paris, France
- Occupations: Photographer; Photojournalist

Éric Guglielmi (10 May 1970 – 19 June 2021) was a French photographer, editor, and photojournalist.

== Biography ==
Guglielmi was born and raised in Revin. A self-taught photographer, he captured his first images at the age of twelve with a Praktica camera. He began working on an assembly line at the age of 16. In 1990, he was employed in a photography lab in Paris and subsequently became a fashion photographer. He was inspired by important American photographers.

Guglielmi became a correspondent in Mali for Libération and Jeune Afrique. He covered current events in Bangladesh, the Democratic Republic of the Congo, and Ukraine. During his youth, he was entrenched in the works of Arthur Rimbaud and methodically visited cities mentioned by the poet. He married a Malian woman in Bamako and founded a photo agency, Djaw, as well as a magazine called Tarik Hebdo. He returned to France in 1998.

After a report in Rwanda in 2002, Guglielmi ended his practice of photography for five years. After this time off, he chose to take photographs in long-term projects with a view camera. He also practiced panoramic photography using black and white and color interchangeably.

Guglielmi was impassioned with photographic printing techniques, opening a silver laboratory for all artists who desired to use it. In 2010, he founded Gang, an independent publishing house for photographic books. He received a grant from the Maison de la photographie Robert Doisneau, allowing him to return to Ardennes. He travelled through the department for two years and exhibited his works after his journey was finished.

Éric Guglielmi died in his sleep in Paris on 19 June 2021 at the age of 51.

== Publications ==
- Touba, voyage au cœur d'un islam nègre (2007)
- "Je suis un piéton, rien de plus." Arthur Rimbaud (2011)
- What happens ? (2016)
