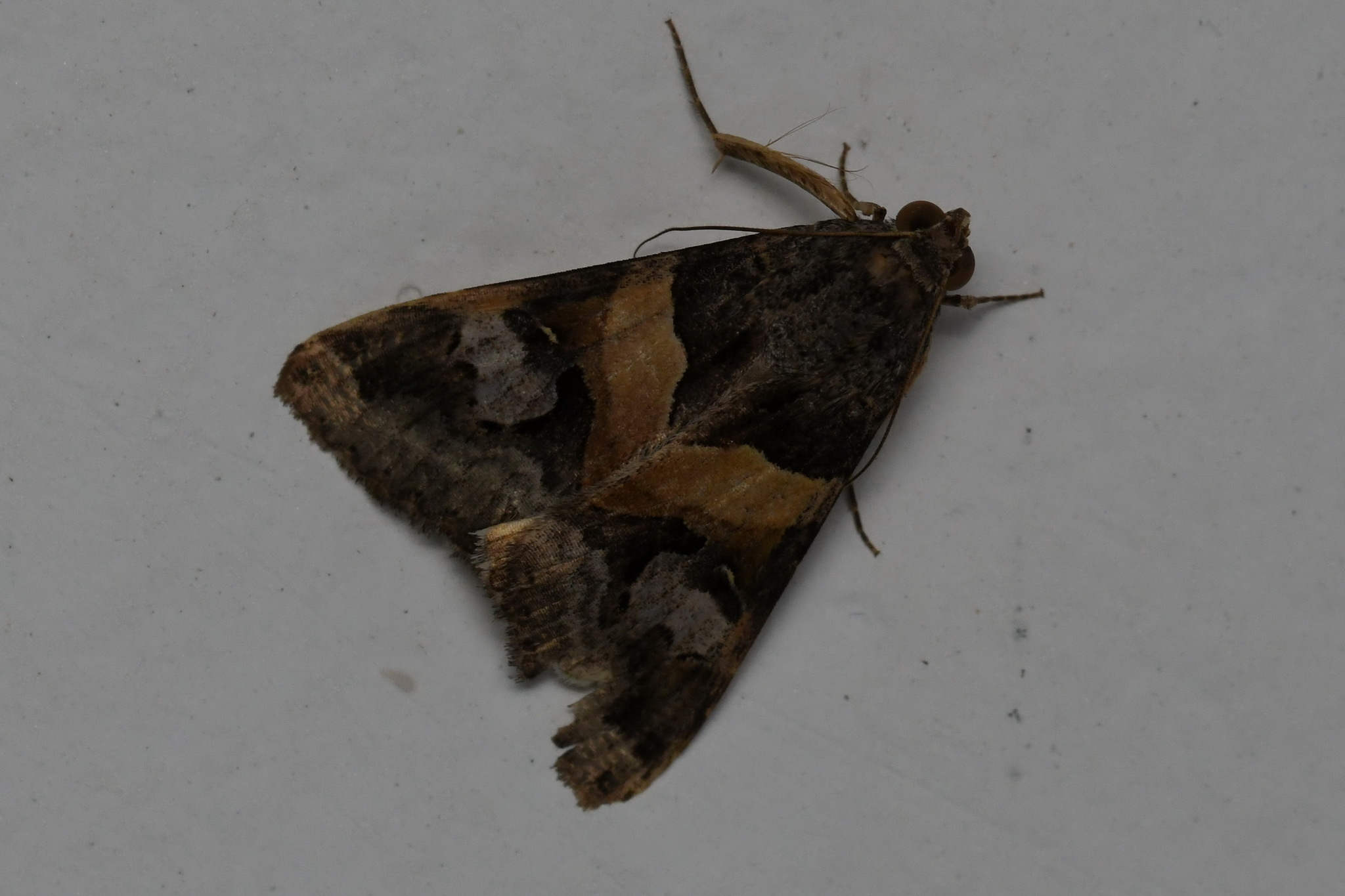
- Melipotis ochrodes

Scientific classification
- Kingdom: Animalia
- Phylum: Arthropoda
- Clade: Pancrustacea
- Class: Insecta
- Order: Lepidoptera
- Superfamily: Noctuoidea
- Family: Erebidae
- Tribe: Melipotini
- Genus: Melipotis; Hübner, 1818

Synonyms
- Heliothis Hübner, 1809 (suppressed ICZN 789); Gerespa Walker, 1858; Coronta Walker, [1858]

= Melipotis =

Genus of moths

Melipotis is a genus of moths in the family Erebidae first described by Jacob Hübner in 1818.

== Description ==
Palpi with second joint obliquely upturned and reaching vertex of head, and long porrect third joint. Antennae with short fasciculated cilia in male. Thorax and abdomen smoothly scaled. Mid and hind tibia with medial and terminal tufts of long spinous hairs. Forewings with somewhat quadrate apex.

== Species ==
The following species are recognised in the genus Melipotis:

- Melipotis abrupta (Snellen, 1887)
- Melipotis acontioides (Guenée, 1852)
- Melipotis agrotoides (Walker, 1858)
- Melipotis albiterminalis (Draudt & Gaede, 1944)
- Melipotis asinus Dognin, 1912
- Melipotis brunnearis (Guenée, 1852)
- Melipotis calamioides (Snellen, 1887)
- Melipotis cellaris (Guenée, 1852)
- Melipotis comprehendens (Walker, 1858)
- Melipotis contorta (Guenée, 1852)
- Melipotis decreta (Walker, 1858)
- Melipotis dispar (Kohler, 1979)
- Melipotis euryphaea (Hampson, 1926)
- Melipotis evelina (Butler, 1878)
- Melipotis famelica (Guenée, 1852)
- Melipotis fasciolaris (Hübner, [1831])
- Melipotis florida Troubridge, 2020
- Melipotis goniosema (Hampson, 1926)
- Melipotis guanicana Schaus, 1940
- Melipotis gubernata (Walker, 1858)
- Melipotis harrisoni Schaus, 1923
- Melipotis imparallela (Guenée, 1852)
- Melipotis indomita (Walker, 1858)
- Melipotis januaris (Guenée, 1852)
- Melipotis jucunda (Hübner, 1818)
- Melipotis lucigera (Walker, 1858)
- Melipotis mesoleuca (Walker, 1869)
- Melipotis nigrobasis (Guenée, 1852)
- Melipotis novanda (Guenée, 1852) (=Melipotis agrotipennis (Harvey, 1875))
- Melipotis obliquivia (Hampson, 1926)
- Melipotis ochrodes (Guenée, 1852)
- Melipotis paracellaris Angulo, 1984
- Melipotis perpendicularis (Guenée, 1852)
- Melipotis prolata (Walker, 1858)
- Melipotis prunescens (Hampson, 1926)
- Melipotis punctifinis (Hampson, 1926)
- Melipotis recipiens (Walker, 1858)
- Melipotis roseata (Draudt & Gaede, 1944)
- Melipotis separata (Walker, 1858)
- Melipotis strigifera (Walker, 1858)
- Melipotis trujillensis Dognin, 1912
- Melipotis tucumanensis Dognin, 1912
- Melipotis walkeri Butler, 1892

=== Former species ===
- Melipotis albisigna (Wileman & South, 1920)
- Melipotis amphix (Cramer, [1777])
- Melipotis diascota (Hampson, 1916)
- Melipotis grandidieri (Viette, 1968)
- Melipotis melanoschista (Meyrick, 1897)
- Melipotis metaleuca (Hampson, 1896)
- Melipotis mimica (Gaede, 1939)
- Melipotis phaeocrossa (Turner, 1932)
- Melipotis unilinea (Swinhoe, 1885)
- Melipotis voeltzkowi (Viette, 1965)
