= Melipotis evelina =

Scientific classification
- Domain: Eukaryota
- Kingdom: Animalia
- Phylum: Arthropoda
- Class: Insecta
- Order: Lepidoptera
- Superfamily: Noctuoidea
- Family: Erebidae
- Genus: Melipotis
- Species: M. evelina

Binomial name
- Melipotis evelina (Butler, 1878)

Synonyms
- Bolina evelina Butler, 1878

Species of moth

Melipotis evelina is a species of moth in the family Erebidae. It is found in Mexico (Yucatán, Mérida) and Jamaica.
