= Melipotis nigrobasis =

Scientific classification
- Kingdom: Animalia
- Phylum: Arthropoda
- Class: Insecta
- Order: Lepidoptera
- Superfamily: Noctuoidea
- Family: Erebidae
- Tribe: Melipotini
- Genus: Melipotis
- Species: M. nigrobasis

Binomial name
- Melipotis nigrobasis (Guenée, 1852)

Species of moth

Melipotis nigrobasis is a species of moth in the family Erebidae. It is found in North America.

The MONA or Hodges number for Melipotis nigrobasis is 8602.
