= Melipotis prolata =

Scientific classification
- Kingdom: Animalia
- Phylum: Arthropoda
- Class: Insecta
- Order: Lepidoptera
- Superfamily: Noctuoidea
- Family: Erebidae
- Tribe: Melipotini
- Genus: Melipotis
- Species: M. prolata

Binomial name
- Melipotis prolata (Walker, 1858)

Species of moth

Melipotis prolata is a species of moth in the family Erebidae. It is found in North America.

The MONA or Hodges number for Melipotis prolata is 8606.
