= Melipotis albiterminalis =

Scientific classification
- Domain: Eukaryota
- Kingdom: Animalia
- Phylum: Arthropoda
- Class: Insecta
- Order: Lepidoptera
- Superfamily: Noctuoidea
- Family: Erebidae
- Genus: Melipotis
- Species: M. albiterminalis

Binomial name
- Melipotis albiterminalis (Draudt & Gaede, 1944)

Synonyms
- Gerespa albiterminalis Draudt & Gaede, 1944

Species of moth

Melipotis albiterminalis is a species of moth in the family Erebidae. It is found in Peru.
