= Melipotis januaris =

Scientific classification
- Kingdom: Animalia
- Phylum: Arthropoda
- Class: Insecta
- Order: Lepidoptera
- Superfamily: Noctuoidea
- Family: Erebidae
- Genus: Melipotis
- Species: M. januaris

Binomial name
- Melipotis januaris (Guenée, 1852)

Synonyms
- Bolina januaris Guenée, 1852; Bolina parcicolor Herrich-Schäffer, 1868; Bolina rectifascia Herrich-Schäffer, 1868; Melipotis argos Druce, 1900; Bolina russaris Guenée, 1852; Bolina excavans Walker, 1858; Bolina subtilis Walker, 1858; Bolina surinamensis Möschler, 1880; Bolina nebulosa Maassen, 1890; Bolina limitata Möschler, 1886; Melipotis bimaculata Möschler; Melipotis confusa Möschler

Species of moth

Melipotis januaris, the January melipotis moth, is a species of moth in the family Erebidae. It was first described by Achille Guenée in 1852. The species has a wide range in the New World and has been recorded from Saint Kitts, Montserrat, Dominica, Saint Lucia, Saint Vincent, Grenada, the Greater Antilles, Florida and from Mexico to Paraguay.

The wingspan is about 35 mm.

The larvae feed on Inga laurina.
