= Melipotis contorta =

Scientific classification
- Domain: Eukaryota
- Kingdom: Animalia
- Phylum: Arthropoda
- Class: Insecta
- Order: Lepidoptera
- Superfamily: Noctuoidea
- Family: Erebidae
- Genus: Melipotis
- Species: M. contorta

Binomial name
- Melipotis contorta (Guenee, 1852)

Synonyms
- Bolina contorta Guenee, 1852; Bolina bistriga Walker, 1858

Species of moth

Melipotis contorta is a species of moth in the family Erebidae. It is found from Florida, through Mexico and Guatemala to Brazil. It is also found in Cuba, St. Thomas, Hispaniola, Puerto Rico, Martinique, Saint Martin, St. Kitts, Antigua and Barbuda and Jamaica.

Adults are on wing from January to February, in May, July and December in Florida.
