= Melipotis brunnearis =

Scientific classification
- Domain: Eukaryota
- Kingdom: Animalia
- Phylum: Arthropoda
- Class: Insecta
- Order: Lepidoptera
- Superfamily: Noctuoidea
- Family: Erebidae
- Genus: Melipotis
- Species: M. brunnearis

Binomial name
- Melipotis brunnearis (Guenée, 1852)

Synonyms
- Bolina brunnearis Guenée, 1852

Species of moth

Melipotis brunnearis is a species of moth in the family Erebidae. It is found in Brazil (Pernambuco).
