= Melipotis abrupta =

Scientific classification
- Kingdom: Animalia
- Phylum: Arthropoda
- Class: Insecta
- Order: Lepidoptera
- Superfamily: Noctuoidea
- Family: Erebidae
- Genus: Melipotis
- Species: M. abrupta

Binomial name
- Melipotis abrupta (Snellen, 1887)

Synonyms
- Bolina abrupta Snellen, 1887

Species of moth

Melipotis abrupta is a species of moth in the family Erebidae. It is found on Curaçao.
