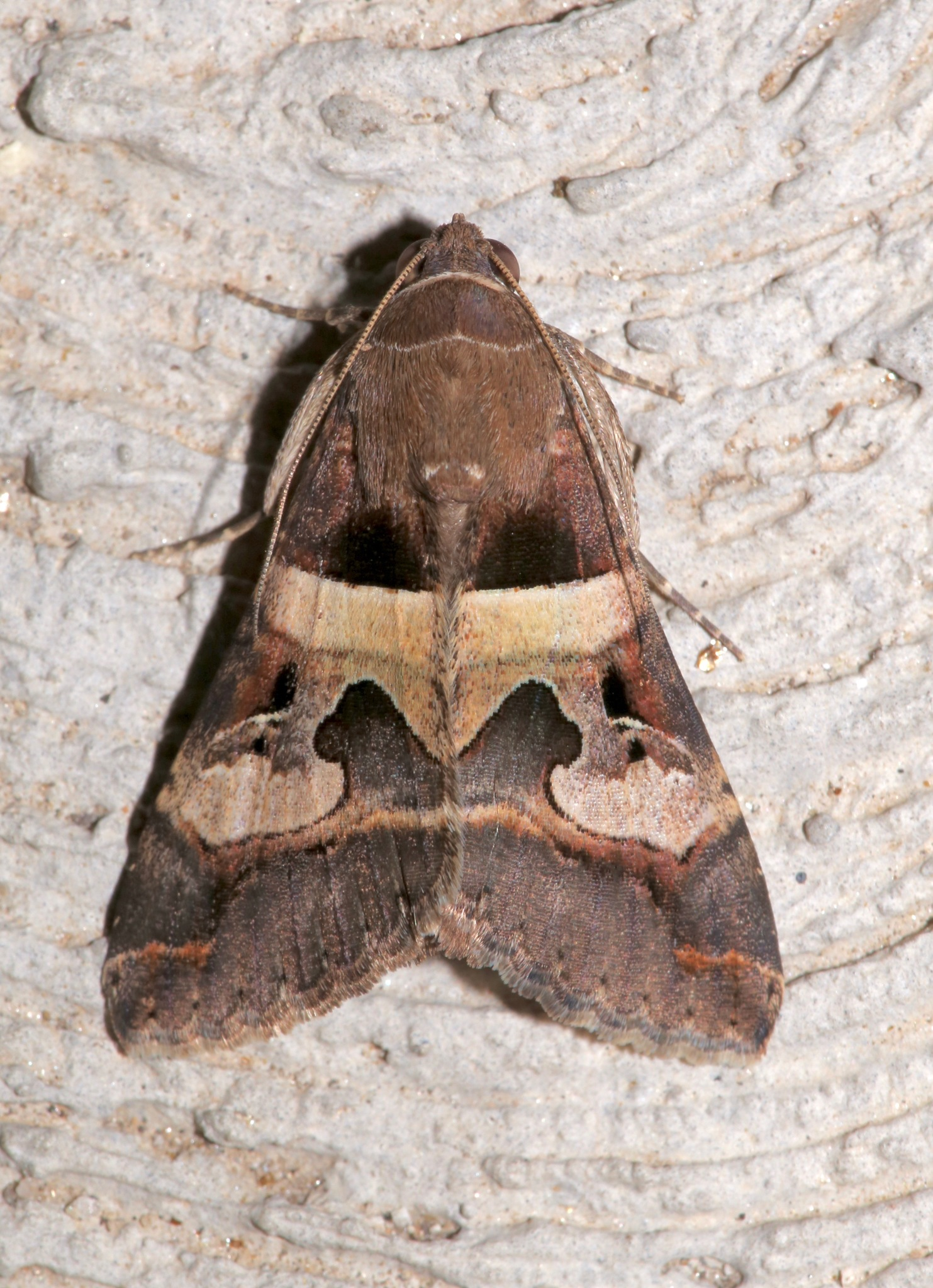

Scientific classification
- Kingdom: Animalia
- Phylum: Arthropoda
- Class: Insecta
- Order: Lepidoptera
- Superfamily: Noctuoidea
- Family: Erebidae
- Genus: Melipotis
- Species: M. perpendicularis

Binomial name
- Melipotis perpendicularis (Guenée, 1852)

= Melipotis perpendicularis =

Species of moth

Melipotis perpendicularis, the perpendicular melipotis moth, is a species of moth in the family Erebidae. It is found in North America.

The MONA or Hodges number for Melipotis perpendicularis is 8598.
