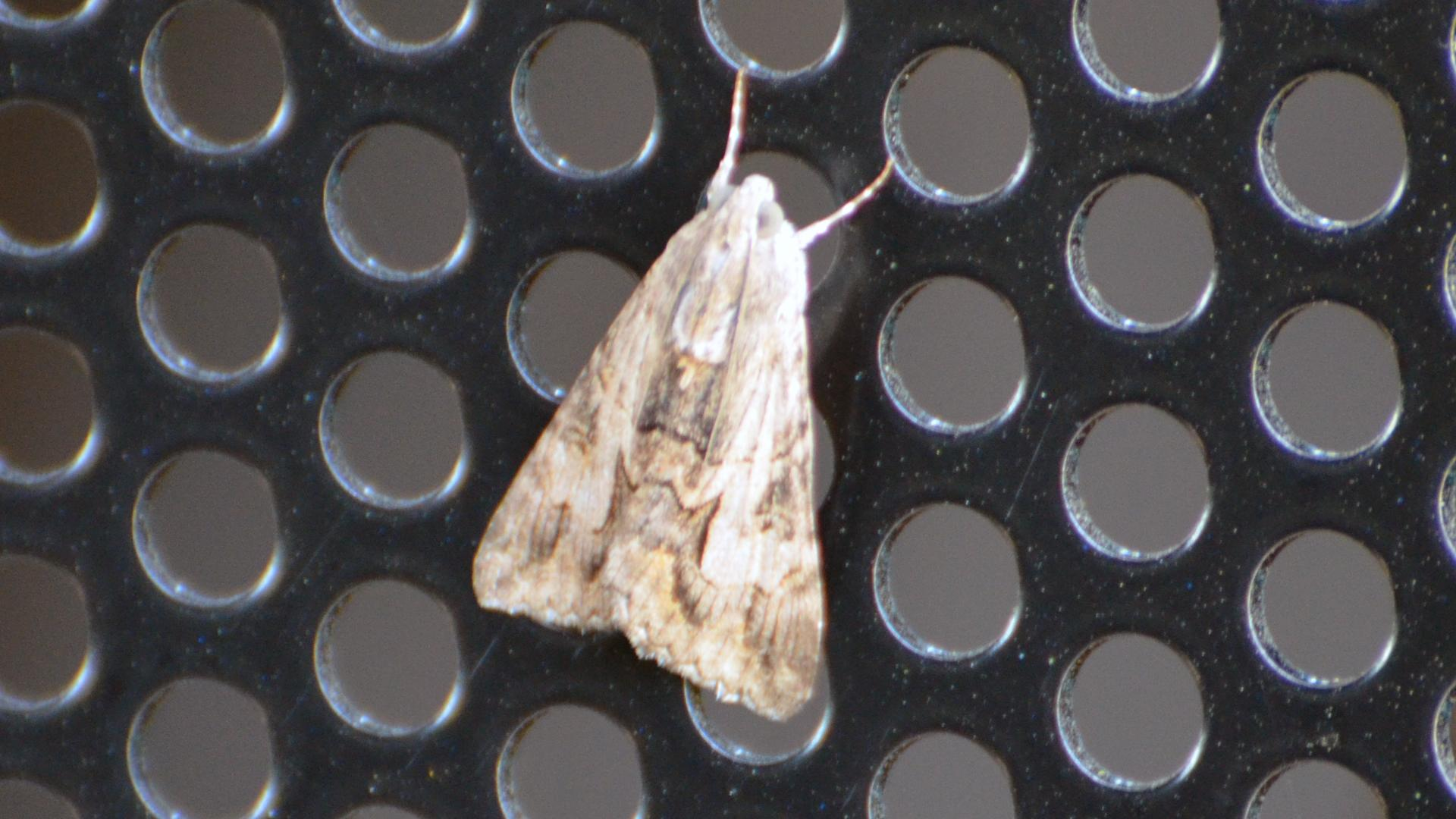

Scientific classification
- Kingdom: Animalia
- Phylum: Arthropoda
- Class: Insecta
- Order: Lepidoptera
- Superfamily: Noctuoidea
- Family: Erebidae
- Genus: Melipotis
- Species: M. jucunda

Binomial name
- Melipotis jucunda Hübner, 1818

Synonyms
- Bolina hadeniformis Behr, 1870; Cirrhobolina tetrica Edwards, 1878; Melipotis versabilis Harvey, 1877

= Melipotis jucunda =

Species of moth

Melipotis jucunda, the merry melipotis moth, is a species of moth in the family Erebidae. It is found in Mexico (Yucatán, Mérida), Colombia, most of the United States, western Canada and northeast Brazil.

The wingspan is 35–42 mm. There are two or three generations in New Jersey and multiple generations in the southern part of the range.

The larvae feed on Salix bonplandia and Salix wrighti, Acacia species and Calliandra eriophylla.

== Subspecies ==
- Melipotis jucunda jucunda
- Melipotis jucunda hadeniformis (Behr, 1870) (California)
