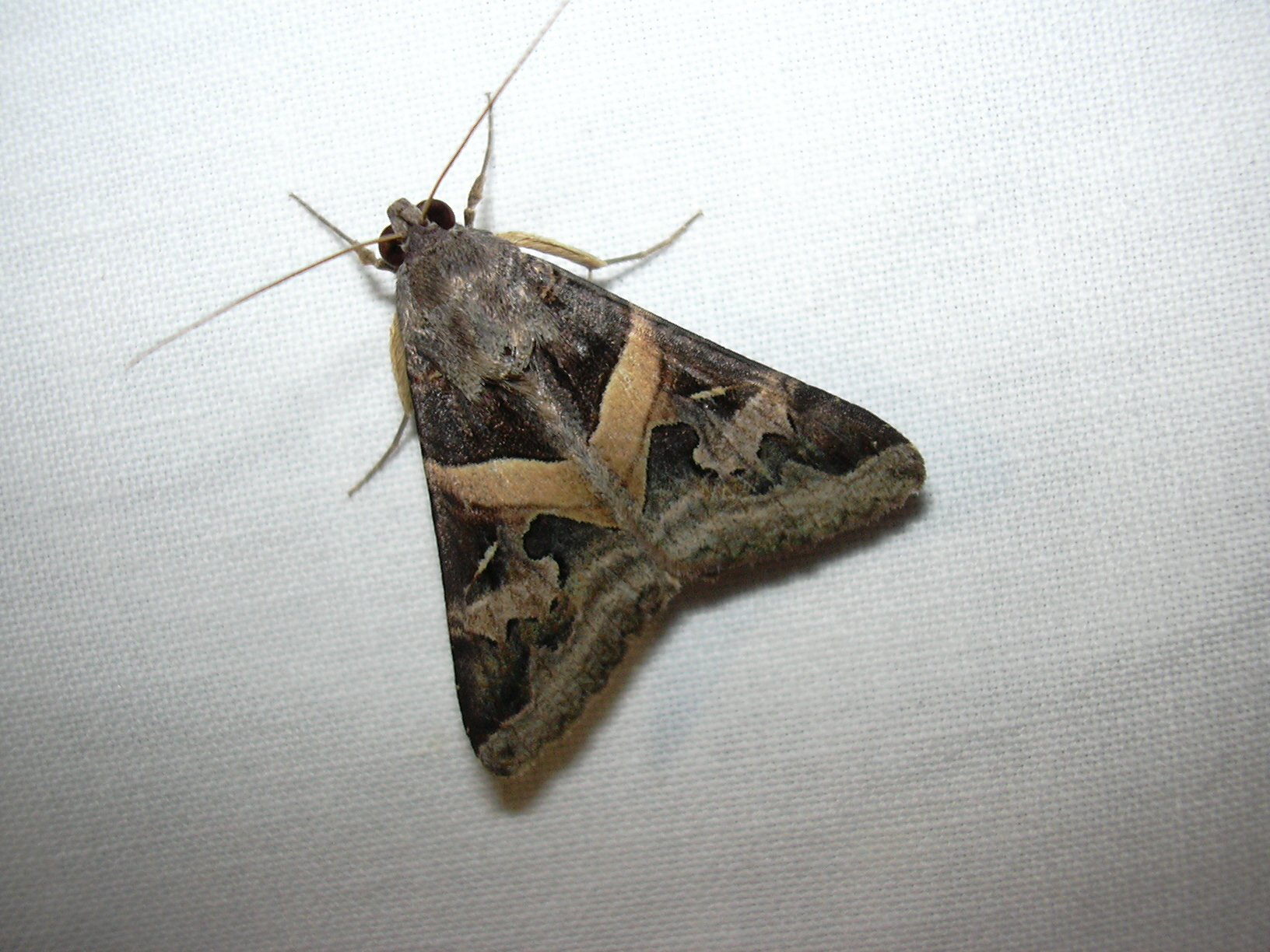

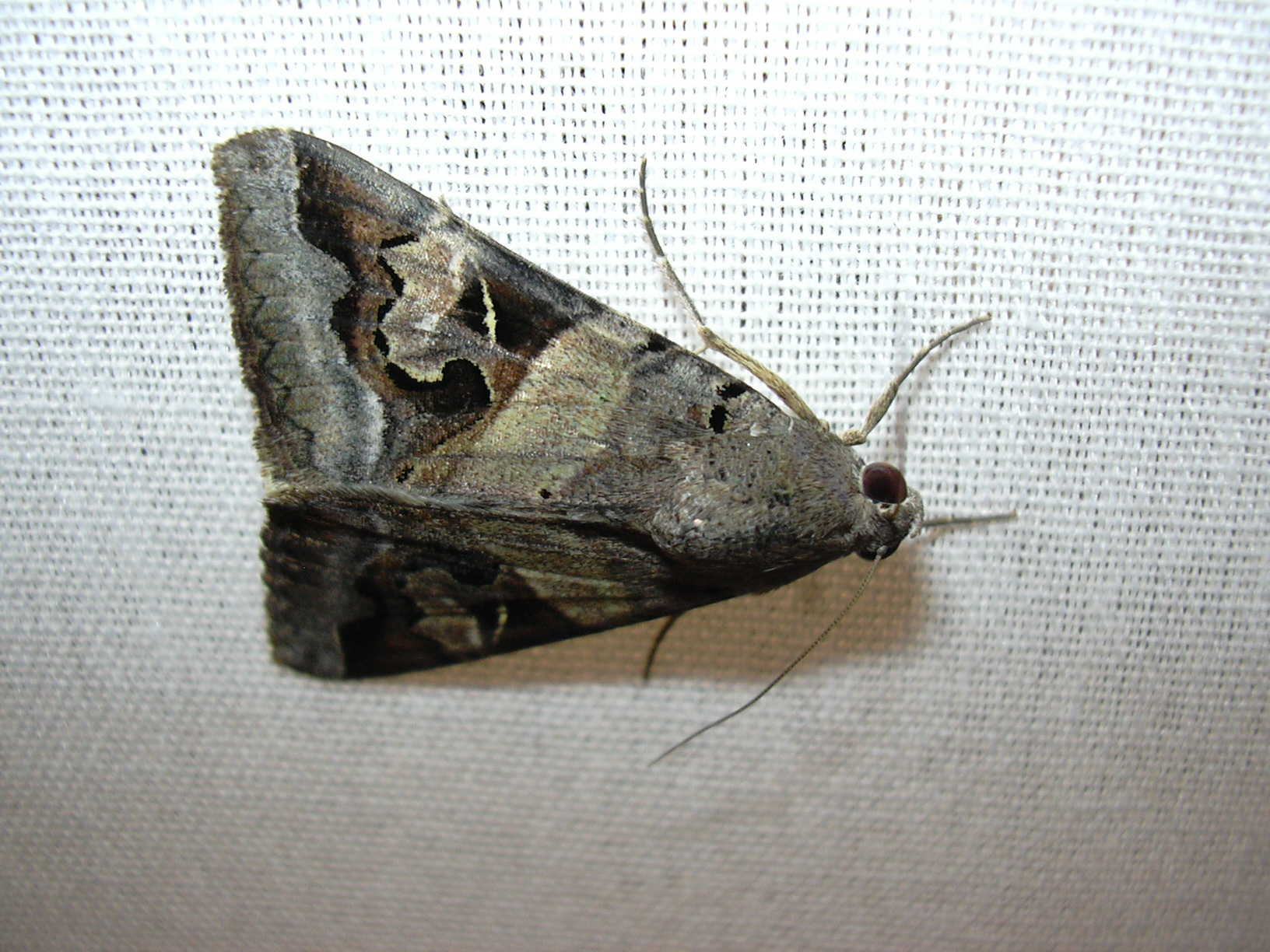

Scientific classification
- Kingdom: Animalia
- Phylum: Arthropoda
- Clade: Pancrustacea
- Class: Insecta
- Order: Lepidoptera
- Superfamily: Noctuoidea
- Family: Erebidae
- Genus: Melipotis
- Species: M. indomita

Binomial name
- Melipotis indomita (Walker, 1858)

Synonyms
- Bolina indomita Walker, 1858; Aedia nigrescens Grote & Robinson, 1866 [secondary homonym of Aedia nigrescens (Wallengren, 1856)]; Melipotis nigrescens (Grote & Robinson, 1866); Bolina ochreipennis Harvey, 1875; Melipotis ochreipennis (Harvey, 1875); Bolina ochreifasciata Grote, 1875; Melipotis ochreifascia (Grote, 1875)

= Melipotis indomita =

Species of moth

Melipotis indomita, the indomitable melipotis, is a moth in the family Erebidae. The species was first described by Francis Walker in 1858. It is found from the West Indies to Mexico, and from Maine, Florida and Minnesota to Texas and California.

The wingspan is 40–55 mm. There are multiple generations per year.

The larvae feed on Prosopis species.
