= Melipotis euryphaea =

Scientific classification
- Kingdom: Animalia
- Phylum: Arthropoda
- Class: Insecta
- Order: Lepidoptera
- Superfamily: Noctuoidea
- Family: Erebidae
- Genus: Melipotis
- Species: M. euryphaea

Binomial name
- Melipotis euryphaea (Hampson, 1926)

Synonyms
- Gerespa euryphaea Hampson, 1926

Species of moth

Melipotis euryphaea is a species of moth in the family Erebidae. It is found in Belize.
