= Lyncestis (moth) =

Scientific classification
- Kingdom: Animalia
- Phylum: Arthropoda
- Class: Insecta
- Order: Lepidoptera
- Superfamily: Noctuoidea
- Family: Erebidae
- Tribe: Ophiusini
- Genus: Lyncestis; Walker, 1857

Synonyms
- Jarasana Moore, 1882

Genus of moths

Lyncestis is a genus of moths of the family Noctuidae.

== Species ==
- Lyncestis albisigna Wileman & South, 1920
- Lyncestis amphix (Cramer, 1777)
- Lyncestis dargei Hacker & Fibiger, 2006
- Lyncestis diascota Hampson, 1916
- Lyncestis grandidieri Viette, 1968
- Lyncestis knudlarseni Hacker & Fibiger, 2006
- Lyncestis kruegeri Hacker & Fibiger, 2006
- Lyncestis mahagonica Saalmüller, 1891
- Lyncestis melanoschista (Meyrick, 1897)
- Lyncestis metaleuca Hampson, 1896
- Lyncestis mimica Gaede, 1939
- Lyncestis phaeocrossa Turner, 1932
- Lyncestis subsignata (Walker, 1865)
- Lyncestis unilinea (Swinhoe, 1885)
- Lyncestis voeltzkowi Viette, 1965
