= Melipotis agrotoides =

Scientific classification
- Kingdom: Animalia
- Phylum: Arthropoda
- Class: Insecta
- Order: Lepidoptera
- Superfamily: Noctuoidea
- Family: Erebidae
- Genus: Melipotis
- Species: M. agrotoides

Binomial name
- Melipotis agrotoides (Walker, 1858)

Synonyms
- Bolina agrotoides Walker, 1858; Bolina agrotipennis Harvey, 1875

Species of moth

Melipotis agrotoides is a species of moth in the family Erebidae. It is found in Jamaica, Venezuela, Mexico (Yucatán, Mérida), El Salvador and the southern United States, where it has been recorded in California, Arizona and Texas.

The wingspan is about 47 mm for males and 48 mm for females. Adult males have a large square shaped pale patch on the basal part of the forewings. There is a black band on the hindwings that terminates before the anal angle.
