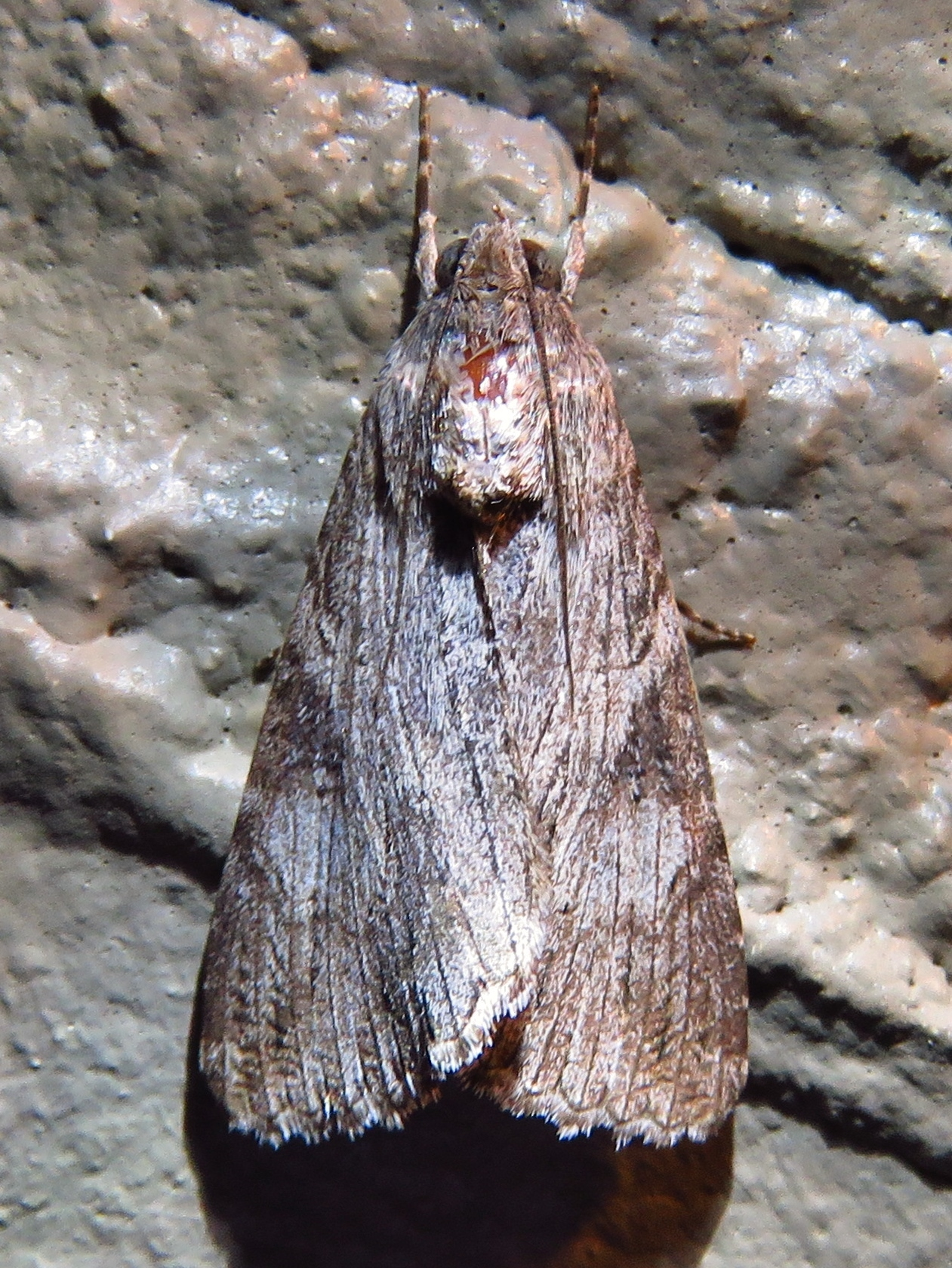

Scientific classification
- Kingdom: Animalia
- Phylum: Arthropoda
- Clade: Pancrustacea
- Class: Insecta
- Order: Lepidoptera
- Superfamily: Noctuoidea
- Family: Erebidae
- Genus: Melipotis
- Species: M. acontioides

Binomial name
- Melipotis acontioides (Guenée, 1852)

Synonyms
- Bolina acontioides Guenée, 1852; Lyncestis acontioides; Stictoptera penicillum Herrich-Schäffer, 1868; Nagara penicillum; Melipotis sinualis Harvey, 1877

= Melipotis acontioides =

Species of moth

Melipotis acontioides, the royal poinciana moth, is a species of moth in the family Erebidae. It was first described by Achille Guenée in 1852. The species is found from the southern United States (including California, Arizona, New Mexico, Texas and Florida) through Mexico and Central America to Brazil, Argentina and the Galápagos Islands. It is also found in the Caribbean, including Cuba and the British Virgin Islands, Jamaica and Puerto Rico.

The wingspan is about 43 mm.

The larvae feed on Delonix regia and Parkinsonia aculeata and Parkinsonia florida. The larvae feed at night.

== Subspecies ==
- Melipotis acontioides acontioides
- Melipotis acontioides producta Hayes, 1975 (Galápagos Islands)
