= Melipotis decreta =

Scientific classification
- Kingdom: Animalia
- Phylum: Arthropoda
- Class: Insecta
- Order: Lepidoptera
- Superfamily: Noctuoidea
- Family: Erebidae
- Genus: Melipotis
- Species: M. decreta

Binomial name
- Melipotis decreta (Walker, 1858)

Synonyms
- Bolina decreta Walker, 1858

Species of moth

Melipotis decreta is a species of moth in the family Erebidae. It is found in Mexico (Sonora, Veracruz) and Honduras.
