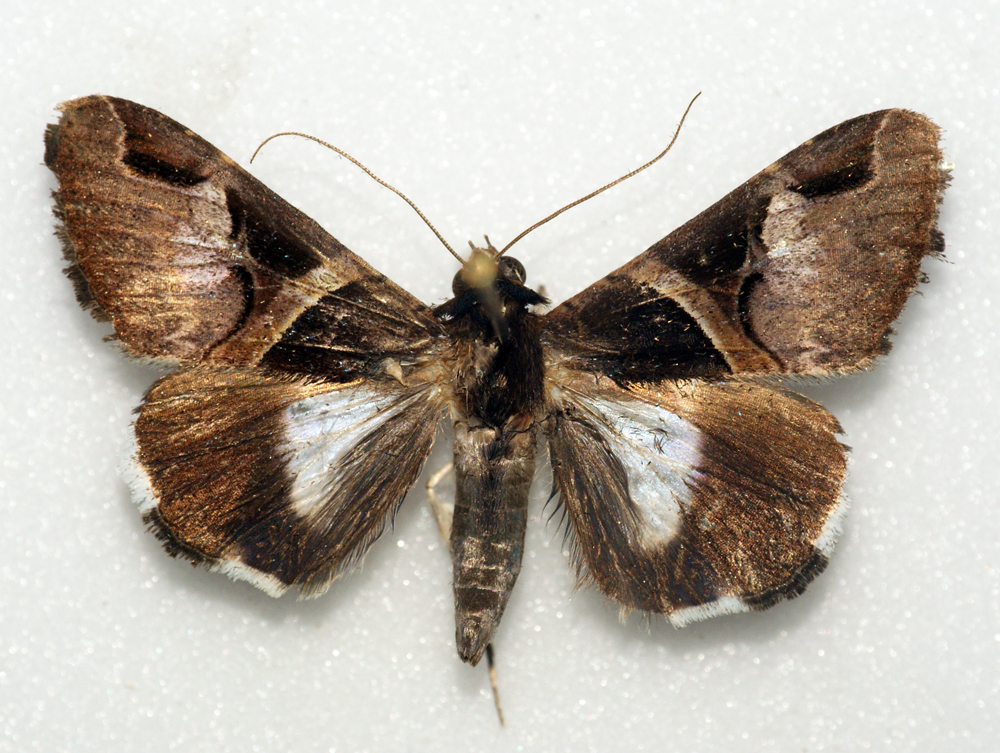

Scientific classification
- Kingdom: Animalia
- Phylum: Arthropoda
- Clade: Pancrustacea
- Class: Insecta
- Order: Lepidoptera
- Superfamily: Noctuoidea
- Family: Erebidae
- Genus: Melipotis
- Species: M. fasciolaris

Binomial name
- Melipotis fasciolaris (Hübner, [1831])

Synonyms
- Aedia fasciolaris Hübner, [1831]; Bolina cunearis Guenee, 1852; Bolina fuscaris Guenee, 1852; Bolina illuminans Walker, 1858; Bolina limitaris Guenee, 1852

= Melipotis fasciolaris =

Species of moth

Melipotis fasciolaris, the fasciolated melipotis or bewitching melipotis, is a species of moth in the family Erebidae. It is found from Georgia and Florida west through Texas to California, south through Central America and the Caribbean to Uruguay.

The wingspan is 33–43 mm (1.3–1.7 in).

The larvae feed on the leaves of Prosopis species. Adults are a pollinator of fetterbush lyonia.
