= Melipotis comprehendens =

Scientific classification
- Kingdom: Animalia
- Phylum: Arthropoda
- Class: Insecta
- Order: Lepidoptera
- Superfamily: Noctuoidea
- Family: Erebidae
- Genus: Melipotis
- Species: M. comprehendens

Binomial name
- Melipotis comprehendens (Walker, 1858)

Synonyms
- Bolina comprehendens Walker, 1858

Species of moth

Melipotis comprehendens is a species of moth in the family Erebidae. It is found from Mexico (Yucatán, Mérida) and Guatemala to Brazil.
