= Melipotis dispar =

Scientific classification
- Domain: Eukaryota
- Kingdom: Animalia
- Phylum: Arthropoda
- Class: Insecta
- Order: Lepidoptera
- Superfamily: Noctuoidea
- Family: Erebidae
- Genus: Melipotis
- Species: M. dispar

Binomial name
- Melipotis dispar (Köhler, 1979)

Synonyms
- Leucanitis dispar Köhler, 1979

Species of moth

Melipotis dispar is a species of moth in the family Erebidae. It is found in Argentina.
