= Melipotis asinus =

Scientific classification
- Domain: Eukaryota
- Kingdom: Animalia
- Phylum: Arthropoda
- Class: Insecta
- Order: Lepidoptera
- Superfamily: Noctuoidea
- Family: Erebidae
- Genus: Melipotis
- Species: M. asinus

Binomial name
- Melipotis asinus Dognin, 1912

Species of moth

Melipotis asinus is a species of moth in the family Erebidae. It is found in Argentina.
