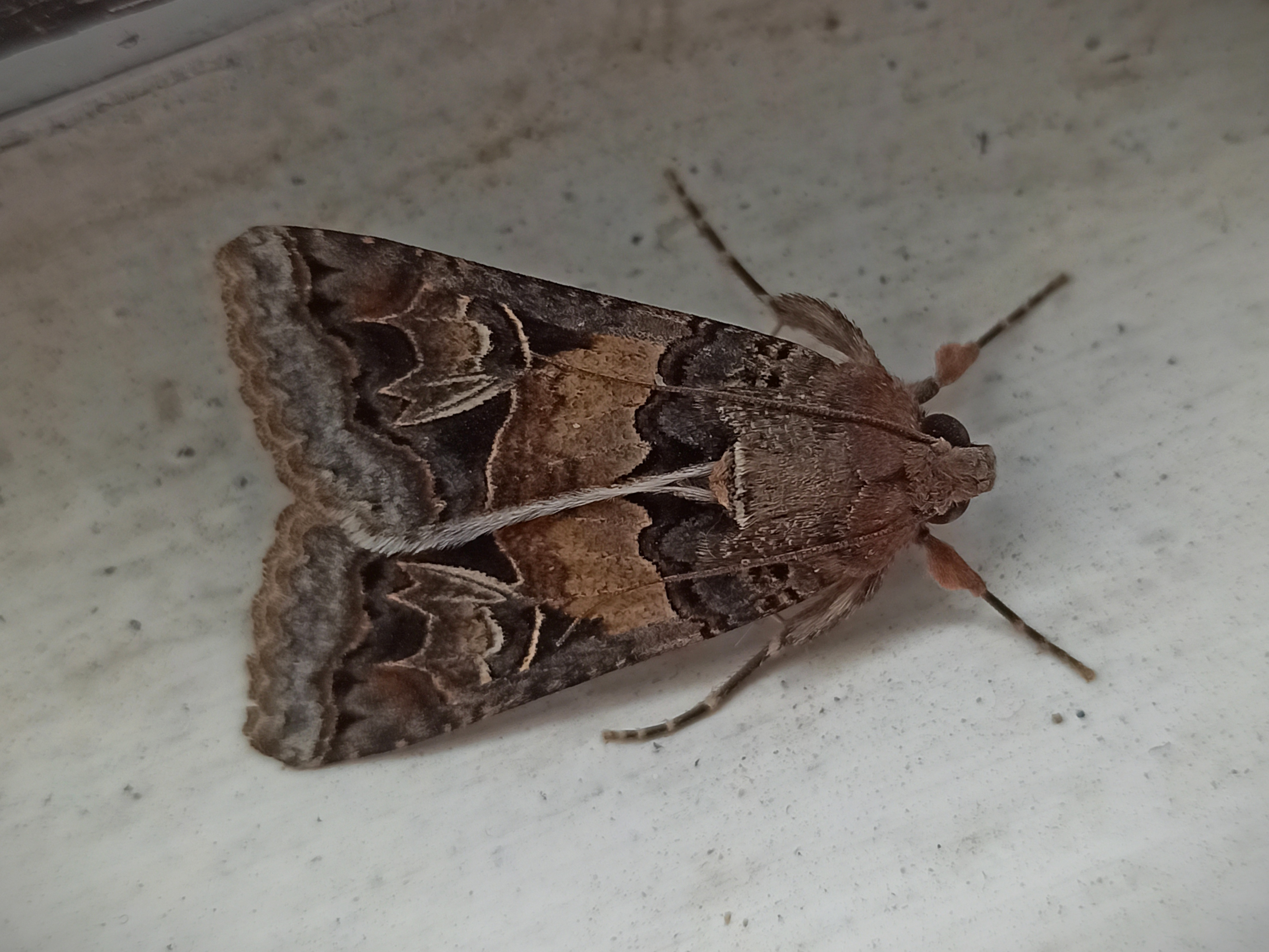

Scientific classification
- Kingdom: Animalia
- Phylum: Arthropoda
- Class: Insecta
- Order: Lepidoptera
- Superfamily: Noctuoidea
- Family: Erebidae
- Genus: Melipotis
- Species: M. novanda

Binomial name
- Melipotis novanda (Guenee, 1852)

Synonyms
- Melipotis agrotipennis (Harvey, 1875)

= Melipotis novanda =

Species of moth

Melipotis novanda is an owlet moth in the family Erebidae first described by Achille Guenée in 1852. It is found in North America.

The MONA or Hodges number for Melipotis novanda is 8609.
