= Lyncestis albisigna =

Scientific classification
- Kingdom: Animalia
- Phylum: Arthropoda
- Class: Insecta
- Order: Lepidoptera
- Superfamily: Noctuoidea
- Family: Erebidae
- Genus: Lyncestis
- Species: L. albisigna

Binomial name
- Lyncestis albisigna Wileman & South, 1920

Synonyms
- Melipotis albisigna

Species of moth

Lyncestis albisigna is a species of moth in the family Erebidae. It is found in the Philippines (Luzon, Mindanao).
