= Salbia sciagraphalis =

Scientific classification
- Kingdom: Animalia
- Phylum: Arthropoda
- Class: Insecta
- Order: Lepidoptera
- Family: Crambidae
- Genus: Salbia
- Species: S. sciagraphalis

Binomial name
- Salbia sciagraphalis (Dyar, 1914)

Synonyms
- Syngamia sciagraphalis Dyar, 1914

Species of moth

Salbia sciagraphalis is a moth in the family Crambidae. It was described by Harrison Gray Dyar Jr. in 1914. It is found in Panama.

The wingspan is about 15 mm. Adults are similar to Salbia abnormalis, but are tinged with ocher, especially along inner margin and the costa of the males is straight, without swelling. Furthermore, the lines of the hindwings are not quite as coarse and rigid as in S. abnormalis and the whitish bordering shades are less contrasting.
