= Salbia endolasea =

Scientific classification
- Kingdom: Animalia
- Phylum: Arthropoda
- Class: Insecta
- Order: Lepidoptera
- Family: Crambidae
- Genus: Salbia
- Species: S. endolasea

Binomial name
- Salbia endolasea (Hampson, 1912)

Synonyms
- Syngamia endolasea Hampson, 1912

Species of moth

Salbia endolasea is a moth in the family Crambidae. It was described by George Hampson in 1912. It is found on St. Vincent.

The forewings are whitish, suffused with brown especially on the costal and terminal areas. There is a subbasal black point below the costa and an antemedial black spot below the costa with slight curved line from it to the inner margin, as well as a black discoidal spot. The postmedial line is black and there is a blackish terminal hue. The hindwings are whitish suffused with brown, especially on the terminal area. There is a black discoidal point and the postmedial line is brown defined on each side by white. There is a blackish spot at the inner margin near the tornus and a blackish terminal line, defined on the inner side by white towards the tornus.
