= Salbia =

Scientific classification
- Kingdom: Animalia
- Phylum: Arthropoda
- Class: Insecta
- Order: Lepidoptera
- Family: Crambidae
- Subfamily: Spilomelinae
- Genus: Salbia; Guenée, 1854

Synonyms
- Salbiomorpha Snellen, 1875

Genus of moths

Salbia is a genus of moths of the family Crambidae described by Achille Guenée in 1854.

== Species ==
- Salbia abnormalis
- Salbia ancidalis (Snellen, 1875)
- Salbia cassidalis Guenée, 1854
- Salbia cognatalis
- Salbia deformalis
- Salbia ecphaea (Hampson, 1912)
- Salbia endolasea (Hampson, 1912)
- Salbia extensalis Dognin, 1911
- Salbia flabellalis
- Salbia grisealis (Hampson, 1918)
- Salbia haemorrhoidalis Guenée, 1854
- Salbia illectalis Walker, 1859
- Salbia interruptalis (Amsel, 1956)
- Salbia lenalis Walker, 1859
- Salbia lophoceralis
- Salbia lotanalis Druce, 1899
- Salbia melanobathrum (Dyar, 1914)
- Salbia melanolopha
- Salbia midalis (Schaus, 1924)
- Salbia minimalis (Amsel, 1956)
- Salbia mizaralis (Druce, 1899)
- Salbia munroealis
- Salbia nebulosalis
- Salbia pachyceralis (Hampson, 1917)
- Salbia pepitalis (Guenée, 1854)
- Salbia plicata (Hampson, 1912)
- Salbia sciagraphalis (Dyar, 1914)
- Salbia seriopunctalis (Hampson, 1895)
- Salbia subnebulosalis
- Salbia thyrsonoma
- Salbia torsalis
- Salbia tremulalis (Druce, 1899)
- Salbia tytiusalis (Walker, 1859)
- Salbia varanalis (Schaus, 1940)
- Salbia zena (Druce, 1902)
