= Salbia tytiusalis =

Scientific classification
- Kingdom: Animalia
- Phylum: Arthropoda
- Class: Insecta
- Order: Lepidoptera
- Family: Crambidae
- Genus: Salbia
- Species: S. tytiusalis

Binomial name
- Salbia tytiusalis (Walker, 1859)

Synonyms
- Botys tytiusalis Walker, 1859; Anania tytiusalis; Marasmia tytiusalis; Isosalbia tytiusalis

Species of moth

Salbia tytiusalis is a moth in the family Crambidae. It was described by Francis Walker in 1859. It is found in Florida, the West Indies and Central America, including Honduras.

Adults are pale cinereous (ash gray), with iridescent, semihyaline (almost glass-like) wings. They are somewhat darker along the costa and beyond the exterior line. There is a lunulate reniform mark on the forewings, as well as a slightly curved, dentate exterior line and marginal black points. Adults have been recorded on wing from March to December.
