= Salbia lophoceralis =

Scientific classification
- Kingdom: Animalia
- Phylum: Arthropoda
- Class: Insecta
- Order: Lepidoptera
- Family: Crambidae
- Genus: Salbia
- Species: S. lophoceralis

Binomial name
- Salbia lophoceralis (Hampson, 1917)

Synonyms
- Syngamia lophoceralis Hampson, 1917

Species of moth

Salbia lophoceralis is a moth in the family Crambidae. It is found in Peru.
