= Salbia mizaralis =

Scientific classification
- Kingdom: Animalia
- Phylum: Arthropoda
- Class: Insecta
- Order: Lepidoptera
- Family: Crambidae
- Genus: Salbia
- Species: S. mizaralis

Binomial name
- Salbia mizaralis (H. Druce, 1899)

Synonyms
- Hedylepta mizaralis H. Druce, 1899

Species of moth

Salbia mizaralis is a moth in the family Crambidae. It was described by Herbert Druce in 1899. It is found in Panama and Florida.
