= Salbia tremulalis =

Scientific classification
- Kingdom: Animalia
- Phylum: Arthropoda
- Class: Insecta
- Order: Lepidoptera
- Family: Crambidae
- Genus: Salbia
- Species: S. tremulalis

Binomial name
- Salbia tremulalis (H. Druce, 1899)

Synonyms
- Syngamia tremulalis H. Druce, 1899

Species of moth

Salbia tremulalis is a moth in the family Crambidae. It was described by Herbert Druce in 1899. It is found in Orizaba, Mexico.

The forewings and hindwings are pale brownish fawn, both wings crossed from the costal to the inner margin by two darker brown fine zigzag lines. The first near the base, the second beyond the middle. There is a marginal black line and the forewings have a small brown spot at the end of the cell.
