= Salbia munroealis =

Scientific classification
- Kingdom: Animalia
- Phylum: Arthropoda
- Class: Insecta
- Order: Lepidoptera
- Family: Crambidae
- Genus: Salbia
- Species: S. munroealis

Binomial name
- Salbia munroealis (Amsel, 1956)

Synonyms
- Salbiomorpha munroealis Amsel, 1956

Species of moth

Salbia munroealis is a moth in the family Crambidae. It is found in Venezuela.
