= Salbia midalis =

Scientific classification
- Kingdom: Animalia
- Phylum: Arthropoda
- Class: Insecta
- Order: Lepidoptera
- Family: Crambidae
- Genus: Salbia
- Species: S. midalis

Binomial name
- Salbia midalis (Schaus, 1924)

Synonyms
- Stenia midalis Schaus, 1924

Species of moth

Salbia midalis is a moth in the family Crambidae. It was described by William Schaus in 1924. It is found in Ecuador.

The wingspan is about 21 mm. The forewings have fine fuscous lines. There is a vertical subbasal line a wavy antemedial line, a streak on the discocellular and a wavily dentate postmedial line. There are fuscous spots in the terminal area. The hindwings have a streak on the discocellular. The postmedial line is incurved below vein 2 and downbent to the inner margin close to the anal angle. There is a fuscous terminal line.
