= Salbia seriopunctalis =

Scientific classification
- Kingdom: Animalia
- Phylum: Arthropoda
- Class: Insecta
- Order: Lepidoptera
- Family: Crambidae
- Genus: Salbia
- Species: S. seriopunctalis

Binomial name
- Salbia seriopunctalis (Hampson, 1895)

Synonyms
- Pionea seriopunctalis Hampson, 1895

Species of moth

Salbia seriopunctalis is a moth in the family Crambidae. It was described by George Hampson in 1895. It is found in Grenada.

The wingspan is about 16 mm. Adults are ochreous brown, slightly suffused with fuscous. The forewings have an antemedial series of three dark specks, a discocellular speck with a black spot below it at the lower angle of the cell and a postmedial slightly curved series of specks on the veins. The hindwings have a discocellular speck and a postmedial series of specks. Both wings have a marginal brown line and a line at the base of the cilia.
