= Salbia ancidalis =

Scientific classification
- Kingdom: Animalia
- Phylum: Arthropoda
- Class: Insecta
- Order: Lepidoptera
- Family: Crambidae
- Genus: Salbia
- Species: S. ancidalis

Binomial name
- Salbia ancidalis (Snellen, 1875)

Synonyms
- Salbiomorpha ancidalis Snellen, 1875

Species of moth

Salbia ancidalis is a moth in the family Crambidae. It was described by Snellen in 1875. It is found in Colombia.
