= Salbia lenalis =

Scientific classification
- Kingdom: Animalia
- Phylum: Arthropoda
- Class: Insecta
- Order: Lepidoptera
- Family: Crambidae
- Genus: Salbia
- Species: S. lenalis

Binomial name
- Salbia lenalis Walker, 1859

Species of moth

Salbia lenalis is a moth in the family Crambidae. It was described by Francis Walker in 1859. It is found on Borneo.
