= Salbia pepitalis =

Scientific classification
- Kingdom: Animalia
- Phylum: Arthropoda
- Class: Insecta
- Order: Lepidoptera
- Family: Crambidae
- Genus: Salbia
- Species: S. pepitalis

Binomial name
- Salbia pepitalis (Guenée, 1854)

Synonyms
- Syngamia pepitalis Guenée, 1854; Botys collaris C. Felder, R. Felder & Rogenhofer, 1875

Species of moth

Salbia pepitalis is a moth in the family Crambidae. It was described by Achille Guenée in 1854. It is found in French Guiana, Colombia and Honduras.
