= Salbia grisealis =

Scientific classification
- Kingdom: Animalia
- Phylum: Arthropoda
- Class: Insecta
- Order: Lepidoptera
- Family: Crambidae
- Genus: Salbia
- Species: S. grisealis

Binomial name
- Salbia grisealis (Hampson, 1918)

Synonyms
- Sylepta grisealis Hampson, 1918

Species of moth

Salbia grisealis is a moth in the family Crambidae. It was described by George Hampson in 1918. It is found in Peru.

The wingspan is about 32 mm. The forewings are grey, tinged with brown. There is a slightly curved blackish antemedial line, a narrow black discoidal lunule and a blackish postmedial line. The hindwings are grey, tinged with brown. There is an oblique black discoidal bar and a blackish postmedial line.
