= Salbia extensalis =

Scientific classification
- Kingdom: Animalia
- Phylum: Arthropoda
- Class: Insecta
- Order: Lepidoptera
- Family: Crambidae
- Genus: Salbia
- Species: S. extensalis

Binomial name
- Salbia extensalis Dognin, 1911

Species of moth

Salbia extensalis is a moth in the family Crambidae. It was described by Paul Dognin in 1911. It is found in Colombia.
