= Salbia nebulosalis =

Scientific classification
- Kingdom: Animalia
- Phylum: Arthropoda
- Class: Insecta
- Order: Lepidoptera
- Family: Crambidae
- Genus: Salbia
- Species: S. nebulosalis

Binomial name
- Salbia nebulosalis (Schaus, 1912)

Synonyms
- Syngamia nebulosalis Schaus, 1912

Species of moth

Salbia nebulosalis is a moth in the family Crambidae. It is found in Costa Rica.

The wingspan is about 21 mm. The wings are whitish, with fuscous brown lines. The forewings are thinly clouded with brown and the base is shaded with brown. There is a slightly curved antemedial line, outwardly shaded with brown and there is a line on the discocellular, as well as a medial line from vein 2 to the inner margin. The postmedial line is slightly incurved from the costa to vein 6, and from 6 to 2, where it is slightly upbent towards the discocellular. The outer margin is broadly fuscous brown, expanding below vein 2 to the inner margin. The hindwings have an antemedial shade and a spot at the end of the cell and a medial line from below the cell to the inner margin. The postmedial line expands from vein 2 to the anal angle and there is a subterminal broken line from a large apical space to the postmedial at vein 2. The terminal line does not reach the anal angle.
