= Salbia varanalis =

Scientific classification
- Kingdom: Animalia
- Phylum: Arthropoda
- Class: Insecta
- Order: Lepidoptera
- Family: Crambidae
- Genus: Salbia
- Species: S. varanalis

Binomial name
- Salbia varanalis (Schaus, 1940)

Synonyms
- Syngamia varanalis Schaus, 1940

Species of moth

Salbia varanalis is a moth in the family Crambidae. It was described by Schaus in 1940. It is found in Puerto Rico.
