= Salbia plicata =

Scientific classification
- Kingdom: Animalia
- Phylum: Arthropoda
- Class: Insecta
- Order: Lepidoptera
- Family: Crambidae
- Genus: Salbia
- Species: S. plicata

Binomial name
- Salbia plicata (Hampson, 1912)

Synonyms
- Syngamia plicata Hampson, 1912

Species of moth

Salbia plicata is a moth in the family Crambidae. It was described by George Hampson in 1912. It is found in Brazil.
