= Salbia illectalis =

Scientific classification
- Kingdom: Animalia
- Phylum: Arthropoda
- Class: Insecta
- Order: Lepidoptera
- Family: Crambidae
- Genus: Salbia
- Species: S. illectalis

Binomial name
- Salbia illectalis Walker, 1859

Species of moth

Salbia illectalis is a moth in the family Crambidae. It was described by Francis Walker in 1859. It is found on Borneo.
