= Salbia melanobathrum =

Scientific classification
- Kingdom: Animalia
- Phylum: Arthropoda
- Class: Insecta
- Order: Lepidoptera
- Family: Crambidae
- Genus: Salbia
- Species: S. melanobathrum

Binomial name
- Salbia melanobathrum (Dyar, 1914)

Synonyms
- Syngamia melanobathrum Dyar, 1914

Species of moth

Salbia melanobathrum is a moth in the family Crambidae. It was described by Harrison Gray Dyar Jr. in 1914. It is found in Panama.

The wingspan is about 13 mm. Adults are uniform straw yellow.
