= Salbia melanolopha =

Scientific classification
- Kingdom: Animalia
- Phylum: Arthropoda
- Class: Insecta
- Order: Lepidoptera
- Family: Crambidae
- Genus: Salbia
- Species: S. melanolopha

Binomial name
- Salbia melanolopha (Hampson, 1917)

Synonyms
- Syngamia melanolopha Hampson, 1917

Species of moth

Salbia melanolopha is a moth in the family Crambidae. It is found in Ecuador.
