= Salbia thyrsonoma =

Scientific classification
- Kingdom: Animalia
- Phylum: Arthropoda
- Class: Insecta
- Order: Lepidoptera
- Family: Crambidae
- Genus: Salbia
- Species: S. thyrsonoma

Binomial name
- Salbia thyrsonoma (Meyrick, 1936)

Synonyms
- Crocidophora thyrsonoma Meyrick, 1936

Species of moth

Salbia thyrsonoma is a moth in the family Crambidae. It is found in Bolivia.
