= Salbia cassidalis =

Scientific classification
- Kingdom: Animalia
- Phylum: Arthropoda
- Class: Insecta
- Order: Lepidoptera
- Family: Crambidae
- Genus: Salbia
- Species: S. cassidalis

Binomial name
- Salbia cassidalis (Guenée, 1854)

Synonyms
- Syngamia cassidalis Guenée, 1854; Salbia pellucidalis Warren, 1889; Syngamia praeformatalis Möschler, 1890; Syngamia squamosalis Wallengren, 1860

Species of moth

Salbia cassidalis is a moth in the family Crambidae. It was described by Achille Guenée in 1854. It is found in Brazil, Ecuador, Puerto Rico, Cuba, Jamaica, Costa Rica, Panama and Mexico.
