= Salbia zena =

Scientific classification
- Kingdom: Animalia
- Phylum: Arthropoda
- Class: Insecta
- Order: Lepidoptera
- Family: Crambidae
- Genus: Salbia
- Species: S. zena

Binomial name
- Salbia zena (H. Druce, 1902)

Synonyms
- Syngamia zena H. Druce, 1902

Species of moth

Salbia zena is a moth in the family Crambidae. It was described by Herbert Druce in 1902. It is found in Colombia and Costa Rica.

The forewings are purplish brown, with a large oval-shaped spot just beyond the cell. On the inner side of the large spot are two very small yellow dots. The hindwings are hyaline yellow, broadly bordered from the apex to the anal angle with dark purplish brown. There is a small brown dot at the end of the cell.
