= Salbia subnebulosalis =

Scientific classification
- Kingdom: Animalia
- Phylum: Arthropoda
- Class: Insecta
- Order: Lepidoptera
- Family: Crambidae
- Genus: Salbia
- Species: S. subnebulosalis

Binomial name
- Salbia subnebulosalis (Dyar, 1918)

Synonyms
- Syngamia subnebulosalis Dyar, 1918

Species of moth

Salbia subnebulosalis is a moth in the family Crambidae. It is found in Mexico (Morelos).

The wingspan is about 16 mm. The forewings are grey-brown with a blackish inner line which is angled on the median vein. The discal mark has the form of an oblique bar. The outer line is curved and runs from the costa to vein 2. It is black and white-edged, preceded by white between the radial nervules and dislocated to a point under the reniform and continued obliquely to the inner margin. The hindwings are grey-brown, with a thick black line from the end of the cell obliquely to the inner margin. It is followed by white below vein 3 and there is another outer bar from the costa at the outer third to the anal angle, followed by white from the costa to vein 3. The terminal line is black.
