= Salbia torsalis =

Scientific classification
- Kingdom: Animalia
- Phylum: Arthropoda
- Class: Insecta
- Order: Lepidoptera
- Family: Crambidae
- Genus: Salbia
- Species: S. torsalis

Binomial name
- Salbia torsalis Guenée, 1854

Species of moth

Salbia torsalis is a moth in the family Crambidae. It is found in French Guiana.
