= Salbia ecphaea =

Scientific classification
- Kingdom: Animalia
- Phylum: Arthropoda
- Class: Insecta
- Order: Lepidoptera
- Family: Crambidae
- Genus: Salbia
- Species: S. ecphaea

Binomial name
- Salbia ecphaea (Hampson, 1912)

Synonyms
- Syngamia ecphaea Hampson, 1912

Species of moth

Salbia ecphaea is a moth in the family Crambidae. It was described by George Hampson in 1912. It is found in Colombia.

The wingspan is about 26 mm. The forewings are whitish, clouded in parts with fuscous brown. The terminal area is black-brown with a whitish subapical patch and a curved blackish antemedial line. There is a blackish discoidal striga and the postmedial line is blackish, with a black spot at the costa and defined on the outer side by whitish. There is a blackish terminal line and a fine whitish line at the base of the cilia. The hindwings are whitish, tinged with brown. There is a black discoidal point and a blackish shade beyond the cell and from the lower angle to the inner margin before the blackish postmedial line. There is also a fuscous subterminal shade and a blackish terminal line.
