= Salbia lotanalis =

Scientific classification
- Kingdom: Animalia
- Phylum: Arthropoda
- Class: Insecta
- Order: Lepidoptera
- Family: Crambidae
- Genus: Salbia
- Species: S. lotanalis

Binomial name
- Salbia lotanalis H. Druce, 1899

Species of moth

Salbia lotanalis is a moth in the family Crambidae. It was described by Herbert Druce in 1899. It is found in Costa Rica.

The larvae feed on Miconia calvescens. They roll the leaves of their host plant, forming a tube from which they feed. Pupation takes place within this tube.
