= Salbia interruptalis =

Scientific classification
- Kingdom: Animalia
- Phylum: Arthropoda
- Class: Insecta
- Order: Lepidoptera
- Family: Crambidae
- Genus: Salbia
- Species: S. interruptalis

Binomial name
- Salbia interruptalis (Amsel, 1956)

Synonyms
- Salbiomorpha interruptalis Amsel, 1956

Species of moth

Salbia interruptalis is a moth in the family Crambidae. It was described by Hans Georg Amsel in 1956 and is found in Venezuela.
