= Salbia pachyceralis =

Scientific classification
- Kingdom: Animalia
- Phylum: Arthropoda
- Class: Insecta
- Order: Lepidoptera
- Family: Crambidae
- Genus: Salbia
- Species: S. pachyceralis

Binomial name
- Salbia pachyceralis (Hampson, 1917)

Synonyms
- Syngamia pachyceralis Hampson, 1917

Species of moth

Salbia pachyceralis is a moth in the family Crambidae. It was described by George Hampson in 1917. It is found in Panama.

The wingspan is about 20 mm. The forewings are pale brown, the area below the cell from before the antemedial to beyond the postmedial line white, faintly tinged with brown. There is some dark brown at the base and there is a curved blackish antemedial line forming a minute spot at the costa. There is also a black discoidal bar and a postmedial blackish line, defined on the outer side by white, forming a minute black spot at the costa. The terminal line is blackish. The hindwings are white to beyond the postmedial line. The terminal area is pale ochreous brown and there is a black discoidal point, as well as a fine black postmedial line and a dark terminal line and diffused blackish mark at the tornus.
