= Salbia abnormalis =

Scientific classification
- Kingdom: Animalia
- Phylum: Arthropoda
- Class: Insecta
- Order: Lepidoptera
- Family: Crambidae
- Genus: Salbia
- Species: S. abnormalis

Binomial name
- Salbia abnormalis Snellen, 1875

Species of moth

Salbia abnormalis is a moth in the family Crambidae. It is found in Colombia.
