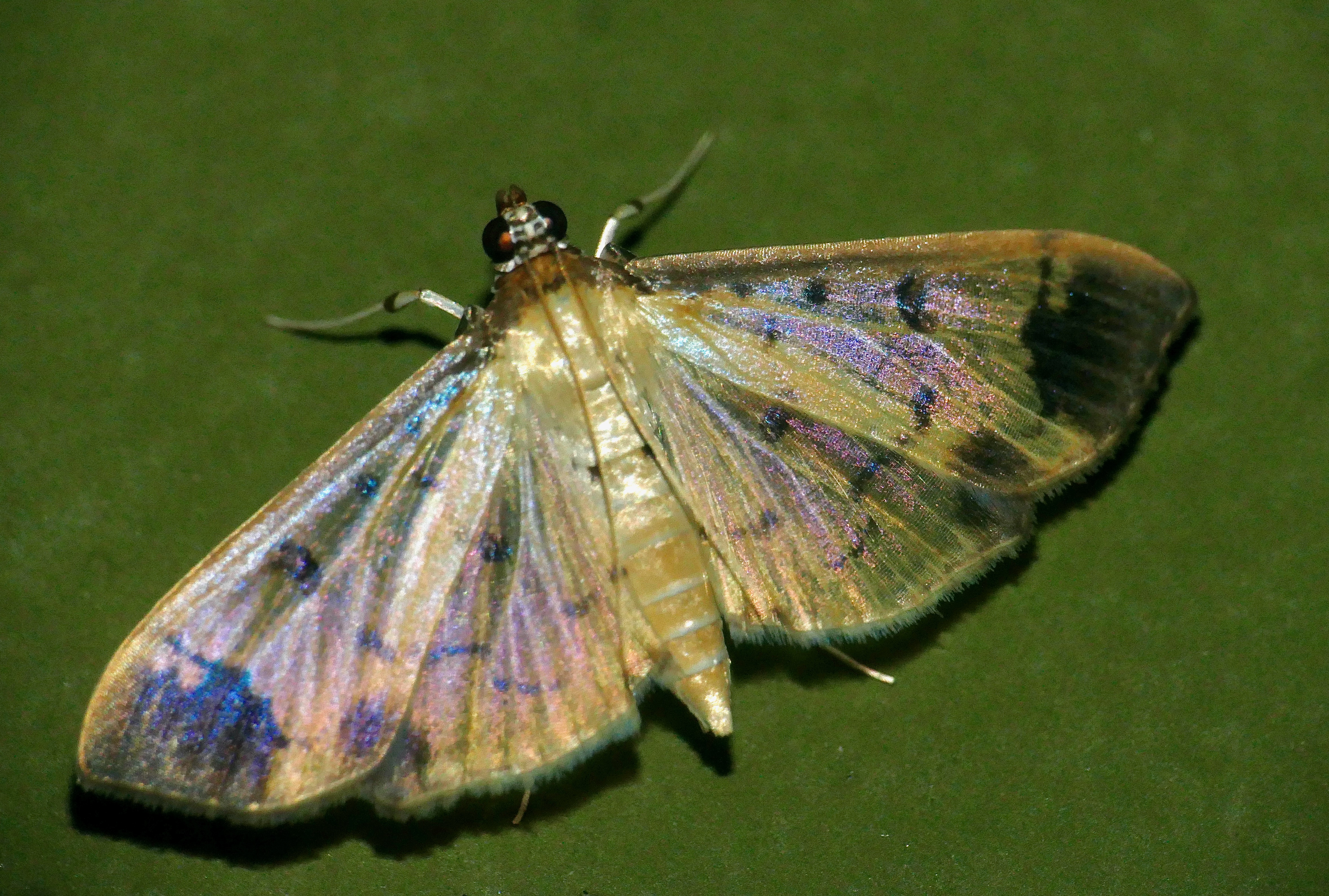

Scientific classification
- Kingdom: Animalia
- Phylum: Arthropoda
- Clade: Pancrustacea
- Class: Insecta
- Order: Lepidoptera
- Family: Crambidae
- Genus: Eulepte
- Species: E. concordalis

Binomial name
- Eulepte concordalis Hübner, 1825

Synonyms
- Botys ogmiusalis Walker, 1859; Botys peranthusalis Walker, 1859; Phalaena socialis Sepp, 1855

= Eulepte concordalis =

Species of moth

Eulepte concordalis is a moth in the family Crambidae. It was described by Jacob Hübner in 1825. It is found in Brazil, Suriname, Panama, Costa Rica and Mexico.
