= Eulepte alialis =

Scientific classification
- Kingdom: Animalia
- Phylum: Arthropoda
- Class: Insecta
- Order: Lepidoptera
- Family: Crambidae
- Genus: Eulepte
- Species: E. alialis

Binomial name
- Eulepte alialis (Guenée, 1854)

Synonyms
- Botys alialis Guenée, 1854; Lamprosema albalis; Nacoleia allalis; Pionea subcostalis Hampson, 1913

Species of moth

Eulepte alialis is a moth in the family Crambidae. It was described by Achille Guenée in 1854. It is found in French Guiana, Peru, Costa Rica and Mexico.
