= Eulepte anticostalis =

Scientific classification
- Kingdom: Animalia
- Phylum: Arthropoda
- Class: Insecta
- Order: Lepidoptera
- Family: Crambidae
- Genus: Eulepte
- Species: E. anticostalis

Binomial name
- Eulepte anticostalis (Grote, 1871)

Synonyms
- Botis anticostalis Grote, 1871; Botis levalis Hulst, 1886

Species of moth

Eulepte anticostalis is a moth in the family Crambidae. It was described by Augustus Radcliffe Grote in 1871. It is found in North America, where it has been recorded from Florida to North Carolina and west to Texas. It is also found on Puerto Rico.

The wingspan is 25–28 mm. Adults have been recorded on wing from April to May and from July to October.
