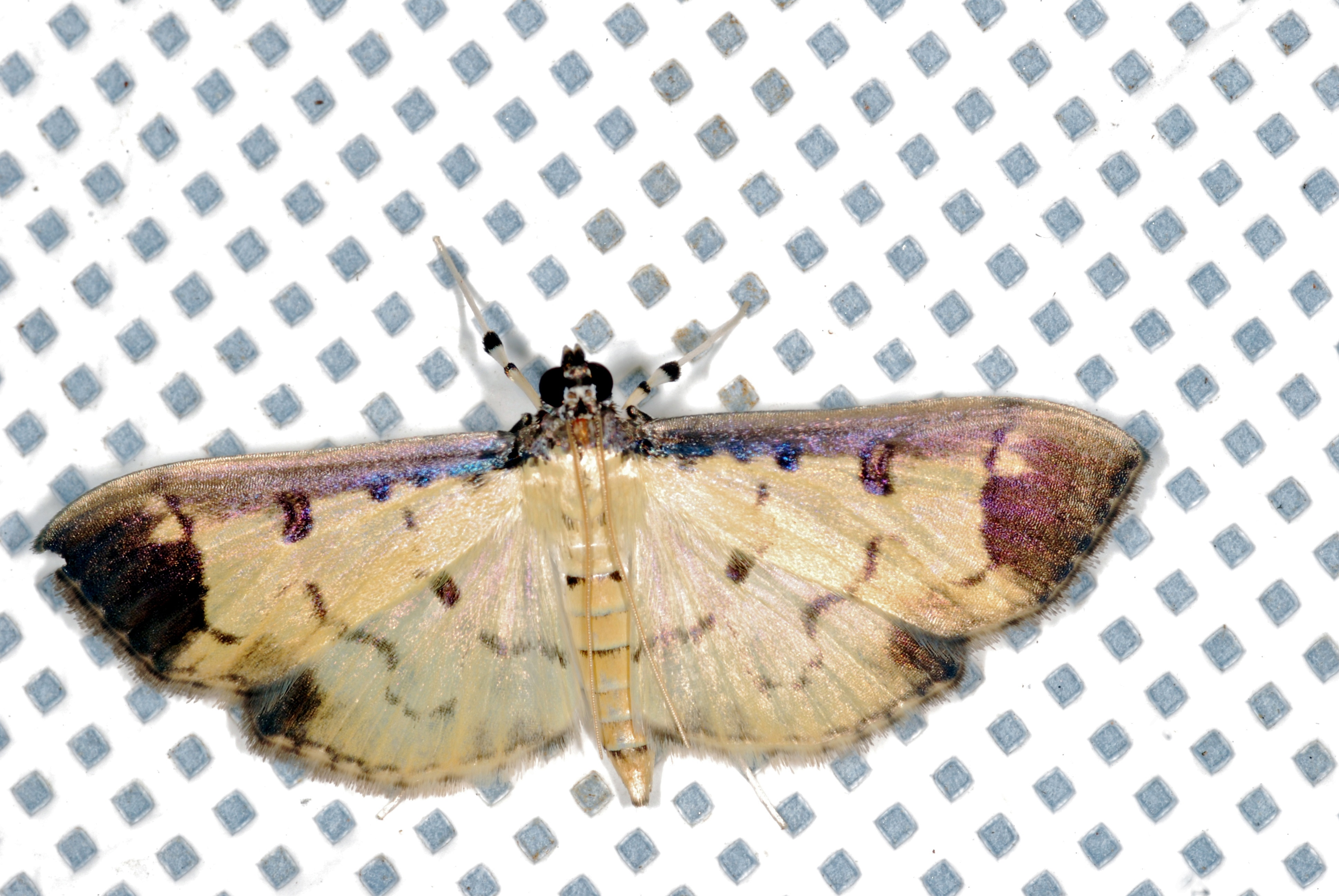
- Black Rock Lodge, San Ignacio, BELIZE

Scientific classification
- Kingdom: Animalia
- Phylum: Arthropoda
- Class: Insecta
- Order: Lepidoptera
- Family: Crambidae
- Genus: Eulepte
- Species: E. gastralis

Binomial name
- Eulepte gastralis (Guenée, 1854)

Synonyms
- Botys gastralis Guenée, 1854

= Eulepte gastralis =

Species of moth

Eulepte gastralis is a moth in the family Crambidae. It was described by Achille Guenée in 1854. It is found on Haiti.
