= Eulepte vogli =

Scientific classification
- Domain: Eukaryota
- Kingdom: Animalia
- Phylum: Arthropoda
- Class: Insecta
- Order: Lepidoptera
- Family: Crambidae
- Genus: Eulepte
- Species: E. vogli

Binomial name
- Eulepte vogli Amsel, 1956

Species of moth

Eulepte vogli is a moth in the family Crambidae. It was described by Hans Georg Amsel in 1956. It is found in Venezuela.
