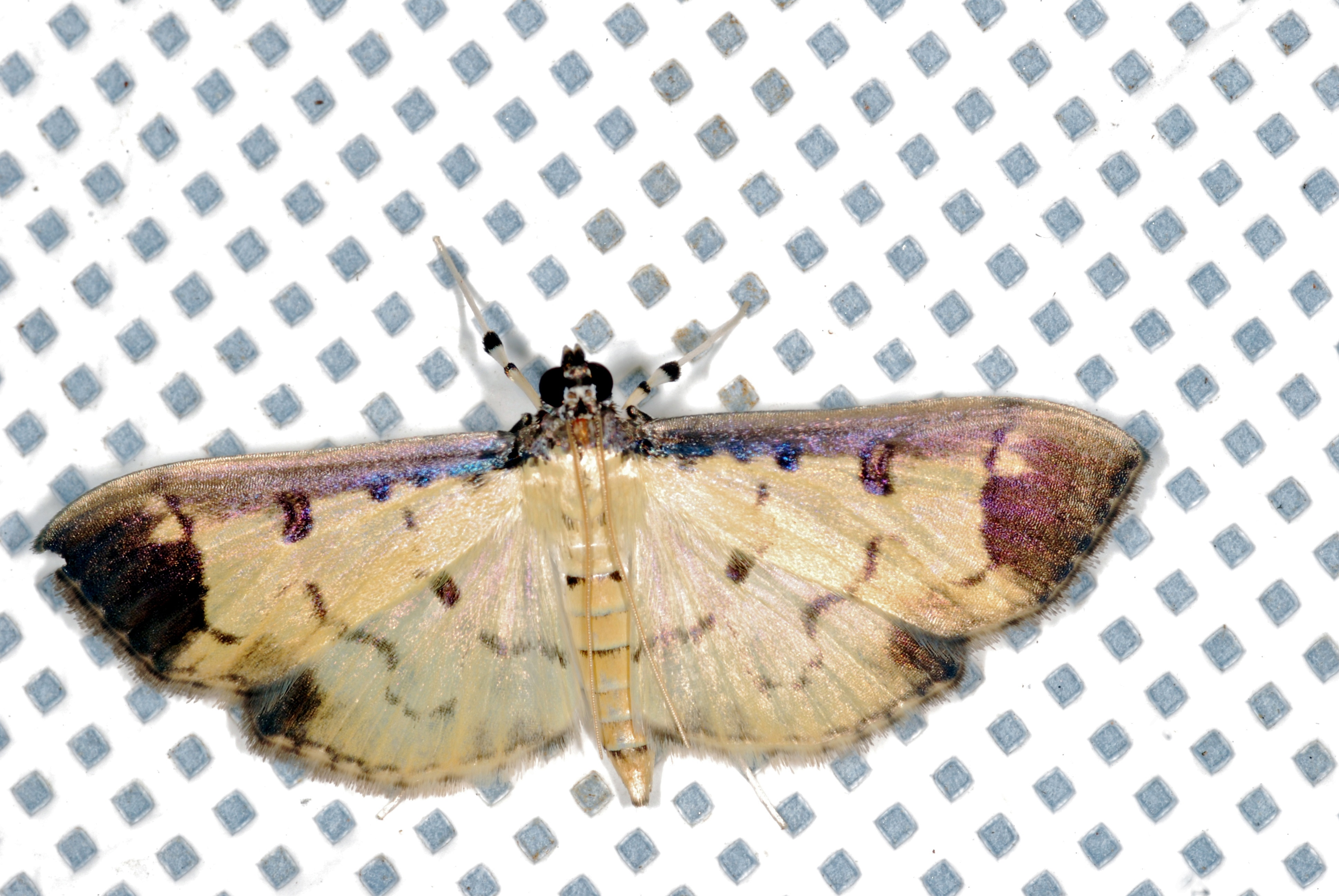
- Eulepte gastralis

Scientific classification
- Domain: Eukaryota
- Kingdom: Animalia
- Phylum: Arthropoda
- Class: Insecta
- Order: Lepidoptera
- Family: Crambidae
- Subfamily: Spilomelinae
- Genus: Eulepte; Hübner, 1825

Synonyms
- Acrospila Lederer, 1863

= Eulepte =

Genus of moths

Eulepte is a genus of moths of the family Crambidae.

== Species ==
- Eulepte alialis (Guenée, 1854)
- Eulepte anticostalis (Grote, 1871)
- Eulepte concordalis Hübner, 1825
- Eulepte gastralis (Guenée, 1854)
- Eulepte inguinalis (Guenée, 1854)
- Eulepte vogli Amsel, 1956
