= Eulepte inguinalis =

Scientific classification
- Kingdom: Animalia
- Phylum: Arthropoda
- Class: Insecta
- Order: Lepidoptera
- Family: Crambidae
- Genus: Eulepte
- Species: E. inguinalis

Binomial name
- Eulepte inguinalis (Guenée, 1854)

Synonyms
- Botys inguinalis Guenée, 1854; Botys thalloalis Walker, 1859; Pilocrocis thoasalis Hampson 1899

Species of moth

Eulepte inguinalis is a moth in the family Crambidae. It was described by Achille Guenée in 1854. It is found in Brazil, French Guiana and in Jamaica, Cuba and Puerto Rico.
