= Callisthenia angusta =

Scientific classification
- Domain: Eukaryota
- Kingdom: Animalia
- Phylum: Arthropoda
- Class: Insecta
- Order: Lepidoptera
- Superfamily: Noctuoidea
- Family: Erebidae
- Subfamily: Arctiinae
- Genus: Callisthenia
- Species: C. angusta

Binomial name
- Callisthenia angusta Schaus, 1905

Species of moth

Callisthenia angusta is a moth of the subfamily Arctiinae. It is found in French Guiana.
