= Callisthenia ruberrima =

Scientific classification
- Kingdom: Animalia
- Phylum: Arthropoda
- Clade: Pancrustacea
- Class: Insecta
- Order: Lepidoptera
- Superfamily: Noctuoidea
- Family: Erebidae
- Subfamily: Arctiinae
- Genus: Callisthenia
- Species: C. ruberrima

Binomial name
- Callisthenia ruberrima Gibeaux, 1983

Species of moth

Callisthenia ruberrima is a moth of the subfamily Arctiinae. It is found in the French Guiana.
