= Callisthenia variegata =

Scientific classification
- Kingdom: Animalia
- Phylum: Arthropoda
- Class: Insecta
- Order: Lepidoptera
- Superfamily: Noctuoidea
- Family: Erebidae
- Subfamily: Arctiinae
- Genus: Callisthenia
- Species: C. variegata

Binomial name
- Callisthenia variegata (Walker, [1865])

Synonyms
- Cisthene variegata Walker, [1865]

Species of moth

Callisthenia variegata is a moth of the subfamily Arctiinae first described by Francis Walker in 1865. It is found in the Amazon region and Peru.
