= Callisthenia schadei =

Scientific classification
- Domain: Eukaryota
- Kingdom: Animalia
- Phylum: Arthropoda
- Class: Insecta
- Order: Lepidoptera
- Superfamily: Noctuoidea
- Family: Erebidae
- Subfamily: Arctiinae
- Genus: Callisthenia
- Species: C. schadei

Binomial name
- Callisthenia schadei Schaus, 1938

Species of moth

Callisthenia schadei is a moth of the subfamily Arctiinae. It is found in Paraguay.
