= Callisthenia costilobata =

Scientific classification
- Domain: Eukaryota
- Kingdom: Animalia
- Phylum: Arthropoda
- Class: Insecta
- Order: Lepidoptera
- Superfamily: Noctuoidea
- Family: Erebidae
- Subfamily: Arctiinae
- Genus: Callisthenia
- Species: C. costilobata

Binomial name
- Callisthenia costilobata Rothschild, 1913

Species of moth

Callisthenia costilobata is a moth of the subfamily Arctiinae. It is found in Peru.
