= Callisthenia =

Scientific classification
- Kingdom: Animalia
- Phylum: Arthropoda
- Class: Insecta
- Order: Lepidoptera
- Superfamily: Noctuoidea
- Family: Erebidae
- Subfamily: Arctiinae
- Tribe: Lithosiini
- Genus: Callisthenia; Hampson, 1900

Genus of moths

Callisthenia is a genus of moths in the subfamily Arctiinae. The genus was erected by George Hampson in 1900.

== Species ==
- Callisthenia angusta
- Callisthenia costilobata
- Callisthenia lacteata
- Callisthenia plicata
- Callisthenia ruberrima
- Callisthenia ruficollis
- Callisthenia schadei
- Callisthenia truncata
- Callisthenia variegata
