= Callisthenia truncata =

Scientific classification
- Kingdom: Animalia
- Phylum: Arthropoda
- Clade: Pancrustacea
- Class: Insecta
- Order: Lepidoptera
- Superfamily: Noctuoidea
- Family: Erebidae
- Subfamily: Arctiinae
- Genus: Callisthenia
- Species: C. truncata

Binomial name
- Callisthenia truncata Forbes, 1939

Species of moth

Callisthenia truncata is a moth of the subfamily Arctiinae. The type location is Panama, Barro Colorado Island. (Note: it was mis-recorded as being from "Colorado" in Lepindex, then this locality error entered multiple online databases).
