= Callisthenia lacteata =

Scientific classification
- Domain: Eukaryota
- Kingdom: Animalia
- Phylum: Arthropoda
- Class: Insecta
- Order: Lepidoptera
- Superfamily: Noctuoidea
- Family: Erebidae
- Subfamily: Arctiinae
- Genus: Callisthenia
- Species: C. lacteata

Binomial name
- Callisthenia lacteata (Butler, 1878)

Synonyms
- Maepha lacteata Butler, 1878

Species of moth

Callisthenia lacteata is a moth of the subfamily Arctiinae first described by Arthur Gardiner Butler in 1878. It is found in the Amazon region.
