= Callisthenia plicata =

Scientific classification
- Domain: Eukaryota
- Kingdom: Animalia
- Phylum: Arthropoda
- Class: Insecta
- Order: Lepidoptera
- Superfamily: Noctuoidea
- Family: Erebidae
- Subfamily: Arctiinae
- Genus: Callisthenia
- Species: C. plicata

Binomial name
- Callisthenia plicata (Butler, 1877)

Synonyms
- Maepha plicata Butler, 1877

Species of moth

Callisthenia plicata is a moth of the subfamily Arctiinae first described by Arthur Gardiner Butler in 1877. It is found in the Amazon region, Peru and Espírito Santo, Brazil.
