= Trocodima lenistriata =

Scientific classification
- Kingdom: Animalia
- Phylum: Arthropoda
- Class: Insecta
- Order: Lepidoptera
- Superfamily: Noctuoidea
- Family: Erebidae
- Subfamily: Arctiinae
- Genus: Trocodima
- Species: T. lenistriata

Binomial name
- Trocodima lenistriata (Dognin, 1906)

Synonyms
- Microdota lenistriata Dognin, 1906; Ischnocampa pellucida Rothschild, 1910

Species of moth

Trocodima lenistriata is a moth in the family Erebidae. It was described by Paul Dognin in 1906. It is found in Venezuela, Paraguay and Argentina.
