= Trocodima fuscipes =

Scientific classification
- Kingdom: Animalia
- Phylum: Arthropoda
- Class: Insecta
- Order: Lepidoptera
- Superfamily: Noctuoidea
- Family: Erebidae
- Subfamily: Arctiinae
- Genus: Trocodima
- Species: T. fuscipes

Binomial name
- Trocodima fuscipes (Grote, 1883)

Synonyms
- Vanessodes fuscipes Grote, 1883; Pagara fuscipes

Species of moth

Trocodima fuscipes is a moth of the family Erebidae. It was described by Augustus Radcliffe Grote in 1883. It is found in the US state of Arizona.

The wingspan is 18–22 mm. Adults have been recorded on wing in April and July.
