= Trocodima =

Scientific classification
- Domain: Eukaryota
- Kingdom: Animalia
- Phylum: Arthropoda
- Class: Insecta
- Order: Lepidoptera
- Superfamily: Noctuoidea
- Family: Erebidae
- Subfamily: Arctiinae
- Subtribe: Phaegopterina
- Genus: Trocodima; Watson, 1980

Synonyms
- Microdota Dognin, 1906 (preocc. Mulsant & Rey, 1873)

Genus of moths

Trocodima is a genus of moths in the family Erebidae. The genus was described by Watson in 1980.

== Species ==
- Trocodima fuscipes (Grote, 1883)
- Trocodima hemiceras (Forbes, 1931)
- Trocodima lenistriata (Dognin, 1906)
