= Trocodima hemiceras =

Scientific classification
- Kingdom: Animalia
- Phylum: Arthropoda
- Clade: Pancrustacea
- Class: Insecta
- Order: Lepidoptera
- Superfamily: Noctuoidea
- Family: Erebidae
- Subfamily: Arctiinae
- Genus: Trocodima
- Species: T. hemiceras

Binomial name
- Trocodima hemiceras (Forbes, 1931)

Synonyms
- Microdota hemiceras Forbes, 1931

Species of moth

Trocodima hemiceras is a moth in the family Erebidae. It was described by William Trowbridge Merrifield Forbes in 1931. It is found on Puerto Rico.
