= Pyrausta pavidalis =

Scientific classification
- Domain: Eukaryota
- Kingdom: Animalia
- Phylum: Arthropoda
- Class: Insecta
- Order: Lepidoptera
- Family: Crambidae
- Genus: Pyrausta
- Species: P. pavidalis

Binomial name
- Pyrausta pavidalis Zerny in Osthelder, 1935

Synonyms
- Trigonuncus krimensis Martin & Budashkin, 1992

Species of moth

Pyrausta pavidalis is a moth in the family Crambidae. It was described by Zerny in 1935. It is found in Turkey and Ukraine.

== Subspecies ==
- Pyrausta pavidalis pavidalis
- Pyrausta pavidalis krimensis (Martin & Budashkin, 1992) (Ukraine: Crimea)
