= Pyrausta phaeophoenica =

Scientific classification
- Kingdom: Animalia
- Phylum: Arthropoda
- Class: Insecta
- Order: Lepidoptera
- Family: Crambidae
- Genus: Pyrausta
- Species: P. phaeophoenica

Binomial name
- Pyrausta phaeophoenica Hampson, 1899

Species of moth

Pyrausta phaeophoenica is a moth in the family Crambidae described by George Hampson in 1899. It is found in Paraná, Brazil.

The wingspan is about 14 mm. The forewings are dark purplish red, irrorated (sprinkled) with yellow and greyish scales. The hindwings are black brown with a yellow spot below the middle of the cell.
