= Pyrausta subflavalis =

Scientific classification
- Domain: Eukaryota
- Kingdom: Animalia
- Phylum: Arthropoda
- Class: Insecta
- Order: Lepidoptera
- Family: Crambidae
- Genus: Pyrausta
- Species: P. subflavalis

Binomial name
- Pyrausta subflavalis (Warren, 1892)

Synonyms
- Glauconoe subflavalis Warren, 1892

Species of moth

Pyrausta subflavalis is a moth in the family Crambidae. It was described by Warren in 1892. It is found in Ethiopia, Kenya, Madagascar and Zimbabwe.
