= Pyrausta syntomidalis =

Scientific classification
- Kingdom: Animalia
- Phylum: Arthropoda
- Class: Insecta
- Order: Lepidoptera
- Family: Crambidae
- Genus: Pyrausta
- Species: P. syntomidalis

Binomial name
- Pyrausta syntomidalis (Viette, 1960)

Synonyms
- Trigonuncus syntomidalis Viette, 1960

Species of moth

Pyrausta syntomidalis is a moth in the family Crambidae. It was described by Viette in 1960. It is found in Madagascar.
