= Pyrausta amelokalis =

Scientific classification
- Kingdom: Animalia
- Phylum: Arthropoda
- Class: Insecta
- Order: Lepidoptera
- Family: Crambidae
- Genus: Pyrausta
- Species: P. amelokalis

Binomial name
- Pyrausta amelokalis (Viette, 1958)

Synonyms
- Noorda amelokalis Viette, 1958

Species of moth

Pyrausta amelokalis is a moth in the family Crambidae. It was described by Viette in 1958. It is found in Madagascar.
