= Pyrausta flavibrunnealis =

Scientific classification
- Kingdom: Animalia
- Phylum: Arthropoda
- Class: Insecta
- Order: Lepidoptera
- Family: Crambidae
- Genus: Pyrausta
- Species: P. flavibrunnealis

Binomial name
- Pyrausta flavibrunnealis Hampson, 1908

Species of moth

Pyrausta flavibrunnealis is a moth in the family Crambidae. It is found in Brazil (Bahia).
