= List of crambid genera: T =

The large moth family Crambidae contains the following genera beginning with "T":

- Tabidia
- Talanga
- Talis
- Tamsica
- Tanaobela
- Tanaophysa
- Tanaophysopsis
- Tangla
- Tasenia
- Tatobotys
- Taurometopa
- Tauroscopa
- Tawhitia
- Tchahbaharia
- Tegostoma
- Tehama
- Telespasta
- Temnobasis
- Tenerobotys
- Terastia
- Terastiodes
- Teratausta
- Teratauxta
- Tessema
- Tetracona
- Tetraprosopus
- Tetrernia
- Tetridia
- Thalamarchis
- Thaumatopsis
- Theila
- Thelda
- Thesaurica
- Thevitella
- Thisanotia
- Thliptoceras
- Tholerastis
- Tholeria
- Thyridiphora
- Thyridopsis
- Thysanodesma
- Thysanoidma
- Tipanaea
- Tipuliforma
- Tirsa
- Titanio
- Tobata
- Togabotys
- Tomissa
- Torqueola
- Tortriculladia
- Toulgoetodes
- Toxobotys
- Trematarcha
- Trichaea
- Trichoceraea
- Trichophysetis
- Trichoptychodes
- Trichovalva
- Trieropis
- Trigamozeucta
- Trigonobela
- Trigonoorda
- Trigonuncus
- Trinidadia
- Tripodaula
- Trischistognatha
- Tritaea
- Trithyris
- Triuncidia
- Troctoceras
- Tryporyza
- Tulaya
- Tulla
- Turania
- Tylostega
- Tyspana
- Tyspanodes
