= List of crambid genera: N =

The large moth family Crambidae contains the following genera beginning with "N":

- Nacoleia
- Nacoleiopsis
- Nagahama
- Nagiella
- Namangania
- Nankogobinda
- Nannobotys
- Nannomorpha
- Nascia
- Nausinoe
- Neadeloides
- Nealgedonia
- Neargyractis
- Neargyria
- Neargyrioides
- Neasarta
- Nechilo
- Neerupa
- Nehydriris
- Neoanalthes
- Neobanepa
- Neocataclysta
- Neocrambus
- Neoculladia
- Neocymbopteryx
- Neodactria
- Neoepicorsia
- Neoeromene
- Neogenesis
- Neohelvibotys
- Neohendecasis
- Neoleucinodes
- Neomabra
- Neomusotima
- Neopediasia
- Neoschoenobia
- Neostege
- Nephalia
- Nephelobotys
- Nephelolychnis
- Nephrogramma
- Nesarcha
- Nesolocha
- Neurophruda
- Neurophyseta
- Nevrina
- Nicaria
- Niphadaza
- Niphadoses
- Niphograpta
- Niphopyralis
- Niphostola
- Nistra
- Noctuelia
- Noctueliopsis
- Noctuelita
- Nolckenia
- Nomis
- Nomophila
- Nonazochis
- Noorda
- Noordodes
- Nosophora
- Notarcha
- Nothomastix
- Nothosalbia
- Notocrambus
- Nuarace
- Nyctiplanes
- Nymphaeella
- Nymphicula
- Nymphula
- Nymphuliella
- Nymphulodes
- Nymphulosis
