= List of crambid genera: H =

The large moth family Crambidae contains the following genera beginning with "H":

- Haematia
- Hahncappsia
- Haimbachia
- Haitufa
- Haliotigris
- Hammocallos
- Hapalia
- Haplochytis
- Haplopediasia
- Haploplatytes
- Haritalodes
- Harpadispar
- Hednota
- Hedylepta
- Hedyleptopsis
- Heliothela
- Heliothelopsis
- Hellula
- Helonastes
- Helvibotys
- Hemiloba
- Hemiplatytes
- Hemiptocha
- Hemiscopis
- Hemopsis
- Hendecasis
- Heortia
- Heptalitha
- Herbula
- Hercynella
- Heringiella
- Herpetogramma
- Heterocnephes
- Heterudea
- Hilaopsis
- Hileithia
- Hoenia
- Hombergia
- Homochroa
- Homophysa
- Homophysodes
- Hoplisa
- Hoploscopa
- Hormatholepis
- Hositea
- Hoterodes
- Hutuna
- Hyalea
- Hyalinarcha
- Hyalitis
- Hyalobathra
- Hyaloplaga
- Hyalorista
- Hydreuretis
- Hydriris
- Hydrocampus
- Hydrophysa
- Hydropionea
- Hydrorybina
- Hygraula
- Hylebatis
- Hymenia
- Hymenoptychis
- Hyperanalyta
- Hyperectis
- Hyperlais
- Hyperthalia
- Hyphercyna
- Hypiesta
- Hypotomorpha
- Hystrixia
