= List of crambid genera: G =

The large moth family Crambidae contains the following genera beginning with "G":

- Gabalaeca
- Gadessa
- Gadira
- Galadra
- Gargela
- Geshna
- Gesneria
- Gethosyne
- Ghesquierellana
- Gibeauxia
- Giorgia
- Girdharia
- Girtexta
- Glaphyria
- Glaucocharis
- Glaucoda
- Glaucodontia
- Glauconoe
- Glycythyma
- Glyphandra
- Glyphidomarptis
- Glyphodes
- Gnamptorhiza
- Godara
- Goliathodes
- Goniopalpia
- Goniophysetis
- Goniorhynchus
- Gonocausta
- Gonodiscus
- Gononoorda
- Gonopionea
- Gonothyris
- Graphicopoda
- Gynenomis
- Gypodes
- Gyptitia
- Gyros
