= List of crambid genera: O =

The large moth family Crambidae contains the following genera beginning with "O":

- Obtusipalpis
- Occidentalia
- Ochlia
- Odilla
- Odontivalvia
- Oedematarcha
- Oenobotys
- Oligernis
- Oligocentris
- Oligostigma
- Oligostigmoides
- Omiodes
- Ommatospila
- Omphaloptera
- Omphisa
- Opisthedeicta
- Opsibotys
- Orenaia
- Oressaula
- Orobena
- Orocala
- Orocrambus
- Oronomis
- Orosana
- Orphanostigma
- Orphnophanes
- Orthocona
- Orthomecyna
- Orthoraphis
- Orthospila
- Oseriates
- Osiriaca
- Osphrantis
- Ostrinia
- Otiophora
- Oxyelophila
