= List of crambid genera: B =

The large moth family Crambidae contains the following genera beginning with "B":

- Bacotoma
- Baeoptila
- Balaenifrons
- Banepa
- Barisoa
- Basonga
- Batiana
- Beebea
- Betousa
- Bicilia
- Bifalculina
- Bissetia
- Blechroglossa
- Blepharomastix
- Blepharucha
- Bleszynskia
- Bocchoris
- Bocchoropsis
- Boeotarcha
- Boiea
- Boreophila
- Borer
- Botyodes
- Botys
- Boursinella
- Bradina
- Bradinomorpha
- Brevicella
- Brihaspa
- Burathema
- Burmannia
