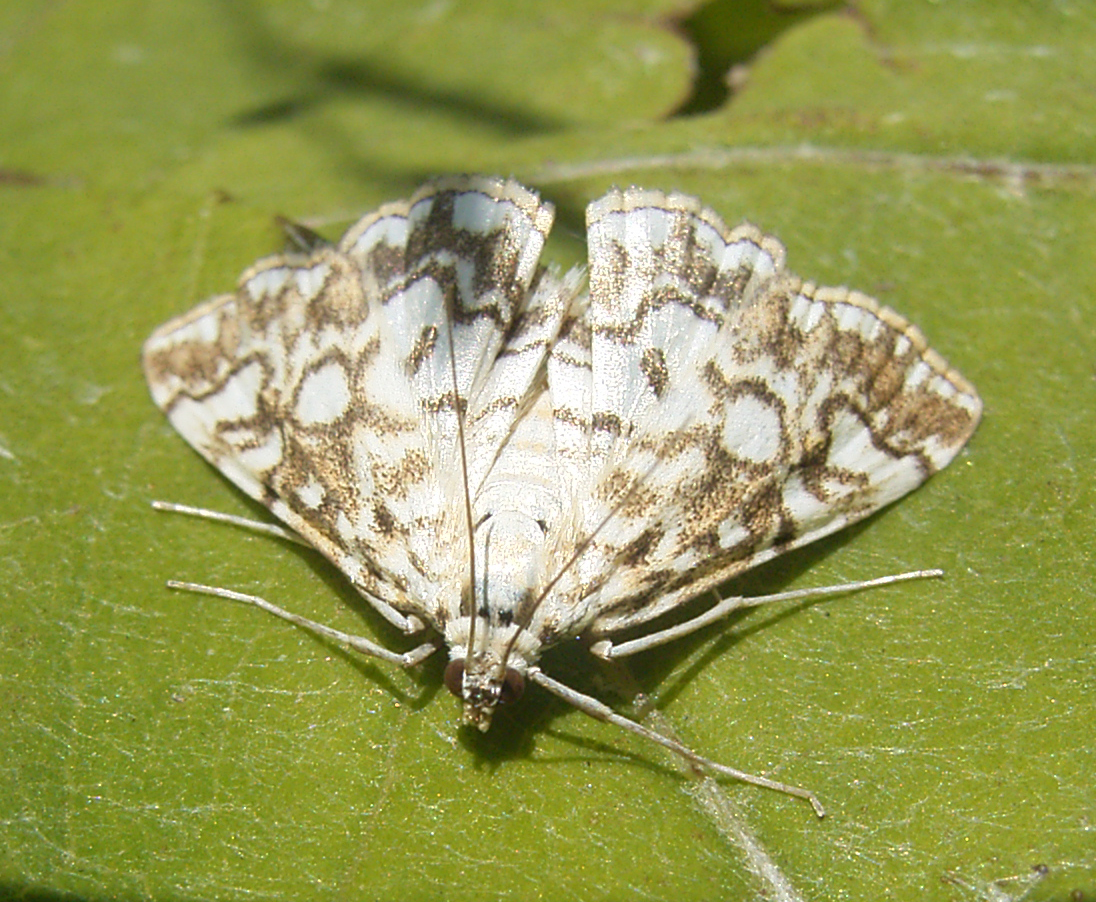
- Elophila nymphaeata

Scientific classification
- Kingdom: Animalia
- Phylum: Arthropoda
- Clade: Pancrustacea
- Class: Insecta
- Order: Lepidoptera
- Family: Crambidae
- Subfamily: Acentropinae; Stephens, 1836

Genera
- See text

Synonyms
- Acentridae A. Speyer, 1869; Acentropodidae Dunning, 1872; Aquaticae Hübner, 1796; Argyractini Lange, 1956; Cataclystae Hübner, 1825; Chloephila Guilding, 1830; Elophilae Hübner, 1825; Kamptoptera Guilding, 1830; Lathrotelidae J. F. G. Clarke, 1971; Nymphulae Hübner, 1825; Nymphulites Duponchel, 1845; Hydrocampidae Guenée, 1854; Parapoynges Hübner, 1825

= Acentropinae =

Subfamily of moths

Acentropinae is a fairly small subfamily of the lepidopteran family Crambidae, the crambid snout moths. Species of this subfamily are exclusively found in wetlands and aquatic habitats.

== Systematics ==
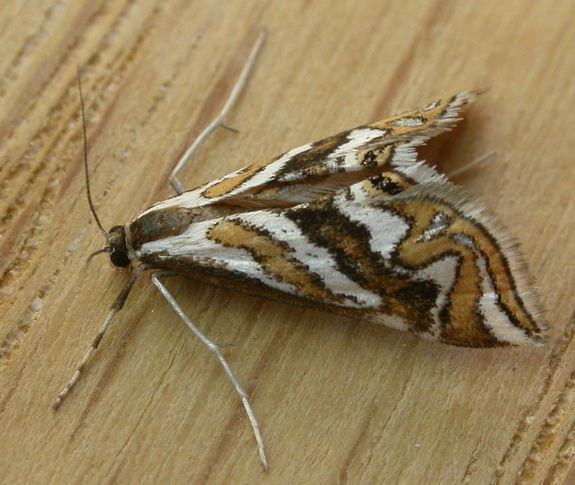
Anydraula glycerialis

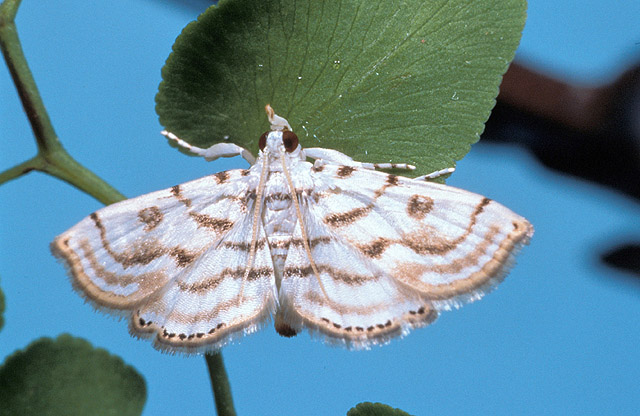
Cataclysta camptozonale

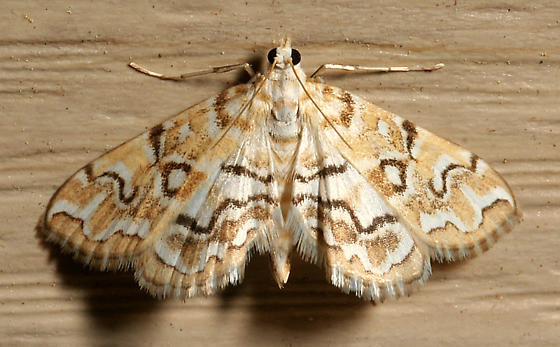
Elophila icciusalis

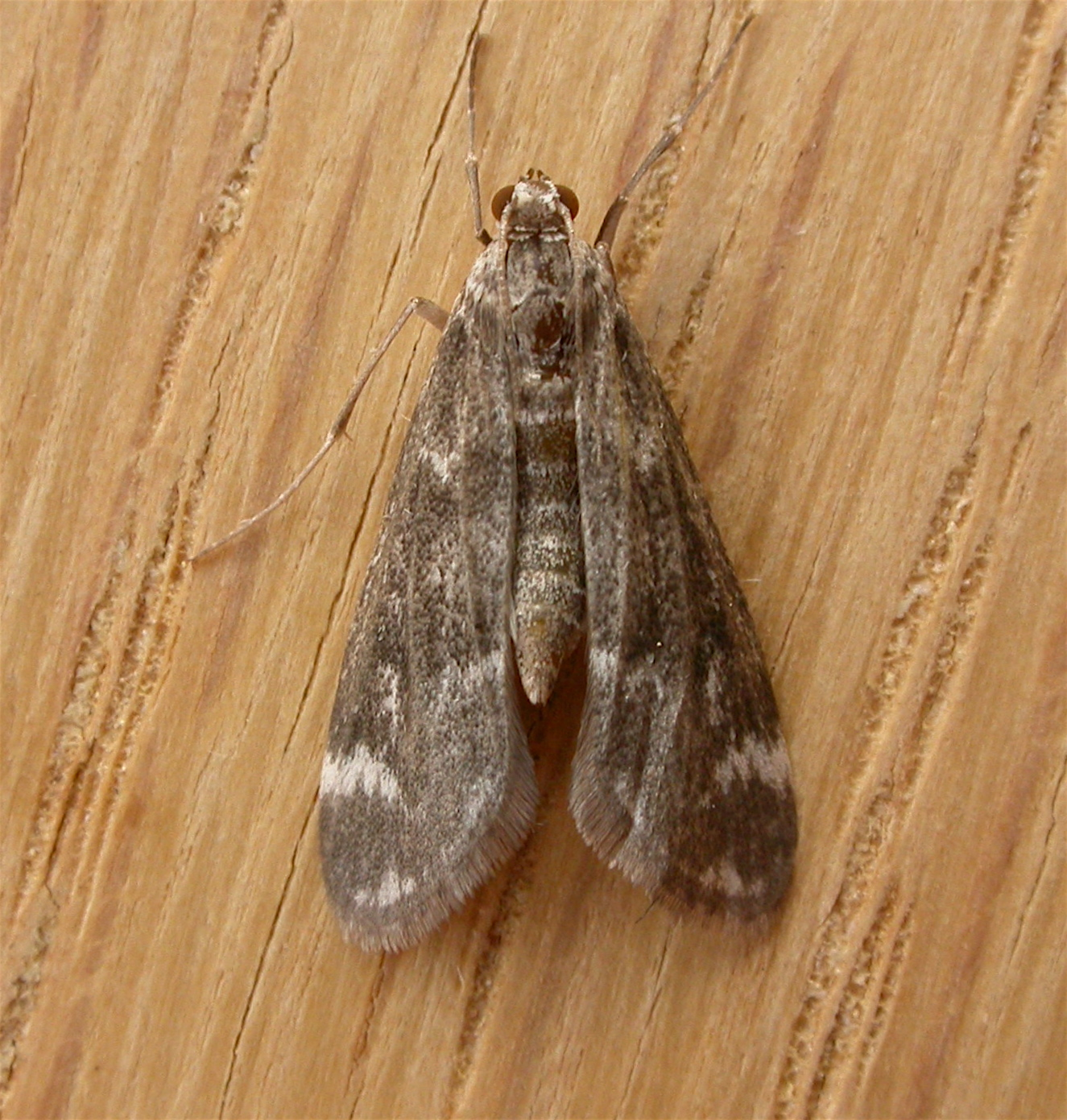
Hygraula nitens

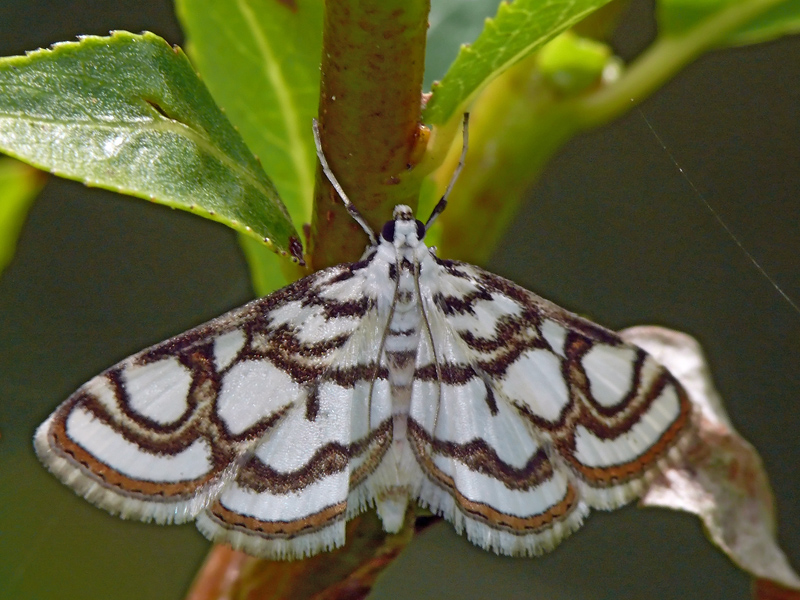
Nymphula stagnata

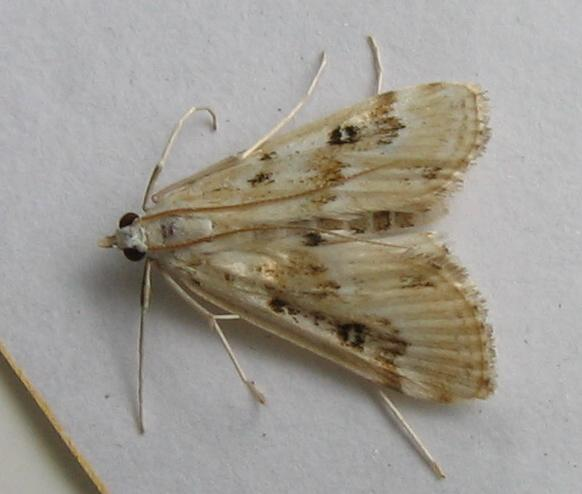
Parapoynx stratiotata

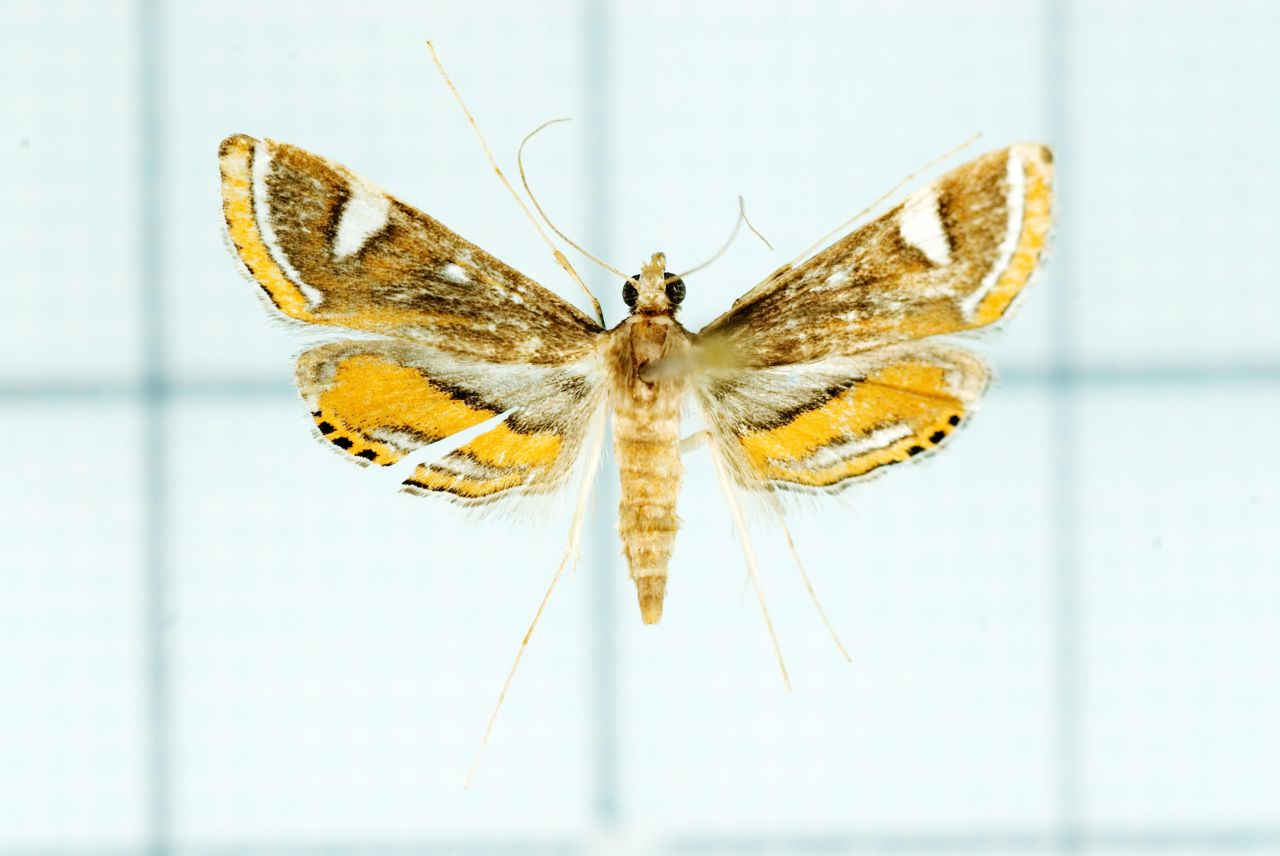
Strepsinoma hapilistalis

In modern treatments, the former subfamily Nymphulinae is mostly treated as a tribe within Acentropinae. There are about 730 species in 78 genera. Only 13 species in 6 genera are found in Europe.

- Acentria Stephens, 1829 (= Acentropus J. Curtis, 1834; Setina Hübner, 1819; Zancle Stephens, 1833)
- Agassiziella Yoshiyasu, 1989 (= Agassizia Yoshiyasu, 1987)
- Almonia Walker, 1866
- Anydraula Meyrick, 1885
- Araeomorpha Turner, 1908 (= Tholerastis Turner, 1915)
- Argyractis Hampson, 1897
- Argyractoides Lange, 1956
- Argyrophorodes Marion, 1956
- Aulacodes Guenée, 1854 (= Hydrophysa Guenée, 1854)
- Banepa Moore, 1888
- Brevicella Kenrick, 1912
- Callilitha Munroe, 1959
- Cataclysta Hübner, 1825 (= Catoclysta Hampson, 1893)
- Chrysendeton Grote, 1881
- Clepsicosma Meyrick, 1888
- Compsophila Meyrick, 1886
- Contiger Lange, 1956
- Cryptocosma Lederer, 1863 (= Chalcoelopsis Dyar, 1914)
- Decticogaster Snellen, 1880
- Diathraustodes Hampson, 1896
- Dodanga Moore, 1886
- Elophila Hübner, 1822 (= Cyrtogramme Yoshiyasu, 1985; Elophila Hübner, 1806; Hydrocampus Berthold, 1827; Hydrocampa Stephens, 1829; Hydrocampe Latreille, 1829; Munroessa Lange, 1956; Synclita Lederer, 1863)
- Eoophyla Swinhoe, 1900
- Eoparargyractis Lange, 1956 (= Eoparargyractis Lange, 1956)
- Ephormotris Meyrick, 1933
- Eristena Warren, 1896
- Eurytorna Meyrick, 1886
- Galadra Walker, 1865
- Giorgia J. F. G. Clarke, 1965
- Glyphandra Karsch, 1900
- Goniopalpia Hampson, 1903
- Hemiloba Swinhoe, 1901
- Hyaloplaga Warren, 1892 (= Hyaloplagia Sharp, 1893)
- Hygraula Meyrick, 1885 (= Blechroglossa Turner, 1937; Blechroglosso Neave, 1950)
- Hylebatis Turner, 1908
- Kasania Krulikovsky, 1910
- Langessa Munroe, 1972
- Lasiogyia Hampson, 1907
- Lathroteles J. F. G. Clarke, 1971
- Leucogephyra Warren, 1896
- Margarochroma Warren, 1896
- Margarosticha Lederer, 1863
- Neargyractis Lange, 1956
- Neocataclysta Lange, 1956
- Neoschoenobia Hampson, 1900 (= Eranistis Meyrick, 1910)
- Neurophruda Warren, 1896 (= Neophruda Hampson, 1897)
- Nicaria Snellen, 1880
- Nyctiplanes Turner, 1937
- Nymphicula Snellen, [1880]
- Nymphula Schrank, 1802 (= Pseudoparaponyx Patocka, 1951)
- Nymphuliella Lange, 1956
- Nymphulodes Hampson, 1919
- Oligernis Meyrick, 1894
- Oligostigma Guenée, 1854
- Oligostigmoides Lange, 1956
- Opisthedeicta Warren, 1890
- Osphrantis Meyrick, 1897
- Oxyelophila Forbes, 1922
- Paracataclysta Yoshiyasu, 1983
- Paracymoriza Warren, 1890 (= Micromania Swinhoe, 1894; Stenicula Snellen, 1901)
- Parapoynx Hübner, 1825 (= Cosmophylla Turner, 1908; Eustales Clemens, 1860; Hydreuretis Meyrick, 1885; Microdracon Warren, 1890; Nymphaeella Grote, 1880; Paraponyx Guenée, 1854; Sironia Clemens, 1860)
- Petrophila Guilding, 1830 (= Parargyractis Lange, 1956)
- Potamomusa Yoshiyasu, 1985 (= Potamusa Speidel & Mey, 1999)
- Pseudlithosia Hampson, 1907 (= Pseudolithosia Neave, 1940)
- Pythagoraea Meyrick, 1929 (= Pythagorea Klima, 1937)
- Stegothyris Lederer, 1863
- Strepsinoma Meyrick, 1897
- Symphonia Hampson, 1896
- Synclitodes Munroe, 1974
- Temnobasis Gaede, 1916
- Teratausta Hampson, 1903
- Teratauxta E. Hering, 1901 (= Ridleyana Hampson, 1906)
- Tetrernia Meyrick, 1890 (= Metaclysta Hampson, 1906)
- Theila Swinhoe, 1900 (= Ambahona Marion, 1954; Ambahonia Marion, 1954)
- Thevitella Viette, 1958
- Usingeriessa Lange, 1956

== Former genera ==
- Ambia Walker, 1859
- Gethosyne Warren, 1896
- Niphadaza Butler, 1886
- Physematia Lederer, 1863

== See also ==
- List of crambid genera
