= Nicaria =

Nicaria may refer to

- Another name for Icaria, a Greek island
- A German ship, launched 1901, seized by the United States and renamed USS Pensacola (AK-7)
- Nicaria (moth), a genus of moths
