= China mark moth =

China mark moth may refer to:

- Cataclysta lemnata, the small china mark moth, found in Europe
- Elophila nymphaeata, the brown china mark moth, a relatively common European species
- Nymphula nitidulata, the beautiful china mark, found across Eurasia
- Nymphuliella daeckealis, a North American species
