= Burmannia =

Burmannia may refer to:

- Burmannia (plant), a genus of mycoheterotrophic flowering plants in the family Burmanniaceae
- Burmannia marmorellus, a species of moth in the monotypic genus Burmannia
