= Araeomorpha limnophila =

Scientific classification
- Domain: Eukaryota
- Kingdom: Animalia
- Phylum: Arthropoda
- Class: Insecta
- Order: Lepidoptera
- Family: Crambidae
- Genus: Araeomorpha
- Species: A. limnophila

Binomial name
- Araeomorpha limnophila Turner, 1937

Species of moth

Araeomorpha limnophila is a moth in the family Crambidae. It is found in Australia, where it has been recorded from Queensland.

The wings are brown. There are two to three dark spots on the forewings.
