= Eurytorna =

Scientific classification
- Kingdom: Animalia
- Phylum: Arthropoda
- Class: Insecta
- Order: Lepidoptera
- Family: Crambidae
- Subfamily: Acentropinae
- Genus: Eurytorna; Meyrick, 1886
- Species: E. heterodoxa

Binomial name
- Eurytorna heterodoxa Meyrick, 1886

Genus of moths

Eurytorna is a genus of moths of the family Crambidae. It contains only one species, Eurytorna heterodoxa, which is found on Fiji.
