= Langessa =

Scientific classification
- Kingdom: Animalia
- Phylum: Arthropoda
- Class: Insecta
- Order: Lepidoptera
- Family: Crambidae
- Subfamily: Acentropinae
- Genus: Langessa; Munroe, 1972
- Species: L. nomophilalis

Binomial name
- Langessa nomophilalis (Dyar, 1906)

Synonyms
- Nymphula nomophilalis Dyar, 1906

Genus of moths

Langessa is a genus of moths of the family Crambidae. It contains only one species, Langessa nomophilalis, the black langessa moth, which is found in North America, where it has been recorded from Alabama, Florida and South Carolina.

The wingspan is 20–22 mm. The forewings are brown with a bronzy reflection. The hindwings are grey brown with three black patches on the inner margin and two faint white submarginal lines. Adults have been recorded on wing year round.

The larvae feed on aquatic plants.
