= Hyperectis dioctias =

Scientific classification
- Kingdom: Animalia
- Phylum: Arthropoda
- Class: Insecta
- Order: Lepidoptera
- Family: Crambidae
- Genus: Hyperectis
- Species: H. dioctias

Binomial name
- Hyperectis dioctias Meyrick, 1904

Synonyms
- Hydriris exaucta Meyrick, 1928; Ercta excausta (misspelling)

Species of moth

Hyperectis dioctias is a moth of the family Crambidae. It has only been recorded from the Hawaiian islands of Kauai, Oahu, Maui and Hawaii, but it might be an introduced species in the Hawaiian Islands.

The male has a peculiar "bladder" under the hindwing.
