= Tamsica geralea =

Scientific classification
- Kingdom: Animalia
- Phylum: Arthropoda
- Class: Insecta
- Order: Lepidoptera
- Family: Crambidae
- Subfamily: Crambinae
- Tribe: Diptychophorini
- Genus: Tamsica
- Species: T. geralea

Binomial name
- Tamsica geralea (Meyrick, 1899)

Synonyms
- Talis geralea Meyrick, 1899

Species of moth

Tamsica geralea is a moth of the family Crambidae. It is endemic to the Hawaiian island of Kauai.
