= Contiger =

Scientific classification
- Kingdom: Animalia
- Phylum: Arthropoda
- Clade: Pancrustacea
- Class: Insecta
- Order: Lepidoptera
- Family: Crambidae
- Subfamily: Acentropinae
- Genus: Contiger; Lange, 1956
- Species: C. vittatalis

Binomial name
- Contiger vittatalis (Dyar, 1906)

Synonyms
- Oligostigma vittatalis Dyar, 1906

Genus of moths

Contiger is a genus of moths of the family Crambidae. It contains only one species, Contiger vittatalis, which is found on North America, where it has been recorded from Florida.

The wingspan is about 15 mm. Adults have been recorded on wing in January, from March to April, from June to July and from September to October.
