= Oligostigmoides cryptalis =

Scientific classification
- Kingdom: Animalia
- Phylum: Arthropoda
- Class: Insecta
- Order: Lepidoptera
- Family: Crambidae
- Genus: Oligostigmoides
- Species: O. cryptalis

Binomial name
- Oligostigmoides cryptalis (H. Druce, 1896)

Synonyms
- Cataclysta cryptalis H. Druce, 1896

Species of moth

Oligostigmoides cryptalis is a species of moth in the family Crambidae. It was described by Herbert Druce in 1896. It is found in Mexico (Xalapa, Orizaba), Costa Rica and Panama.
