= Oligostigmoides cuernavacale =

Scientific classification
- Kingdom: Animalia
- Phylum: Arthropoda
- Class: Insecta
- Order: Lepidoptera
- Family: Crambidae
- Genus: Oligostigmoides
- Species: O. cuernavacale

Binomial name
- Oligostigmoides cuernavacale Lange, 1956

Species of moth

Oligostigmoides cuernavacale is a species of moth in the family Crambidae. It was described by William Harry Lange in 1956. It is found in Mexico.
