= Potamomusa =

Scientific classification
- Domain: Eukaryota
- Kingdom: Animalia
- Phylum: Arthropoda
- Class: Insecta
- Order: Lepidoptera
- Family: Crambidae
- Subfamily: Acentropinae
- Genus: Potamomusa; Yoshiyasu, 1985

Synonyms
- Potamusa Speidel & Mey, 1999

Genus of moths

Potamomusa is a genus of moths of the family Crambidae.

== Species ==
- Potamomusa aquilonia Yoshiyasu, 1985
- Potamomusa midas (Butler, 1881)
