= Nothomastix chromalis =

Scientific classification
- Kingdom: Animalia
- Phylum: Arthropoda
- Class: Insecta
- Order: Lepidoptera
- Family: Crambidae
- Genus: Nothomastix
- Species: N. chromalis

Binomial name
- Nothomastix chromalis (Walker, 1866)

Synonyms
- Botys chromalis Walker, 1866; Conogethes sisyroptila Meyrick, 1933

Species of moth

Nothomastix chromalis is a moth in the family Crambidae. It was described by Francis Walker in 1866. It is found in India (Sikkim) and on Java.
