= Argyrophorodes suttoni =

Scientific classification
- Kingdom: Animalia
- Phylum: Arthropoda
- Class: Insecta
- Order: Lepidoptera
- Family: Crambidae
- Genus: Argyrophorodes
- Species: A. suttoni

Binomial name
- Argyrophorodes suttoni Agassiz, 2012

Species of moth

Argyrophorodes suttoni is a species of moth in the family Crambidae. It was described by David John Lawrence Agassiz in 2012. It is found in the Democratic Republic of the Congo.

The wingspan is 16–17 mm.

== Etymology ==
The species is named for Dr Stephen Sutton, who first collected the species.
