= Argyrophorodes grisealis =

Scientific classification
- Kingdom: Animalia
- Phylum: Arthropoda
- Class: Insecta
- Order: Lepidoptera
- Family: Crambidae
- Genus: Argyrophorodes
- Species: A. grisealis

Binomial name
- Argyrophorodes grisealis Marion, 1957

Species of moth

Argyrophorodes grisealis is a species of moth in the family Crambidae. It was described by Hubert Marion in 1957. It is found on Madagascar.
