= Callilitha boharti =

Scientific classification
- Kingdom: Animalia
- Phylum: Arthropoda
- Class: Insecta
- Order: Lepidoptera
- Family: Crambidae
- Genus: Callilitha
- Species: C. boharti

Binomial name
- Callilitha boharti Munroe, 1959

Species of moth

Callilitha boharti is a species of moth in the family Crambidae. It was described by Eugene G. Munroe in 1959. It is found on Guadalcanal in the Solomon Islands.
