= Otiophora clavifera =

Scientific classification
- Kingdom: Animalia
- Phylum: Arthropoda
- Class: Insecta
- Order: Lepidoptera
- Family: Crambidae
- Genus: Otiophora
- Species: O. clavifera

Binomial name
- Otiophora clavifera (Hampson, 1899)

Synonyms
- Pionea clavifera Hampson, 1899

Species of moth

Otiophora clavifera is a moth in the family Crambidae. It was described by George Hampson in 1899. It is found in Australia, where it has been recorded from Queensland.

The wingspan is about 22 mm. The forewings are fuscous brown mixed with ochreous. The antemedial line is represented by an oblique series of black points. There is also a terminal series of points. The hindwings are paler brown with a terminal series of minute dark points.
