= Argyrophorodes =

Scientific classification
- Domain: Eukaryota
- Kingdom: Animalia
- Phylum: Arthropoda
- Class: Insecta
- Order: Lepidoptera
- Family: Crambidae
- Subfamily: Acentropinae
- Genus: Argyrophorodes; Marion, 1956

Genus of moths

Argyrophodes is a genus of moths of the family Crambidae.

== Species ==
- Argyrophorodes angolensis Agassiz, 2012 (from Angola, Congo and Zambia)
- Argyrophorodes anosibalis Marion, 1957 (from Madagascar)
- Argyrophorodes catalalis (Marion & Viette, 1956) (from Madagascar)
- Argyrophorodes dubiefalis Viette, 1978 (from Madagascar)
- Argyrophorodes grisealis Marion, 1957 (from Madagascar)
- Argyrophorodes hydrocampalis Marion, 1957 (from Madagascar)
- Argyrophorodes suttoni Agassiz, 2012 (from Congo )
