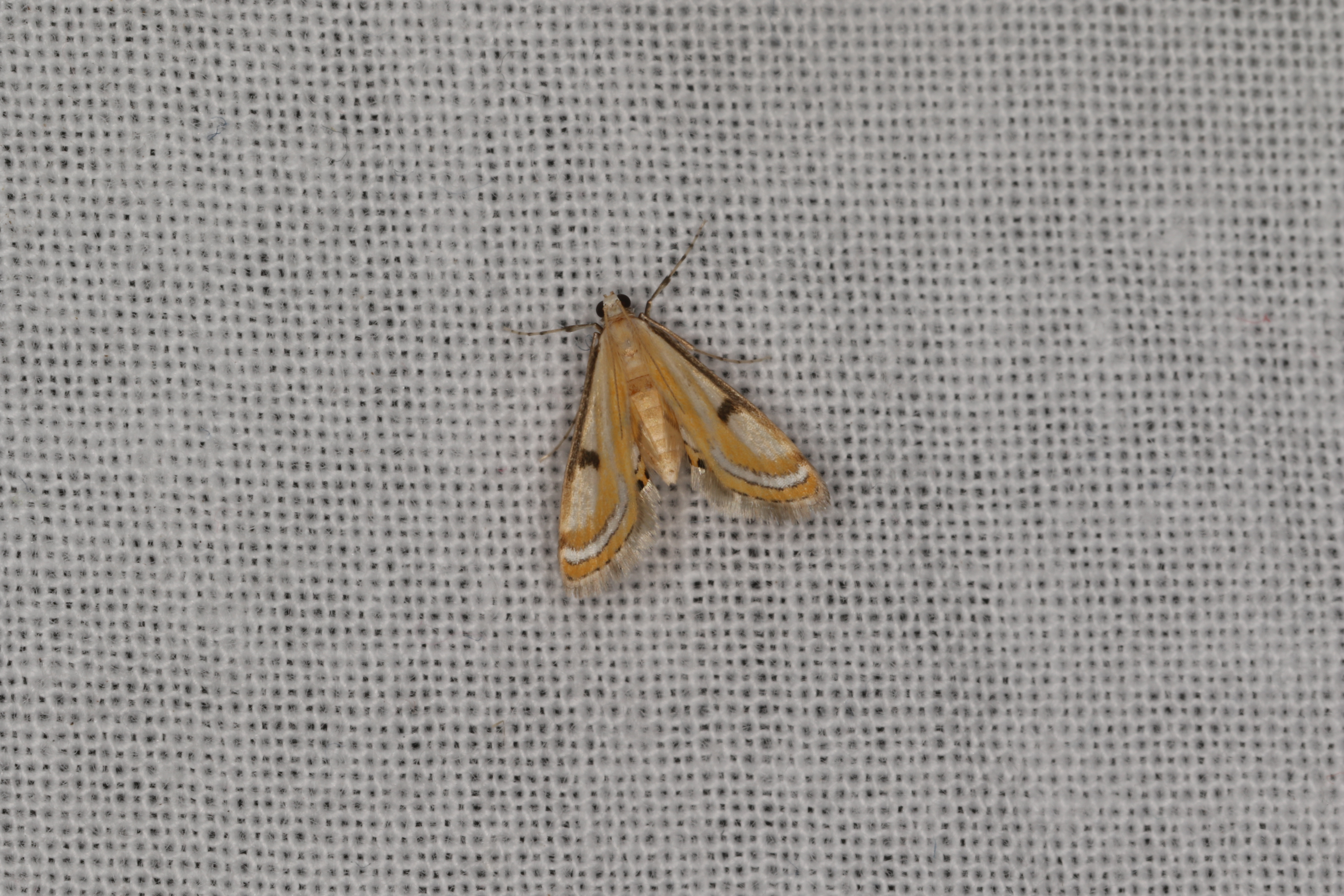

Scientific classification
- Kingdom: Animalia
- Phylum: Arthropoda
- Class: Insecta
- Order: Lepidoptera
- Family: Crambidae
- Genus: Tetrernia
- Species: T. teminitis

Binomial name
- Tetrernia teminitis Meyrick, 1890

Synonyms
- Oligostigma centrimacula Hampson, 1917

= Tetrernia terminitis =

Species of moth

Tetrernia teminitis is a species of moth in the family Crambidae. It was described by Edward Meyrick in 1890. It is found in Australia, where it has been recorded from Queensland.
