= Eoparargyractis =

Scientific classification
- Domain: Eukaryota
- Kingdom: Animalia
- Phylum: Arthropoda
- Class: Insecta
- Order: Lepidoptera
- Family: Crambidae
- Subfamily: Acentropinae
- Genus: Eoparargyractis; Lange, 1956

Synonyms
- Eoparargyractis Lange, 1956

Genus of moths

Eoparargyractis is a genus of moths of the family Crambidae.

== Species ==
- Eoparargyractis floridalis Lange, 1956
- Eoparargyractis irroratalis (Dyar, 1917)
- Eoparargyractis plevie (Dyar, 1917)
