= Oligostigmoides mediocinctalis =

Scientific classification
- Kingdom: Animalia
- Phylum: Arthropoda
- Class: Insecta
- Order: Lepidoptera
- Family: Crambidae
- Genus: Oligostigmoides
- Species: O. mediocinctalis

Binomial name
- Oligostigmoides mediocinctalis (Hampson, 1897)

Synonyms
- Parthenodes mediocinctalis Hampson, 1897

Species of moth

Oligostigmoides mediocinctalis is a species of moth in the family Crambidae. It was described by George Hampson in 1897. It is found in Rio de Janeiro, Brazil.
