= Gadessa ossea =

Scientific classification
- Domain: Eukaryota
- Kingdom: Animalia
- Phylum: Arthropoda
- Class: Insecta
- Order: Lepidoptera
- Family: Crambidae
- Genus: Gadessa
- Species: G. ossea

Binomial name
- Gadessa ossea Butler, 1889

Species of moth

Gadessa ossea is a moth in the family Crambidae. It was described by Arthur Gardiner Butler in 1889. It is found in Himachal Pradesh, India.
