= Tamsica homodora =

Scientific classification
- Kingdom: Animalia
- Phylum: Arthropoda
- Class: Insecta
- Order: Lepidoptera
- Family: Crambidae
- Subfamily: Crambinae
- Tribe: Diptychophorini
- Genus: Tamsica
- Species: T. homodora

Binomial name
- Tamsica homodora (Meyrick, 1899)

Synonyms
- Talis homodora Meyrick, 1899

Species of moth

Tamsica homodora is a moth of the family Crambidae. It is endemic to the Hawaiian island of Oahu.
