= Trigonobela perfenestrata =

Scientific classification
- Domain: Eukaryota
- Kingdom: Animalia
- Phylum: Arthropoda
- Class: Insecta
- Order: Lepidoptera
- Family: Crambidae
- Genus: Trigonobela
- Species: T. perfenestrata

Binomial name
- Trigonobela perfenestrata (Butler, 1882)

Synonyms
- Botys perfenestrata Butler, 1882

Species of moth

Trigonobela perfenestrata is a moth in the family Crambidae. It was described by Arthur Gardiner Butler in 1882. It is found in Papua New Guinea and Australia, where it has been recorded from the Northern Territory and Queensland.

The wingspan is about 32 mm. Adults are dull rose, the wings spotted with orange-yellow spots, many of which have hyaline-whitish centres.
