= Eoparargyractis floridalis =

Scientific classification
- Kingdom: Animalia
- Phylum: Arthropoda
- Clade: Pancrustacea
- Class: Insecta
- Order: Lepidoptera
- Family: Crambidae
- Genus: Eoparargyractis
- Species: E. floridalis

Binomial name
- Eoparargyractis floridalis Lange, 1956

Species of moth

Eoparargyractis floridalis is a species of moth in the family Crambidae. It was described by William Harry Lange in 1956. It is found in North America, where it has been recorded from Florida and South Carolina. Adults have been recorded on wing from March to May, in July and from September to November.
