= Nothomastix klossi =

Scientific classification
- Kingdom: Animalia
- Phylum: Arthropoda
- Class: Insecta
- Order: Lepidoptera
- Family: Crambidae
- Genus: Nothomastix
- Species: N. klossi

Binomial name
- Nothomastix klossi (Rothschild, 1915)

Synonyms
- Syllepte klossi Rothschild, 1915

Species of moth

Nothomastix klossi is a moth in the family Crambidae. It was described by Rothschild in 1915. It is found in Papua New Guinea.
