= Lasiogyia =

Scientific classification
- Domain: Eukaryota
- Kingdom: Animalia
- Phylum: Arthropoda
- Class: Insecta
- Order: Lepidoptera
- Family: Crambidae
- Subfamily: Acentropinae
- Genus: Lasiogyia; Hampson, 1907
- Species: L. xanthozonata

Binomial name
- Lasiogyia xanthozonata Hampson, 1907

Genus of moths

Lasiogyia is a monotypic moth genus of the family Crambidae described by George Hampson in 1907. It contains only one species, Lasiogyia xanthozonata, described by the same author in the same year, which is found in New Guinea.
