= Hemiptocha agraphella =

Scientific classification
- Domain: Eukaryota
- Kingdom: Animalia
- Phylum: Arthropoda
- Class: Insecta
- Order: Lepidoptera
- Family: Crambidae
- Subfamily: Crambinae
- Tribe: incertae sedis
- Genus: Hemiptocha
- Species: H. agraphella

Binomial name
- Hemiptocha agraphella Dognin, 1905

Species of moth

Hemiptocha agraphella is a moth in the family Crambidae. It was described by Paul Dognin in 1905. It is found in Argentina.
