= Helvibotys helvialis =

Scientific classification
- Kingdom: Animalia
- Phylum: Arthropoda
- Class: Insecta
- Order: Lepidoptera
- Family: Crambidae
- Genus: Helvibotys
- Species: H. helvialis

Binomial name
- Helvibotys helvialis (Walker, 1859)

Synonyms
- Spilodes helvialis Walker, 1859; Botys thycesalis Walker, 1859; Botys apertalis Walker, [1866]; Botys citrina Grote & Robinson, 1867

Species of moth

Helvibotys helvialis is a moth in the family Crambidae. It was described by Francis Walker in 1859. It is found in North America, where it has been recorded from California to Florida, north in the east to Massachusetts, Quebec, Ontario, Michigan and Iowa.

The wingspan is 18–20 mm for males and 16–20 mm for females. Adults have been recorded on wing from April to September.

The larvae feed on Amaranthus species and Beta vulgaris.
