= Torqueola hypolampra =

Scientific classification
- Domain: Eukaryota
- Kingdom: Animalia
- Phylum: Arthropoda
- Class: Insecta
- Order: Lepidoptera
- Family: Crambidae
- Genus: Torqueola
- Species: T. hypolampra

Binomial name
- Torqueola hypolampra Turner, 1915

Species of moth

Torqueola hypolampra is a moth in the family Crambidae. It was described by Turner in 1915. It is found in Australia, where it has been recorded from Queensland.

The wingspan is about 36 mm. Both the fore- and hindwings are dark-fuscous with a purple gloss.
