= Oligocentris uniformalis =

Scientific classification
- Kingdom: Animalia
- Phylum: Arthropoda
- Class: Insecta
- Order: Lepidoptera
- Family: Crambidae
- Genus: Oligocentris
- Species: O. uniformalis

Binomial name
- Oligocentris uniformalis Hampson, 1912

Species of moth

Oligocentris uniformalis is a moth in the family Crambidae. It was described by George Hampson in 1912. It is found in the Sula Islands of Indonesia (type locality "Sula Mangoli").
