= Araeomorpha diplopa =

Scientific classification
- Domain: Eukaryota
- Kingdom: Animalia
- Phylum: Arthropoda
- Class: Insecta
- Order: Lepidoptera
- Family: Crambidae
- Genus: Araeomorpha
- Species: A. diplopa

Binomial name
- Araeomorpha diplopa (Lower, 1903)

Synonyms
- Nymphula diplopa Lower, 1903; Araeomorpha atmota Turner, 1908; Tholerastis elaphra Turner, 1915

Species of moth

Araeomorpha diplopa is a moth in the family Crambidae. It is found in Australia, where it has been recorded from New South Wales and Queensland.
