= Toxobotys boveyi =

Scientific classification
- Domain: Eukaryota
- Kingdom: Animalia
- Phylum: Arthropoda
- Class: Insecta
- Order: Lepidoptera
- Family: Crambidae
- Genus: Toxobotys
- Species: T. boveyi

Binomial name
- Toxobotys boveyi Bänziger, 1987

Species of moth

Toxobotys boveyi is a moth in the family Crambidae. It was described by Hans Bänziger in 1987. It is found in Thailand.

The wingspan is 27–29 mm.

== Etymology ==
The species is named for Prof. Dr. P. Bovey.
