= Pseudlithosia =

Scientific classification
- Domain: Eukaryota
- Kingdom: Animalia
- Phylum: Arthropoda
- Class: Insecta
- Order: Lepidoptera
- Family: Crambidae
- Subfamily: Acentropinae
- Genus: Pseudlithosia; Hampson, 1907
- Species: P. schausi

Binomial name
- Pseudlithosia schausi Hampson, 1907

Synonyms
- Pseudolithosia Neave, 1940

Genus of moths

Pseudlithosia is a monotypic moth genus of the family Crambidae described by George Hampson in 1907. It contains only one species, Pseudlithosia schausi, described by the same author in the same year, which is found in Jalisco, Mexico.
