= Argyrophorodes catalalis =

Scientific classification
- Kingdom: Animalia
- Phylum: Arthropoda
- Class: Insecta
- Order: Lepidoptera
- Family: Crambidae
- Genus: Argyrophorodes
- Species: A. catalalis

Binomial name
- Argyrophorodes catalalis (Marion & Viette, 1956)

Synonyms
- Nymphula catalalis Marion & Viette, 1956

Species of moth

Argyrophorodes catalalis is a species of moth of the family Crambidae. It was described by H. Marion and Pierre Viette in 1956 and is found in eastern Madagascar.

This species has a wingspan of 23 mm.
