= Ephormotris cataclystalis =

Scientific classification
- Kingdom: Animalia
- Phylum: Arthropoda
- Class: Insecta
- Order: Lepidoptera
- Family: Crambidae
- Genus: Ephormotris
- Species: E. cataclystalis

Binomial name
- Ephormotris cataclystalis (Hampson, 1897)

Synonyms
- Ambia cataclystalis Hampson, 1897; Argyractis malayalis Hampson, 1906

Species of moth

Ephormotris cataclystalis is a species of moth in the family Crambidae. It was described by George Hampson in 1897. It is found in Malaysia and on Borneo.
