= Hemiptocha atratellus =

Scientific classification
- Kingdom: Animalia
- Phylum: Arthropoda
- Class: Insecta
- Order: Lepidoptera
- Family: Crambidae
- Subfamily: Crambinae
- Tribe: incertae sedis
- Genus: Hemiptocha
- Species: H. atratellus

Binomial name
- Hemiptocha atratellus (Hampson, 1919)

Synonyms
- Crambus atratellus Hampson, 1919

Species of moth

Hemiptocha atratellus is a moth in the family Crambidae. It was described by George Hampson in 1919. It is found in Paraná, Brazil.
