= Gynenomis sericealis =

Scientific classification
- Domain: Eukaryota
- Kingdom: Animalia
- Phylum: Arthropoda
- Class: Insecta
- Order: Lepidoptera
- Family: Crambidae
- Genus: Gynenomis
- Species: G. sericealis

Binomial name
- Gynenomis sericealis (Wileman & South, 1917)

Synonyms
- Syllepte sericealis Wileman & South, 1917

Species of moth

Gynenomis sericealis is a moth in the family Crambidae. It was described by Wileman and South in 1917. It is found in Taiwan.
