= Hemiptocha argentosa =

Scientific classification
- Kingdom: Animalia
- Phylum: Arthropoda
- Class: Insecta
- Order: Lepidoptera
- Family: Crambidae
- Subfamily: Crambinae
- Tribe: incertae sedis
- Genus: Hemiptocha
- Species: H. argentosa

Binomial name
- Hemiptocha argentosa (Snellen, 1893)

Synonyms
- Chilo argentosa Snellen, 1893

Species of moth

Hemiptocha argentosa is a moth in the family Crambidae. It was described by Snellen in 1893. It is found in Argentina.
