= Tulaya staudingeri =

Scientific classification
- Domain: Eukaryota
- Kingdom: Animalia
- Phylum: Arthropoda
- Class: Insecta
- Order: Lepidoptera
- Family: Crambidae
- Genus: Tulaya
- Species: T. staudingeri

Binomial name
- Tulaya staudingeri (Bethune-Baker, 1893)

Synonyms
- Hercynella staudingeri Bethune-Baker, 1893

Species of moth

Tulaya staudingeri is a moth in the family Crambidae. It was described by George Thomas Bethune-Baker in 1893. It is found in Iran.

The length of the forewings is about 13 mm. The forewings are pale brownish ochreous, with two dark umber-brown interrupted stripes. There is a dark umber spot in the centre of the cell. The hindwings are dark greyish brown.
