= Gadessa albifrons =

Scientific classification
- Domain: Eukaryota
- Kingdom: Animalia
- Phylum: Arthropoda
- Class: Insecta
- Order: Lepidoptera
- Family: Crambidae
- Genus: Gadessa
- Species: G. albifrons

Binomial name
- Gadessa albifrons Moore, 1886

Species of moth

Gadessa albifrons is a moth in the family Crambidae. It was described by Frederic Moore in 1886. It is found in Sri Lanka.
