= Neoepicorsia furvulalis =

Scientific classification
- Domain: Eukaryota
- Kingdom: Animalia
- Phylum: Arthropoda
- Class: Insecta
- Order: Lepidoptera
- Family: Crambidae
- Genus: Neoepicorsia
- Species: N. furvulalis

Binomial name
- Neoepicorsia furvulalis Munroe, 1978

Synonyms
- Pyrausta furvalis Hampson, 1913

Species of moth

Neoepicorsia furvulalis is a moth in the family Crambidae. It was described by Eugene G. Munroe in 1978. It is found in Colombia.
