= Hutuna aurantialis =

Scientific classification
- Kingdom: Animalia
- Phylum: Arthropoda
- Class: Insecta
- Order: Lepidoptera
- Family: Crambidae
- Genus: Hutuna
- Species: H. aurantialis

Binomial name
- Hutuna aurantialis (Hampson, 1917)

Synonyms
- Piletocera aurantialis Hampson, 1917

Species of moth

Hutuna aurantialis is a moth in the family Crambidae. It was described by George Hampson in 1917. It is found on the Maluku Islands in Indonesia.
