= Heterudea grisealis =

Scientific classification
- Domain: Eukaryota
- Kingdom: Animalia
- Phylum: Arthropoda
- Class: Insecta
- Order: Lepidoptera
- Family: Crambidae
- Genus: Heterudea
- Species: H. grisealis

Binomial name
- Heterudea grisealis Dognin, 1905

Species of moth

Heterudea grisealis is a moth in the family Crambidae. It was described by Paul Dognin in 1905. It is found in Loja Province, Ecuador.
