= Anydraula pericompsa =

Scientific classification
- Domain: Eukaryota
- Kingdom: Animalia
- Phylum: Arthropoda
- Class: Insecta
- Order: Lepidoptera
- Family: Crambidae
- Genus: Anydraula
- Species: A. pericompsa

Binomial name
- Anydraula pericompsa (Turner, 1915)

Synonyms
- Cataclysta pericompsa Turner, 1915

Species of moth

Anydraula pericompsa is a moth in the family Crambidae. It is found in Australia, where it has been recorded from Queensland and the Northern Territory.
