= Otiophora leucura =

Scientific classification
- Kingdom: Animalia
- Phylum: Arthropoda
- Class: Insecta
- Order: Lepidoptera
- Family: Crambidae
- Genus: Otiophora
- Species: O. leucura

Binomial name
- Otiophora leucura (Lower, 1903)

Synonyms
- Pionea leucura Lower, 1903

Species of moth

Otiophora leucura is a moth in the family Crambidae. It was described by Oswald Bertram Lower in 1903. It is found in Australia.
