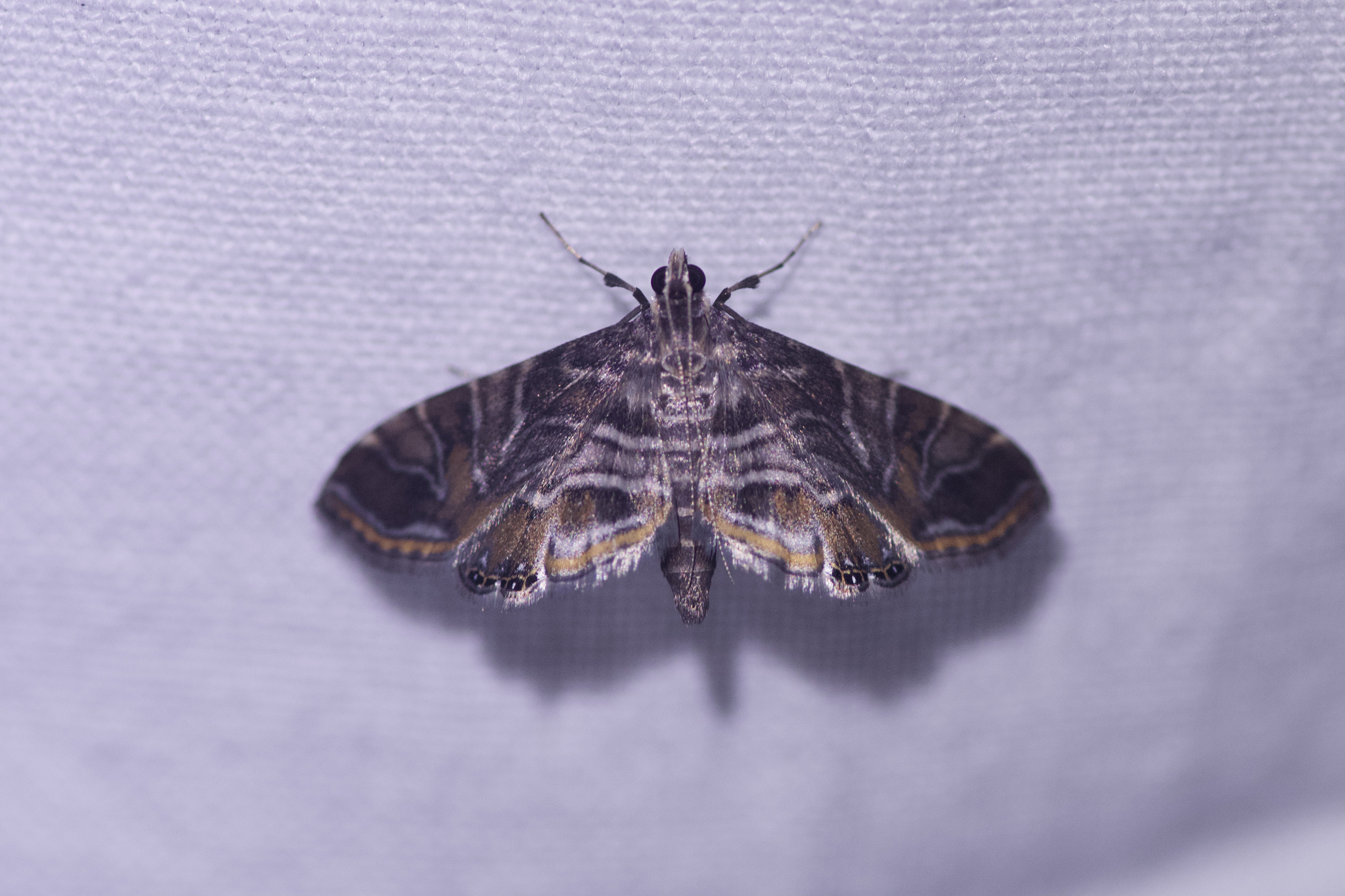
- O. profusalis observed in Panamá

Scientific classification
- Kingdom: Animalia
- Phylum: Arthropoda
- Class: Insecta
- Order: Lepidoptera
- Family: Crambidae
- Genus: Oligostigmoides
- Species: O. profusalis

Binomial name
- Oligostigmoides profusalis (Schaus, 1912)

Synonyms
- Oligostigma profusalis Schaus, 1912

= Oligostigmoides profusalis =

Species of moth

Oligostigmoides profusalis is a species of moth in the family Crambidae. It was described by Schaus in 1912. It is found in Costa Rica.
