= Neoepicorsia submundalis =

Scientific classification
- Domain: Eukaryota
- Kingdom: Animalia
- Phylum: Arthropoda
- Class: Insecta
- Order: Lepidoptera
- Family: Crambidae
- Genus: Neoepicorsia
- Species: N. submundalis

Binomial name
- Neoepicorsia submundalis (Dognin, 1905)

Synonyms
- Ebulea submundalis Dognin, 1905

Species of moth

Neoepicorsia submundalis is a moth in the family Crambidae. It was described by Paul Dognin in 1905. It is found in Loja Province, Ecuador.
