= Synclitodes =

Scientific classification
- Domain: Eukaryota
- Kingdom: Animalia
- Phylum: Arthropoda
- Class: Insecta
- Order: Lepidoptera
- Family: Crambidae
- Subfamily: Acentropinae
- Genus: Synclitodes; Munroe, 1974
- Species: S. decoripennis

Binomial name
- Synclitodes decoripennis Munroe, 1974

Genus of moths

Synclitodes is a monotypic moth genus of the family Crambidae described by Eugene G. Munroe in 1974. It contains only one species, Synclitodes decoripennis, described in the same article, which is found in Bolivia and Brazil.
