= Tamsica floricolans =

Scientific classification
- Kingdom: Animalia
- Phylum: Arthropoda
- Class: Insecta
- Order: Lepidoptera
- Family: Crambidae
- Subfamily: Crambinae
- Tribe: Diptychophorini
- Genus: Tamsica
- Species: T. floricolans

Binomial name
- Tamsica floricolans (Butler, 1883)

Synonyms
- Gesneria floricolens Butler, 1883; Hednota floricolans; Talis floricolans

Species of moth

Tamsica floricolans is a moth of the family Crambidae. It is endemic to the Hawaiian islands of Oahu, Molokai and Lanai.

Adults have been reared from whitish larvae among the roots of sugarcane. The larvae spin a frail cocoon in the soil.
