= Leucogephyra =

Scientific classification
- Domain: Eukaryota
- Kingdom: Animalia
- Phylum: Arthropoda
- Class: Insecta
- Order: Lepidoptera
- Family: Crambidae
- Subfamily: Acentropinae
- Genus: Leucogephyra; Warren, 1896
- Species: L. semifascialis

Binomial name
- Leucogephyra semifascialis (Warren, 1896)

Synonyms
- Ambia semifascialis Warren, 1896

Genus of moths

Leucogephyra is a monotypic moth genus of the family Crambidae described by William Warren in 1896. It contains only one species, Leucogephyra semifascialis, described by the same author in the same year, which is found in Assam, India.
