= Potamomusa midas =

Scientific classification
- Kingdom: Animalia
- Phylum: Arthropoda
- Class: Insecta
- Order: Lepidoptera
- Family: Crambidae
- Genus: Potamomusa
- Species: P. midas

Binomial name
- Potamomusa midas (Butler, 1881)

Synonyms
- Cataclysta midas Butler, 1881; Margarosticha midas; Neocataclysta midas

Species of moth

Potamomusa midas is a species of moth in the family Crambidae. It was described by Arthur Gardiner Butler in 1881. It is found in Japan (Honshu, Shikoku, Kyushu, Yakushima Islands), China (south to Hubei), the Russian Far East (Amur, Ussuri) and Korea.

The length of the forewings is 8.2–9.7 mm for males and 9.1–14 mm for females.

Full-grown larvae reach a length of 20–34 mm.
