= Bocchoropsis pharaxalis =

Scientific classification
- Domain: Eukaryota
- Kingdom: Animalia
- Phylum: Arthropoda
- Class: Insecta
- Order: Lepidoptera
- Family: Crambidae
- Genus: Bocchoropsis
- Species: B. pharaxalis

Binomial name
- Bocchoropsis pharaxalis (H. Druce, 1895)

Synonyms
- Pantographa pharaxalis H. Druce, 1895

Species of moth

Bocchoropsis pharaxalis is a moth in the family Crambidae. It was described by Herbert Druce in 1895. It is found in Costa Rica.

The forewings and hindwings are cream coloured, each crossed by a series of zigzag pale brown lines. The costal margin and apex of the forewings is yellowish and the marginal line of both wings is dark brown.
