= Margarochroma fuscalis =

Scientific classification
- Kingdom: Animalia
- Phylum: Arthropoda
- Class: Insecta
- Order: Lepidoptera
- Family: Crambidae
- Genus: Margarochroma
- Species: M. fuscalis

Binomial name
- Margarochroma fuscalis Hampson, 1907

Species of moth

Margarochroma fuscalis is a species of moth in the family Crambidae. It was described by George Hampson in 1907. It is found on Sulawesi.
