= Neoculladia incanelloides =

Scientific classification
- Domain: Eukaryota
- Kingdom: Animalia
- Phylum: Arthropoda
- Class: Insecta
- Order: Lepidoptera
- Family: Crambidae
- Subfamily: Crambinae
- Tribe: Crambini
- Genus: Neoculladia
- Species: N. incanelloides

Binomial name
- Neoculladia incanelloides Błeszyński, 1967

Species of moth

Neoculladia incanelloides is a moth in the family Crambidae. It was described by Stanisław Błeszyński in 1967. It is found in Trinidad.
