= Helvibotys sinaloensis =

Scientific classification
- Domain: Eukaryota
- Kingdom: Animalia
- Phylum: Arthropoda
- Class: Insecta
- Order: Lepidoptera
- Family: Crambidae
- Genus: Helvibotys
- Species: H. sinaloensis

Binomial name
- Helvibotys sinaloensis (Capps, 1967)

Synonyms
- Loxostege sinaloensis Capps, 1967

Species of moth

Helvibotys sinaloensis is a moth in the family Crambidae. It is found in Mexico (Sinaloa).

The wingspan is 15–17 mm. The fore- and hindwings are uniform brownish yellow.
