= Ephormotris =

Scientific classification
- Kingdom: Animalia
- Phylum: Arthropoda
- Class: Insecta
- Order: Lepidoptera
- Family: Crambidae
- Subfamily: Acentropinae
- Genus: Ephormotris; Meyrick, 1933

Genus of moths

Ephormortis is a genus of moths of the family Crambidae.

== Species ==
- Ephormotris cataclystalis (Hampson, 1897)
- Ephormotris dilucidalis (Guérin-Méneville, 1832)

== Former species ==
- Ephormotris nyasalis (Hampson, 1917)
