= Thysanodesma major =

Scientific classification
- Domain: Eukaryota
- Kingdom: Animalia
- Phylum: Arthropoda
- Class: Insecta
- Order: Lepidoptera
- Family: Crambidae
- Genus: Thysanodesma
- Species: T. major

Binomial name
- Thysanodesma major Butler, 1889

Species of moth

Thysanodesma major is a moth in the family Crambidae. It was described by Arthur Gardiner Butler in 1889. It is found in Himachal Pradesh, India.
