= Argyrophorodes dubiefalis =

Scientific classification
- Kingdom: Animalia
- Phylum: Arthropoda
- Class: Insecta
- Order: Lepidoptera
- Family: Crambidae
- Genus: Argyrophorodes
- Species: A. dubiefalis

Binomial name
- Argyrophorodes dubiefalis Viette, 1978

Species of moth

Argyrophorodes dubiefalis is a species of moth in the family Crambidae. It was described by Viette in 1978. It is found in Madagascar.
