= Tangla sectinotalis =

Scientific classification
- Kingdom: Animalia
- Phylum: Arthropoda
- Class: Insecta
- Order: Lepidoptera
- Family: Crambidae
- Genus: Tangla
- Species: T. sectinotalis

Binomial name
- Tangla sectinotalis (Hampson, 1898)

Synonyms
- Glyphodes sectinotalis Hampson, 1898

Species of moth

Tangla sectinotalis is a moth in the family Crambidae. It was described by George Hampson in 1898. It is found in New Guinea.
