= Callilitha =

Scientific classification
- Domain: Eukaryota
- Kingdom: Animalia
- Phylum: Arthropoda
- Class: Insecta
- Order: Lepidoptera
- Family: Crambidae
- Subfamily: Acentropinae
- Genus: Callilitha; Munroe, 1959

Genus of moths

Callilitha is a genus of moths of the family Crambidae.

== Species ==
- Callilitha boharti Munroe, 1959
- Callilitha tenaruensis Munroe, 1959
