= Helvibotys pseudohelvialis =

Scientific classification
- Domain: Eukaryota
- Kingdom: Animalia
- Phylum: Arthropoda
- Class: Insecta
- Order: Lepidoptera
- Family: Crambidae
- Genus: Helvibotys
- Species: H. pseudohelvialis

Binomial name
- Helvibotys pseudohelvialis (Capps, 1967)

Synonyms
- Loxostege pseudohelvialis Capps, 1967

Species of moth

Helvibotys pseudohelvialis is a moth in the family Crambidae described by Hahn William Capps in 1967. It is found in the United States, where it has been recorded from western Texas to Arizona and California and in Utah. It is also present in Sonora, Mexico.

The wingspan is 17–20 mm for males and 17–21 mm for females. Adults have been recorded on wing from June to September.
