= Neoculladia subincanella =

Scientific classification
- Domain: Eukaryota
- Kingdom: Animalia
- Phylum: Arthropoda
- Class: Insecta
- Order: Lepidoptera
- Family: Crambidae
- Genus: Neoculladia
- Species: N. subincanella

Binomial name
- Neoculladia subincanella Błeszyński, 1967

Species of moth

Neoculladia subincanella is a moth in the family Crambidae. It was described by Stanisław Błeszyński in 1967. It is found in Bolivia.
