= Stegothyris =

Scientific classification
- Kingdom: Animalia
- Phylum: Arthropoda
- Clade: Pancrustacea
- Class: Insecta
- Order: Lepidoptera
- Family: Crambidae
- Subfamily: Acentropinae
- Genus: Stegothyris; Lederer, 1863
- Species: S. fasciculalis

Binomial name
- Stegothyris fasciculalis (Zeller, 1852)

Synonyms
- Stenia fasciculalis Zeller, 1852; Stegothyris fascicularis Pagenstecher, 1907

Genus of moths

Stegothyris is a genus of moths of the family Crambidae. It contains only one species, Stegothyris fasciculalis, which is found in Madagascar and South Africa.

== Holotype ==
The holotype of 'Stenia fasciculalis' Zeller, 1852 is illustrated on the web pages of Swedish Museum of Natural History.
