= Ephormotris dilucidalis =

Scientific classification
- Kingdom: Animalia
- Phylum: Arthropoda
- Class: Insecta
- Order: Lepidoptera
- Family: Crambidae
- Genus: Ephormotris
- Species: E. dilucidalis

Binomial name
- Ephormotris dilucidalis (Guérin-Méneville, 1832)

Synonyms
- Botys dilucidalis Guérin-Méneville, 1832; Cataclysta dohrni E. Hering, 1903; Ephormotris octopis Meyrick, 1933

Species of moth

Ephormotris dilucidalis is a species of moth in the family Crambidae. It was described by Félix Édouard Guérin-Méneville in 1832. It is found on Sumatra and Java.
