= Tamsica hydrophila =

Scientific classification
- Kingdom: Animalia
- Phylum: Arthropoda
- Class: Insecta
- Order: Lepidoptera
- Family: Crambidae
- Subfamily: Crambinae
- Tribe: Diptychophorini
- Genus: Tamsica
- Species: T. hydrophila

Binomial name
- Tamsica hydrophila (Butler, 1882)

Synonyms
- Scotomera hydrophila Butler, 1882; Hednota hydrophila; Talis hydrophila

Species of moth

Tamsica hydrophila is a moth of the family Crambidae. It is endemic to the Hawaiian island of Oahu.
