= Trigonobela nebridopepla =

Scientific classification
- Domain: Eukaryota
- Kingdom: Animalia
- Phylum: Arthropoda
- Class: Insecta
- Order: Lepidoptera
- Family: Crambidae
- Genus: Trigonobela
- Species: T. nebridopepla

Binomial name
- Trigonobela nebridopepla Turner, 1915

Species of moth

Trigonobela nebridopepla is a moth in the family Crambidae. It was described by Turner in 1915. It is found in Australia, where it has been recorded from Queensland.

The wingspan is about 34 mm. The forewings are pale-brown with pale-fuscous markings, and pale-ochreous spots. There is a dentate transverse line and a pale-centred discal spot before the middle, as well as a dentate line from the costa, obsolete towards the dorsum, preceded and followed by some small pale-ochreous spots. There is a subterminal series of pale-fuscous spots, succeeded by a series of pale-ochreous spots. The hindwings have the same colour and markings as the forewings, but the lines are not dentate.

The larvae are thought to be internal feeders of scrub cane species.
