= Helvibotys freemani =

Scientific classification
- Domain: Eukaryota
- Kingdom: Animalia
- Phylum: Arthropoda
- Class: Insecta
- Order: Lepidoptera
- Family: Crambidae
- Genus: Helvibotys
- Species: H. freemani

Binomial name
- Helvibotys freemani Munroe, 1976

Species of moth

Helvibotys freemani is a moth in the family Crambidae described by Eugene G. Munroe in 1976. It lives in Texas, and perhaps elsewhere in North America. The wings are orange with black marginal bands which are thicker in females.
