= Bocchoropsis plenilinealis =

Scientific classification
- Kingdom: Animalia
- Phylum: Arthropoda
- Clade: Pancrustacea
- Class: Insecta
- Order: Lepidoptera
- Family: Crambidae
- Genus: Bocchoropsis
- Species: B. plenilinealis

Binomial name
- Bocchoropsis plenilinealis (Dyar, 1917)

Synonyms
- Bocchoris plenilinealis Dyar, 1917

Species of moth

Bocchoropsis plenilinealis is a moth in the family Crambidae. It was described by Harrison Gray Dyar Jr. in 1917. It is found in Guyana, French Guiana, Suriname and Cuba.

The wingspan is about 18 mm. The forewings are straw yellow with brown lines.
