= Niphostola micans =

Scientific classification
- Kingdom: Animalia
- Phylum: Arthropoda
- Class: Insecta
- Order: Lepidoptera
- Family: Crambidae
- Genus: Niphostola
- Species: N. micans

Binomial name
- Niphostola micans Hampson, 1896

Species of moth

Niphostola micans is a moth in the family Crambidae. It was described by George Hampson in 1896. It is found in India.
