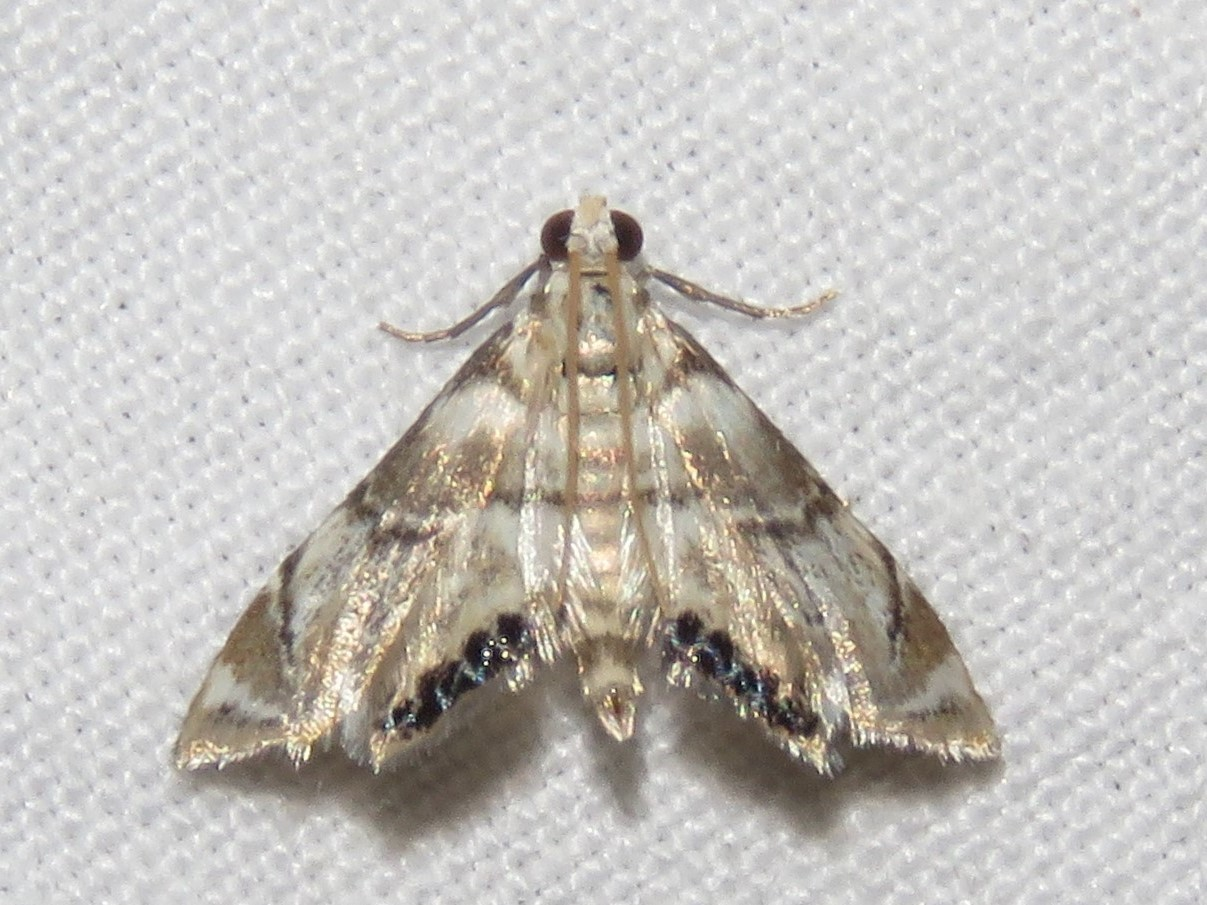

Scientific classification
- Kingdom: Animalia
- Phylum: Arthropoda
- Class: Insecta
- Order: Lepidoptera
- Family: Crambidae
- Genus: Eoparargyractis
- Species: E. plevie

Binomial name
- Eoparargyractis plevie (Dyar, 1917)

Synonyms
- Elophila plevie Dyar, 1917

= Eoparargyractis plevie =

Species of moth

Eoparargyractis plevie is a species of moth in the family Crambidae. It was described by Harrison Gray Dyar Jr. in 1917. It is found in North America, where it has been recorded from Florida, Maine, Massachusetts, New Hampshire, New York, Nova Scotia, Quebec and South Carolina.

Adults have been recorded on wing from April to October.

The larvae are aquatic and have been recorded feeding on Lobelia dortmanna, Isoetes tuckermani and Isoetes muricata. They have a yellow head. Full-grown larvae reach a length of 11 mm. The larvae have been recorded from August to mid-November. The species overwinters in the larval stage. Pupation takes place in a cocoon, which is spun on a leaf at the base of the rosette.
