= Pythagoraea =

Scientific classification
- Domain: Eukaryota
- Kingdom: Animalia
- Phylum: Arthropoda
- Class: Insecta
- Order: Lepidoptera
- Family: Crambidae
- Subfamily: Acentropinae
- Genus: Pythagoraea; Meyrick, 1929
- Species: P. categorica

Binomial name
- Pythagoraea categorica Meyrick, 1929

Synonyms
- Pythagorea Klima, 1937

Genus of moths

Pythagoraea is a genus of moths of the family Crambidae. It contains only one species, Pythagoraea categorica, which is found on the Society Islands.
