= Margarochroma pictalis =

Scientific classification
- Kingdom: Animalia
- Phylum: Arthropoda
- Class: Insecta
- Order: Lepidoptera
- Family: Crambidae
- Genus: Margarochroma
- Species: M. pictalis

Binomial name
- Margarochroma pictalis Warren, 1896

Species of moth

Margarochroma pictalis is a species of moth in the family Crambidae. It was described by Warren in 1896. It is found in India (Assam).
