= Tangla polyzonalis =

Scientific classification
- Kingdom: Animalia
- Phylum: Arthropoda
- Class: Insecta
- Order: Lepidoptera
- Family: Crambidae
- Genus: Tangla
- Species: T. polyzonalis

Binomial name
- Tangla polyzonalis (Hampson, 1898)

Synonyms
- Glyphodes polyzonalis Hampson, 1898

Species of moth

Tangla polyzonalis is a moth in the family Crambidae. It was described by George Hampson in 1898. It is found on Ambon Island in Indonesia and Fergusson Island in Papua New Guinea.
