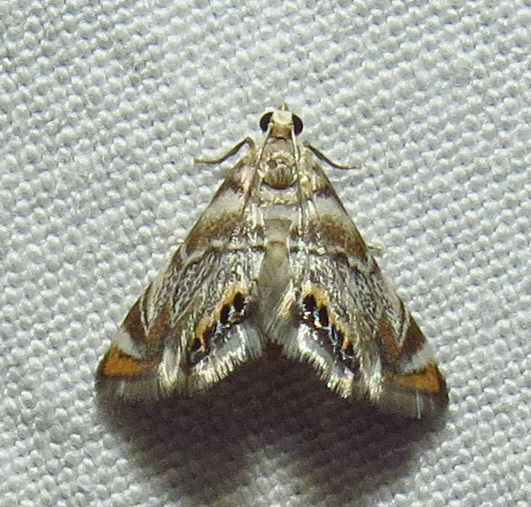

Scientific classification
- Kingdom: Animalia
- Phylum: Arthropoda
- Class: Insecta
- Order: Lepidoptera
- Family: Crambidae
- Genus: Eoparargyractis
- Species: E. irroratalis

Binomial name
- Eoparargyractis irroratalis (Dyar, 1917)

Synonyms
- Elophila irroratalis Dyar, 1917

= Eoparargyractis irroratalis =

Species of moth

Eoparargyractis irroratalis is a species of moth in the family Crambidae. It was described by Harrison Gray Dyar Jr. in 1917. It is found in North America, where it has been recorded from Alabama, British Columbia, Florida, Georgia, Maryland, Montana and South Carolina.

Adults have been recorded on wing nearly year round in the southern part of the range.
