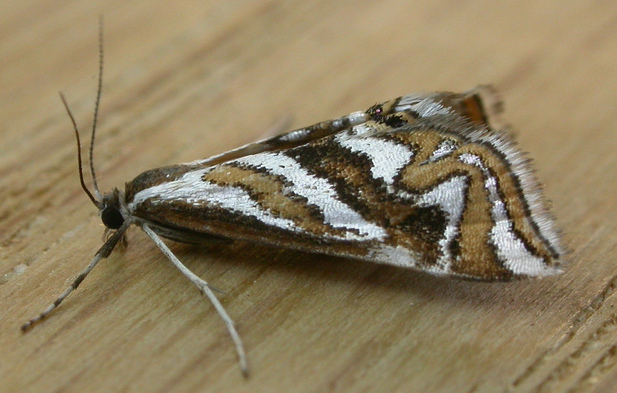
- Anydraula glycerialis

Scientific classification
- Domain: Eukaryota
- Kingdom: Animalia
- Phylum: Arthropoda
- Class: Insecta
- Order: Lepidoptera
- Family: Crambidae
- Subfamily: Acentropinae
- Genus: Anydraula; Meyrick, 1885

= Anydraula =

Genus of moths

Anydraula is a genus of moths belonging to the family Crambidae.

== Species ==
- Anydraula glycerialis (Walker, 1859)
- Anydraula pericompsa (Turner, 1915)
