= Argyrophorodes angolensis =

Scientific classification
- Kingdom: Animalia
- Phylum: Arthropoda
- Clade: Pancrustacea
- Class: Insecta
- Order: Lepidoptera
- Family: Crambidae
- Genus: Argyrophorodes
- Species: A. angolensis

Binomial name
- Argyrophorodes angolensis Agassiz, 2012

Species of moth

Argyrophorodes angolensis is a species of moth in the family Crambidae. It was described by David John Lawrence Agassiz in 2012. It is found in Angola, the Democratic Republic of the Congo and Zambia.

The wingspan is 18–19 mm. Adults have been recorded on wing in March and May.

== Etymology ==
The species is named for the country of Angola, where many specimens originate.
