= Margarochroma =

Scientific classification
- Domain: Eukaryota
- Kingdom: Animalia
- Phylum: Arthropoda
- Class: Insecta
- Order: Lepidoptera
- Family: Crambidae
- Subfamily: Acentropinae
- Genus: Margarochroma; Warren, 1896

Genus of moths

Margarochroma is a genus of moths of the family Crambidae.

== Species ==
- Margarochroma fuscalis Hampson, 1907
- Margarochroma pictalis Warren, 1896
