= Oligostigmoides peruviensis =

Scientific classification
- Kingdom: Animalia
- Phylum: Arthropoda
- Class: Insecta
- Order: Lepidoptera
- Family: Crambidae
- Genus: Oligostigmoides
- Species: O. peruviensis

Binomial name
- Oligostigmoides peruviensis (Hampson, 1917)

Synonyms
- Oligostigma peruviensis Hampson, 1917

Species of moth

Oligostigmoides peruviensis is a species of moth in the family Crambidae. It is found in Peru.
