= Hyperectis apicalis =

Scientific classification
- Kingdom: Animalia
- Phylum: Arthropoda
- Class: Insecta
- Order: Lepidoptera
- Family: Crambidae
- Genus: Hyperectis
- Species: H. apicalis

Binomial name
- Hyperectis apicalis Hampson, 1912

Species of moth

Hyperectis apicalis is a moth in the family Crambidae. It was described by George Hampson in 1912. It is found in Ecuador.
