= Tamsica oxyptera =

Scientific classification
- Kingdom: Animalia
- Phylum: Arthropoda
- Class: Insecta
- Order: Lepidoptera
- Family: Crambidae
- Subfamily: Crambinae
- Tribe: Diptychophorini
- Genus: Tamsica
- Species: T. oxyptera

Binomial name
- Tamsica oxyptera (Meyrick, 1888)

Synonyms
- Hednota oxyptera Meyrick, 1888; Talis oxyptera

Species of moth

Tamsica oxyptera is a moth of the family Crambidae. It is endemic to the Hawaiian island of Oahu.
