= Potamomusa aquilonia =

Scientific classification
- Kingdom: Animalia
- Phylum: Arthropoda
- Clade: Pancrustacea
- Class: Insecta
- Order: Lepidoptera
- Family: Crambidae
- Genus: Potamomusa
- Species: P. aquilonia

Binomial name
- Potamomusa aquilonia Yoshiyasu, 1985

Species of moth

Potamomusa aquilonia is a species of moth in the family Crambidae. It was described by Yoshiyasu in 1985. It is found in Japan (Hokkaido).
