= Torqueola monophaes =

Scientific classification
- Domain: Eukaryota
- Kingdom: Animalia
- Phylum: Arthropoda
- Class: Insecta
- Order: Lepidoptera
- Family: Crambidae
- Genus: Torqueola
- Species: T. monophaes

Binomial name
- Torqueola monophaes (Lower, 1902)

Synonyms
- Pionea monophaes Lower, 1902

Species of moth

Torqueola monophaes is a moth in the family Crambidae. It was described by Oswald Bertram Lower in 1902. It is found in Australia.
