= Nephelolychnis velata =

Scientific classification
- Domain: Eukaryota
- Kingdom: Animalia
- Phylum: Arthropoda
- Class: Insecta
- Order: Lepidoptera
- Family: Crambidae
- Genus: Nephelolychnis
- Species: N. velata

Binomial name
- Nephelolychnis velata Meyrick, 1933

Species of moth

Nephelolychnis velata is a moth in the family Crambidae. It was described by Edward Meyrick in 1933. It is found in the Democratic Republic of the Congo.
