= Gynenomis mindanaoensis =

Scientific classification
- Domain: Eukaryota
- Kingdom: Animalia
- Phylum: Arthropoda
- Class: Insecta
- Order: Lepidoptera
- Family: Crambidae
- Genus: Gynenomis
- Species: G. mindanaoensis

Binomial name
- Gynenomis mindanaoensis Munroe & Mutuura, 1968

Species of moth

Gynenomis mindanaoensis is a moth in the family Crambidae. It was described by Eugene G. Munroe and Akira Mutuura in 1968. It is found on Mindanao in the Philippines.
