= Neoepicorsia daucalis =

Scientific classification
- Kingdom: Animalia
- Phylum: Arthropoda
- Class: Insecta
- Order: Lepidoptera
- Family: Crambidae
- Genus: Neoepicorsia
- Species: N. daucalis

Binomial name
- Neoepicorsia daucalis Munroe, 1964

Species of moth

Neoepicorsia daucalis is a moth in the family Crambidae. It was described by Eugene G. Munroe in 1964. It is found in the Amazonas state of Brazil.
