= Kasania =

Scientific classification
- Domain: Eukaryota
- Kingdom: Animalia
- Phylum: Arthropoda
- Class: Insecta
- Order: Lepidoptera
- Family: Crambidae
- Subfamily: Acentropinae
- Genus: Kasania; Krulikovsky, 1910
- Species: K. arundinalis

Binomial name
- Kasania arundinalis (Eversmann, 1842)

Synonyms
- Pyrausta arundinalis Eversmann, 1842

Genus of moths

Kasania is a monotypic moth genus of the family Crambidae described by Leonid Konstantinovich Krulikovsky in 1910. It contains only one species, Kasania arundinalis, described by Eduard Friedrich Eversmann in 1842, which is found in Poland, Ukraine and Russia.

The wingspan is 12–14 mm. Adults are on wing from May to August.
