= Tulaya margelana =

Scientific classification
- Domain: Eukaryota
- Kingdom: Animalia
- Phylum: Arthropoda
- Class: Insecta
- Order: Lepidoptera
- Family: Crambidae
- Genus: Tulaya
- Species: T. margelana

Binomial name
- Tulaya margelana (Bethune-Baker, 1893)

Synonyms
- Hercynella margelana Bethune-Baker, 1893

Species of moth

Tulaya margelana is a moth in the family Crambidae. It was described by George Thomas Bethune-Baker in 1893. It is found in Iran.

The length of the forewings is 12–13 mm. The forewings are dirty ash grey, with a black curved stripe between the base of the wing and the centre. There is a black spot near the costa beyond the centre, followed by an oblique, curved, black stripe from the costa to the inner margin, just beyond this is a small black dash near the anal angle. The hindmargin is darkly dotted and the extreme base of the wings is blackish. The whole wing is covered with rough, dark grey scales. The hindwings are brownish grey with a line of dark shading near the posterior margin, which is finely bordered with black.
