= Neoepicorsia claudiusalis =

Scientific classification
- Kingdom: Animalia
- Phylum: Arthropoda
- Class: Insecta
- Order: Lepidoptera
- Family: Crambidae
- Genus: Neoepicorsia
- Species: N. claudiusalis

Binomial name
- Neoepicorsia claudiusalis (Walker, 1859)

Synonyms
- Botys claudiusalis Walker, 1859; Pyrausta fulviflavalis Hampson, 1918

Species of moth

Neoepicorsia claudiusalis is a moth in the family Crambidae. It was described by Francis Walker in 1859. It is found in Brazil and Argentina.
