= Neoepicorsia confusa =

Scientific classification
- Domain: Eukaryota
- Kingdom: Animalia
- Phylum: Arthropoda
- Class: Insecta
- Order: Lepidoptera
- Family: Crambidae
- Genus: Neoepicorsia
- Species: N. confusa

Binomial name
- Neoepicorsia confusa Munroe, 1964

Species of moth

Neoepicorsia confusa is a moth in the family Crambidae. It was described by Eugene G. Munroe in 1964. It is found in Santa Catarina, Brazil.
