= Toxobotys praestans =

Scientific classification
- Domain: Eukaryota
- Kingdom: Animalia
- Phylum: Arthropoda
- Class: Insecta
- Order: Lepidoptera
- Family: Crambidae
- Genus: Toxobotys
- Species: T. praestans

Binomial name
- Toxobotys praestans Munroe & Mutuura, 1968

Species of moth

Toxobotys praestans is a moth in the family Crambidae. It was described by Eugene G. Munroe and Akira Mutuura in 1968. It is found in Hainan, China.
