= Neoculladia incanellus =

Scientific classification
- Kingdom: Animalia
- Phylum: Arthropoda
- Clade: Pancrustacea
- Class: Insecta
- Order: Lepidoptera
- Family: Crambidae
- Subfamily: Crambinae
- Tribe: Crambini
- Genus: Neoculladia
- Species: N. incanellus

Binomial name
- Neoculladia incanellus (Zeller, 1877)

Synonyms
- Crambus incanellus Zeller, 1877

Species of moth

Neoculladia incanellus is a moth in the family Crambidae. It was described by Zeller in 1877. It is found in Brazil.
