= Nothomastix pronaxalis =

Scientific classification
- Kingdom: Animalia
- Phylum: Arthropoda
- Class: Insecta
- Order: Lepidoptera
- Family: Crambidae
- Genus: Nothomastix
- Species: N. pronaxalis

Binomial name
- Nothomastix pronaxalis (Walker, 1859)

Synonyms
- Botys pronaxalis Walker, 1859; Pardomima acutalis Hampson, 1893

Species of moth

Nothomastix pronaxalis is a moth in the family Crambidae. It was described by Francis Walker in 1859. It is found on Borneo.
