= Tamsica hyacinthina =

Scientific classification
- Kingdom: Animalia
- Phylum: Arthropoda
- Class: Insecta
- Order: Lepidoptera
- Family: Crambidae
- Subfamily: Crambinae
- Tribe: Diptychophorini
- Genus: Tamsica
- Species: T. hyacinthina

Binomial name
- Tamsica hyacinthina (Meyrick, 1899)

Synonyms
- Talis hyacinthina Meyrick, 1899

Species of moth

Tamsica hyacinthina is a moth of the family Crambidae. It is endemic to the Hawaiian islands of Oahu and Hawaii.
