= Toxobotys aureans =

Scientific classification
- Domain: Eukaryota
- Kingdom: Animalia
- Phylum: Arthropoda
- Class: Insecta
- Order: Lepidoptera
- Family: Crambidae
- Genus: Toxobotys
- Species: T. aureans

Binomial name
- Toxobotys aureans Rose & Kirti, 1989

Species of moth

Toxobotys aureans is a moth in the family Crambidae. It was described by Rose and Kirti in 1989. It is found in India (Khasi Hills).
