= Niphostola punctata =

Scientific classification
- Kingdom: Animalia
- Phylum: Arthropoda
- Class: Insecta
- Order: Lepidoptera
- Family: Crambidae
- Genus: Niphostola
- Species: N. punctata

Binomial name
- Niphostola punctata C. Swinhoe, 1904

Species of moth

Niphostola punctata is a moth in the family Crambidae. It was described by Charles Swinhoe in 1904. It is found on Borneo.
