= Thysanodesma praeteritalis =

Scientific classification
- Kingdom: Animalia
- Phylum: Arthropoda
- Class: Insecta
- Order: Lepidoptera
- Family: Crambidae
- Genus: Thysanodesma
- Species: T. praeteritalis

Binomial name
- Thysanodesma praeteritalis (Walker, 1859)

Synonyms
- Asopia praeteritalis Walker, 1859

Species of moth

Thysanodesma praeteritalis is a moth in the family Crambidae. It was described by Francis Walker in 1859. It is found in Sri Lanka.
