= Nothomastix obliquifascialis =

Scientific classification
- Kingdom: Animalia
- Phylum: Arthropoda
- Class: Insecta
- Order: Lepidoptera
- Family: Crambidae
- Genus: Nothomastix
- Species: N. obliquifascialis

Binomial name
- Nothomastix obliquifascialis Hampson, 1896

Species of moth

Nothomastix obliquifascialis is a moth in the family Crambidae. It was described by George Hampson in 1896. It is found in Myanmar.
