= Tangla zangisalis =

Scientific classification
- Kingdom: Animalia
- Phylum: Arthropoda
- Class: Insecta
- Order: Lepidoptera
- Family: Crambidae
- Genus: Tangla
- Species: T. zangisalis

Binomial name
- Tangla zangisalis (Walker, 1859)

Synonyms
- Glyphodes zangisalis Walker, 1859

Species of moth

Tangla zangisalis is a moth in the family Crambidae. It was described by Francis Walker in 1859. It is found in Assam, India and on Borneo.
