= Nothomastix pyranthes =

Scientific classification
- Kingdom: Animalia
- Phylum: Arthropoda
- Class: Insecta
- Order: Lepidoptera
- Family: Crambidae
- Genus: Nothomastix
- Species: N. pyranthes

Binomial name
- Nothomastix pyranthes (Meyrick, 1894)

Synonyms
- Notarcha pyranthes Meyrick, 1894

Species of moth

Nothomastix pyranthes is a moth in the family Crambidae. It was described by Edward Meyrick in 1894. It is found on Borneo.
