= Hemiptocha chalcostomus =

Scientific classification
- Kingdom: Animalia
- Phylum: Arthropoda
- Class: Insecta
- Order: Lepidoptera
- Family: Crambidae
- Subfamily: Crambinae
- Tribe: incertae sedis
- Genus: Hemiptocha
- Species: H. chalcostomus

Binomial name
- Hemiptocha chalcostomus (Dyar, 1916)

Synonyms
- Crambus chalcostomus Dyar, 1916

Species of moth

Hemiptocha chalcostomus is a moth in the family Crambidae. It was described by Harrison Gray Dyar Jr. in 1916. It is found in Mexico.
