= Torqueola ophiceralis =

Scientific classification
- Kingdom: Animalia
- Phylum: Arthropoda
- Class: Insecta
- Order: Lepidoptera
- Family: Crambidae
- Genus: Torqueola
- Species: T. ophiceralis

Binomial name
- Torqueola ophiceralis (Walker, 1866)

Synonyms
- Botys ophiceralis Walker, 1866

Species of moth

Torqueola ophiceralis is a moth in the family Crambidae. It was described by Francis Walker, in 1866. It is found in Java, Indonesia.
