= USS Pensacola (AK-7) =

Cargo ship of the United States Navy

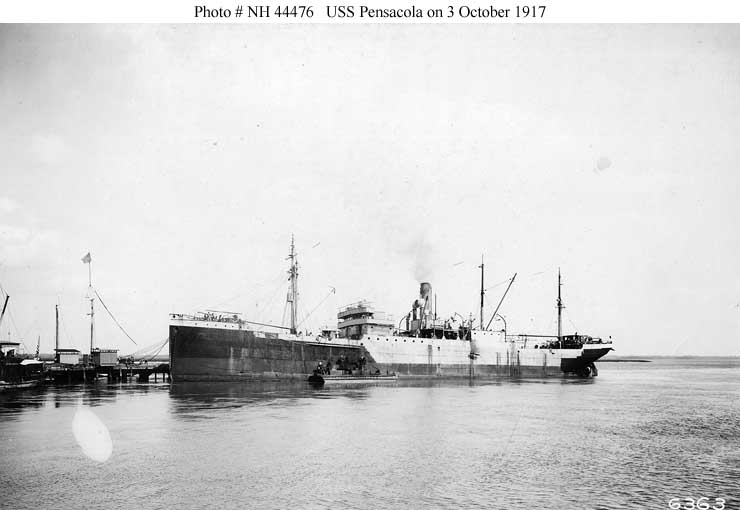
- At the Charleston, South Carolina, Navy Yard on 3 October 1917, five days before her commissioning. Formerly the German Nicaria, seized by the United States in April 1917, Pensacola was designated AK-7 in 1920.

History

German Empire
- Name: Nicaria
- Namesake: The moth genus Nicaria
- Builder: Neptun Werft, Rostock, Germany
- Launched: 18 August 1901
- Fate: Seized by the US government, 8 May 1917, at Southport, North Carolina
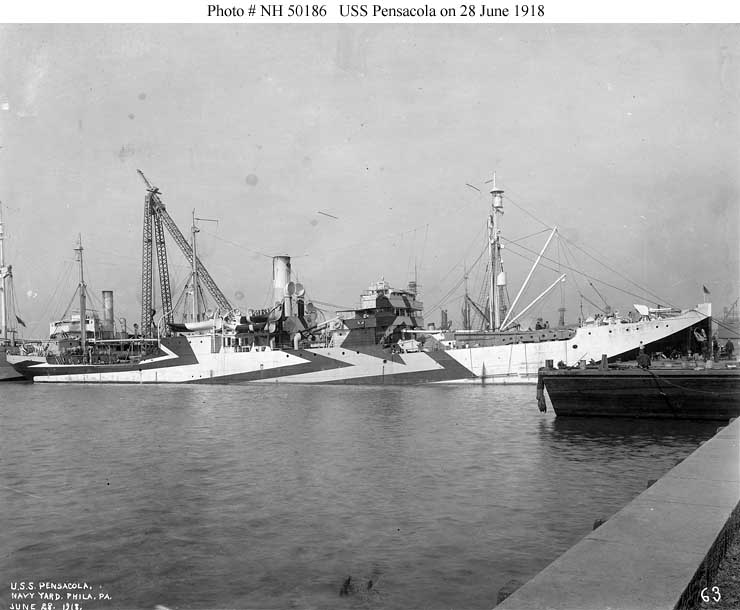
- USS Pensacola (ID 2078) moored pierside at Philadelphia Navy Yard, 28 June 1918.

United States
- Name: Pensacola
- Namesake: Pensacola, Florida
- Acquired: 9 June 1917
- Commissioned: 8 October 1917, as USS Pensacola (SP-2078)
- Decommissioned: 14 March 1925
- Reclassified: 17 July 1920, as USS Pensacola (AK-7); 26 June 1922, as USS Pensacola (AG-13)
- Stricken: 14 March 1925
- Identification: Hull symbol:SP-2078; Hull symbol:AK-7; Hull symbol:AK-13
- Fate: Sold, 5 August 1925, to M. M. Davidson of Stockton, California

General characteristics
- Displacement: 9,821 long tons (9,979 t) normal
- Length: 353 ft 11 in (107.87 m)
- Beam: 51 ft (16 m)
- Draft: 21 ft 6 in (6.55 m)
- Propulsion: steam
- Speed: 9.5 knots (17.6 km/h; 10.9 mph)
- Complement: 144 officers and enlisted
- Armament: 1 × 4 in (100 mm) gun; 1 × 3 in (76 mm) gun

USS Pensacola (AK-7/AG-13) was a cargo ship in the United States Navy.

Pensacola was originally the German screw steamer Nicaria, launched in Rostock, Germany on 18 August 1901. She was seized by the U.S. government at Southport, North Carolina, on 8 May 1917. She was transferred to the United States Navy on 9 June 1917, and commissioned on 8 October 1917.

Assigned to the Naval Overseas Transport Service in January 1918, Pensacola carried supplies from the United States to French and British ports. Returning from Brest to Philadelphia on 2 December 1918, she steamed to New York and sailed for Turkey on 25 January 1919 with a cargo for the Syrian-Armenian Relief, arriving at Constantinople on 12 March. Following her return to the United States on 15 April, Pensacola carried passengers and cargo to bases in the Caribbean. Returning to Norfolk on 9 June 1919, she was reassigned to the Navy Trans-Pacific transport service.

She operated in the Pacific until becoming a station ship at Guam 15 March 1922. Classified AK-7 (Cargo Ship) on 17 July 1920, Pensacola was reclassified AG-13 (Miscellaneous Auxiliary) on 26 June 1922.

She decommissioned at Mare Island, California on 14 March 1925, was struck from the Navy Register the same day, and was sold to M. Davidson of Stockton, California, on 5 August 1925.
