= Tetrernia tetrommata =

Scientific classification
- Kingdom: Animalia
- Phylum: Arthropoda
- Class: Insecta
- Order: Lepidoptera
- Family: Crambidae
- Genus: Tetrernia
- Species: T. tetrommata

Binomial name
- Tetrernia tetrommata (Hampson, 1906)

Synonyms
- Metaclysta tetrommata Hampson, 1906

Species of moth

Tetrernia tetrommata is a species of moth in the family Crambidae. It was described by George Hampson in 1906. It is found on the Louisiade Archipelago in Papua New Guinea.
