= Tangla (moth) =

Scientific classification
- Domain: Eukaryota
- Kingdom: Animalia
- Phylum: Arthropoda
- Class: Insecta
- Order: Lepidoptera
- Family: Crambidae
- Subfamily: Pyraustinae
- Genus: Tangla; C. Swinhoe, 1900

Genus of moths

Tangla is a genus of moths of the family Crambidae. The genus was erected by Charles Swinhoe in 1900.

== Species ==
- Tangla polyzonalis (Hampson, 1898)
- Tangla sectinotalis (Hampson, 1898)
- Tangla zangisalis (Walker, 1859)
