= Toxobotys =

Scientific classification
- Domain: Eukaryota
- Kingdom: Animalia
- Phylum: Arthropoda
- Class: Insecta
- Order: Lepidoptera
- Family: Crambidae
- Subfamily: Pyraustinae
- Genus: Toxobotys; Munroe & Mutuura, 1968

Genus of moths

Toxobotys is a genus of moths of the family Crambidae.

== Species ==
- Toxobotys aureans Rose & Kirti, 1989
- Toxobotys boveyi Bänziger, 1987
- Toxobotys praestans Munroe & Mutuura, 1968
