= Trichoceraea =

Scientific classification
- Domain: Eukaryota
- Kingdom: Animalia
- Phylum: Arthropoda
- Class: Insecta
- Order: Lepidoptera
- Family: Crambidae
- Subfamily: Pyraustinae
- Genus: Trichoceraea; Sauber in Semper, 1902
- Species: T. semperi

Binomial name
- Trichoceraea semperi Sauber in Semper, 1902

Genus of moths

Trichoceraea is a genus of moths of the family Crambidae. It contains only one species, Trichoceraea semperi, which is found in the Philippines.
