= Neoepicorsia =

Scientific classification
- Domain: Eukaryota
- Kingdom: Animalia
- Phylum: Arthropoda
- Class: Insecta
- Order: Lepidoptera
- Family: Crambidae
- Subfamily: Pyraustinae
- Genus: Neoepicorsia; Munroe, 1964

Genus of moths

Neoepicorsia is a genus of moths of the family Crambidae.

== Species ==
- Neoepicorsia claudiusalis (Walker, 1859)
- Neoepicorsia confusa Munroe, 1964
- Neoepicorsia daucalis Munroe, 1964
- Neoepicorsia furvulalis Munroe, 1978
- Neoepicorsia fuscalis Munroe, 1978
- Neoepicorsia submundalis (Dognin, 1905)
- Neoepicorsia tuisalis (Schaus, 1912)
