= Trigonobela =

Scientific classification
- Domain: Eukaryota
- Kingdom: Animalia
- Phylum: Arthropoda
- Class: Insecta
- Order: Lepidoptera
- Family: Crambidae
- Subfamily: Spilomelinae
- Genus: Trigonobela; Turner, 1915

Genus of moths

Trigonobela is a genus of moths of the family Crambidae described by Alfred Jefferis Turner in 1915.

== Species ==
- Trigonobela nebridopepla Turner, 1915
- Trigonobela perfenestrata (Butler, 1882)
