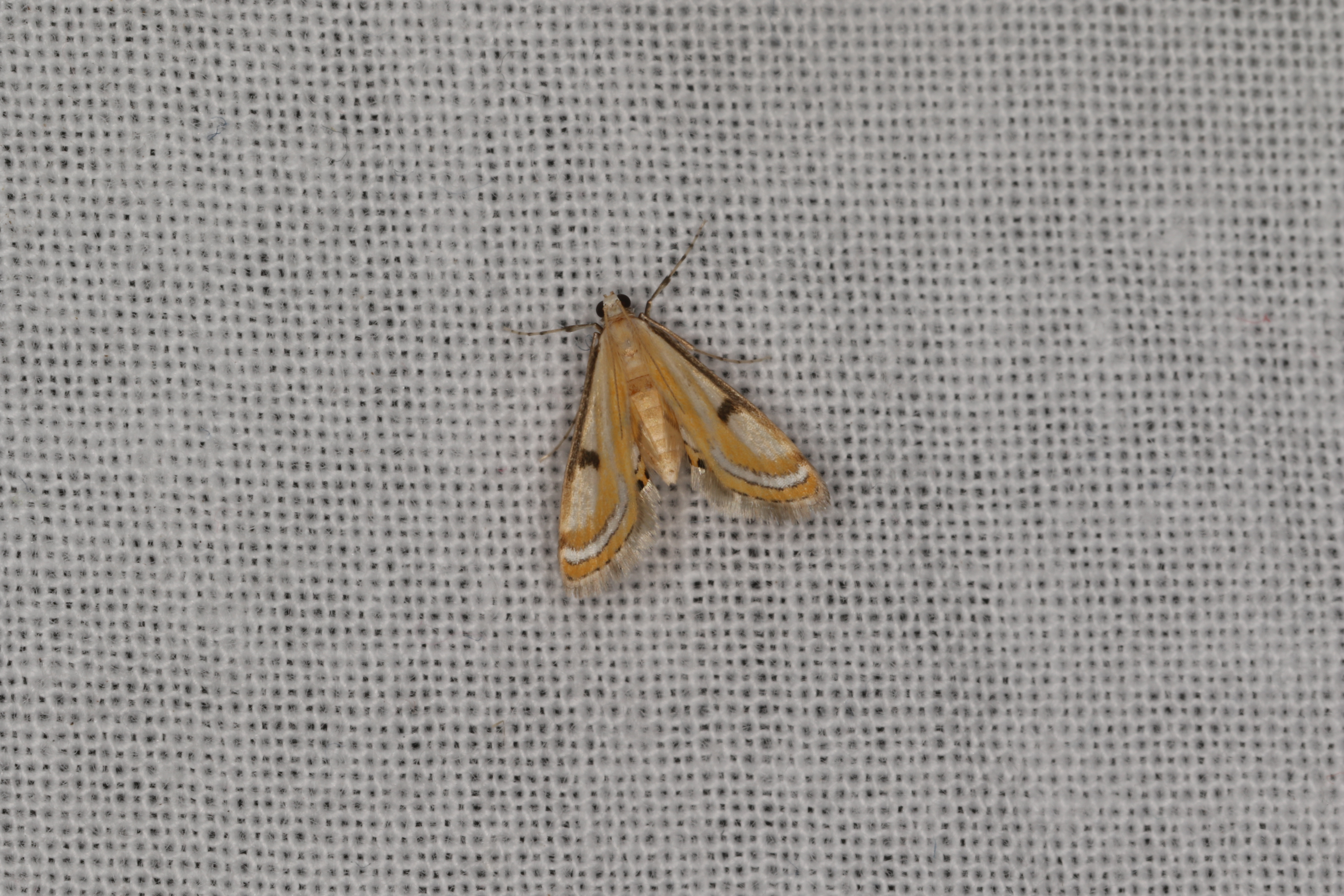
- Tetrernia terminitis

Scientific classification
- Kingdom: Animalia
- Phylum: Arthropoda
- Class: Insecta
- Order: Lepidoptera
- Family: Crambidae
- Subfamily: Acentropinae
- Genus: Tetrernia; Meyrick, 1890

Synonyms
- Metaclysta Hampson, 1906

= Tetrernia =

Genus of moths

Tetrernia is a genus of moths of the family Crambidae.

== Species ==
- Tetrernia terminitis Meyrick, 1890
- Tetrernia tetrommata Hampson, 1906
