= Otiophora (moth) =

Scientific classification
- Kingdom: Animalia
- Phylum: Arthropoda
- Class: Insecta
- Order: Lepidoptera
- Family: Crambidae
- Subfamily: Spilomelinae
- Genus: Otiophora; Turner, 1908

Genus of moths

Otiophora is a genus of moths of the family Crambidae first described by Alfred Jefferis Turner in 1908.

== Species ==
- Otiophora clavifera (Hampson, 1899)
- Otiophora leucotypa (Lower, 1903)
- Otiophora leucura (Lower, 1903)
