= Thevitella =

Scientific classification
- Kingdom: Animalia
- Phylum: Arthropoda
- Class: Insecta
- Order: Lepidoptera
- Family: Crambidae
- Subfamily: Acentropinae
- Genus: Thevitella; Viette, 1958
- Species: T. alphalis

Binomial name
- Thevitella alphalis Viette, 1958

Genus of moths

Thevitella is a genus of moths of the family Crambidae. It contains only one species, Thevitella alphalis, which is found in Madagascar.
