= Thysanodesma =

Scientific classification
- Domain: Eukaryota
- Kingdom: Animalia
- Phylum: Arthropoda
- Class: Insecta
- Order: Lepidoptera
- Family: Crambidae
- Subfamily: Pyraustinae
- Genus: Thysanodesma; Butler, 1889

Genus of moths

Thysanodesma is a genus of moths of the family Crambidae.

== Species ==
- Thysanodesma major Butler, 1889
- Thysanodesma praeteritalis (Walker, 1859)
