= Bocchoropsis =

Scientific classification
- Domain: Eukaryota
- Kingdom: Animalia
- Phylum: Arthropoda
- Class: Insecta
- Order: Lepidoptera
- Family: Crambidae
- Tribe: Agroterini
- Genus: Bocchoropsis; Amsel, 1956

Genus of moths

Bocchoropsis is a genus of moths of the family Crambidae.

== Species ==
- Bocchoropsis pharaxalis (Druce, 1895)
- Bocchoropsis plenilinealis (Dyar, 1917)
