= Hedyleptopsis =

Scientific classification
- Kingdom: Animalia
- Phylum: Arthropoda
- Class: Insecta
- Order: Lepidoptera
- Family: Crambidae
- Subfamily: Spilomelinae
- Genus: Hedyleptopsis; Munroe, 1960
- Species: H. flava

Binomial name
- Hedyleptopsis flava Munroe, 1960

Genus of moths

Hedyleptopsis is a genus of moths of the family Crambidae. It contains only one species, Hedyleptopsis flava, which is found in Indonesia (Sulawesi).
