= Teratausta =

Scientific classification
- Domain: Eukaryota
- Kingdom: Animalia
- Phylum: Arthropoda
- Class: Insecta
- Order: Lepidoptera
- Family: Crambidae
- Subfamily: Acentropinae
- Genus: Teratausta; Hampson, 1903
- Species: T. odontalis

Binomial name
- Teratausta odontalis Hampson, 1903

Genus of moths

Teratausta is a monotypic moth genus of the family Crambidae described by George Hampson in 1903. It contains only one species, Teratausta odontalis, described in the same article, which is found in Silhet, Bangladesh.
