= Glyphandra =

Scientific classification
- Domain: Eukaryota
- Kingdom: Animalia
- Phylum: Arthropoda
- Class: Insecta
- Order: Lepidoptera
- Family: Crambidae
- Subfamily: Acentropinae
- Genus: Glyphandra; Karsch, 1900
- Species: G. biincisalis

Binomial name
- Glyphandra biincisalis Karsch, 1900

Genus of moths

Glyphandra is a monotypic moth genus of the family Crambidae described by Ferdinand Karsch in 1900. It contains only one species, Glyphandra biincisalis, described by the same author in the same year. It is found in Cameroon, Equatorial Guinea and Togo.
