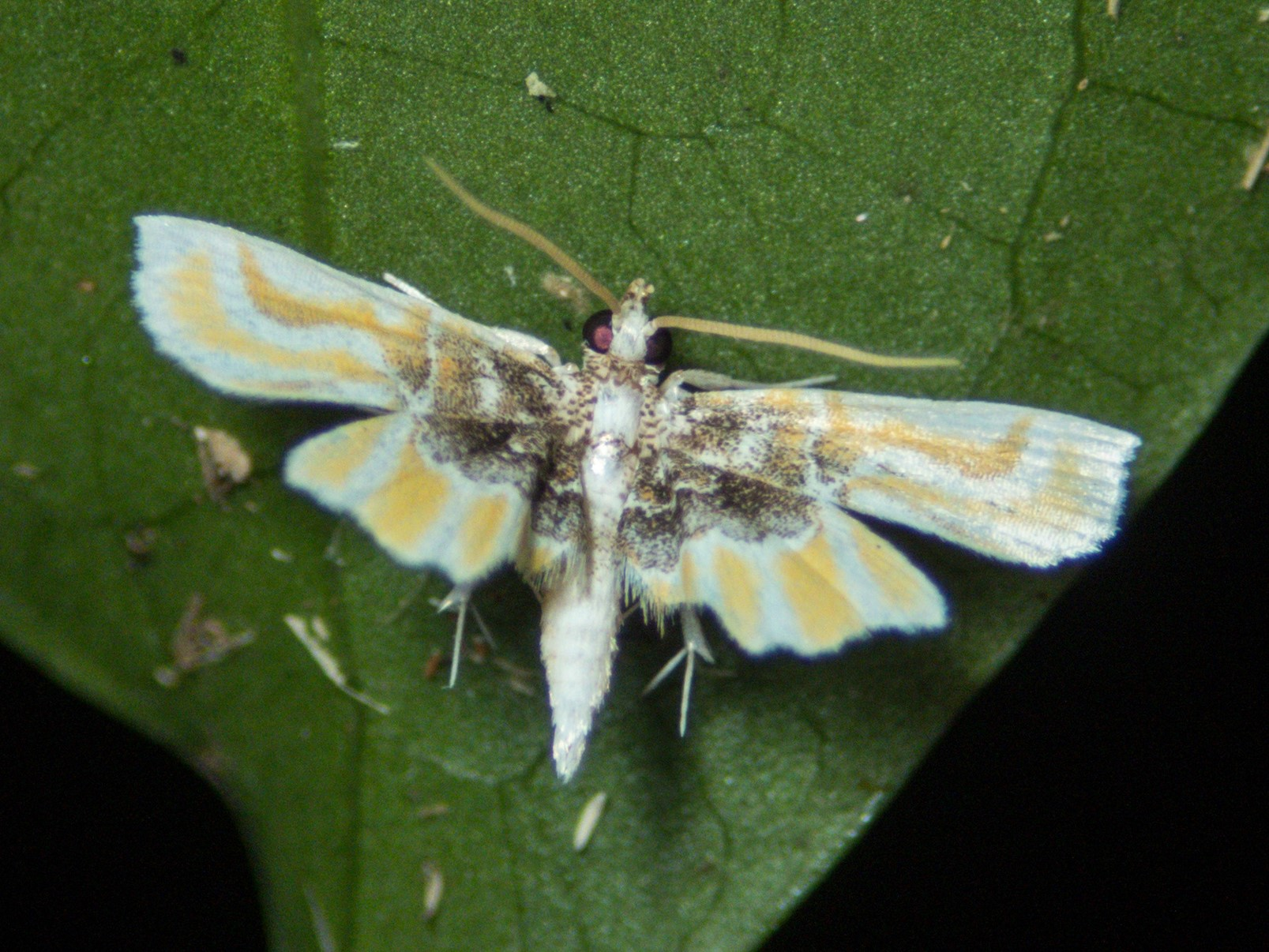

Scientific classification
- Kingdom: Animalia
- Phylum: Arthropoda
- Clade: Pancrustacea
- Class: Insecta
- Order: Lepidoptera
- Family: Crambidae
- Subfamily: Acentropinae
- Genus: Oligernis; Meyrick, 1894
- Species: O. endophthalma

Binomial name
- Oligernis endophthalma Meyrick, 1894

Synonyms
- Ambia endophthalma Meyrick, 1894

= Oligernis =

Oligernis endophthalma

Genus of moths

Oligernis is a genus of moths in the family Crambidae. It contains only one species, Oligernis endophthalma, which is found on Borneo.
