= Helvibotys =

Scientific classification
- Kingdom: Animalia
- Phylum: Arthropoda
- Class: Insecta
- Order: Lepidoptera
- Family: Crambidae
- Subfamily: Pyraustinae
- Genus: Helvibotys; Munroe, 1976

Genus of moths

Helvibotys is a genus of moths of the family Crambidae.

== Species ==
- Helvibotys freemani
- Helvibotys helvialis (Walker, 1859)
- Helvibotys pseudohelvialis
- Helvibotys pucilla
- Helvibotys sinaloensis
