= Compsophila =

Scientific classification
- Kingdom: Animalia
- Phylum: Arthropoda
- Class: Insecta
- Order: Lepidoptera
- Family: Crambidae
- Subfamily: Acentropinae
- Genus: Compsophila; Meyrick, 1886
- Species: C. iocosma

Binomial name
- Compsophila iocosma Meyrick, 1886

Synonyms
- Niphadaza Butler, 1886; Niphadaza bicolor Butler, 1886

Genus of moths

Compsophila is a genus of moths of the family Crambidae. It contains only one species, Compsophila iocosma, which is found on Fiji.

The wingspan is about 24 millimeters, the forewings rust-red in color and the hindwings snow-white with a large rust-red subbasal spot, a broad discal band, and a small oblique spot near the middle of the outer margin.
