= Galadra =

Scientific classification
- Domain: Eukaryota
- Kingdom: Animalia
- Phylum: Arthropoda
- Class: Insecta
- Order: Lepidoptera
- Family: Crambidae
- Subfamily: Acentropinae
- Genus: Galadra; Walker, 1865
- Species: G. rhomboidata

Binomial name
- Galadra rhomboidata Walker, 1865

Genus of moths

Galadra is a monotypic moth genus of the family Crambidae described by Francis Walker in 1865. It contains only one species, Galadra rhomboidata, described by the same author in the same year, which is found in New Guinea.
