= Tanaophysopsis =

Scientific classification
- Domain: Eukaryota
- Kingdom: Animalia
- Phylum: Arthropoda
- Class: Insecta
- Order: Lepidoptera
- Family: Crambidae
- Subfamily: Spilomelinae
- Genus: Tanaophysopsis; Munroe, 1964
- Species: T. xanthyalinalis

Binomial name
- Tanaophysopsis xanthyalinalis (Hampson, 1918)

Synonyms
- Pyrausta xanthyalinalis Hampson, 1918

Genus of moths

Tanaophysopsis is a monotypic moth genus of the family Crambidae described by Eugene G. Munroe in 1964. Its only species, Tanaophysopsis xanthyalinalis, described by George Hampson in 1918, is found in Ecuador.
