= Oligostigmoides =

Scientific classification
- Domain: Eukaryota
- Kingdom: Animalia
- Phylum: Arthropoda
- Class: Insecta
- Order: Lepidoptera
- Family: Crambidae
- Subfamily: Acentropinae
- Genus: Oligostigmoides; Lange, 1956

Genus of moths

Oligostigmoides is a genus of moths of the family Crambidae described by William Harry Lange in 1956.

== Species ==
- Oligostigmoides cryptalis (Druce, 1896)
- Oligostigmoides cuernavacalis Lange, 1956
- Oligostigmoides mediocinctalis (Hampson, 1897)
- Oligostigmoides peruviensis (Hampson, 1917)
- Oligostigmoides profusalis (Schaus, 1912)
