= Hyperectis =

Scientific classification
- Kingdom: Animalia
- Phylum: Arthropoda
- Class: Insecta
- Order: Lepidoptera
- Family: Crambidae
- Subfamily: Pyraustinae
- Genus: Hyperectis; Meyrick, 1904

Genus of moths

Hyperectis is a genus of moths of the family Crambidae.

== Species ==
- Hyperectis apicalis Hampson, 1912
- Hyperectis dioctias Meyrick, 1904
