= Nymphulodes =

Scientific classification
- Kingdom: Animalia
- Phylum: Arthropoda
- Class: Insecta
- Order: Lepidoptera
- Family: Crambidae
- Subfamily: Acentropinae
- Genus: Nymphulodes; Hampson, 1919
- Species: N. franciscalis

Binomial name
- Nymphulodes franciscalis (Schaus, 1906)

Synonyms
- Nymphula franciscalis Schaus, 1906

Genus of moths

Nymphulodes is a genus of moths of the family Crambidae. It contains only one species, Nymphulodes franciscalis, which is found in Brazil.
