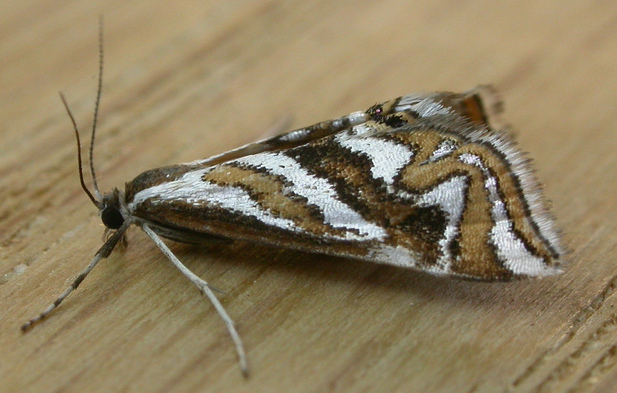

Scientific classification
- Kingdom: Animalia
- Phylum: Arthropoda
- Clade: Pancrustacea
- Class: Insecta
- Order: Lepidoptera
- Family: Crambidae
- Genus: Anydraula
- Species: A. glycerialis

Binomial name
- Anydraula glycerialis (Walker, 1859)

Synonyms
- Cataclysta glycerialis (Walker, 1859)

= Anydraula glycerialis =

Species of moth

Anydraula glycerialis is a species of moth of the family Crambidae described by Francis Walker in 1859. It is found in the Australian states of Queensland and New South Wales.
