= Banepa (moth) =

Scientific classification
- Domain: Eukaryota
- Kingdom: Animalia
- Phylum: Arthropoda
- Class: Insecta
- Order: Lepidoptera
- Family: Crambidae
- Subfamily: Acentropinae
- Genus: Banepa; Moore, 1888
- Species: B. atkinsonii

Binomial name
- Banepa atkinsonii Moore, 1888

Genus of moths

Banepa is a genus of moths of the family Crambidae. It contains only one species, Banepa atkinsonii, which is found in India (Darjeeling).
