= Oligocentris =

Scientific classification
- Domain: Eukaryota
- Kingdom: Animalia
- Phylum: Arthropoda
- Class: Insecta
- Order: Lepidoptera
- Family: Crambidae
- Subfamily: Pyraustinae
- Genus: Oligocentris; Hampson, 1896

Genus of moths

Oligocentris is a genus of moths of the family Crambidae.

== Species ==
- Oligocentris deciusalis (Walker, 1859)
- Oligocentris uniformalis Hampson, 1912
