= Hyaloplaga =

Scientific classification
- Domain: Eukaryota
- Kingdom: Animalia
- Phylum: Arthropoda
- Class: Insecta
- Order: Lepidoptera
- Family: Crambidae
- Subfamily: Acentropinae
- Genus: Hyaloplaga; Warren, 1892
- Species: H. pulchralis

Binomial name
- Hyaloplaga pulchralis (Moore, 1867)

Synonyms
- Hyaloplagia Sharp, 1893; Hydrocampa pulchralis Moore, 1867

Genus of moths

Hyaloplaga is a monotypic moth genus of the family Crambidae described by William Warren in 1892. It contains only one species, Hyaloplaga pulchralis, described by Frederic Moore in 1867, which is found in Darjeeling, India.
