= Neasarta =

Scientific classification
- Domain: Eukaryota
- Kingdom: Animalia
- Phylum: Arthropoda
- Class: Insecta
- Order: Lepidoptera
- Family: Crambidae
- Subfamily: Pyraustinae
- Genus: Neasarta; Hampson, 1908
- Species: N. nyctichroalis

Binomial name
- Neasarta nyctichroalis Hampson, 1908

Genus of moths

Neasarta is a genus of moths of the family Crambidae. It contains only one species, Neasarta nyctichroalis, which is found in Sri Lanka.
