= Nephelolychnis =

Scientific classification
- Domain: Eukaryota
- Kingdom: Animalia
- Phylum: Arthropoda
- Class: Insecta
- Order: Lepidoptera
- Family: Crambidae
- Subfamily: Pyraustinae
- Genus: Nephelolychnis; Meyrick, 1933

Genus of moths

Nephelolychnis is a genus of moths of the family Crambidae.

== Species ==
- Nephelolychnis ceadesalis (Walker, 1859)
- Nephelolychnis velata Meyrick, 1933
