= Tasenia =

Scientific classification
- Domain: Eukaryota
- Kingdom: Animalia
- Phylum: Arthropoda
- Class: Insecta
- Order: Lepidoptera
- Family: Crambidae
- Subfamily: Pyraustinae
- Genus: Tasenia; Snellen, 1901
- Species: T. nigromaculalis

Binomial name
- Tasenia nigromaculalis Snellen, 1901

Genus of moths

Tasenia is a genus of moths of the family Crambidae. It contains only one species, Tasenia nigromaculalis, which is found on Java.
