= Tamsica =

Scientific classification
- Domain: Eukaryota
- Kingdom: Animalia
- Phylum: Arthropoda
- Class: Insecta
- Order: Lepidoptera
- Family: Crambidae
- Subfamily: Crambinae
- Tribe: Diptychophorini
- Genus: Tamsica; Zimmerman, 1958

Genus of moths

Tamsica is a genus of moths of the family Crambidae.

== Species ==
- Tamsica floricolans (Butler, 1883)
- Tamsica geralea (Meyrick, 1899)
- Tamsica homodora (Meyrick, 1899)
- Tamsica hyacinthina (Meyrick, 1899)
- Tamsica hydrophila (Butler, 1882)
- Tamsica oxyptera (Meyrick, 1888)
