= Teratauxta =

Scientific classification
- Kingdom: Animalia
- Phylum: Arthropoda
- Class: Insecta
- Order: Lepidoptera
- Family: Crambidae
- Subfamily: Acentropinae
- Genus: Teratauxta; E. Hering, 1901
- Species: T. paradoxa

Binomial name
- Teratauxta paradoxa E. Hering, 1901

Synonyms
- Ridleyana Hampson, 1906; Ridleyana paradoxa

Genus of moths

Teratauxta is a genus of moths of the family Crambidae. It contains only one species, Teratauxta paradoxa, which is found on Sumatra.
