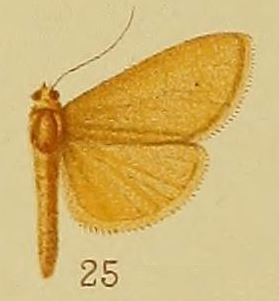

Scientific classification
- Domain: Eukaryota
- Kingdom: Animalia
- Phylum: Arthropoda
- Class: Insecta
- Order: Lepidoptera
- Family: Crambidae
- Subfamily: Spilomelinae
- Genus: Neostege; Hampson, 1910
- Species: N. holoxutha

Binomial name
- Neostege holoxutha Hampson, 1910

= Neostege =

Genus of moths

Neostege is a genus of moths of the family Crambidae described by George Hampson in 1910. It contains only one species, Neostege holoxutha, described in the same article, which is found in Zambia and Zimbabwe.
