= Brevicella =

Scientific classification
- Domain: Eukaryota
- Kingdom: Animalia
- Phylum: Arthropoda
- Class: Insecta
- Order: Lepidoptera
- Family: Crambidae
- Subfamily: Acentropinae
- Genus: Brevicella; Kenrick, 1912
- Species: B. emarginata

Binomial name
- Brevicella emarginata Kenrick, 1912

Genus of moths

Brevicella is a genus of moths of the family Crambidae. It contains only one species, Brevicella emarginata, which is found in New Guinea.
