= Hemiptocha =

Scientific classification
- Domain: Eukaryota
- Kingdom: Animalia
- Phylum: Arthropoda
- Class: Insecta
- Order: Lepidoptera
- Family: Crambidae
- Subfamily: Crambinae
- Tribe: incertae sedis
- Genus: Hemiptocha; Dognin, 1905

Genus of moths

Hemiptocha is a genus of moths of the family Crambidae.

== Species ==
- Hemiptocha agraphella Dognin, 1905
- Hemiptocha argentosa (Snellen, 1893)
- Hemiptocha atratellus (Hampson, 1919)
- Hemiptocha chalcostomus (Dyar, 1916)
