= Hutuna (moth) =

Scientific classification
- Kingdom: Animalia
- Phylum: Arthropoda
- Class: Insecta
- Order: Lepidoptera
- Family: Crambidae
- Subfamily: Pyraustinae
- Genus: Hutuna; Whalley, 1962

Genus of moths

Hutuna is a genus of moths of the family Crambidae.

== Species ==
- Hutuna aurantialis (Hampson, 1917)
- Hutuna nigromarginalis Whalley, 1962
