= Hemiloba =

Scientific classification
- Domain: Eukaryota
- Kingdom: Animalia
- Phylum: Arthropoda
- Class: Insecta
- Order: Lepidoptera
- Family: Crambidae
- Subfamily: Acentropinae
- Genus: Hemiloba; C. Swinhoe, 1901
- Species: H. excisa

Binomial name
- Hemiloba excisa C. Swinhoe, 1901

Genus of moths

Hemiloba is a monotypic moth genus of the family Crambidae described by Charles Swinhoe in 1901. It contains only one species, Hemiloba excisa, described in the same article. It is found in India.
