= Gynenomis =

Scientific classification
- Domain: Eukaryota
- Kingdom: Animalia
- Phylum: Arthropoda
- Class: Insecta
- Order: Lepidoptera
- Family: Crambidae
- Subfamily: Pyraustinae
- Genus: Gynenomis; Munroe & Mutuura, 1968

Genus of moths

Gynenomis is a genus of moths of the family Crambidae.

== Species ==
- Gynenomis mindanaoensis Munroe & Mutuura, 1968
- Gynenomis sericealis (Wileman & South, 1917)
