= Opisthedeicta =

Scientific classification
- Kingdom: Animalia
- Phylum: Arthropoda
- Class: Insecta
- Order: Lepidoptera
- Family: Crambidae
- Subfamily: Acentropinae
- Genus: Opisthedeicta; Warren, 1890
- Species: O. poritialis

Binomial name
- Opisthedeicta poritialis (Walker, 1859)

Synonyms
- Oligostigma poritialis Walker, 1859; Ambia poritialis

Genus of moths

Opisthedeicta is a genus of moths of the family Crambidae. It contains only one species, Opisthedeicta poritialis, which is found in south-eastern India, Sri Lanka and on Sumatra.
