= Nothomastix =

Scientific classification
- Kingdom: Animalia
- Phylum: Arthropoda
- Class: Insecta
- Order: Lepidoptera
- Family: Crambidae
- Genus: Nothomastix; Warren, 1890

Genus of moths

Nothomastix is a genus of moths of the family Crambidae described by Warren in 1890.

== Species ==
- Nothomastix chromalis (Walker, 1866)
- Nothomastix klossi (Rothschild, 1915)
- Nothomastix obliquifascialis Hampson, 1896
- Nothomastix pronaxalis (Walker, 1859)
- Nothomastix pyranthes (Meyrick, 1894)
