= Gadessa =

Scientific classification
- Domain: Eukaryota
- Kingdom: Animalia
- Phylum: Arthropoda
- Class: Insecta
- Order: Lepidoptera
- Family: Crambidae
- Subfamily: Spilomelinae
- Genus: Gadessa; Moore, 1885

Genus of moths

Gadessa is a genus of moths of the family Crambidae.

== Species ==
- Gadessa albifrons Moore, 1886
- Gadessa nilusalis (Walker, 1859)
- Gadessa ossea Butler, 1889
