= Temnobasis =

Scientific classification
- Domain: Eukaryota
- Kingdom: Animalia
- Phylum: Arthropoda
- Class: Insecta
- Order: Lepidoptera
- Family: Crambidae
- Subfamily: Acentropinae
- Genus: Temnobasis; Gaede, 1916
- Species: T. simialis

Binomial name
- Temnobasis simialis Gaede, 1916

Genus of moths

Temnobasis is a monotypic moth genus of the family Crambidae described by Max Gaede in 1916. It contains only one species, Temnobasis simialis, described in the same article, which is found in Cameroon.
