= Niphostola =

Scientific classification
- Kingdom: Animalia
- Phylum: Arthropoda
- Class: Insecta
- Order: Lepidoptera
- Family: Crambidae
- Subfamily: Pyraustinae
- Genus: Niphostola; Hampson, 1896

Genus of moths

Niphostola is a genus of moths of the family Crambidae.

== Species ==
- Niphostola micans Hampson, 1896
- Niphostola punctata Swinhoe, 1904
