= Nyctiplanes =

Scientific classification
- Kingdom: Animalia
- Phylum: Arthropoda
- Clade: Pancrustacea
- Class: Insecta
- Order: Lepidoptera
- Family: Crambidae
- Subfamily: Acentropinae
- Genus: Nyctiplanes; Turner, 1937
- Species: N. polypenthes

Binomial name
- Nyctiplanes polypenthes Turner, 1937

Genus of moths

Nyctiplanes is a genus of moths of the family Crambidae. It contains only one species, Nyctiplanes polypenthes, which is found in Australia, where it has been recorded from Queensland.
