= Araeomorpha =

Scientific classification
- Domain: Eukaryota
- Kingdom: Animalia
- Phylum: Arthropoda
- Class: Insecta
- Order: Lepidoptera
- Family: Crambidae
- Subfamily: Acentropinae
- Genus: Araeomorpha; Turner, 1908

Synonyms
- Tholerastis Turner, 1915

Genus of moths

Araeomorpha is a genus of moths of the family Crambidae.

== Species ==
- Araeomorpha diplopa (Lower, 1903)
- Araeomorpha limnophila Turner, 1937
