= Neurophruda =

Scientific classification
- Kingdom: Animalia
- Phylum: Arthropoda
- Class: Insecta
- Order: Lepidoptera
- Family: Crambidae
- Subfamily: Acentropinae
- Genus: Neurophruda; Warren, 1896
- Species: N. daulialis

Binomial name
- Neurophruda daulialis Warren, 1896

Synonyms
- Neophruda Hampson, 1897

Genus of moths

Neurophruda is a genus of moths of the family Crambidae. It contains only one species, Neurophruda daulialis, which is found in India (Meghalaya).
