= Giorgia (moth) =

Scientific classification
- Kingdom: Animalia
- Phylum: Arthropoda
- Class: Insecta
- Order: Lepidoptera
- Family: Crambidae
- Subfamily: Acentropinae
- Genus: Giorgia; J. F. G. Clarke, 1965
- Species: G. crena

Binomial name
- Giorgia crena Clarke, 1965

Genus of moths

Giorgia is a monotypic moth genus of the family Crambidae described by John Frederick Gates Clarke in 1965. It contains only one species, Giorgia crena, described by the same author in the same year from the Juan Fernandez Archipelago in Chile.
