= Neoculladia =

Scientific classification
- Domain: Eukaryota
- Kingdom: Animalia
- Phylum: Arthropoda
- Class: Insecta
- Order: Lepidoptera
- Family: Crambidae
- Tribe: Crambini
- Genus: Neoculladia; Bleszynski, 1967

Genus of moths

Neoculladia is a genus of moths of the family Crambidae.

== Species ==
- Neoculladia incanelloides Bleszynski, 1967
- Neoculladia incanellus (Zeller, 1877)
- Neoculladia subincanella Bleszynski, 1967
