= Goniopalpia =

Scientific classification
- Domain: Eukaryota
- Kingdom: Animalia
- Phylum: Arthropoda
- Class: Insecta
- Order: Lepidoptera
- Family: Crambidae
- Subfamily: Acentropinae
- Genus: Goniopalpia; Hampson, 1903
- Species: G. delicatalis

Binomial name
- Goniopalpia delicatalis Hampson, 1903

Genus of moths

Goniopalpia is a monotypic moth genus of the family Crambidae described by George Hampson in 1903. It contains only one species, Goniopalpia delicatalis, described in the same article, which is found in India.
