= Heterudea =

Scientific classification
- Domain: Eukaryota
- Kingdom: Animalia
- Phylum: Arthropoda
- Class: Insecta
- Order: Lepidoptera
- Family: Crambidae
- Subfamily: Spilomelinae
- Genus: Heterudea; Dognin, 1905

Genus of moths

Heterudea is a genus of moths of the family Crambidae.

== Species ==
- Heterudea grisealis Dognin, 1905
- Heterudea illustralis Dognin, 1905
