= Glaucoda =

Scientific classification
- Domain: Eukaryota
- Kingdom: Animalia
- Phylum: Arthropoda
- Class: Insecta
- Order: Lepidoptera
- Family: Crambidae
- Subfamily: Pyraustinae
- Genus: Glaucoda; Karsch, 1900
- Species: G. transparitalis

Binomial name
- Glaucoda transparitalis Karsch, 1900

Genus of moths

Glaucoda is a genus of moths of the family Crambidae. It contains only one species, Glaucoda transparitalis, which is found in Cameroon, the Democratic Republic of Congo, Equatorial Guinea, Sierra Leone and Togo.
