= Osphrantis =

Scientific classification
- Domain: Eukaryota
- Kingdom: Animalia
- Phylum: Arthropoda
- Class: Insecta
- Order: Lepidoptera
- Family: Crambidae
- Subfamily: Acentropinae
- Genus: Osphrantis; Meyrick, 1897
- Species: O. paraphaea

Binomial name
- Osphrantis paraphaea Meyrick, 1897

Genus of moths

Osphrantis is a genus of moths of the family Crambidae. It contains only one species, Osphrantis paraphaea, which is found on the Talaud Islands, Indonesia.
