= Hylebatis =

Scientific classification
- Domain: Eukaryota
- Kingdom: Animalia
- Phylum: Arthropoda
- Class: Insecta
- Order: Lepidoptera
- Family: Crambidae
- Subfamily: Acentropinae
- Genus: Hylebatis; Turner, 1908
- Species: H. scintillifera

Binomial name
- Hylebatis scintillifera Turner, 1908

Genus of moths

Hylebatis is a monotypic moth genus of the family Crambidae described by Alfred Jefferis Turner in 1908. It contains only one species, Hylebatis scintillifera, described by the same author in the same year, which is found in Australia, where it has been recorded from Victoria and New South Wales.

The wings are brown with white and yellow markings. There are black spots on the hindwing margins.
