= Nannobotys =

Scientific classification
- Kingdom: Animalia
- Phylum: Arthropoda
- Class: Insecta
- Order: Lepidoptera
- Family: Crambidae
- Genus: Nannobotys; Munroe, 1961
- Species: N. commortalis

Binomial name
- Nannobotys commortalis (Grote, 1881)

Synonyms
- Botis commortalis Grote, 1881; Noctuelia minima Dyar, 1917

Genus of moths

Nannobotys is a genus of moths of the family Crambidae. It contains only one species, Nannobotys commortalis, which is found in North America, where it has been recorded from eastern Washington to California and Nevada.

The wingspan is about 11–12 mm. The forewings are brown, crossed by two distinct lines. The hindwings are pure white. Adults are diurnal and on wing from March to April and in June.
