= Torqueola =

Scientific classification
- Domain: Eukaryota
- Kingdom: Animalia
- Phylum: Arthropoda
- Class: Insecta
- Order: Lepidoptera
- Family: Crambidae
- Subfamily: Spilomelinae
- Genus: Torqueola; C. Swinhoe, 1906

Genus of moths

Torqueola is a genus of moths of the family Crambidae described by Charles Swinhoe in 1906.

== Species ==
- Torqueola hypolampra Turner, 1915
- Torqueola monophaes (Lower, 1902)
- Torqueola ophiceralis (Walker, 1866)
