= Gethosyne =

Scientific classification
- Domain: Eukaryota
- Kingdom: Animalia
- Phylum: Arthropoda
- Class: Insecta
- Order: Lepidoptera
- Family: Crambidae
- Subfamily: Spilomelinae
- Genus: Gethosyne; Warren, 1896
- Species: G. aequivocalis

Binomial name
- Gethosyne aequivocalis Warren, 1896

Genus of moths

Gethosyne is a genus of moths of the family Crambidae. It contains only one species, Gethosyne aequivocalis, which is found in Meghalaya, in Northeast India. Its type locality is the Khasi Hills.
