= Burmannia marmorellus =

Scientific classification
- Domain: Eukaryota
- Kingdom: Animalia
- Phylum: Arthropoda
- Class: Insecta
- Order: Lepidoptera
- Family: Crambidae
- Subfamily: Crambinae
- Tribe: incertae sedis
- Genus: Burmannia; Bleszynski, 1965
- Species: B. marmorellus

Binomial name
- Burmannia marmorellus (South in Leech & South, 1901)

Synonyms
- Prionopteryx marmorellus South in Leech & South, 1901

Genus of moths

Burmannia is a genus of moths of the family Crambidae. It contains only one species, Burmannia marmorellus, which is found in China (Sichuan).
