= Tulaya =

Scientific classification
- Domain: Eukaryota
- Kingdom: Animalia
- Phylum: Arthropoda
- Class: Insecta
- Order: Lepidoptera
- Family: Crambidae
- Subfamily: Odontiinae
- Genus: Tulaya; Özdikmen, 2007

Synonyms
- Hercynella Bethune-Baker, 1893 (preocc. Kayser, 1878)

Genus of moths

Tulaya is a genus of moths of the family Crambidae. It was previously named Hercynella but that name was pre-occupied by a genus of fossil molluscs.

== Species ==
- Tulaya margelana (Bethune-Baker, 1893)
- Tulaya staudingeri (Bethune-Baker, 1893)
