= Neocataclysta =

Scientific classification
- Kingdom: Animalia
- Phylum: Arthropoda
- Class: Insecta
- Order: Lepidoptera
- Family: Crambidae
- Genus: Neocataclysta; Lange, 1956
- Species: N. magnificalis

Binomial name
- Neocataclysta magnificalis (Hübner, 1796)

Synonyms
- Pyralis magnificalis Hübner, 1796; Cataclysta helopalis Clemens, 1860; Cataclysta lamialis Walker, 1859; Cataclysta heliopalis

Genus of moths

Neocataclysta is a genus of moths of the family Crambidae. It contains only one species, Neocataclysta magnificalis, the scrollwork pyralid moth, which is found in North America, where it has been recorded from Florida, Georgia, Maine, Massachusetts, Mississippi, New Jersey, New York, North Carolina, Nova Scotia, Ohio, Ontario and South Carolina.

Adults have been recorded on wing year round.
