= Nymphuliella =

Scientific classification
- Kingdom: Animalia
- Phylum: Arthropoda
- Class: Insecta
- Order: Lepidoptera
- Family: Crambidae
- Subfamily: Acentropinae
- Genus: Nymphuliella; Lange, 1956
- Species: N. daeckealis

Binomial name
- Nymphuliella daeckealis (Haimbach, 1915)

Synonyms
- Diathrausta daeckealis Haimbach, 1915; Nymphula broweri Heinrich, 1940

Genus of moths

Nymphuliella is a monotypic moth genus of the family Crambidae described by William Harry Lange in 1956. It contains only one species, Nymphuliella daeckealis, known in the US as the china mark moth, described by F. Haimbach in 1915. It is found in the United States from New Jersey south to Florida and west to Colorado.
