= Nicaria (moth) =

Scientific classification
- Kingdom: Animalia
- Phylum: Arthropoda
- Class: Insecta
- Order: Lepidoptera
- Family: Crambidae
- Subfamily: Acentropinae
- Genus: Nicaria; Snellen, 1880
- Species: N. latisquamalis

Binomial name
- Nicaria latisquamalis Snellen, (1879) 1880

Genus of moths

Nicaria is a genus of moths of the family Crambidae. It contains only one species, Nicaria latisquamalis, which is found in Sulawesi.
