= List of crambid genera: J =

The large moth family Crambidae contains the following genera beginning with "J":

- Japonichilo
- Japonicrambus
- Jartheza
- Jativa
- Juania
