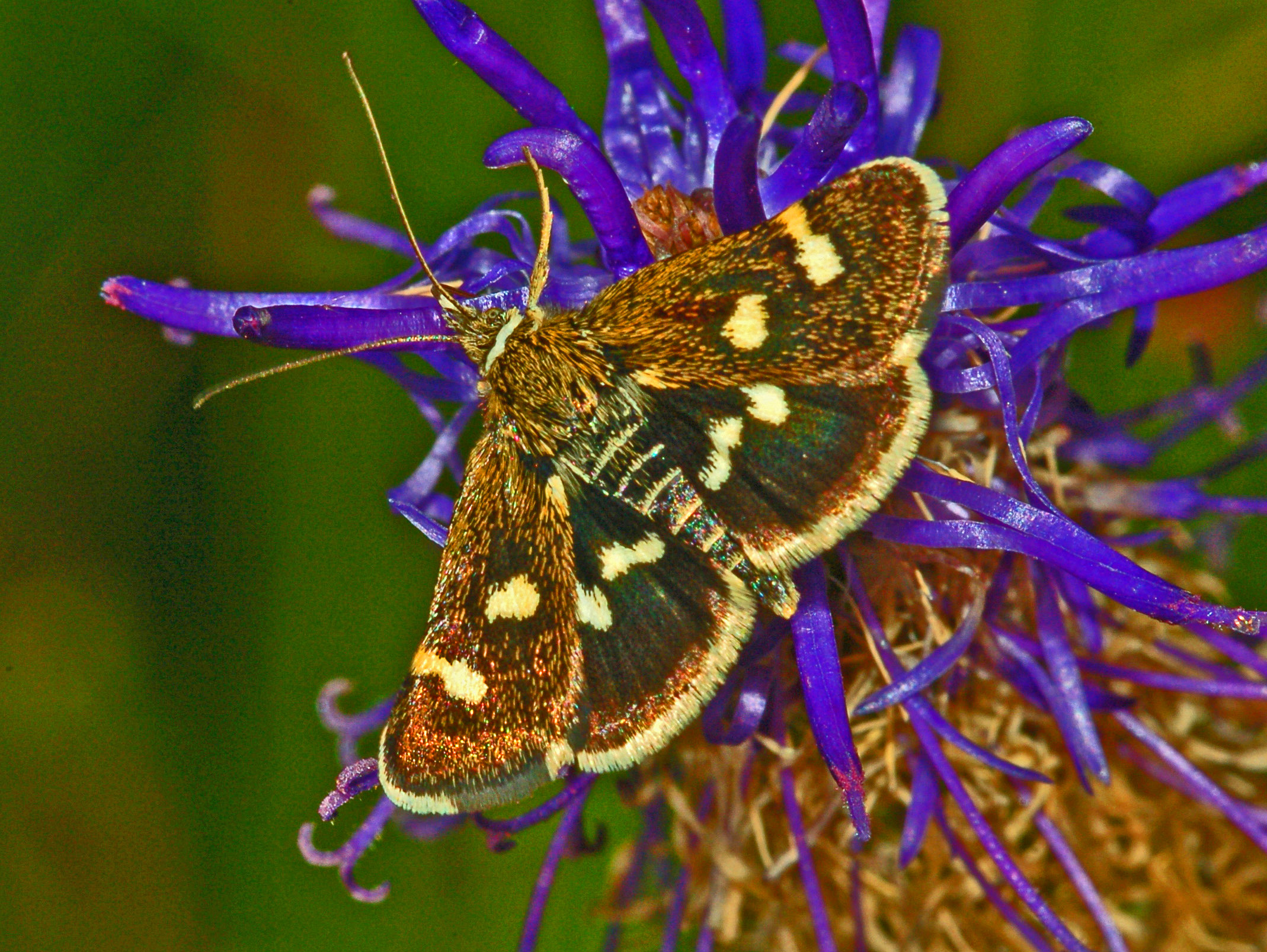
- Eurrhypis pollinalis

Scientific classification
- Domain: Eukaryota
- Kingdom: Animalia
- Phylum: Arthropoda
- Class: Insecta
- Order: Lepidoptera
- Family: Crambidae
- Subfamily: Odontiinae; Guenée, 1854

Synonyms
- Hercyninae A. Blanchard, 1840

= Odontiinae =

Subfamily of moths

Odontiinae is a subfamily of moths of the family Crambidae. The subfamily was described by Achille Guenée in 1854.

== Tribes ==
- Hercynini
  - Aeglotis Amsel, 1949
  - Autocharis Swinhoe, 1894
  - Balaenifrons Hampson, 1896
  - Blepharucha Warren, 1892
  - Boeotarcha Meyrick, 1884 (= Botys crassicornis Walker, [1866])
  - Canalibotys Maes, 2004
  - Canuza Walker, 1866 (= Erotomanes Meyrick, 1882)
  - Clupeosoma Snellen, 1880
  - Cuneifrons Munroe, 1961
  - Dausara Walker, 1859
  - Deanolis Snellen, 1899
  - Dilacinia Amsel, 1961 (= Dilacina Amsel, 1961)
  - Ertrica Walker, 1866
  - Euctenospila Warren, 1892
  - Glaucodontia Munroe, 1972
  - Gononoorda Munroe, 1977
  - Hemiscopis Warren, 1890
  - Heortia Lederer, 1863 (= Eteta Walker, 1865, Tyspana Moore, 1885)
  - Hydrorybina Hampson, 1896
  - Irigilla Swinhoe, 1900
  - Kerbela Amsel, 1949
  - Mabilleodes Marion & Viette, 1956
  - Metaxmeste Hübner, 1825 (= Hercyna Treitschke, 1828, Heryna Wocke, 1871, Metaxmestes Hübner, 1826)
  - Neocymbopteryx Munroe, 1973
  - Neogenesis Hampson, 1907
  - Noctuelita Strand, 1915
  - Noordodes Hampson, 1916
  - Phlyctaenomorpha Amsel, 1970
  - Pitama Moore, 1888
  - Platynoorda Munroe, 1977
  - Porphyronoorda Munroe, 1977
  - Probalaenifrons Munroe, 1977
  - Protrigonia Hampson, 1896
  - Suinoorda Hayden, 2009
  - Syntonarcha Meyrick, 1890
  - Taurometopa Meyrick, 1933
  - Thesaurica Turner, 1915
  - Tulaya Özdikmen, 2007 (= Hercynella Bethune-Baker, 1893)
  - Turania Ragonot, 1891
  - Usgentia Amsel, 1949
- Eurrhypini
  - Argyrarcha Munroe, 1974
  - Cliniodes Guenée, 1854 (= Basonga Möschler, 1886, Exarcha Lederer, 1863, Idessa Walker, 1859, Metrea Grote, 1882)
  - Dicepolia Snellen in Snellen, 1892 (= Endolophia Hampson, 1899)
  - Eurrhypis Hübner, 1825 (= Threnodes Duponchel, 1845)
  - Hyalinarcha Munroe, 1974
  - Jativa Munroe, 1961
  - Mecynarcha Munroe, 1974
  - Mimoschinia Warren, 1892
  - Porphyrorhegma Munroe, 1961
  - Pseudonoorda Munroe, 1974
  - Pseudoschinia Munroe, 1961
  - Sobanga Munroe, 1964
  - Trigonoorda Munroe, 1974
  - Viettessa Minet, 1980
- Odontiini
  - Aeschremon Lederer, 1863
  - Anatralata Munroe, 1961
  - Aporodes Guenée, 1854
  - Atralata Sylvén, 1947 (= Ennychia Lederer, 1863)
  - Cataonia Ragonot, 1891
  - Chlorobaptella Munroe, 1995 (= Chlorobapta Barnes & McDunnough, 1914)
  - Chrismania Barnes & McDunnough, 1914
  - Cymbopteryx Munroe, 1961
  - Cynaeda Hübner, 1825 (= Cynoeda Walker, 1859, Noctuelia Guenée, 1854, Noctuaelia Wocke, 1871, Odontia Duponchel, 1832)
  - Dentifovea Amsel, 1970
  - Dichozoma Munroe, 1961
  - Edia Dyar, 1913
  - Epascestria Hübner, 1825 (= Epacestria Marion, 1957, Phlyctaenodes Guenée, 1854, Phlyctoenodes Cerf, 1910)
  - Ephelis Lederer, 1863 (= Emprepes Lederer, 1863, Hammocallos Chrétien, 1908)
  - Epimetasia Ragonot, 1894 (= Metasiodes Ragonot, 1894, Thyridopsis Amsel, 1953)
  - Eremanthe Munroe, 1972
  - Frechinia Munroe, 1961
  - Gyros H. Edwards, 1881 (= Monocona Warren, 1892, Oribates H. Edwards, 1881)
  - Heliothelopsis Munroe, 1961
  - Microtheoris Meyrick, 1932
  - Mojavia Munroe, 1961
  - Mojaviodes Munroe, 1972
  - Nannobotys Munroe, 1961
  - Noctueliopsis Munroe, 1961
  - Odontivalvia Munroe, 1973
  - Plumipalpiella Munroe, 1995 (= Plumipalpia Munroe, 1961)
  - Pogonogenys Munroe, 1961
  - Procymbopteryx Munroe, 1961
  - Psammobotys Munroe, 1961
  - Rhodocantha Munroe, 1961
  - Tegostoma Zeller, 1847 (= Anthophilodes Guenée, 1854, Anthophilopsis Ragonot, 1891)
  - Titanio Hübner, 1825 (= Noctuomorpha Guenée, 1854, Titania J. L. R. Agassiz, 1846)

== Former genera ==
- Denticornutia M. O. Martin, 1986
- Pelaea Lederer, 1863
