= Porphyronoorda =

Scientific classification
- Domain: Eukaryota
- Kingdom: Animalia
- Phylum: Arthropoda
- Class: Insecta
- Order: Lepidoptera
- Family: Crambidae
- Subfamily: Odontiinae
- Genus: Porphyronoorda; Munroe, 1977
- Species: P. decumbens

Binomial name
- Porphyronoorda decumbens Munroe, 1977

Genus of moths

Porphyronoorda is a genus of moths of the family Crambidae. It contains only one species, Porphyronoorda decumbens, which is found in India.
