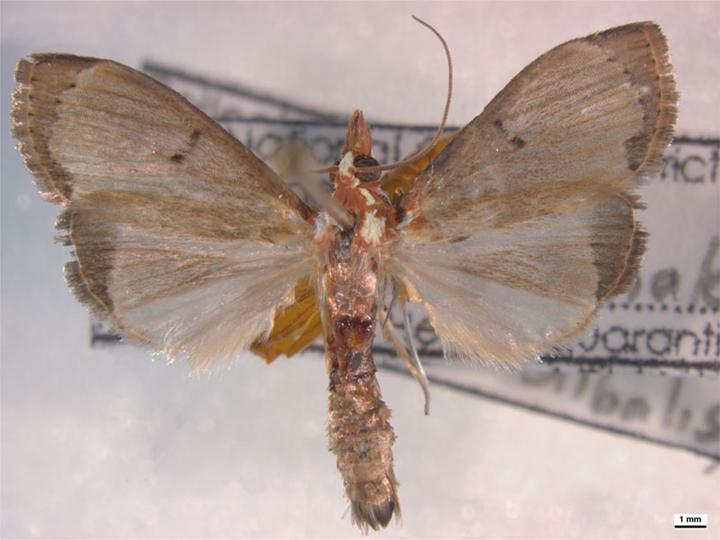

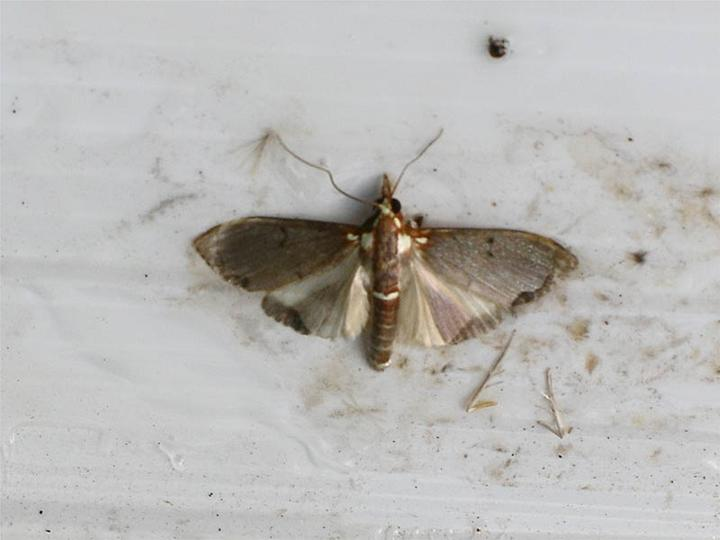

Scientific classification
- Kingdom: Animalia
- Phylum: Arthropoda
- Class: Insecta
- Order: Lepidoptera
- Family: Crambidae
- Genus: Deanolis
- Species: D. sublimbalis

Binomial name
- Deanolis sublimbalis Snellen, 1899

Synonyms
- Noorda albizonalis Hampson, 1903

= Deanolis sublimbalis =

Species of moth

Deanolis sublimbalis, the red banded mango caterpillar, is a moth of the family Crambidae. The species was first described by Pieter Cornelius Tobias Snellen in 1899. It is found in India (Sikkim, Darjeeling) and Indonesia (Sulawesi), Papua New Guinea, Myanmar, Thailand, China, Brunei and the Philippines. In 1990 it was first recorded in Australia in the Torres Strait and in 2001 it was detected on the Australian mainland in the Northern Peninsula Area at the tip of the Cape York Peninsula in Queensland.

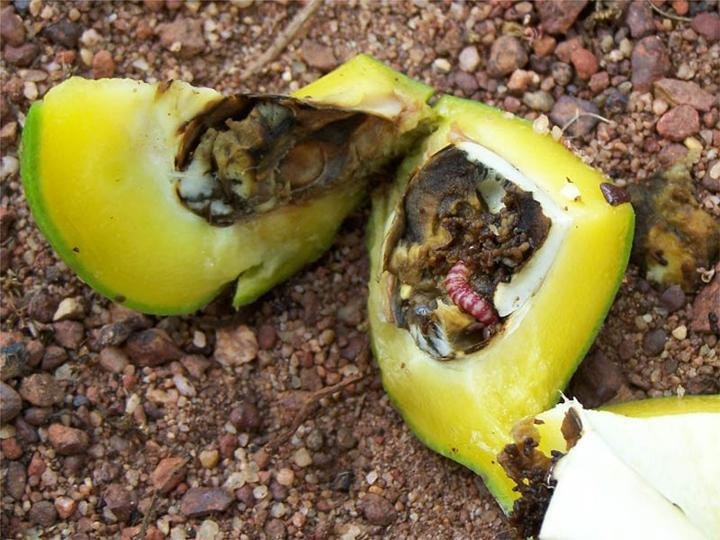
Larva in a mango fruit

The wingspan is about 20 mm.

The larvae are a serious pest of Mangifera indica fruit, but have also been recorded feeding on Mangifera minor and Mangifera odorata.
