= Cuneifrons =

Scientific classification
- Kingdom: Animalia
- Phylum: Arthropoda
- Clade: Pancrustacea
- Class: Insecta
- Order: Lepidoptera
- Family: Crambidae
- Subfamily: Odontiinae
- Genus: Cuneifrons; Munroe, 1961
- Species: C. coloradensis

Binomial name
- Cuneifrons coloradensis Munroe, 1961

Genus of moths

Cuneifrons is a monotypic moth genus of the family Crambidae described by Eugene G. Munroe in 1961. Its only species, Cuneifrons coloradensis, described by the same author in the same year, is found in the US state of Colorado.
