= Thesaurica notodontalis =

Scientific classification
- Kingdom: Animalia
- Phylum: Arthropoda
- Class: Insecta
- Order: Lepidoptera
- Family: Crambidae
- Genus: Thesaurica
- Species: T. notodontalis

Binomial name
- Thesaurica notodontalis (Hampson, 1899)

Synonyms
- Sameodes notodontalis Hampson, 1899

Species of moth

Thesaurica notodontalis is a moth in the family Crambidae. It was described by George Hampson in 1899. It is found on Borneo.

The wingspan is about 20 mm. The forewings are suffused with fiery orange, leaving a subbasal, antemedial and medial series of ill-defined yellow spots. There is a medial pinkish band and the terminal area is also pinkish. The hindwings are semihyaline yellow, tinged with fuscous towards the termen.
