= Noordodes =

Scientific classification
- Domain: Eukaryota
- Kingdom: Animalia
- Phylum: Arthropoda
- Class: Insecta
- Order: Lepidoptera
- Family: Crambidae
- Subfamily: Odontiinae
- Genus: Noordodes; Hampson, 1916

Genus of moths

Noordodes is a genus of moths of the family Crambidae.

== Species ==
- Noordodes magnificalis (Rothschild, 1916)
- Noordodes purpureoflava Hampson, 1916
