= Trigonoorda =

Scientific classification
- Domain: Eukaryota
- Kingdom: Animalia
- Phylum: Arthropoda
- Class: Insecta
- Order: Lepidoptera
- Family: Crambidae
- Tribe: Eurrhypini
- Genus: Trigonoorda; Munroe, 1974

Genus of moths

Trigonoorda is a genus of moths of the family Crambidae.

== Species ==
- Trigonoorda gavisalis (Walker, 1869)
- Trigonoorda iebelealis Munroe, 1974
- Trigonoorda psarochroa (Turner, 1908)
- Trigonoorda rhodea (Lower, 1905)
- Trigonoorda rhodopa (Turner, 1908)
- Trigonoorda triangularis Munroe, 1974
- Trigonoorda trygoda (Meyrick, 1897)
