= Porphyrorhegma =

Scientific classification
- Domain: Eukaryota
- Kingdom: Animalia
- Phylum: Arthropoda
- Class: Insecta
- Order: Lepidoptera
- Family: Crambidae
- Tribe: Eurrhypini
- Genus: Porphyrorhegma; Munroe, 1961
- Species: P. fortunata

Binomial name
- Porphyrorhegma fortunata Munroe, 1961

Genus of moths

Porphyrorhegma is a genus of moths of the family Crambidae. It contains only one species, Porphyrorhegma fortunata, which is found in North America, where it has been recorded from California.
