= Kerbela (moth) =

Scientific classification
- Domain: Eukaryota
- Kingdom: Animalia
- Phylum: Arthropoda
- Class: Insecta
- Order: Lepidoptera
- Family: Crambidae
- Subfamily: Odontiinae
- Genus: Kerbela; Amsel, 1949

Genus of moths

Kerbela is a genus of moths of the family Crambidae.

== Species ==
- Kerbela monotona Amsel, 1949
- Kerbela turcomanica (Christoph, 1877)
