= Usgentia vespertalis =

Scientific classification
- Domain: Eukaryota
- Kingdom: Animalia
- Phylum: Arthropoda
- Class: Insecta
- Order: Lepidoptera
- Family: Crambidae
- Genus: Usgentia
- Species: U. vespertalis

Binomial name
- Usgentia vespertalis (Herrich-Schaffer, 1851)

Synonyms
- Hercyna vespertalis Herrich-Schaffer, 1851; Noctuelia vespertalis; Usgentia gilvalis Zerny, 1914; Usgentia sordidalis Zerny, 1914

Species of moth

Usgentia vespertalis is a species of moth in the family Crambidae. It is found in Greece and on Sicily, as well as in Turkey.
