= Procymbopteryx =

Scientific classification
- Domain: Eukaryota
- Kingdom: Animalia
- Phylum: Arthropoda
- Class: Insecta
- Order: Lepidoptera
- Family: Crambidae
- Subfamily: Odontiinae
- Genus: Procymbopteryx; Munroe, 1961
- Species: P. belialis

Binomial name
- Procymbopteryx belialis (H. Druce, 1899)

Synonyms
- Pionea belialis H. Druce, 1899

Genus of moths

Procymbopteryx is a monotypic moth genus of the family Crambidae erected by Eugene G. Munroe in 1961. Its only species, Procymbopteryx belialis, was first described by Herbert Druce in 1899. It is found in the Mexican state of Guerrero and the US state of Arizona.

The wingspan is about 17 mm. The forewings are dark grayish brown. The costa, outer and inner margin are edged with yellowish white. The hindwings are grayish white, but darker along the outer margin. Adults are on wing from July to August.
