= Noctuelita =

Scientific classification
- Kingdom: Animalia
- Phylum: Arthropoda
- Clade: Pancrustacea
- Class: Insecta
- Order: Lepidoptera
- Family: Crambidae
- Subfamily: Odontiinae
- Genus: Noctuelita; Strand, 1915
- Species: N. bicolorata

Binomial name
- Noctuelita bicolorata Strand, 1915

Genus of moths

Noctuelita is a genus of moths of the family Crambidae. It contains only one species, Noctuelita bicolorata, which is found in the Cameroon.
