= Canuza euspilella =

Scientific classification
- Kingdom: Animalia
- Phylum: Arthropoda
- Class: Insecta
- Order: Lepidoptera
- Family: Crambidae
- Genus: Canuza
- Species: C. euspilella

Binomial name
- Canuza euspilella Walker, 1866

Synonyms
- Anerastia mirabilella Meyrick, 1879

Species of moth

Canuza euspilella is a moth in the family Crambidae. It was described by Francis Walker in 1866. It is found in Australia, where it has been recorded from New South Wales.
