= Gyros powelli =

Scientific classification
- Domain: Eukaryota
- Kingdom: Animalia
- Phylum: Arthropoda
- Class: Insecta
- Order: Lepidoptera
- Family: Crambidae
- Genus: Gyros
- Species: G. powelli

Binomial name
- Gyros powelli Munroe, 1959

Species of moth

Gyros powelli is a moth in the family Crambidae. It was described by Eugene G. Munroe in 1959. It is found in North America, where it has been recorded from California.
