= Pogonogenys proximalis =

Scientific classification
- Kingdom: Animalia
- Phylum: Arthropoda
- Clade: Pancrustacea
- Class: Insecta
- Order: Lepidoptera
- Family: Crambidae
- Genus: Pogonogenys
- Species: P. proximalis

Binomial name
- Pogonogenys proximalis (Fernald, 1894)

Synonyms
- Titanio proximalis Fernald, 1894

Species of moth

Pogonogenys proximalis is a moth in the family Crambidae. It was described by Charles H. Fernald in 1894. It is found in North America, where it has been recorded from California and Nevada.
