= Dausara orionalis =

Scientific classification
- Kingdom: Animalia
- Phylum: Arthropoda
- Class: Insecta
- Order: Lepidoptera
- Family: Crambidae
- Genus: Dausara
- Species: D. orionalis

Binomial name
- Dausara orionalis (Walker, 1859)

Synonyms
- Glyphodes orionalis Walker, 1859

Species of moth

Dausara orionalis is a moth in the family Crambidae. It was described by Francis Walker in 1859. It is found on Borneo.

The wings are brown with purple and cupreous reflections. The forewings are yellowish white at the base, except along the costa. There is a white semihyaline (almost glasslike) purple-tinged band which is bordered with blackish on the outer margin. There is also a brown subcostal spot which is connected with the brown costa. The hindwings are white, but semihyaline at the base.
