= Phlyctaenomorpha sinuosalis =

Scientific classification
- Domain: Eukaryota
- Kingdom: Animalia
- Phylum: Arthropoda
- Class: Insecta
- Order: Lepidoptera
- Family: Crambidae
- Genus: Phlyctaenomorpha
- Species: P. sinuosalis

Binomial name
- Phlyctaenomorpha sinuosalis (Cerf, [1910])

Synonyms
- Phlyctoenodes sinuosalis Cerf, [1910]; Loxostege platyphaea Meyrick, 1937

Species of moth

Phlyctaenomorpha sinuosalis is a moth in the family Crambidae. It was described by Ferdinand Le Cerf in 1910. It is found in Iraq and Turkey.
