= Edia minutissima =

Scientific classification
- Domain: Eukaryota
- Kingdom: Animalia
- Phylum: Arthropoda
- Class: Insecta
- Order: Lepidoptera
- Family: Crambidae
- Genus: Edia
- Species: E. minutissima

Binomial name
- Edia minutissima (Smith, 1906)

Synonyms
- Lythrodes minutissima Smith, 1906; Edia coolidgei Dyar, 1921

Species of moth

Edia minutissima is a moth in the family Crambidae. It was described by Smith in 1906. It is found in North America, where it has been recorded from Arizona and California.

The length of the forewings is 5–6 mm. Adults have been recorded on wing in February and from April to May.
