= Blepharucha =

Scientific classification
- Domain: Eukaryota
- Kingdom: Animalia
- Phylum: Arthropoda
- Class: Insecta
- Order: Lepidoptera
- Family: Crambidae
- Subfamily: Odontiinae
- Genus: Blepharucha; Warren, 1892
- Species: B. zaide

Binomial name
- Blepharucha zaide (Stoll, 1790)

Synonyms
- Phalaena zaide Stoll, 1790; Scopula dilaceratalis Walker, 1866; Botys cruoralis Zeller, 1852; Blepharucha zaida Walker, 1862; Blepharucha zaidaria Guenée, 1857

Genus of moths

Blepharucha is a genus of moths of the family Crambidae. It contains only one species, Blepharucha zaide, which is found in South Africa.
