= Trigonoorda trygoda =

Scientific classification
- Kingdom: Animalia
- Phylum: Arthropoda
- Clade: Pancrustacea
- Class: Insecta
- Order: Lepidoptera
- Family: Crambidae
- Genus: Trigonoorda
- Species: T. trygoda

Binomial name
- Trigonoorda trygoda (Meyrick, 1897)

Synonyms
- Psammotis trygoda Meyrick, 1897

Species of moth

Trigonoorda trygoda is a moth in the family Crambidae. It was described by Edward Meyrick in 1897. It is found in Australia, where it has been recorded from Queensland, New South Wales and Western Australia. Adults have been recorded on wing in August.
