= Pogonogenys frechini =

Scientific classification
- Kingdom: Animalia
- Phylum: Arthropoda
- Class: Insecta
- Order: Lepidoptera
- Family: Crambidae
- Genus: Pogonogenys
- Species: P. frechini

Binomial name
- Pogonogenys frechini Munroe, 1961

Species of moth

Pogonogenys frechini is a moth in the family Crambidae. It was described by Eugene G. Munroe in 1961. It is found in North America, where it has been recorded from Washington.
