= Boeotarcha caeruleotincta =

Scientific classification
- Kingdom: Animalia
- Phylum: Arthropoda
- Class: Insecta
- Order: Lepidoptera
- Family: Crambidae
- Genus: Boeotarcha
- Species: B. caeruleotincta

Binomial name
- Boeotarcha caeruleotincta Hampson, 1918

Species of moth

Boeotarcha caeruleotincta is a moth in the family Crambidae. It was described by George Hampson in 1918. It is found in Papua New Guinea.
