= Gononoorda neervoorti =

Scientific classification
- Domain: Eukaryota
- Kingdom: Animalia
- Phylum: Arthropoda
- Class: Insecta
- Order: Lepidoptera
- Family: Crambidae
- Genus: Gononoorda
- Species: G. neervoorti

Binomial name
- Gononoorda neervoorti Munroe, 1977

Species of moth

Gononoorda neervoorti is a moth in the family Crambidae. It was described by Eugene G. Munroe in 1977. It is found in Indonesia, where it has been recorded from Java.
