= Noctueliopsis decolorata =

Scientific classification
- Domain: Eukaryota
- Kingdom: Animalia
- Phylum: Arthropoda
- Class: Insecta
- Order: Lepidoptera
- Family: Crambidae
- Genus: Noctueliopsis
- Species: N. decolorata

Binomial name
- Noctueliopsis decolorata Munroe, 1974

Species of moth

Noctueliopsis decolorata is a moth in the family Crambidae. It was described by Eugene G. Munroe in 1974. It is found in Mexico, where it has been recorded from Baja California.
