= Hydrorybina =

Scientific classification
- Domain: Eukaryota
- Kingdom: Animalia
- Phylum: Arthropoda
- Class: Insecta
- Order: Lepidoptera
- Family: Crambidae
- Subfamily: Odontiinae
- Genus: Hydrorybina; Hampson, 1896

Genus of moths

Hydrorybina is a genus of moths of the family Crambidae.

== Species ==
- Hydrorybina fulvescens Munroe, 1977
- Hydrorybina polusalis (Walker, 1859)
- Hydrorybina pryeri (Butler, 1881)
- Hydrorybina violascens (Hampson, 1917)
