= Boeotarcha divisa =

Scientific classification
- Domain: Eukaryota
- Kingdom: Animalia
- Phylum: Arthropoda
- Class: Insecta
- Order: Lepidoptera
- Family: Crambidae
- Genus: Boeotarcha
- Species: B. divisa

Binomial name
- Boeotarcha divisa (T. P. Lucas, 1894)

Synonyms
- Rehimena divisa T. P. Lucas, 1894

Species of moth

Boeotarcha divisa is a moth in the family Crambidae. It was described by Thomas Pennington Lucas in 1894. It is found in Australia, where it has been recorded from Western Australia.

The wingspan is 19–25 mm. The forewings are purple fuscous, tinted with drab scales towards the hindmargin. There is a triangle of orange ochreous dividing the wing almost equally. This triangle is bordered by a black line. There is also a yellow-ochreous spot at the costa and a submarginal purple-black line sharply turning to the hindmargin just before the anal angle. The hindmarginal band is diffused with creamy drab between the veins and there is a fine light hindmarginal line with a row of black dots. The hindwings are fuscous grey with darker veins and lighter ochreous-grey suffusion towards the base.
