= Pitama =

Scientific classification
- Domain: Eukaryota
- Kingdom: Animalia
- Phylum: Arthropoda
- Class: Insecta
- Order: Lepidoptera
- Family: Crambidae
- Subfamily: Odontiinae
- Genus: Pitama; Moore, 1888

Genus of moths

Pitama is a genus of moths of the family Crambidae.

== Species ==
- Pitama hermesalis (Walker, 1859)
- Pitama lativitta Moore, 1888
