= Canalibotys =

Scientific classification
- Kingdom: Animalia
- Phylum: Arthropoda
- Class: Insecta
- Order: Lepidoptera
- Family: Crambidae
- Subfamily: Odontiinae
- Genus: Canalibotys; Maes, 2004
- Species: C. linealis

Binomial name
- Canalibotys linealis Maes, 2004

Genus of moths

Canalibotys is a genus of moths of the family Crambidae. It contains only one species, Canalibotys linealis, which is found in Namibia.
