= Hyalinarcha hyalina =

Scientific classification
- Kingdom: Animalia
- Phylum: Arthropoda
- Class: Insecta
- Order: Lepidoptera
- Family: Crambidae
- Genus: Hyalinarcha
- Species: H. hyalina

Binomial name
- Hyalinarcha hyalina (Hampson, 1913)

Synonyms
- Boeotarcha hyalina Hampson, 1913

Species of moth

Hyalinarcha hyalina is a moth in the family Crambidae. It was described by George Hampson in 1913. It is found in Western New Guinea, Indonesia.
