= Psammobotys fordi =

Scientific classification
- Domain: Eukaryota
- Kingdom: Animalia
- Phylum: Arthropoda
- Class: Insecta
- Order: Lepidoptera
- Family: Crambidae
- Genus: Psammobotys
- Species: P. fordi

Binomial name
- Psammobotys fordi Munroe, 1961

Species of moth

Psammobotys fordi is a moth in the family Crambidae. It was described by Eugene G. Munroe in 1961. It is found in North America, where it has been recorded from California.
