= Hydrorybina polusalis =

Scientific classification
- Kingdom: Animalia
- Phylum: Arthropoda
- Clade: Pancrustacea
- Class: Insecta
- Order: Lepidoptera
- Family: Crambidae
- Genus: Hydrorybina
- Species: H. polusalis

Binomial name
- Hydrorybina polusalis (Walker, 1859)

Synonyms
- Botys polusalis Walker, 1859

Species of moth

Hydrorybina polusalis is a moth in the family Crambidae. It was described by Francis Walker in 1859. It is found on Borneo and in Burma, India (Sikkim) and Australia, where it has been recorded from Queensland.
