= Hyalinarcha =

Scientific classification
- Domain: Eukaryota
- Kingdom: Animalia
- Phylum: Arthropoda
- Class: Insecta
- Order: Lepidoptera
- Family: Crambidae
- Tribe: Eurrhypini
- Genus: Hyalinarcha; Munroe, 1974

Genus of moths

Hyalinarcha is a genus of moths of the family Crambidae.

== Species ==
- Hyalinarcha hyalina (Hampson, 1913)
- Hyalinarcha hyalinalis (Hampson, 1896)
