= Euctenospila =

Scientific classification
- Kingdom: Animalia
- Phylum: Arthropoda
- Class: Insecta
- Order: Lepidoptera
- Family: Crambidae
- Subfamily: Odontiinae
- Genus: Euctenospila; Warren, 1892
- Species: E. castalis

Binomial name
- Euctenospila castalis Warren, 1892

Synonyms
- Loxostege callipeda Meyrick, 1936

Genus of moths

Euctenospila is a genus of moths of the family Crambidae. It contains only one species, Euctenospila castalis, which is found in the Democratic Republic of Congo (West Kasai) and Ethiopia.
