= Neogenesis =

Scientific classification
- Kingdom: Animalia
- Phylum: Arthropoda
- Class: Insecta
- Order: Lepidoptera
- Family: Crambidae
- Subfamily: Odontiinae
- Genus: Neogenesis; Hampson, 1907
- Species: N. flaviplagialis

Binomial name
- Neogenesis flaviplagialis Hampson, 1907

Genus of moths

Neogenesis is a genus of moths of the family Crambidae. It contains only one species, Neogenesis flaviplagialis, which is found in Papua New Guinea.
