= Rhodocantha =

Scientific classification
- Domain: Eukaryota
- Kingdom: Animalia
- Phylum: Arthropoda
- Class: Insecta
- Order: Lepidoptera
- Family: Crambidae
- Tribe: Odontiini
- Genus: Rhodocantha; Munroe, 1961
- Species: R. diagonalis

Binomial name
- Rhodocantha diagonalis Munroe, 1961

Genus of moths

Rhodocantha is a genus of moths of the family Crambidae. It contains only one species, Rhodocantha diagonalis, which is found in North America, where it has been recorded from New Mexico and Texas.
