= Boeotarcha martinalis =

Scientific classification
- Kingdom: Animalia
- Phylum: Arthropoda
- Class: Insecta
- Order: Lepidoptera
- Family: Crambidae
- Genus: Boeotarcha
- Species: B. martinalis

Binomial name
- Boeotarcha martinalis (Walker, 1859)

Synonyms
- Scopula martinalis Walker, 1859; Botys crassicornis Walker, 1866

Species of moth

Boeotarcha martinalis is a moth in the family Crambidae. It was described by Francis Walker in 1859. It is found in India.
