= Thesaurica argentifera =

Scientific classification
- Kingdom: Animalia
- Phylum: Arthropoda
- Class: Insecta
- Order: Lepidoptera
- Family: Crambidae
- Genus: Thesaurica
- Species: T. argentifera

Binomial name
- Thesaurica argentifera (Hampson, 1913)

Synonyms
- Sameodes argentifera Hampson, 1913

Species of moth

Thesaurica argentifera is a moth in the family Crambidae. It was described by George Hampson in 1913. It is found in Australia, where it has been recorded from Queensland.
