= Thesaurica accensalis =

Scientific classification
- Domain: Eukaryota
- Kingdom: Animalia
- Phylum: Arthropoda
- Class: Insecta
- Order: Lepidoptera
- Family: Crambidae
- Genus: Thesaurica
- Species: T. accensalis

Binomial name
- Thesaurica accensalis (C. Swinhoe, 1903)

Synonyms
- Noorda accensalis C. Swinhoe, 1903

Species of moth

Thesaurica accensalis is a moth in the family Crambidae. It was described by Charles Swinhoe in 1903. It is found in Thailand.

The forewings are pale yellow with bright orange-red bands. The hindwings are white with a slight red tinge on the outer border.
