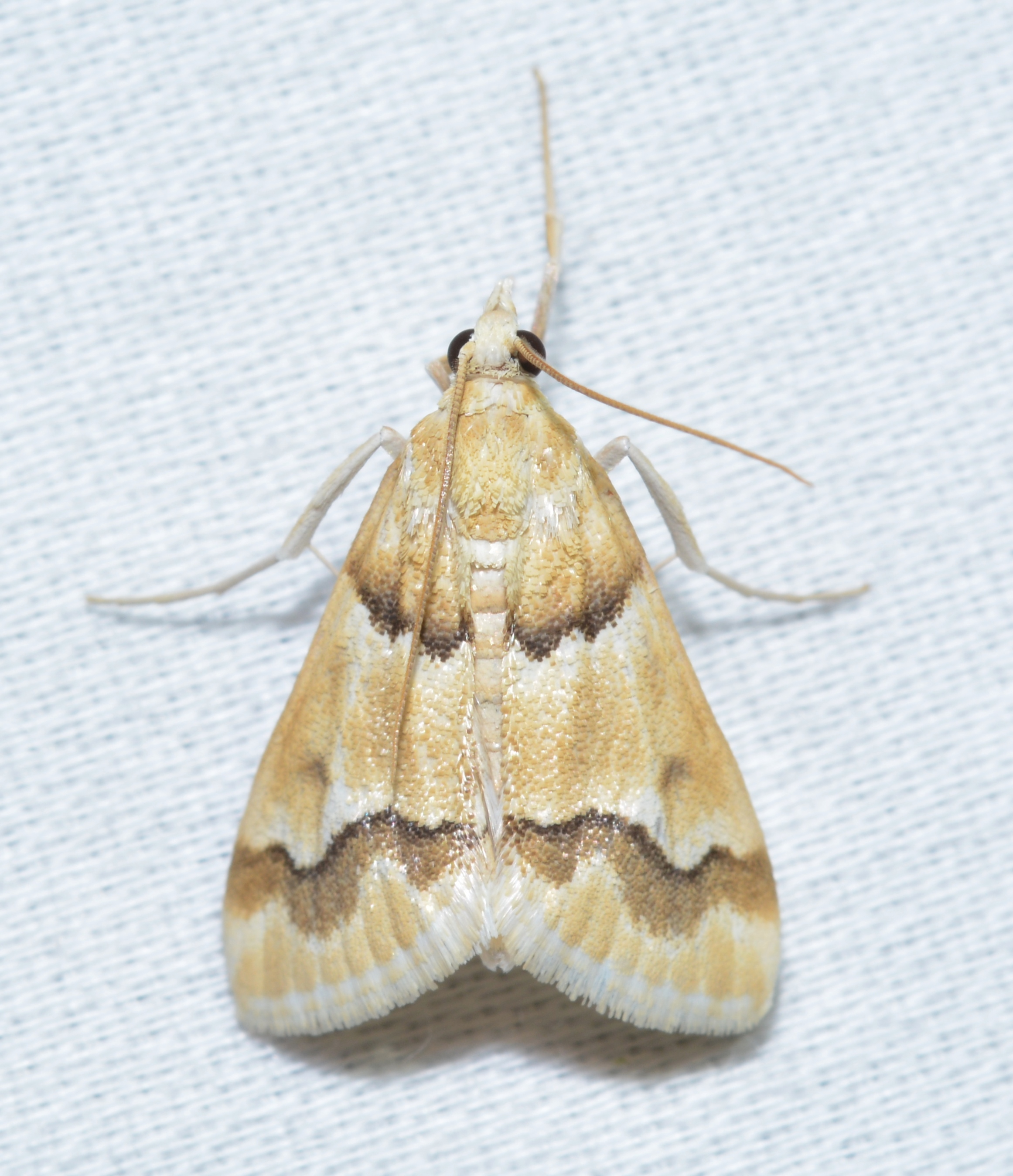

Scientific classification
- Kingdom: Animalia
- Phylum: Arthropoda
- Class: Insecta
- Order: Lepidoptera
- Family: Crambidae
- Tribe: Eurrhypini
- Genus: Pseudoschinia; Munroe, 1961
- Species: P. elautalis

Binomial name
- Pseudoschinia elautalis (Grote, 1881)

Synonyms
- Eurycreon elautalis Grote, 1881; Emprepes magnalis Hulst, 1886

= Pseudoschinia =

Genus of moths

Pseudoschinia is a genus of moths of the family Crambidae. It contains only one species, Pseudoschinia elautalis, which is found in North America, where it has been recorded from Arizona, California, Nevada, New Mexico and Texas.

The length of the forewings is 10–13 mm. The forewings are pale ochreous yellow. The hindwings are white. Adults have been recorded on wing from March to August.

The larvae feed on Ferocactus cylindraceus, Ferocactus wislizeni, Opuntia and Cylindropuntia species.
