= Noctueliopsis bububattalis =

Scientific classification
- Kingdom: Animalia
- Phylum: Arthropoda
- Class: Insecta
- Order: Lepidoptera
- Family: Crambidae
- Genus: Noctueliopsis
- Species: N. bububattalis

Binomial name
- Noctueliopsis bububattalis (Hulst, 1886)

Synonyms
- Botis bububattalis Hulst, 1886; Noctuelia tectalis Barnes & McDunnough, 1914

Species of moth

Noctueliopsis bububattalis is a moth in the family Crambidae. It was described by George Duryea Hulst in 1886. It is found in North America, where it has been recorded from Arizona, California, Colorado, New Mexico, Texas and Utah.

The wingspan is about 17 mm. The forewings are dark maroon brown with a white line just within the middle and another one at the margin. There are two small spots just before the middle of the wing. The hindwings are dark fuscous. Adults are on wing from February to May.
