= Dausara talliusalis =

Scientific classification
- Kingdom: Animalia
- Phylum: Arthropoda
- Class: Insecta
- Order: Lepidoptera
- Family: Crambidae
- Genus: Dausara
- Species: D. talliusalis

Binomial name
- Dausara talliusalis Walker, 1859

Species of moth

Dausara talliusalis is a moth in the family Crambidae. It was described by Francis Walker in 1859. It is found on Borneo.

The forewings are purplish to cupreous brown, but more than half of the basal area is yellowish white. The hindwings are yellowish white, but purplish along the margin.
