= Balaenifrons =

Scientific classification
- Domain: Eukaryota
- Kingdom: Animalia
- Phylum: Arthropoda
- Class: Insecta
- Order: Lepidoptera
- Family: Crambidae
- Subfamily: Odontiinae
- Genus: Balaenifrons; Hampson, 1896

Genus of moths

Balaenifrons is a genus of moths of the family Crambidae.

== Species ==
- Balaenifrons homopteridia Hampson, 1896
- Balaenifrons ochrochroa Hampson, 1917

== Former species ==
- Balaenifrons aryrostrota Hampson, 1917
