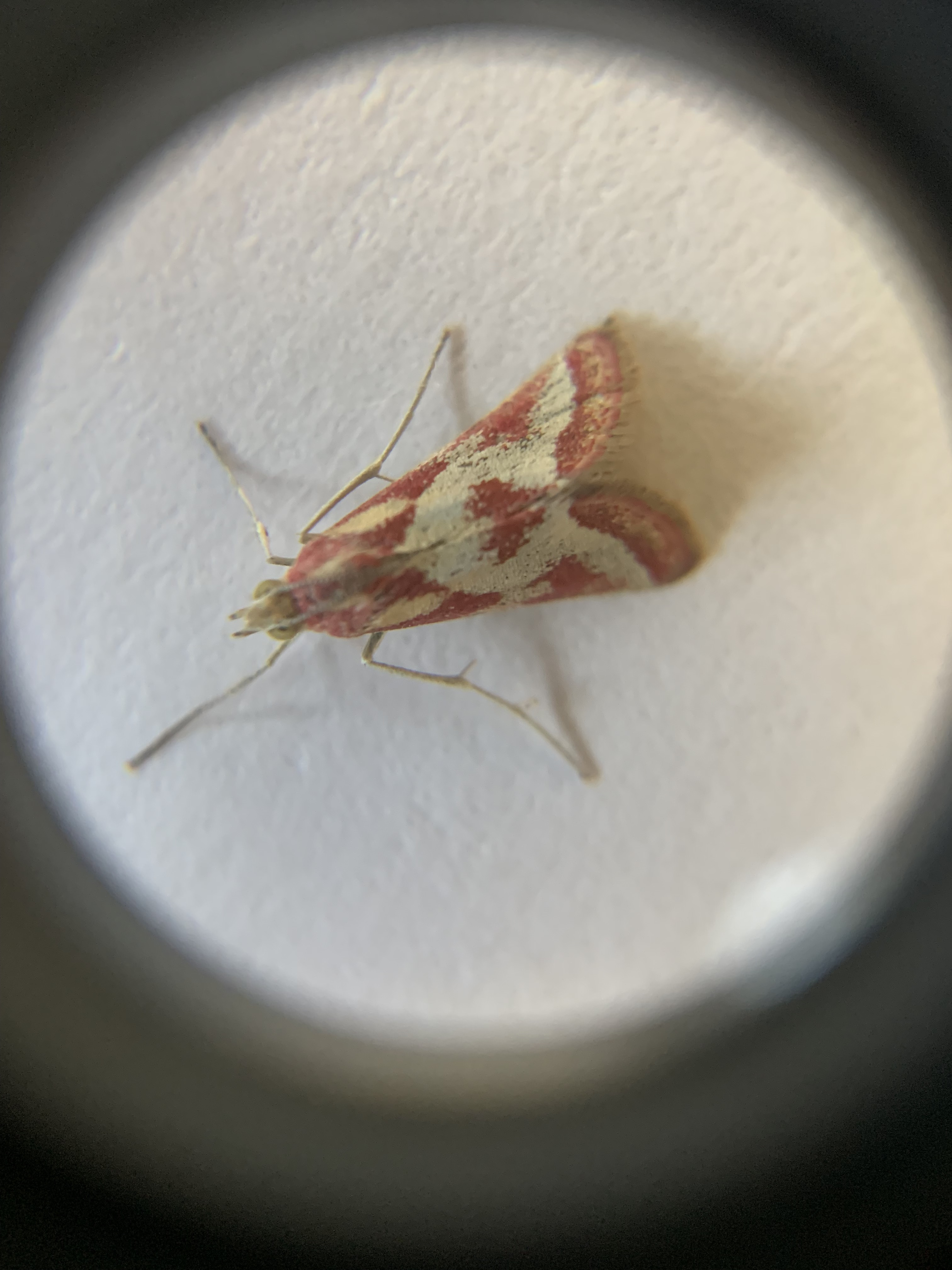
- In Westmorland, California

Scientific classification
- Domain: Eukaryota
- Kingdom: Animalia
- Phylum: Arthropoda
- Class: Insecta
- Order: Lepidoptera
- Family: Crambidae
- Genus: Noctueliopsis
- Species: N. aridalis

Binomial name
- Noctueliopsis aridalis (Barnes & Benjamin, 1922)

Synonyms
- Noctuelia aridalis Barnes & Benjamin, 1922

= Noctueliopsis aridalis =

Species of moth

Noctueliopsis aridalis is a moth in the family Crambidae. It was described by William Barnes and Foster Hendrickson Benjamin in 1922. It is found in North America, where it has been recorded from Arizona, California and Nevada. The habitat consists of deserts.

The length of the forewings is 5.5-6.5 mm. Adults have been recorded on wing from March to June.
