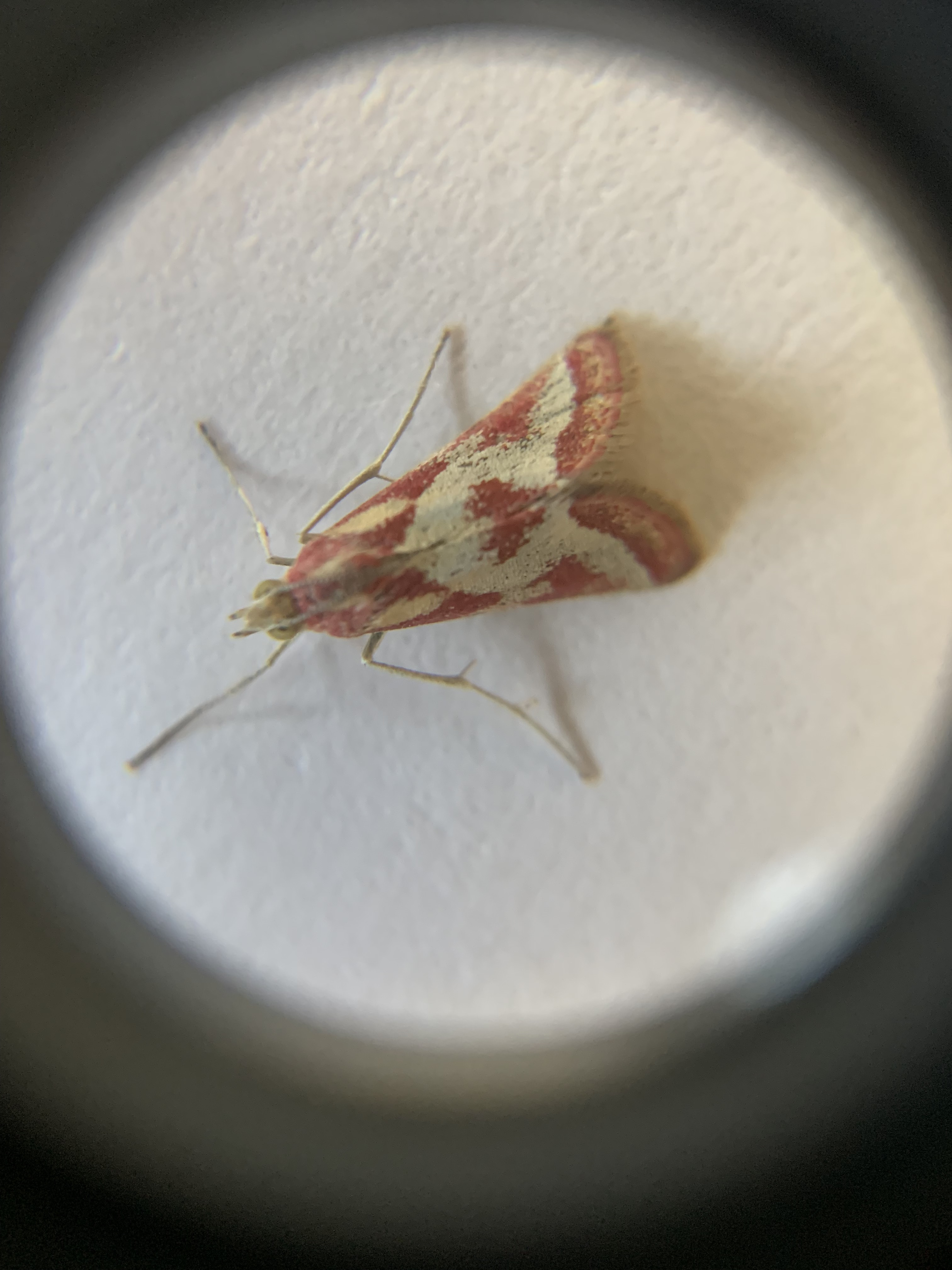

Scientific classification
- Kingdom: Animalia
- Phylum: Arthropoda
- Clade: Pancrustacea
- Class: Insecta
- Order: Lepidoptera
- Family: Crambidae
- Subfamily: Odontiinae
- Genus: Noctueliopsis; Munroe, 1961

= Noctueliopsis =

Genus of moths

Noctueliopsis is a genus of moths of the family Crambidae.

== Species ==
- Noctueliopsis aridalis (Barnes & Benjamin, 1922)
- Noctueliopsis atascaderalis (Munroe, 1951)
- Noctueliopsis australis (Dognin, 1910)
- Noctueliopsis brunnealis Munroe, 1972
- Noctueliopsis bububattalis (Hulst, 1886)
- Noctueliopsis decolorata Munroe, 1974
- Noctueliopsis grandis Munroe, 1974
- Noctueliopsis palmalis (Barnes & McDunnough, 1918)
- Noctueliopsis pandoralis (Barnes & McDunnough, 1914)
- Noctueliopsis puertalis (Barnes & McDunnough, 1912)
- Noctueliopsis rhodoxanthinalis Munroe, 1974
- Noctueliopsis virula (Barnes & McDunnough, 1918)
