= Noctueliopsis atascaderalis =

Scientific classification
- Domain: Eukaryota
- Kingdom: Animalia
- Phylum: Arthropoda
- Class: Insecta
- Order: Lepidoptera
- Family: Crambidae
- Genus: Noctueliopsis
- Species: N. atascaderalis

Binomial name
- Noctueliopsis atascaderalis (Munroe, 1951)

Synonyms
- Noctuelia atascaderalis Munroe, 1951

Species of moth

Noctueliopsis atascaderalis is a moth in the family Crambidae. It was described by Eugene G. Munroe in 1951. It is found in North America, where it has been recorded from California.

The wingspan is 17–18 mm. Adults have been recorded on wing from May to July.
