= Eremanthe =

Scientific classification
- Kingdom: Animalia
- Phylum: Arthropoda
- Class: Insecta
- Order: Lepidoptera
- Family: Crambidae
- Tribe: Odontiini
- Genus: Eremanthe; Munroe, 1972
- Species: E. chemsaki

Binomial name
- Eremanthe chemsaki Munroe, 1972

Genus of moths

Eremanthe is a genus of moths of the family Crambidae. It contains only one species, Eremanthe chemsaki, Chemsak's desert moth, which is found in North America, where it has been recorded from California. It is also found in Mexico.

Adults are diurnal and are on wing from March to May.
