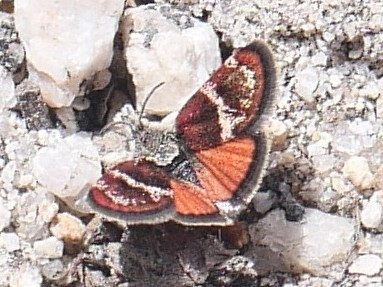

Scientific classification
- Domain: Eukaryota
- Kingdom: Animalia
- Phylum: Arthropoda
- Class: Insecta
- Order: Lepidoptera
- Family: Crambidae
- Genus: Gyros
- Species: G. muirii

Binomial name
- Gyros muirii (H. Edwards, 1881)

Synonyms
- Oribates muirii H. Edwards, 1881; Monocona muirii rubralis Warren, 1892

= Gyros muirii =

Species of moth

Gyros muirii is a species of moth in the family Crambidae. It was described by Henry Edwards in 1881. It is found in North America, where it has been recorded from California, Oregon and Washington.

The wingspan is about 13 mm. The forewings are dull orange, flecked with blackish scales, and the base shading into deep brown. In the central space, there is also a blackish cloud and the posterior margin is blackish. The hindwings are a lighter shade of orange, with a narrow regular marginal border. Adults have been recorded on wing from March to July.

== Subspecies ==
- Gyros muirii muirii
- Gyros muirii rubralis (Warren, 1892) (California)
