= Dausara marginalis =

Scientific classification
- Domain: Eukaryota
- Kingdom: Animalia
- Phylum: Arthropoda
- Class: Insecta
- Order: Lepidoptera
- Family: Crambidae
- Genus: Dausara
- Species: D. marginalis

Binomial name
- Dausara marginalis (Moore, 1877)

Synonyms
- Glyphodes marginalis Moore, 1877; Glyphodes amethysta Butler, 1880

Species of moth

Dausara marginalis is a moth in the family Crambidae. It was described by Frederic Moore in 1877. It is found in India (the Andamans) and Western New Guinea, Indonesia.

The basal two-thirds of the forewings is hyaline (glass like) white and the remaining area is purplish pearly. There is a bronze band from the costa to the inner margin at the basal third, as well as a bronze spot at the end of the cell. The costa is brown bordered.
