= Boeotarcha taenialis =

Scientific classification
- Kingdom: Animalia
- Phylum: Arthropoda
- Class: Insecta
- Order: Lepidoptera
- Family: Crambidae
- Genus: Boeotarcha
- Species: B. taenialis

Binomial name
- Boeotarcha taenialis (Snellen, 1880)

Synonyms
- Botys taenialis Snellen, 1880

Species of moth

Boeotarcha taenialis is a moth in the family Crambidae. It was described by Snellen in 1880. It is found on Sulawesi and in Australia, where it has been recorded from the Northern Territory.

The wingspan is about 24 mm. The forewings are pale purplish grey-brown. There is a yellowish-white crossline with a dark brown border. The hindwings are greyish white with a purplish lustre.
