= Platynoorda =

Scientific classification
- Domain: Eukaryota
- Kingdom: Animalia
- Phylum: Arthropoda
- Class: Insecta
- Order: Lepidoptera
- Family: Crambidae
- Subfamily: Odontiinae
- Genus: Platynoorda; Munroe, 1977
- Species: P. atrivittalis

Binomial name
- Platynoorda atrivittalis Munroe, 1977

Genus of moths

Platynoorda is a genus of moths of the family Crambidae. It contains only one species, Platynoorda atrivittalis, which is found in Indonesia, where it has been recorded from Sabah.
