= Canuza acmias =

Scientific classification
- Kingdom: Animalia
- Phylum: Arthropoda
- Class: Insecta
- Order: Lepidoptera
- Family: Crambidae
- Genus: Canuza
- Species: C. acmias

Binomial name
- Canuza acmias Meyrick, 1897

Species of moth

Canuza acmias is a moth in the family Crambidae. It was described by Edward Meyrick in 1897. It is found in Australia, where it has been recorded from New South Wales.

The wingspan is about 20 mm. The forewings are whitish ochreous, irrorated (sprinkled) and, towards the costa, posteriorly suffused with dull rosy ochreous. There is a white spot on the dorsum beyond the middle. It is irregularly edged with blackish. There is also a straight oblique dark fuscous streak from the apex of the wing towards this spot. The hindwings are semitransparent grey whitish, the veins and a terminal suffusion grey. Adults have been recorded on wing in October.
