= Pitama hermesalis =

Scientific classification
- Kingdom: Animalia
- Phylum: Arthropoda
- Class: Insecta
- Order: Lepidoptera
- Family: Crambidae
- Genus: Pitama
- Species: P. hermesalis

Binomial name
- Pitama hermesalis (Walker, 1859)

Synonyms
- Tobata hermesalis Walker, 1859

Species of moth

Pitama hermesalis is a moth in the family Crambidae. It was described by Francis Walker in 1859. It is found in Borneo.
