= Cymbopteryx unilinealis =

Scientific classification
- Domain: Eukaryota
- Kingdom: Animalia
- Phylum: Arthropoda
- Class: Insecta
- Order: Lepidoptera
- Family: Crambidae
- Genus: Cymbopteryx
- Species: C. unilinealis

Binomial name
- Cymbopteryx unilinealis (Barnes & McDunnough, 1918)

Synonyms
- Loxostege unilinealis Barnes & McDunnough, 1918; Loxostegopsis phaeopasta Hampson, 1919

Species of moth

Cymbopteryx unilinealis is a moth in the family Crambidae. It was described by William Barnes and James Halliday McDunnough in 1918. It is found in North America, where it has been recorded from Arizona.

The wingspan is 14–16 mm. The forewings are white, irrorated (speckled) with dark brown and with a slight dark brown postmedial line, as well as a fine dark brown terminal line. The hindwings are white, irrorated with brown. Adults have been recorded on wing in January and July.
