= Phlyctaenomorpha =

Scientific classification
- Domain: Eukaryota
- Kingdom: Animalia
- Phylum: Arthropoda
- Class: Insecta
- Order: Lepidoptera
- Family: Crambidae
- Subfamily: Odontiinae
- Genus: Phlyctaenomorpha; Amsel, 1970

Genus of moths

Phlyctaenomorpha is a genus of moths of the family Crambidae.

== Species ==
- Phlyctaenomorpha afghanalis Amsel, 1970
- Phlyctaenomorpha sinuosalis (Cerf, [1910])
