= Heliothelopsis arbutalis =

Scientific classification
- Kingdom: Animalia
- Phylum: Arthropoda
- Class: Insecta
- Order: Lepidoptera
- Family: Crambidae
- Genus: Heliothelopsis
- Species: H. arbutalis

Binomial name
- Heliothelopsis arbutalis (Snellen, 1875)

Synonyms
- Aporodes arbutalis Snellen, 1875; Panameria rhea Druce, 1894; Noctuelia rhea

Species of moth

Heliothelopsis arbutalis is a moth in the family Crambidae. It was described by Snellen in 1875. It is found in Mexico and southern Arizona.

The wingspan is about 25 mm. The forewings are dark brown with a narrowgrey submarginal line from the apex to the anal angle. The hindwings are black, crossed in the middle with a pale yellow-orange band from the costal margin to the inner margin. Adults have been recorded on wing in May and September.
