= Ertrica =

Scientific classification
- Kingdom: Animalia
- Phylum: Arthropoda
- Class: Insecta
- Order: Lepidoptera
- Family: Crambidae
- Subfamily: Odontiinae
- Genus: Ertrica; Walker, 1866
- Species: E. purpurealis

Binomial name
- Ertrica purpurealis Walker, [1866]

Genus of moths

Ertrica is a genus of moths of the family Crambidae. It contains only one species, Ertrica purpurealis, which is found in Colombia.
