= Trigonoorda rhodopa =

Scientific classification
- Domain: Eukaryota
- Kingdom: Animalia
- Phylum: Arthropoda
- Class: Insecta
- Order: Lepidoptera
- Family: Crambidae
- Genus: Trigonoorda
- Species: T. rhodopa

Binomial name
- Trigonoorda rhodopa (Turner, 1908)

Synonyms
- Noorda rhodopa Turner, 1908

Species of moth

Trigonoorda rhodopa is a moth in the family Crambidae. It was described by Alfred Jefferis Turner in 1908. It is found in Australia, where it has been recorded from Queensland and the Northern Territory.

The wingspan is about 20 mm. The forewings are pale rosy with fuscous lines. The hindwings are ochreous whitish. Adults have been recorded on wing in November.
