= Mecynarcha =

Scientific classification
- Domain: Eukaryota
- Kingdom: Animalia
- Phylum: Arthropoda
- Class: Insecta
- Order: Lepidoptera
- Family: Crambidae
- Tribe: Eurrhypini
- Genus: Mecynarcha; Munroe, 1974
- Species: M. apicalis

Binomial name
- Mecynarcha apicalis (Hampson, 1899)

Synonyms
- Mecyna apicalis Hampson, 1899

Genus of moths

Mecynarcha is a genus of moths of the family Crambidae. It contains only one species, Mecynarcha apicalis, which is found in Brazil (Lower Amazons).

The wingspan is about 28 mm. The forewings are yellow-brown, suffused with ferruginous red and irrorated and suffused with fuscous. There is a marginal series of black specks. The hindwings are hyaline yellow, the veins streaked with fuscous and with a fuscous marginal band.
