= Noctueliopsis puertalis =

Scientific classification
- Domain: Eukaryota
- Kingdom: Animalia
- Phylum: Arthropoda
- Class: Insecta
- Order: Lepidoptera
- Family: Crambidae
- Genus: Noctueliopsis
- Species: N. puertalis

Binomial name
- Noctueliopsis puertalis (Barnes & McDunnough, 1912)

Synonyms
- Noctuelia puertalis Barnes & McDunnough, 1912

Species of moth

Noctueliopsis puertalis is a moth in the family Crambidae. It was described by William Barnes and James Halliday McDunnough in 1912. It is found in North America, where it has been recorded from Arizona, California and Texas.

The wingspan is about 15 mm. The forewings are pale ocherous, heavily shaded with brown, especially in the basal and terminal areas, leaving the median space as a broad paler band across the wings. There are faint traces of a dark basal line. The hindwings are smoky brown. Adults have been recorded on wing from March to May and from August to September.
