= Kerbela turcomanica =

Scientific classification
- Domain: Eukaryota
- Kingdom: Animalia
- Phylum: Arthropoda
- Class: Insecta
- Order: Lepidoptera
- Family: Crambidae
- Genus: Kerbela
- Species: K. turcomanica

Binomial name
- Kerbela turcomanica (Christoph, 1877)

Synonyms
- Anthophilodes turcomanica Christoph, 1877

Species of moth

Kerbela turcomanica is a moth in the family Crambidae. It was described by Hugo Theodor Christoph in 1877. It is found in Turkmenistan.
