= Dichozoma =

Scientific classification
- Kingdom: Animalia
- Phylum: Arthropoda
- Class: Insecta
- Order: Lepidoptera
- Family: Crambidae
- Tribe: Odontiini
- Genus: Dichozoma; Munroe, 1961
- Species: D. parvipicta

Binomial name
- Dichozoma parvipicta (Barnes & McDunnough, 1918)

Synonyms
- Loxostege parvipicta Barnes & McDunnough, 1918

Genus of moths

Dichozoma is a monotypic moth genus of the family Crambidae erected by Eugene G. Munroe in 1961. Its only species, Dichozoma parvipicta, was first described by William Barnes and James Halliday McDunnough in 1918. It is found in North America, where it has been recorded from Arizona, California, Utah and Texas.

The length of the forewings is 4.5–6 mm. The forewings are pale yellow, crossed by two parallel bands of pinkish purple. The costa is also pinkish purple up to the first line. There is a large pinkish-purple discal spot. The hindwings are white in males and shaded with pinkish terminally in females. Adults have been recorded on wing from March to May and from July to September.
