= Usgentia =

Scientific classification
- Domain: Eukaryota
- Kingdom: Animalia
- Phylum: Arthropoda
- Class: Insecta
- Order: Lepidoptera
- Family: Crambidae
- Subfamily: Odontiinae
- Genus: Usgentia; Amsel, 1949

Genus of moths

Usgentia is a genus of moths of the family Crambidae.

== Species ==
- Usgentia quadridentale (Zerny, 1914)
- Usgentia vespertalis (Herrich-Schäffer, 1851)
