= Cymbopteryx pseudobelialis =

Scientific classification
- Domain: Eukaryota
- Kingdom: Animalia
- Phylum: Arthropoda
- Class: Insecta
- Order: Lepidoptera
- Family: Crambidae
- Genus: Cymbopteryx
- Species: C. pseudobelialis

Binomial name
- Cymbopteryx pseudobelialis Munroe, 1974

Species of moth

Cymbopteryx pseudobelialis is a moth in the family Crambidae. It was described by Eugene G. Munroe in 1974. It is found in Bolivia.
