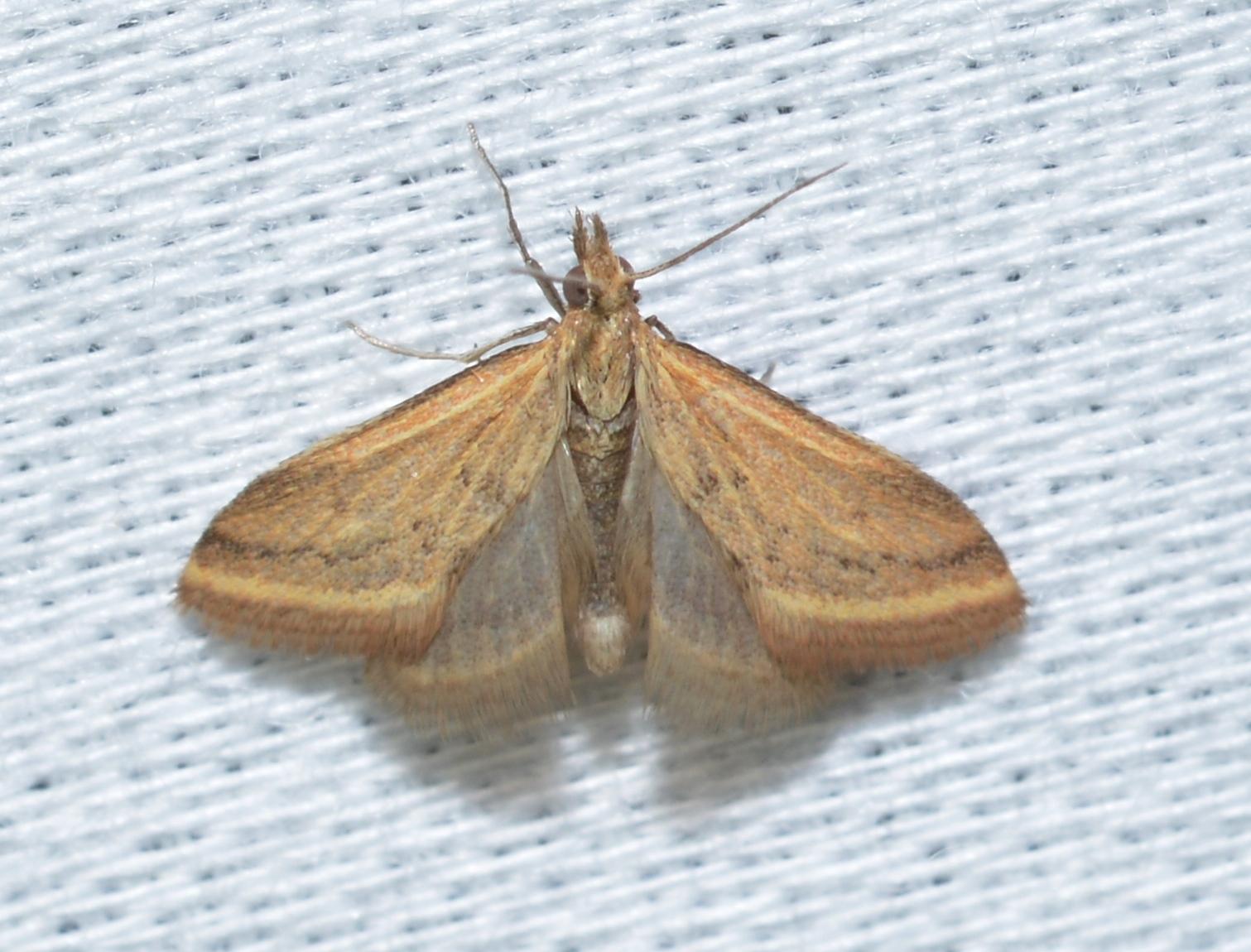

Scientific classification
- Kingdom: Animalia
- Phylum: Arthropoda
- Class: Insecta
- Order: Lepidoptera
- Family: Crambidae
- Genus: Microtheoris
- Species: M. ophionalis

Binomial name
- Microtheoris ophionalis (Walker, 1859)

Synonyms
- Botis sesquialteralis Zeller, 1873; Botis nasonialis Zeller, 1873

= Microtheoris ophionalis =

Species of moth

Microtheoris ophionalis, the yellow-veined moth, is a moth in the family Crambidae. It was described by Francis Walker in 1859. It is found from southern Canada, through the United States and Mexico to South America.

The length of the forewings 5.5–7 mm. Adults are on wing from May to October in the northern part of the range.

== Subspecies ==
- Microtheoris ophionalis ophionalis
- Microtheoris ophionalis baboquivariensis Munroe, 1961 (Arizona)
- Microtheoris ophionalis eremica Munroe, 1961 (Texas)
- Microtheoris ophionalis lacustris Munroe, 1961 (Ontario)
- Microtheoris ophionalis occidentalis Munroe, 1961 (British Columbia)
