= Chrismania =

Scientific classification
- Domain: Eukaryota
- Kingdom: Animalia
- Phylum: Arthropoda
- Class: Insecta
- Order: Lepidoptera
- Family: Crambidae
- Subfamily: Odontiinae
- Tribe: Odontiini
- Genus: Chrismania; Barnes & McDunnough, 1914
- Species: C. pictipennalis

Binomial name
- Chrismania pictipennalis Barnes & McDunnough, 1914

Genus of moths

Chrismania is a monotypic moth genus of the family Crambidae. Its only species, Chrismania pictipennalis, is found in North America, where it has been recorded from southern California and Arizona. Both the genus and species were first described by William Barnes and James Halliday McDunnough in 1914.

The length of the forewings is 7–10 mm. The forewings are deep olive brown, heavily scaled with pale whitish ocherous in the medial area. The hindwings are pale orange red. Adults have been recorded on wing from March to May.
