= Probalaenifrons =

Scientific classification
- Domain: Eukaryota
- Kingdom: Animalia
- Phylum: Arthropoda
- Class: Insecta
- Order: Lepidoptera
- Family: Crambidae
- Subfamily: Odontiinae
- Genus: Probalaenifrons; Munroe, 1977
- Species: P. argillacea

Binomial name
- Probalaenifrons argillacea Munroe, 1977

Genus of moths

Probalaenifrons is a genus of moths of the family Crambidae. It contains only one species, Probalaenifrons argillacea, which is found in Indonesia.
