= Hydrorybina violascens =

Scientific classification
- Kingdom: Animalia
- Phylum: Arthropoda
- Clade: Pancrustacea
- Class: Insecta
- Order: Lepidoptera
- Family: Crambidae
- Genus: Hydrorybina
- Species: H. violascens

Binomial name
- Hydrorybina violascens (Hampson, 1917)

Synonyms
- Clupeosoma violascens Hampson, 1917

Species of moth

Hydrorybina violascens is a moth in the family Crambidae. It was described by George Hampson in 1917. It is found on Borneo.

The wingspan is about 16 mm. The forewings are cupreous-red brown with a purplish gloss. There is an oblique dark brown antemedial line and a dark discoidal bar. The postmedial line is black brown and the termen is black brown with a silvery gloss. The hindwings are cupreous-red brown with a purplish gloss. The costal area is whitish with some dark irroration (speckling) below the end of the cell, as well as a black postmedial line.
