= Noctueliopsis pandoralis =

Scientific classification
- Domain: Eukaryota
- Kingdom: Animalia
- Phylum: Arthropoda
- Class: Insecta
- Order: Lepidoptera
- Family: Crambidae
- Genus: Noctueliopsis
- Species: N. pandoralis

Binomial name
- Noctueliopsis pandoralis (Barnes & McDunnough, 1914)

Synonyms
- Noctuelia pandoralis Barnes & McDunnough, 1914; Pyrausta pandoralis minimistricta Dyar, 1913

Species of moth

Noctueliopsis pandoralis is a moth in the family Crambidae. It was described by William Barnes and James Halliday McDunnough in 1914. It is found in Mexico and the southern United States, where it has been recorded from New Mexico.

The wingspan is about 12 mm. The forewings are pale olive brown, the basal area suffused with pink, defined outwardly by slight white scaling. The terminal area is pink, preceded by a white shade. The hindwings are dark smoky with a slight whitish shade above the anal angle and subterminally. Adults have been recorded on wing in September.

== Subspecies ==
- Noctueliopsis pandoralis pandoralis
- Noctueliopsis pandoralis minimistricta (Dyar, 1913) (Mexico: Tehuacan)
