= Microtheoris =

Scientific classification
- Domain: Eukaryota
- Kingdom: Animalia
- Phylum: Arthropoda
- Class: Insecta
- Order: Lepidoptera
- Family: Crambidae
- Tribe: Odontiini
- Genus: Microtheoris; Meyrick, 1932

Genus of moths

Microtheoris is a genus of moths of the family Crambidae.

== Species ==
- Microtheoris ophionalis (Walker, 1859)
- Microtheoris vibicalis (Zeller, 1873)

== Former species ==
- Microtheoris sesquialteralis (Zeller, 1873)
