= Noctueliopsis palmalis =

Scientific classification
- Domain: Eukaryota
- Kingdom: Animalia
- Phylum: Arthropoda
- Class: Insecta
- Order: Lepidoptera
- Family: Crambidae
- Genus: Noctueliopsis
- Species: N. palmalis

Binomial name
- Noctueliopsis palmalis (Barnes & McDunnough, 1918)

Synonyms
- Noctuelia palmalis Barnes & McDunnough, 1918

Species of moth

Noctueliopsis palmalis is a moth in the family Crambidae. It was described by William Barnes and James Halliday McDunnough in 1918. It is found in North America, where it has been recorded from California, Nevada and Texas. The habitat consists of high and low elevation deserts.

The length of the forewings is 6-8.5 mm. The forewings are brown with a reddish tinge. Adults are on wing from March to June.
