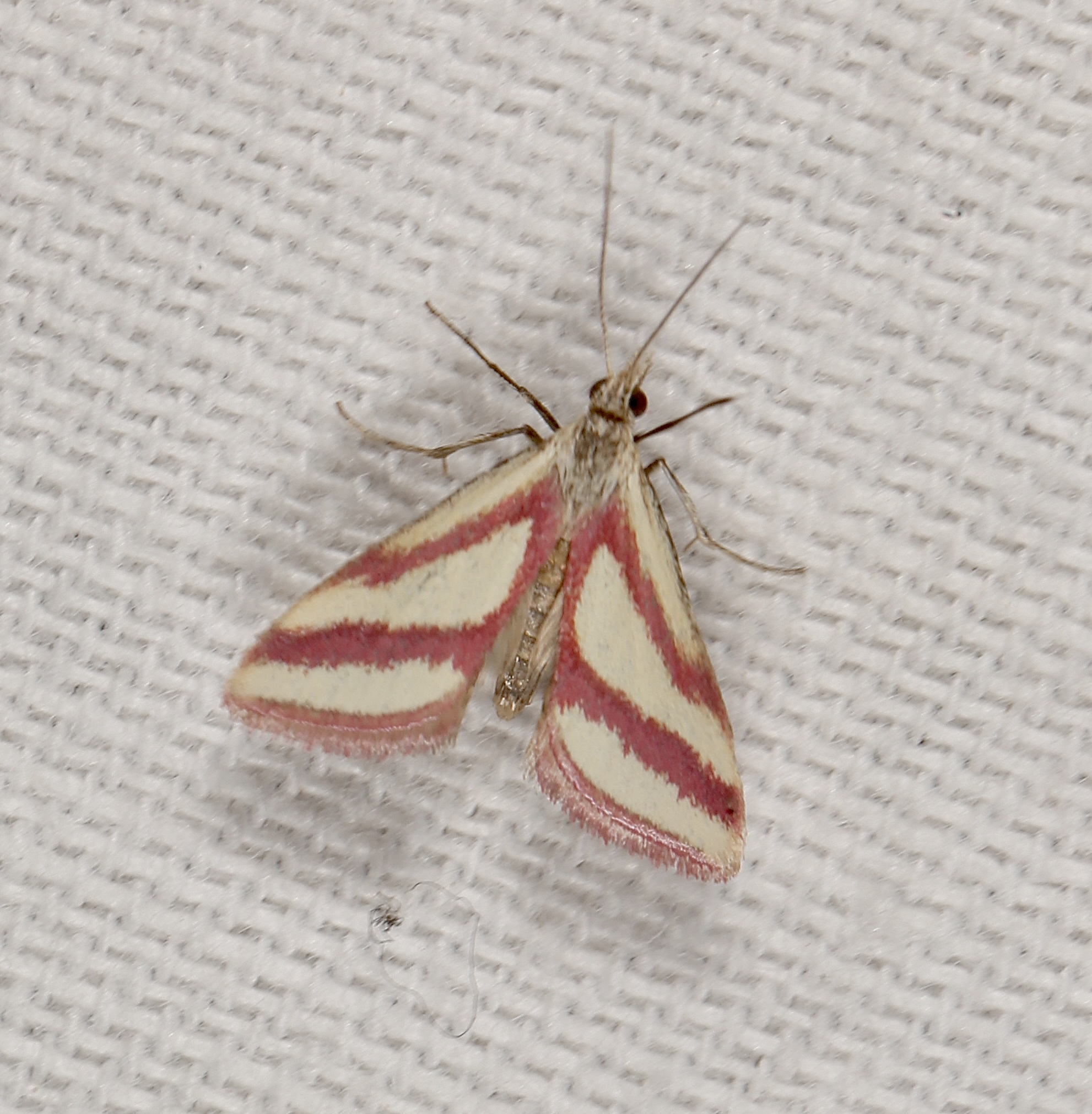
- Microtheoris vibicalis, Texas

Scientific classification
- Kingdom: Animalia
- Phylum: Arthropoda
- Clade: Pancrustacea
- Class: Insecta
- Order: Lepidoptera
- Family: Crambidae
- Genus: Microtheoris
- Species: M. vibicalis

Binomial name
- Microtheoris vibicalis (Zeller, 1873)

Synonyms
- Botis vibicalis Zeller, 1873; Botis ribicalis Zeller, 1873

= Microtheoris vibicalis =

Species of moth

Microtheoris vibicalis, the whip-marked snout moth, is a moth in the family Crambidae. It was described by Zeller in 1873. It is found in North America, where it has been recorded from Kansas, New Mexico, Oklahoma and Texas.

The wingspan is about 11 mm. Adults have been recorded on wing from March to September.
