= Usgentia quadridentale =

Scientific classification
- Domain: Eukaryota
- Kingdom: Animalia
- Phylum: Arthropoda
- Class: Insecta
- Order: Lepidoptera
- Family: Crambidae
- Genus: Usgentia
- Species: U. quadridentale

Binomial name
- Usgentia quadridentale (Zerny, 1914)

Synonyms
- Tegostoma quadridentale Zerny, 1914

Species of moth

Usgentia quadridentale is a species of moth in the family Crambidae. It is found in Kyrgyzstan.
