= Syntonarcha vulnerata =

Scientific classification
- Domain: Eukaryota
- Kingdom: Animalia
- Phylum: Arthropoda
- Class: Insecta
- Order: Lepidoptera
- Family: Crambidae
- Genus: Syntonarcha
- Species: S. vulnerata

Binomial name
- Syntonarcha vulnerata T. P. Lucas, 1894

Species of moth

Syntonarcha vulnerata is a moth in the family Crambidae. It was described by Thomas Pennington Lucas in 1894. It is found in Australia where it has been recorded from Queensland and New South Wales.
