= Plumipalpiella =

Scientific classification
- Kingdom: Animalia
- Phylum: Arthropoda
- Class: Insecta
- Order: Lepidoptera
- Family: Crambidae
- Tribe: Odontiini
- Genus: Plumipalpiella; Munroe, 1995
- Species: P. martini

Binomial name
- Plumipalpiella martini (Munroe, 1961)

Synonyms
- Plumipalpia Munroe, 1961; Plumipalpia martini Munroe, 1961

Genus of moths

Plumipalpiella is a genus of moths of the family Crambidae. It contains only one species, Plumipalpiella martini, which is found in North America, where it has been recorded from California.
