= Noordodes magnificalis =

Scientific classification
- Kingdom: Animalia
- Phylum: Arthropoda
- Clade: Pancrustacea
- Class: Insecta
- Order: Lepidoptera
- Family: Crambidae
- Genus: Noordodes
- Species: N. magnificalis

Binomial name
- Noordodes magnificalis (Rothschild, 1916)

Synonyms
- Noorda magnificalis Rothschild, 1916

Species of moth

Noordodes magnificalis is a moth in the family Crambidae. It was described by Walter Rothschild in 1916. It is found in Indonesia, where it has been recorded in Irian Jaya.

The wingspan is 23–28 mm. The forewings are canary yellow, the coastal area and final margin broadly steel purple. There is a steel purple median blotch from below the cell to the inner margin. The hindwings are buff, but the basal part of the lower half is canary yellow with two broad streaks and a narrow terminal edge of steel purple.
