= Turania russulalis =

Scientific classification
- Domain: Eukaryota
- Kingdom: Animalia
- Phylum: Arthropoda
- Class: Insecta
- Order: Lepidoptera
- Family: Crambidae
- Genus: Turania
- Species: T. russulalis

Binomial name
- Turania russulalis (Christoph, 1877)

Synonyms
- Hypotia russulalis Christoph, 1877; Noctuelia baryscia Meyrick, 1936

Species of moth

Turania russulalis is a moth in the family Crambidae. It was described by Hugo Theodor Christoph in 1877. It is found in Iraq and Iran.
