= Irigilla =

Scientific classification
- Domain: Eukaryota
- Kingdom: Animalia
- Phylum: Arthropoda
- Class: Insecta
- Order: Lepidoptera
- Family: Crambidae
- Subfamily: Odontiinae
- Genus: Irigilla; C. Swinhoe, 1900
- Species: I. nypsiusalis

Binomial name
- Irigilla nypsiusalis (Walker, 1859)

Synonyms
- Rhodaria nypsiusalis Walker, 1859; Pionea nypsiusalis

Genus of moths

Irigilla is a monotypic moth genus of the family Crambidae erected by Charles Swinhoe in 1900. Its only species, Irigilla nypsiusalis, was first described by Francis Walker in 1859. It is found on Borneo.
