= Turania pentodontalis =

Scientific classification
- Domain: Eukaryota
- Kingdom: Animalia
- Phylum: Arthropoda
- Class: Insecta
- Order: Lepidoptera
- Family: Crambidae
- Genus: Turania
- Species: T. pentodontalis

Binomial name
- Turania pentodontalis (Erschoff, 1874)

Synonyms
- Emprepes pentodontalis Erschoff, 1874

Species of moth

Turania pentodontalis is a moth in the family Crambidae. It was described by Nikolay Grigoryevich Erschoff in 1874. It is found in Central Asia, including Turkmenistan, Iraq and Iran.
