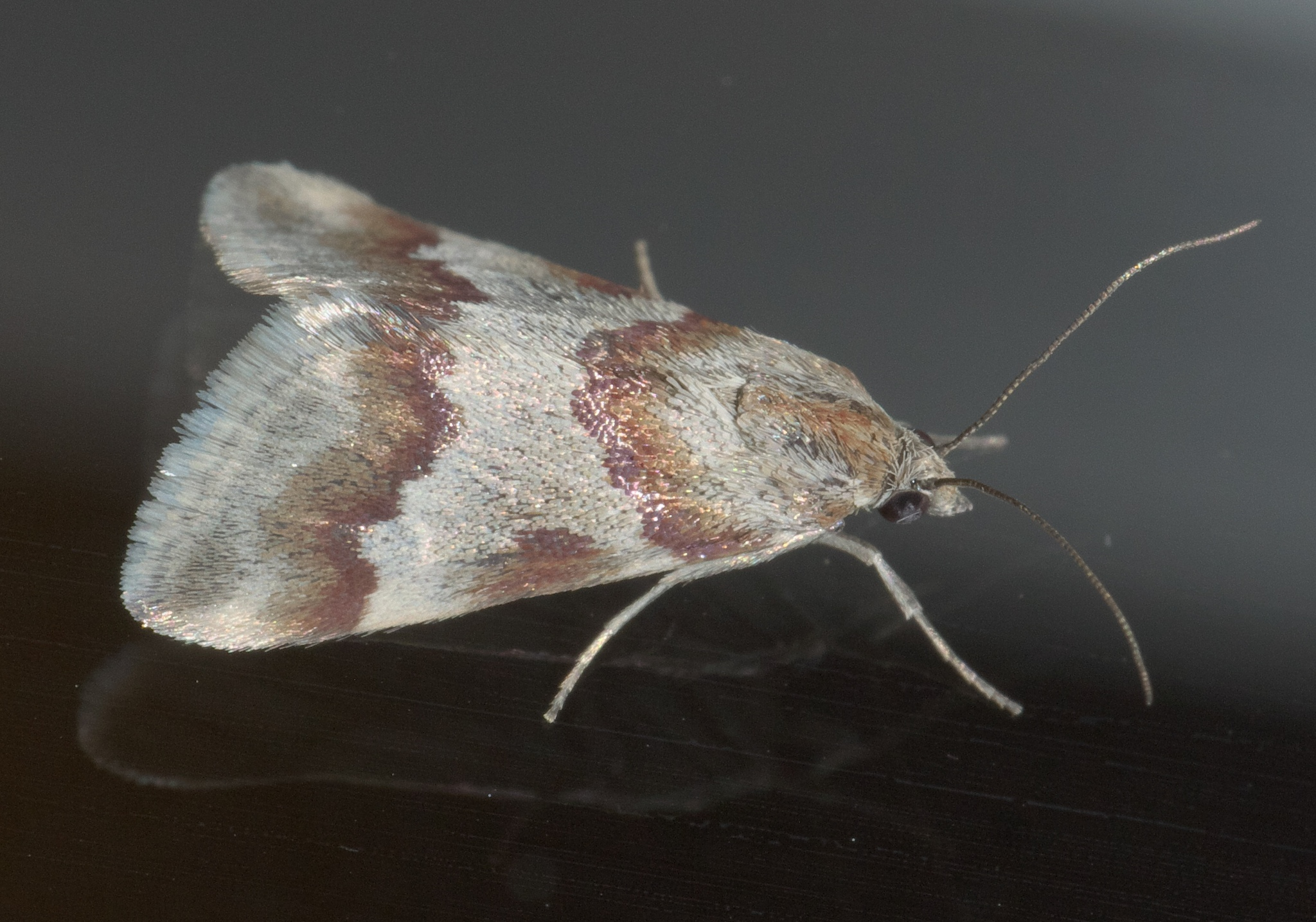
- Mimoschinia rufofascialis, New Mexico

Scientific classification
- Kingdom: Animalia
- Phylum: Arthropoda
- Clade: Pancrustacea
- Class: Insecta
- Order: Lepidoptera
- Family: Crambidae
- Tribe: Eurrhypini
- Genus: Mimoschinia; Warren, 1892
- Species: M. rufofascialis

Binomial name
- Mimoschinia rufofascialis (Stephens, 1834)

Synonyms
- Ennychia rufofascialis Stephens, 1834; Eustrotia rufofascialis decorata Druce, 1898; Emprepes rufofascialis novalis Grote, 1876; Emprepes rufofascialis nuchalis Grote, 1878; Anthophila perviana Walker, 1865; Pyralis gelidalis Walker, 1866; Thelcteria costaemaculalis Snellen, 1887

= Mimoschinia =

Genus of moths

Mimoschinia is a genus of moths of the family Crambidae. It contains only one species, Mimoschinia rufofascialis, the rufous-banded pyralid moth or barberpole caterpillar, which is found in the Caribbean, from Alberta to British Columbia, south to Texas and California and in Mexico.

The wingspan is 14–18 mm. Adults have been recorded on wing from January to October, with most records from June to September.

The larvae feed on various Malvaceae species, including Malvastrum, Abutilon, Wissadula, Sida, Alcea and Malvella species. They feed on the seeds of their host plant.

== Subspecies ==
- Mimoschinia rufofascialis rufofascialis (Caribbean)
- Mimoschinia rufofascialis decorata (Druce, 1898) (Arizona, Mexico)
- Mimoschinia rufofascialis novalis (Grote, 1876) (from Alberta to British Columbia, south to Texas and California)
- Mimoschinia rufofascialis nuchalis (Grote, 1878) (California)
