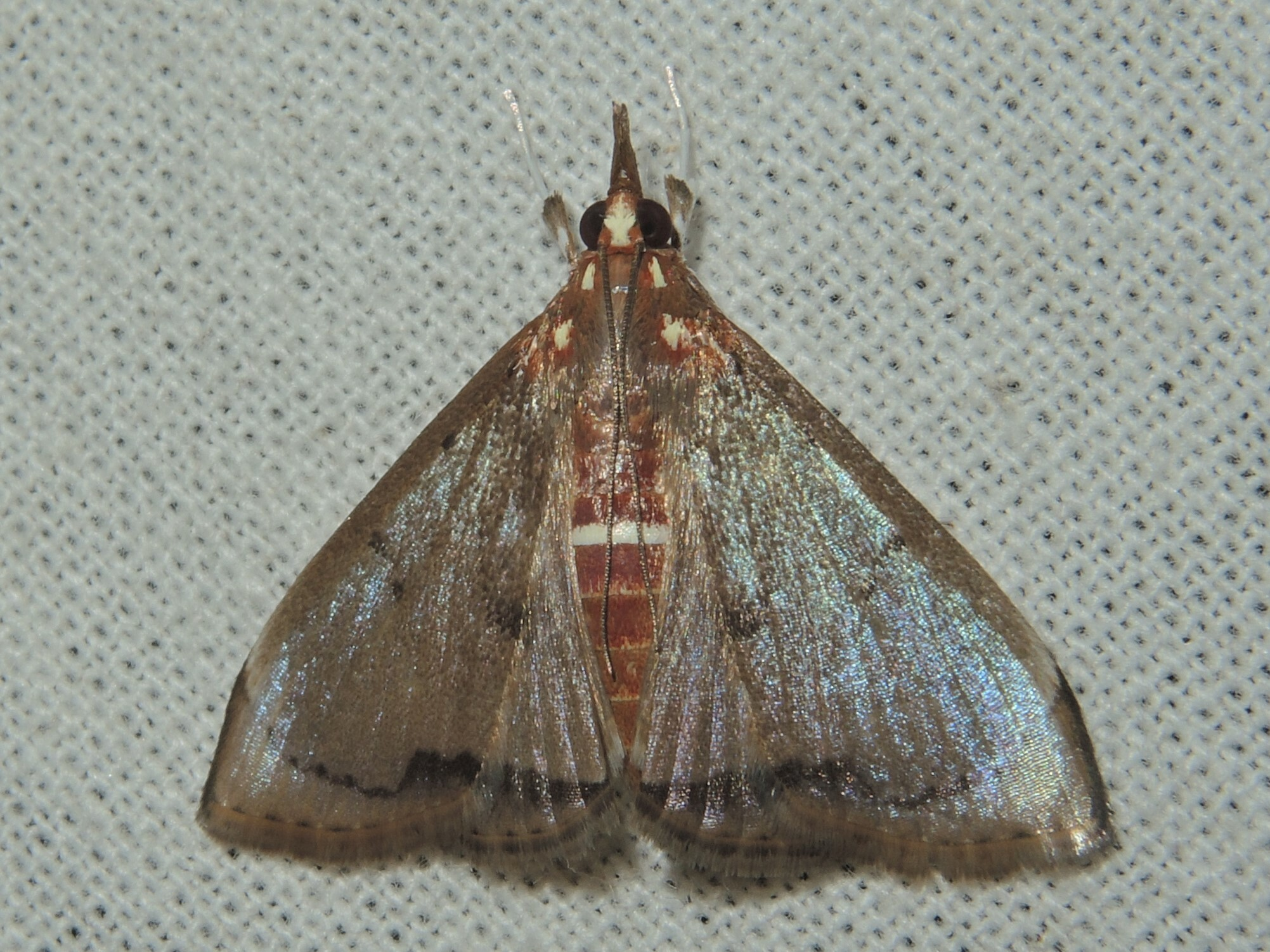
- Deanolis, India

Scientific classification
- Domain: Eukaryota
- Kingdom: Animalia
- Phylum: Arthropoda
- Class: Insecta
- Order: Lepidoptera
- Family: Crambidae
- Subfamily: Odontiinae
- Genus: Deanolis; Snellen, 1899

= Deanolis =

Genus of moths

Deanolis is a genus of moths of the family Crambidae.

== Species ==
- Deanolis iriocapna (Meyrick, 1938)
- Deanolis sublimbalis Snellen, 1899
