= Dausara chiangmai =

Scientific classification
- Domain: Eukaryota
- Kingdom: Animalia
- Phylum: Arthropoda
- Class: Insecta
- Order: Lepidoptera
- Family: Crambidae
- Genus: Dausara
- Species: D. chiangmai

Binomial name
- Dausara chiangmai Yoshiyasu, 1995

Species of moth

Dausara chiangmai is a moth in the family Crambidae. It was described by Yoshiyasu in 1995. It is found in Thailand.
