= Gononoorda =

Scientific classification
- Domain: Eukaryota
- Kingdom: Animalia
- Phylum: Arthropoda
- Class: Insecta
- Order: Lepidoptera
- Family: Crambidae
- Subfamily: Odontiinae
- Genus: Gononoorda; Munroe, 1977

Genus of moths

Gononoorda is a genus of moths of the family Crambidae.

== Species ==
- Gononoorda jacobsoni Munroe, 1977
- Gononoorda neervoorti Munroe, 1977
