= Sobanga =

Scientific classification
- Kingdom: Animalia
- Phylum: Arthropoda
- Class: Insecta
- Order: Lepidoptera
- Family: Crambidae
- Subfamily: Odontiinae
- Genus: Sobanga; Munroe, 1964
- Species: S. rutilalis

Binomial name
- Sobanga rutilalis (Walker, 1862)

Synonyms
- Glyphodes rutilalis Walker, 1862; Glyphodes suavis C. Felder, R. Felder & Rogenhofer, 1875

Genus of moths

Sobanga is a genus of moths of the family Crambidae. It contains only one species, Sobanga rutilalis, which is found in Brazil.
