= Trigonoorda rhodea =

Scientific classification
- Domain: Eukaryota
- Kingdom: Animalia
- Phylum: Arthropoda
- Class: Insecta
- Order: Lepidoptera
- Family: Crambidae
- Genus: Trigonoorda
- Species: T. rhodea

Binomial name
- Trigonoorda rhodea (Lower, 1905)

Synonyms
- Clupeosoma rhodea Lower, 1905

Species of moth

Trigonoorda rhodea is a moth in the family Crambidae. It was described by Oswald Bertram Lower in 1905. It is found in Australia, where it has been recorded from Queensland and the Northern Territory.

The wingspan is about 18 mm. The forewings are reddish carmine, tinged with coppery-metallic scales and with deep reddish-fuscous markings. The termen is suffused with pale fuscous purple. The hindwings are pale yellow, suffused with reddish carmine on the terminal third. Adults have been recorded on wing in October and December.
