= Cymbopteryx =

Scientific classification
- Domain: Eukaryota
- Kingdom: Animalia
- Phylum: Arthropoda
- Class: Insecta
- Order: Lepidoptera
- Family: Crambidae
- Subfamily: Odontiinae
- Genus: Cymbopteryx; Munroe, 1961

Genus of moths

Cymbopteryx is a genus of moths of the family Crambidae.

== Species ==
- Cymbopteryx diffusa Munroe, 1974
- Cymbopteryx extralinea (Dyar in Dyar, 1914)
- Cymbopteryx fuscimarginalis Munroe, 1961
- Cymbopteryx pseudobelialis Munroe, 1974
- Cymbopteryx unilinealis (Barnes & McDunnough, 1918)
