= Syntonarcha iriastis =

Scientific classification
- Kingdom: Animalia
- Phylum: Arthropoda
- Class: Insecta
- Order: Lepidoptera
- Family: Crambidae
- Genus: Syntonarcha
- Species: S. iriastis

Binomial name
- Syntonarcha iriastis Meyrick, 1890

Species of moth

Syntonarcha iriastis is a moth in the family Crambidae. It was described by Edward Meyrick in 1890. It is found in the western Pacific, including Hong Kong, New Caledonia and most of Australia, where it has been recorded from Western Australia, the Northern Territory, Queensland and New South Wales.

Males of the species produce an ultrasonic sound by rubbing their genitalia against one of their sternites. It is hypothesized that this is used to attract mates over long distances.

The wingspan is about 25 mm. The forewings are light brownish ochreous. The hindwings are whitish.
