= Turania (moth) =

Scientific classification
- Domain: Eukaryota
- Kingdom: Animalia
- Phylum: Arthropoda
- Class: Insecta
- Order: Lepidoptera
- Family: Crambidae
- Subfamily: Odontiinae
- Genus: Turania; Ragonot, 1891

Genus of moths

Turania is a genus of moths of the family Crambidae.

== Species ==
- Turania pentodontalis (Erschoff, 1874)
- Turania russulalis (Christoph, 1877)
