= Anatralata =

Scientific classification
- Domain: Eukaryota
- Kingdom: Animalia
- Phylum: Arthropoda
- Class: Insecta
- Order: Lepidoptera
- Family: Crambidae
- Subfamily: Odontiinae
- Tribe: Odontiini
- Genus: Anatralata; Munroe, 1961
- Species: A. versicolor

Binomial name
- Anatralata versicolor (Warren, 1892)

Synonyms
- Aporodes versicolor Warren, 1892

Genus of moths

Anatralata is a genus of moths of the family Crambidae. It contains only one species, Anatralata versicolor, which is found in North America, where it has been recorded from California to Idaho and British Columbia. The habitat consists of mountainous areas and low-elevation grasslands along the coast of central California.

The length of the forewings is 5–7 mm. Adults are on wing from March to July.

The larvae feed on Wyethia angustifolia.
