= Noordodes purpureoflava =

Scientific classification
- Kingdom: Animalia
- Phylum: Arthropoda
- Class: Insecta
- Order: Lepidoptera
- Family: Crambidae
- Genus: Noordodes
- Species: N. purpureoflava

Binomial name
- Noordodes purpureoflava Hampson, 1916

Species of moth

Noordodes purpureoflava is a moth in the family Crambidae. It was described by George Hampson in 1916. It is found on New Guinea.
