= Trigonoorda gavisalis =

Scientific classification
- Kingdom: Animalia
- Phylum: Arthropoda
- Class: Insecta
- Order: Lepidoptera
- Family: Crambidae
- Genus: Trigonoorda
- Species: T. gavisalis

Binomial name
- Trigonoorda gavisalis (Walker, 1869)

Synonyms
- Ebulea gavisalis Walker, 1869; Mecyna rhodochrysa Meyrick, 1885

Species of moth

Trigonoorda gavisalis is a moth in the family Crambidae. It was described by Francis Walker in 1869. It is found in Australia, where it has been recorded from New South Wales and Queensland.
