= Dausara pamirensis =

Scientific classification
- Domain: Eukaryota
- Kingdom: Animalia
- Phylum: Arthropoda
- Class: Insecta
- Order: Lepidoptera
- Family: Crambidae
- Genus: Dausara
- Species: D. pamirensis

Binomial name
- Dausara pamirensis Arora & Mandal, 1974

Species of moth

Dausara pamirensis is a moth in the family Crambidae. It was described by G.S. Arora and D.K. Mandal in 1974. It is found in India, where it has been recorded from Arunachal Pradesh.
