= Heliothelopsis =

Scientific classification
- Domain: Eukaryota
- Kingdom: Animalia
- Phylum: Arthropoda
- Class: Insecta
- Order: Lepidoptera
- Family: Crambidae
- Subfamily: Odontiinae
- Genus: Heliothelopsis; Munroe, 1961

Genus of moths

Heliothelopsis is a genus of moths of the family Crambidae.

== Species ==
- Heliothelopsis arbutalis (Snellen, 1875)
- Heliothelopsis costipunctalis (Barnes & McDunnough, 1914)
- Heliothelopsis unicoloralis (Barnes & McDunnough, 1914)
