= Cymbopteryx extralinea =

Scientific classification
- Kingdom: Animalia
- Phylum: Arthropoda
- Class: Insecta
- Order: Lepidoptera
- Family: Crambidae
- Genus: Cymbopteryx
- Species: C. extralinea

Binomial name
- Cymbopteryx extralinea (Dyar in Dyar, 1914)

Synonyms
- Edia extralinea Dyar in Dyar, 1914

Species of moth

Cymbopteryx extralinea is a moth in the family Crambidae. It was described by Harrison Gray Dyar Jr. in 1914. It is found in Puebla, Mexico.

Its wingspan is about 14 mm. The forewings are blackish-grey and the veins are finely lined and whitish. The outer line is also whitish. The hindwings are fuscous. Adults have been recorded on wing in September.
