= Hyalinarcha hyalinalis =

Scientific classification
- Kingdom: Animalia
- Phylum: Arthropoda
- Class: Insecta
- Order: Lepidoptera
- Family: Crambidae
- Genus: Hyalinarcha
- Species: H. hyalinalis

Binomial name
- Hyalinarcha hyalinalis (Hampson, 1896)

Synonyms
- Boeotarcha hyalinalis Hampson, 1896

Species of moth

Hyalinarcha hyalinalis is a moth in the family Crambidae. It was described by George Hampson in 1896. It is found in Bhutan and on the Andaman Islands.
