= Noctueliopsis virula =

Scientific classification
- Domain: Eukaryota
- Kingdom: Animalia
- Phylum: Arthropoda
- Class: Insecta
- Order: Lepidoptera
- Family: Crambidae
- Genus: Noctueliopsis
- Species: N. virula

Binomial name
- Noctueliopsis virula (Barnes & McDunnough, 1918)

Synonyms
- Noctuelia virula Barnes & McDunnough, 1918

Species of moth

Noctueliopsis virula is a moth in the family Crambidae. It was described by William Barnes and James Halliday McDunnough in 1918. It is found in North America, where it has been recorded from Arizona, California and Nevada.

The length of the forewings is 5–6 mm. The forewings are olivaceous brown with a slight ruddy tinge. There is a white shade at the base above the inner margin. The lines are black. The hindwings are pure white with faint brown terminal dots in males. The hindwings of the females have a brown terminal line. Adults are on wing from March to April and in June.
