= Glaucodontia =

Scientific classification
- Domain: Eukaryota
- Kingdom: Animalia
- Phylum: Arthropoda
- Class: Insecta
- Order: Lepidoptera
- Family: Crambidae
- Subfamily: Odontiinae
- Genus: Glaucodontia; Munroe, 1972
- Species: G. pyraustoides

Binomial name
- Glaucodontia pyraustoides Munroe, 1972

Genus of moths

Glaucodontia is a genus of moths of the family Crambidae. It contains only one species, Glaucodontia pyraustoides, which is found in North America, where it has been recorded from Utah, California and Nevada.
