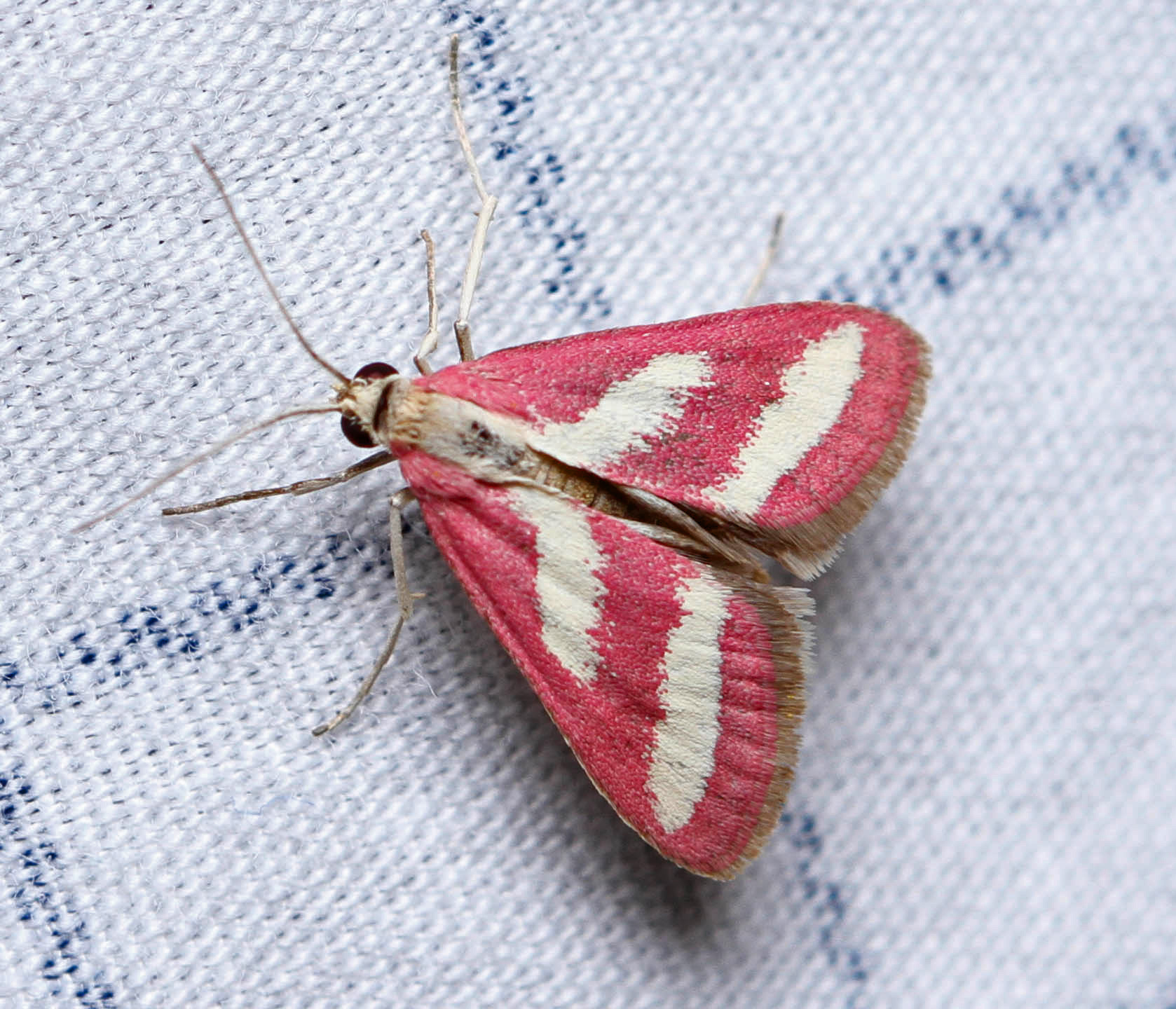

Scientific classification
- Kingdom: Animalia
- Phylum: Arthropoda
- Clade: Pancrustacea
- Class: Insecta
- Order: Lepidoptera
- Family: Crambidae
- Genus: Noctueliopsis
- Species: N. rhodoxanthinalis

Binomial name
- Noctueliopsis rhodoxanthinalis Munroe, 1974

= Noctueliopsis rhodoxanthinalis =

Species of moth

Noctueliopsis rhodoxanthinalis is a species of moth in the family Crambidae. It was first described by Eugene G. Munroe in 1974 and is found in North America, where it has been recorded from Texas.
