= Hydrorybina fulvescens =

Scientific classification
- Kingdom: Animalia
- Phylum: Arthropoda
- Clade: Pancrustacea
- Class: Insecta
- Order: Lepidoptera
- Family: Crambidae
- Genus: Hydrorybina
- Species: H. fulvescens

Binomial name
- Hydrorybina fulvescens Munroe, 1977

Species of moth

Hydrorybina fulvescens is a moth in the family Crambidae. It was described by Eugene G. Munroe in 1977. It is found in Indonesia, where it has been recorded from Sumatra.
