= Pogonogenys masoni =

Scientific classification
- Kingdom: Animalia
- Phylum: Arthropoda
- Class: Insecta
- Order: Lepidoptera
- Family: Crambidae
- Genus: Pogonogenys
- Species: P. masoni

Binomial name
- Pogonogenys masoni Munroe, 1961

Species of moth

Pogonogenys masoni is a moth in the family Crambidae. It was described by Eugene G. Munroe in 1961. It has been recorded in the United States of America in the state of California.
