= Boeotarcha cunealis =

Scientific classification
- Domain: Eukaryota
- Kingdom: Animalia
- Phylum: Arthropoda
- Class: Insecta
- Order: Lepidoptera
- Family: Crambidae
- Genus: Boeotarcha
- Species: B. cunealis

Binomial name
- Boeotarcha cunealis Warren, 1892

Species of moth

Boeotarcha cunealis is a moth in the family Crambidae. It was described by William Warren in 1892. It is found in Australia, where it has been recorded from the Northern Territory.

The wingspan is about 28 mm. The forewings are pinkish fuscous with a pale lemon-yellow central fascia, irregularly edged on both sides with purplish. The area before the hind margin is pale clear yellow, with a fine dark line from before the apex round the hind margin. The hindwings have a pale costa. The remainder of the wing is dark fuscous.
