= Canuza =

Scientific classification
- Domain: Eukaryota
- Kingdom: Animalia
- Phylum: Arthropoda
- Class: Insecta
- Order: Lepidoptera
- Family: Crambidae
- Subfamily: Odontiinae
- Genus: Canuza; Walker, 1866

Synonyms
- Erotomanes Meyrick, 1882

Genus of moths

Canuza is a genus of moths of the family Crambidae.

== Species ==
- Canuza acmias Meyrick, 1897
- Canuza euspilella Walker, 1866
