= Gyros atripennalis =

Scientific classification
- Domain: Eukaryota
- Kingdom: Animalia
- Phylum: Arthropoda
- Class: Insecta
- Order: Lepidoptera
- Family: Crambidae
- Genus: Gyros
- Species: G. atripennalis

Binomial name
- Gyros atripennalis Barnes & McDunnough, 1914

Species of moth

Gyros atripennalis is a moth in the family Crambidae. It was described by William Barnes and James Halliday McDunnough in 1914. It is found in North America, where it has been recorded in California.

The wingspan is about 13 mm. The forewings are blackish with a deep purplish-red tinge. The basal half of the wing is defined outwardly by a curved dark line just beyond which a black dash in the cell represents the reniform spot. There is a blackish line close to outer margin with which it is practically parallel. The space between these two lines is sprinkled with white scales. The hindwings are deep black. Adults have been recorded on wing in July.
