= Argyrarcha =

Scientific classification
- Domain: Eukaryota
- Kingdom: Animalia
- Phylum: Arthropoda
- Class: Insecta
- Order: Lepidoptera
- Family: Crambidae
- Tribe: Eurrhypini
- Genus: Argyrarcha; Munroe, 1974
- Species: A. margarita

Binomial name
- Argyrarcha margarita (Warren, 1892)

Synonyms
- Cirrhochrista margarita Warren, 1892; Boeotarcha margarita (Warren, 1892); Hyaloplaga ankarampotsyalis Viette, 1954; Argyrarcha ankarampotsyalis (Viette, 1954)

Genus of moths

Argyrarcha is a monotypic moth genus of the family Crambidae described by Eugene G. Munroe in 1974. Its only species, Argyrarcha margarita, described by William Warren in 1892, is found on Madagascar.
