= Noctueliopsis australis =

Scientific classification
- Kingdom: Animalia
- Phylum: Arthropoda
- Clade: Pancrustacea
- Class: Insecta
- Order: Lepidoptera
- Family: Crambidae
- Genus: Noctueliopsis
- Species: N. australis

Binomial name
- Noctueliopsis australis (Dognin, 1910)

Synonyms
- Noctuelia australis Dognin, 1910

Species of moth

Noctueliopsis australis is a moth in the family Crambidae. It was described by Paul Dognin in 1910. It is found in the Andes Mountains.

The wingspan is about 22 mm (0.87 in).
