= Mojavia =

Scientific classification
- Kingdom: Animalia
- Phylum: Arthropoda
- Class: Insecta
- Order: Lepidoptera
- Family: Crambidae
- Tribe: Odontiini
- Genus: Mojavia; Munroe, 1961
- Species: M. achemonalis

Binomial name
- Mojavia achemonalis (Barnes & McDunnough, 1914)

Synonyms
- Noctuelia achemonalis Barnes & McDunnough, 1914; Noctuelia achemonalis pulcharalis Barnes & Benjamin, 1924

Genus of moths

Mojavia is a monotypic moth genus of the family Crambidae erected by Eugene G. Munroe in 1961. It contains only one species, Mojavia achemonalis, which was first described by William Barnes and James Halliday McDunnough in 1914. It is found in North America, where it has been recorded from Arizona, California, Nevada, New Mexico and Texas.

The length of the forewings is 5–6 mm. The basal third of the forewings is deep pink, extending along the costa to near the apex. The remainder of the wing is olivaceous ocherous, bordered with pink along the outer margin. The hindwings are deep smoky. Adults are on wing in April and from June to September.
