= Kerbela monotona =

Scientific classification
- Domain: Eukaryota
- Kingdom: Animalia
- Phylum: Arthropoda
- Class: Insecta
- Order: Lepidoptera
- Family: Crambidae
- Genus: Kerbela
- Species: K. monotona

Binomial name
- Kerbela monotona Amsel, 1949

Species of moth

Kerbela monotona is a moth in the family Crambidae. It was described by Hans Georg Amsel in 1949. It is found in Iraq.
