= Deanolis iriocapna =

Scientific classification
- Kingdom: Animalia
- Phylum: Arthropoda
- Class: Insecta
- Order: Lepidoptera
- Family: Crambidae
- Genus: Deanolis
- Species: D. iriocapna

Binomial name
- Deanolis iriocapna (Meyrick, 1938)

Synonyms
- Sceliodes iriocapna Meyrick, 1938

Species of moth

Deanolis iriocapna is a species of moth in the family Crambidae. It was described by Edward Meyrick in 1938 and is found on the island of Java.

The forewings are pale yellow, with a yellowish costa, a dark spot in both outer edges of the cell, and a reddish undulating margin along the termen. The hindwings are of the same pale yellow ground colour, and the anterior half of the termen exhibits a similar margin as found in the forewings.
