= Edia semiluna =

Scientific classification
- Domain: Eukaryota
- Kingdom: Animalia
- Phylum: Arthropoda
- Class: Insecta
- Order: Lepidoptera
- Family: Crambidae
- Genus: Edia
- Species: E. semiluna

Binomial name
- Edia semiluna (Smith, 1905)

Synonyms
- Lythrodes semiluna Smith, 1905; Cynaeda bidentalis Barnes & McDunnough, 1912; Edia microstagma Dyar, 1913

Species of moth

Edia semiluna is a species of moth in the family Crambidae. It was first described by John Bernhardt Smith in 1905. The species is found in southern Arizona and Mexico.

The length of the forewings is 8–10 mm. The ground colour of the forewings is white with a faint olivaceous tinge. The basal area is olivaceous brown from the costa to the inner margin. The hindwings are white, with a smoky margin. Adults have been recorded on wing in May, August and October.
