= Hydrorybina pryeri =

Scientific classification
- Domain: Eukaryota
- Kingdom: Animalia
- Phylum: Arthropoda
- Class: Insecta
- Order: Lepidoptera
- Family: Crambidae
- Genus: Hydrorybina
- Species: H. pryeri

Binomial name
- Hydrorybina pryeri (Butler, 1881)

Synonyms
- Anemosa pryeri Butler, 1881; Clupeosoma pryeri

Species of moth

Hydrorybina pryeri is a moth in the family Crambidae. It was described by Arthur Gardiner Butler in 1881. It is found in Japan and Russia.

The wingspan is 14–19 mm. Adults are pale bronze brown, washed with grey. The wings are crossed by an arched discal black line. The center of costal border, the area between the cell and the discal line of the forewings are rust red. There is a blackish arched line across the basal third and a small blackish disco-cellular lunule. The hindwings are sordid white, with an arched slender dusky discal line.
