= Heliothelopsis unicoloralis =

Scientific classification
- Domain: Eukaryota
- Kingdom: Animalia
- Phylum: Arthropoda
- Class: Insecta
- Order: Lepidoptera
- Family: Crambidae
- Genus: Heliothelopsis
- Species: H. unicoloralis

Binomial name
- Heliothelopsis unicoloralis (Barnes & McDunnough, 1914)

Synonyms
- Heliothela unicoloralis Barnes & McDunnough, 1914

Species of moth

Heliothelopsis unicoloralis is a moth in the family Crambidae. It was described by William Barnes and James Halliday McDunnough in 1914. It is found in North America, where it has been recorded from Arizona.

The wingspan is 12–14 mm. The forewings are deep black brown with a slight bronze tinge and sprinkled with whitish scaling. The hindwings are uniform black brown. Adults have been recorded on wing in August.
