= Chlorobaptella =

Scientific classification
- Domain: Eukaryota
- Kingdom: Animalia
- Phylum: Arthropoda
- Class: Insecta
- Order: Lepidoptera
- Family: Crambidae
- Subfamily: Odontiinae
- Tribe: Odontiini
- Genus: Chlorobaptella; Munroe, 1995
- Species: C. rufistrigalis

Binomial name
- Chlorobaptella rufistrigalis (Barnes & McDunnough, 1914)

Synonyms
- Chlorobapta Barnes & McDunnough, 1914 (preocc.); Chlorobapta rufistrigalis Barnes & McDunnough, 1914

Genus of moths

Chlorobaptella is a monotypic moth genus of the family Crambidae erected by Eugene G. Munroe in 1995. Its only species, Chlorobaptella rufistrigalis, was first described by William Barnes and James Halliday McDunnough in 1914. It is found in North America, where it has been recorded from California and Nevada. Moths in this genus are distinguished from moths in similar genera by their small palpi and obsolete tongues.
