= Thesaurica =

Scientific classification
- Domain: Eukaryota
- Kingdom: Animalia
- Phylum: Arthropoda
- Class: Insecta
- Order: Lepidoptera
- Family: Crambidae
- Subfamily: Odontiinae
- Genus: Thesaurica; Turner, 1915

Genus of moths

Thesaurica is a genus of moths of the family Crambidae.

== Species ==
- Thesaurica accensalis (Swinhoe, 1903)
- Thesaurica argentifera (Hampson, 1913)
- Thesaurica notodontalis (Hampson, 1899)
