= Trigonoorda triangularis =

Scientific classification
- Domain: Eukaryota
- Kingdom: Animalia
- Phylum: Arthropoda
- Class: Insecta
- Order: Lepidoptera
- Family: Crambidae
- Genus: Trigonoorda
- Species: T. triangularis

Binomial name
- Trigonoorda triangularis Munroe, 1974

Species of moth

Trigonoorda triangularis is a moth in the family Crambidae. It was described by Eugene G. Munroe in 1974. It is found on New Guinea.
