= Mojaviodes =

Scientific classification
- Kingdom: Animalia
- Phylum: Arthropoda
- Class: Insecta
- Order: Lepidoptera
- Family: Crambidae
- Tribe: Odontiini
- Genus: Mojaviodes; Munroe, 1972
- Species: M. blanchardae

Binomial name
- Mojaviodes blanchardae Munroe, 1972

Genus of moths

Mojaviodes is a genus of moths in the family Crambidae. It contains only one species, Mojaviodes blanchardae, which is found in the south-western United States, where it has been recorded from Texas.

The wingspan is about 16 mm.
