= Odontivalvia =

Scientific classification
- Domain: Eukaryota
- Kingdom: Animalia
- Phylum: Arthropoda
- Class: Insecta
- Order: Lepidoptera
- Family: Crambidae
- Subfamily: Odontiinae
- Genus: Odontivalvia; Munroe, 1973
- Species: O. radialis

Binomial name
- Odontivalvia radialis (Munroe, 1972)

Synonyms
- Noctueliopsis radialis Munroe, 1972

Genus of moths

Odontivalvia is a genus of moths of the family Crambidae. It contains only one species, Odontivalvia radialis, which is found in North America, where it has been recorded from Texas.

Larvae have been recorded feeding on Leucophyllum minus. They create silken tunnels covered with frass, attached to the branches of the host plant.
