= Balaenifrons ochrochroa =

Scientific classification
- Kingdom: Animalia
- Phylum: Arthropoda
- Class: Insecta
- Order: Lepidoptera
- Family: Crambidae
- Genus: Balaenifrons
- Species: B. ochrochroa

Binomial name
- Balaenifrons ochrochroa Hampson, 1917

Species of moth

Balaenifrons ochrochroa is a moth in the family Crambidae. It was described by George Hampson in 1917. It is found in Singapore.

The wingspan is about 28 mm. The forewings are ochreous, irrorated (sprinkled) with brick red and a diffuse red antemedial line, as well as a fine dark terminal line. The hindwings are ochreous whitish, suffused with brown.
