= Boeotarcha albotermina =

Scientific classification
- Kingdom: Animalia
- Phylum: Arthropoda
- Class: Insecta
- Order: Lepidoptera
- Family: Crambidae
- Genus: Boeotarcha
- Species: B. albotermina

Binomial name
- Boeotarcha albotermina Hampson, 1913

Species of moth

Boeotarcha albotermina is a moth in the family Crambidae. It was described by George Hampson in 1913. It is found in Indonesia, where it has been recorded from Irian Jaya.
