= Suinoorda =

Scientific classification
- Kingdom: Animalia
- Phylum: Arthropoda
- Class: Insecta
- Order: Lepidoptera
- Family: Crambidae
- Subfamily: Odontiinae
- Genus: Suinoorda; Hayden, 2009
- Species: S. maccabei

Binomial name
- Suinoorda maccabei Hayden, 2009

Genus of moths

Suinoorda is a genus of moths of the family Crambidae. It contains only one species, Suinoorda maccabei, which is found on the Bahamas.
