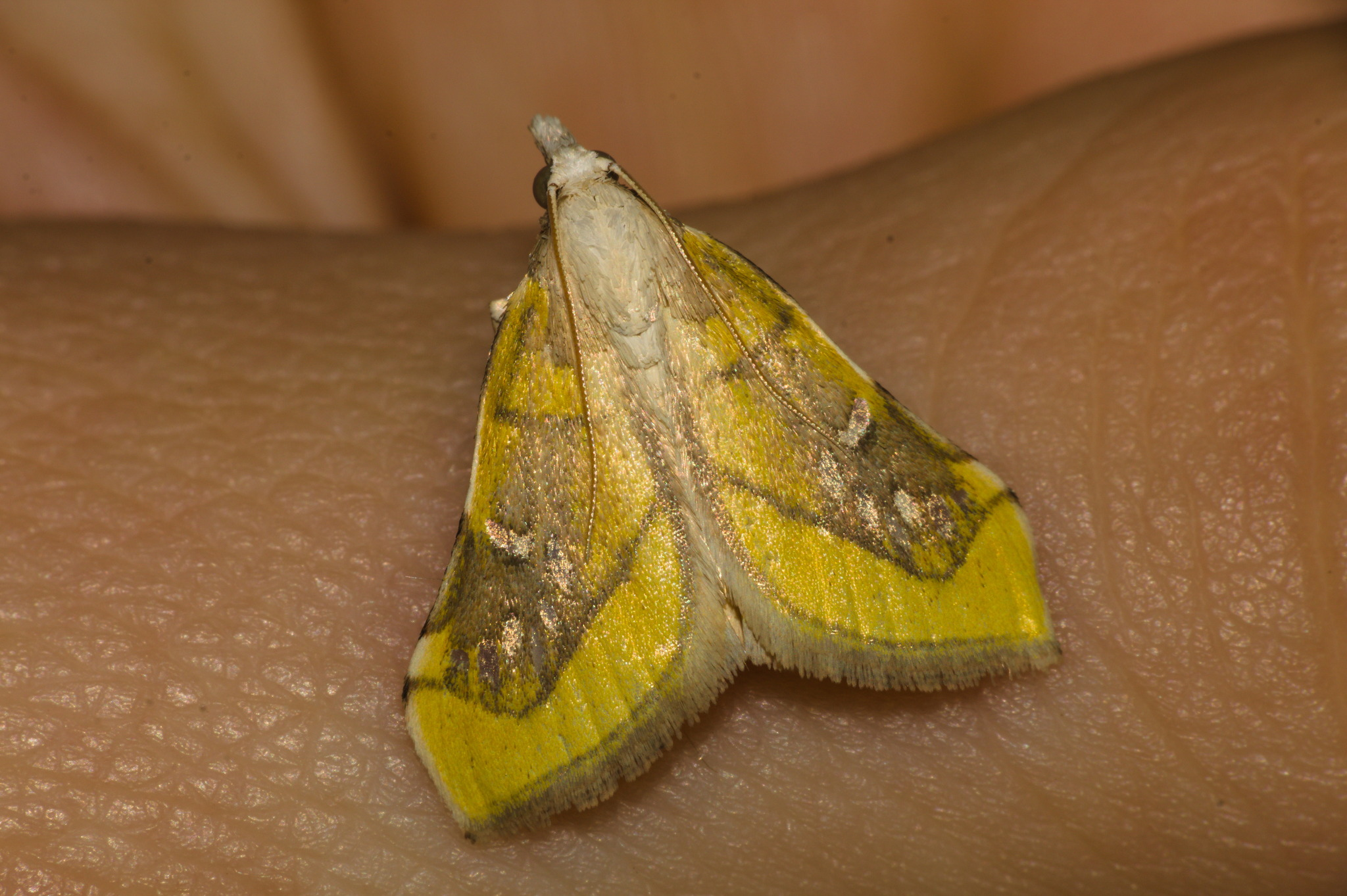
- Boeotarcha coemaroalis

Scientific classification
- Domain: Eukaryota
- Kingdom: Animalia
- Phylum: Arthropoda
- Class: Insecta
- Order: Lepidoptera
- Family: Crambidae
- Subfamily: Odontiinae
- Genus: Boeotarcha; Meyrick, 1884

= Boeotarcha =

Genus of moths

Boeotarcha is a genus of moths of the family Crambidae.

== Species ==
- Boeotarcha albotermina Hampson, 1913
- Boeotarcha caeruleotincta Hampson, 1918
- Boeotarcha cunealis Warren, 1892
- Boeotarcha divisa (T. P. Lucas, 1894)
- Boeotarcha martinalis (Walker, 1859)
- Boeotarcha taenialis (Snellen, 1880)
