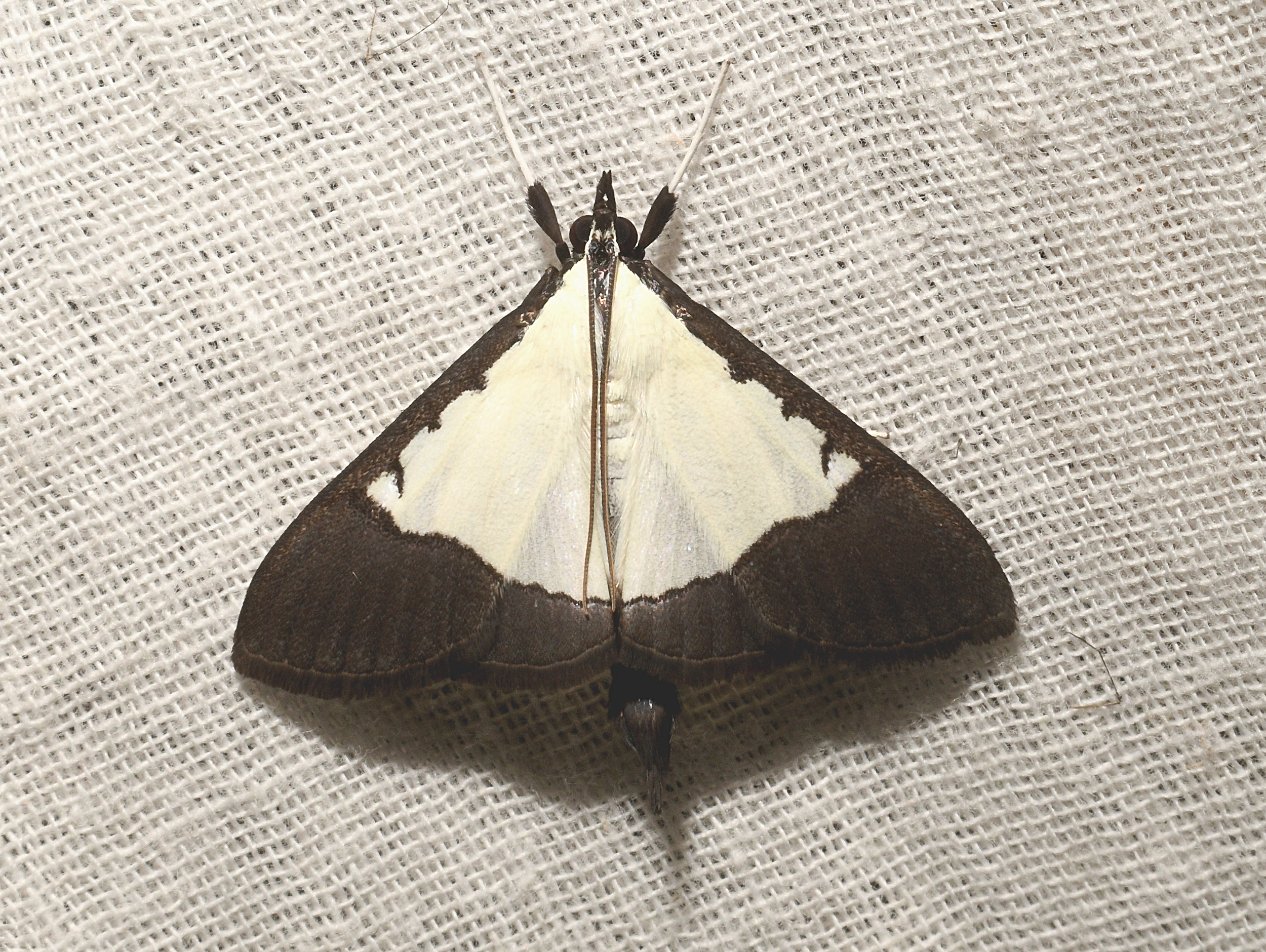
- Dorsal view

Scientific classification
- Kingdom: Animalia
- Phylum: Arthropoda
- Clade: Pancrustacea
- Class: Insecta
- Order: Lepidoptera
- Family: Crambidae
- Genus: Pitama
- Species: P. lativitta

Binomial name
- Pitama lativitta Moore, 1888

= Pitama lativitta =

Species of moth

Pitama lativitta is a moth in the family Crambidae. It was described by Frederic Moore in 1888. It is found in Darjeeling, India.
