= Dausara =

Scientific classification
- Domain: Eukaryota
- Kingdom: Animalia
- Phylum: Arthropoda
- Class: Insecta
- Order: Lepidoptera
- Family: Crambidae
- Subfamily: Odontiinae
- Genus: Dausara; Walker, 1859

Genus of moths

Dausara is a genus of moths of the family Crambidae.

== Species ==
- Dausara chiangmai Yoshiyasu, 1995
- Dausara latiterminalis Yoshiyasu, 1995
- Dausara marginalis (Moore, 1877)
- Dausara orionalis (Walker, 1859)
- Dausara pamirensis Arora & Mandal, 1974
- Dausara talliusalis Walker, 1859
