= Cymbopteryx fuscimarginalis =

Scientific classification
- Domain: Eukaryota
- Kingdom: Animalia
- Phylum: Arthropoda
- Class: Insecta
- Order: Lepidoptera
- Family: Crambidae
- Genus: Cymbopteryx
- Species: C. fuscimarginalis

Binomial name
- Cymbopteryx fuscimarginalis Munroe, 1961

Species of moth

Cymbopteryx fuscimarginalis is a moth in the family Crambidae. It was described by Eugene G. Munroe in 1961. It is found in North America, where it has been recorded from Arizona.
