= Neocymbopteryx =

Scientific classification
- Kingdom: Animalia
- Phylum: Arthropoda
- Clade: Pancrustacea
- Class: Insecta
- Order: Lepidoptera
- Family: Crambidae
- Subfamily: Odontiinae
- Genus: Neocymbopteryx; Munroe, 1973
- Species: N. heitzmani

Binomial name
- Neocymbopteryx heitzmani Munroe, 1973

Genus of moths

Neocymbopteryx is a genus of moths of the family Crambidae. It contains only one species, Neocymbopteryx heitzmani, which is found in North America, where it has been recorded from Arkansas.
