= Syntonarcha =

Scientific classification
- Kingdom: Animalia
- Phylum: Arthropoda
- Clade: Pancrustacea
- Class: Insecta
- Order: Lepidoptera
- Family: Crambidae
- Subfamily: Odontiinae
- Genus: Syntonarcha; Meyrick, 1890

Genus of moths

Syntonarcha is a genus of moths of the family Crambidae.

== Species ==
- Syntonarcha iriastis Meyrick, 1890
- Syntonarcha vulnerata T. P. Lucas, 1894
