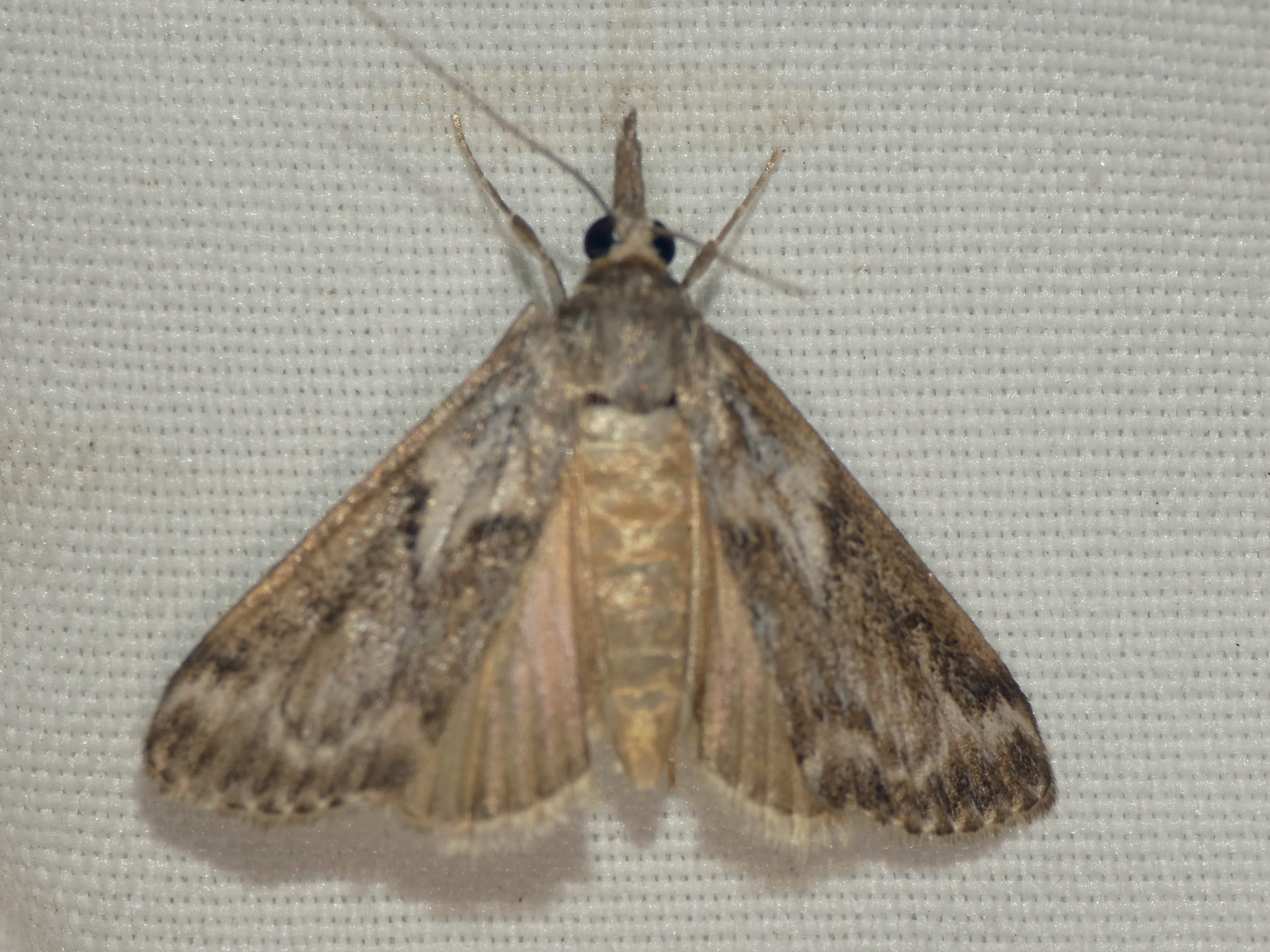

Scientific classification
- Kingdom: Animalia
- Phylum: Arthropoda
- Clade: Pancrustacea
- Class: Insecta
- Order: Lepidoptera
- Family: Crambidae
- Genus: Trigonoorda
- Species: T. psarochroa

Binomial name
- Trigonoorda psarochroa (Turner, 1908)

Synonyms
- Noorda psarochroa Turner, 1908

= Trigonoorda psarochroa =

Species of moth

Trigonoorda psarochroa is a species of moth in the family Crambidae. It was first described by Turner in 1908. It is found in Australia, where it has been recorded from Queensland.

The wingspan is about 27 mm. Adults have been recorded on wing in March.
