= Protrigonia =

Scientific classification
- Domain: Eukaryota
- Kingdom: Animalia
- Phylum: Arthropoda
- Class: Insecta
- Order: Lepidoptera
- Family: Crambidae
- Subfamily: Odontiinae
- Genus: Protrigonia; Hampson, 1896
- Species: P. zizanialis

Binomial name
- Protrigonia zizanialis (C. Swinhoe, 1886)

Synonyms
- Pyralis zizanialis C. Swinhoe, 1886

Genus of moths

Protrigonia is a monotypic moth genus of the family Crambidae erected by George Hampson in 1896. It contains only one species, Protrigonia zizanialis, described by Charles Swinhoe in 1886, which is found in Sri Lanka and western India.

The forewings are pinkish white, suffused with brown. The costal line is brown with a brown ringlet. The submarginal band is also brown. The hindwings are white, but grey towards the outer border.
