= Aeglotis =

Scientific classification
- Kingdom: Animalia
- Phylum: Arthropoda
- Clade: Pancrustacea
- Class: Insecta
- Order: Lepidoptera
- Family: Crambidae
- Subfamily: Odontiinae
- Genus: Aeglotis; Amsel, 1949
- Species: A. argentalis

Binomial name
- Aeglotis argentalis (Christoph, 1887)

Synonyms
- Anaeglis argentalis Christoph, 1887

Genus of moths

Aeglotis is a genus of moths of the family Crambidae. It contains only one species, Aeglotis argentalis, which is found in Pakistan.
