= Heliothelopsis costipunctalis =

Scientific classification
- Domain: Eukaryota
- Kingdom: Animalia
- Phylum: Arthropoda
- Class: Insecta
- Order: Lepidoptera
- Family: Crambidae
- Genus: Heliothelopsis
- Species: H. costipunctalis

Binomial name
- Heliothelopsis costipunctalis (Barnes & McDunnough, 1914)

Synonyms
- Heliothela costipunctalis Barnes & McDunnough, 1914; Pycnarmon breiralis Schaus, 1920

Species of moth

Heliothelopsis costipunctalis is a moth in the family Crambidae. It was described by William Barnes and James Halliday McDunnough in 1914. It is found in Mexico and the US states of Texas and Arizona.

The wingspan is about 16 mm. The forewings are deep black brown sprinkled with whitish scales and with a small whitish patch on the costa. The hindwings are uniform black brown. Adults have been recorded on wing in August.
