= Noctueliopsis brunnealis =

Scientific classification
- Domain: Eukaryota
- Kingdom: Animalia
- Phylum: Arthropoda
- Class: Insecta
- Order: Lepidoptera
- Family: Crambidae
- Genus: Noctueliopsis
- Species: N. brunnealis

Binomial name
- Noctueliopsis brunnealis Munroe, 1972

Species of moth

Noctueliopsis brunnealis is a moth in the family Crambidae. It was described by Eugene G. Munroe in 1972. It is found in North America, where it has been recorded from Arizona, California, Nevada, New Mexico and Texas.

Adults have been recorded on wing from March to May and from July to September.
