= Gyros (moth) =

Scientific classification
- Domain: Eukaryota
- Kingdom: Animalia
- Phylum: Arthropoda
- Class: Insecta
- Order: Lepidoptera
- Family: Crambidae
- Subfamily: Odontiinae
- Genus: Gyros; H. Edwards, 1881

Synonyms
- Monocona Warren, 1892; Oribates H. Edwards, 1881

Genus of moths

Gyros is a genus of moths of the family Crambidae.

== Species ==
- Gyros atripennalis Barnes & McDunnough, 1914
- Gyros muirii (H. Edwards, 1881)
- Gyros powelli Munroe, 1959
