= Dilacinia =

Scientific classification
- Domain: Eukaryota
- Kingdom: Animalia
- Phylum: Arthropoda
- Class: Insecta
- Order: Lepidoptera
- Family: Crambidae
- Subfamily: Odontiinae
- Genus: Dilacinia; Amsel, 1961
- Species: D. badialis

Binomial name
- Dilacinia badialis Amsel, 1961

Synonyms
- Dilacina Amsel, 1961

Genus of moths

Dilacinia is a genus of moths of the family Crambidae. It contains only one species, Dilacinia badialis, which was described from Persia.
