= Balaenifrons homopteridia =

Scientific classification
- Kingdom: Animalia
- Phylum: Arthropoda
- Class: Insecta
- Order: Lepidoptera
- Family: Crambidae
- Genus: Balaenifrons
- Species: B. homopteridia

Binomial name
- Balaenifrons homopteridia Hampson, 1896

Species of moth

Balaenifrons homopteridia is a moth in the family Crambidae. It was described by George Hampson in 1896. It is found in Myanmar, Bengal (in what was British India) and northern Borneo.

The wingspan is about 20 mm. The forewings are purplish red, irrorated (sprinkled) with ochreous. The hindwings are yellowish brown.
