= Pogonogenys =

Scientific classification
- Kingdom: Animalia
- Phylum: Arthropoda
- Class: Insecta
- Order: Lepidoptera
- Family: Crambidae
- Tribe: Odontiini
- Genus: Pogonogenys; Munroe, 1961

Genus of moths

Pogonogenys is a genus of moths of the family Crambidae.

== Species ==
- Pogonogenys frechini Munroe, 1961
- Pogonogenys masoni Munroe, 1961
- Pogonogenys proximalis (Fernald, 1894)
