= Psammobotys =

Scientific classification
- Domain: Eukaryota
- Kingdom: Animalia
- Phylum: Arthropoda
- Class: Insecta
- Order: Lepidoptera
- Family: Crambidae
- Subfamily: Odontiinae
- Genus: Psammobotys; Munroe, 1961

Genus of moths

Psammobotys is a genus of moths of the family Crambidae.

== Species ==
- Psammobotys alpinalis Munroe, 1972
- Psammobotys fordi Munroe, 1961
