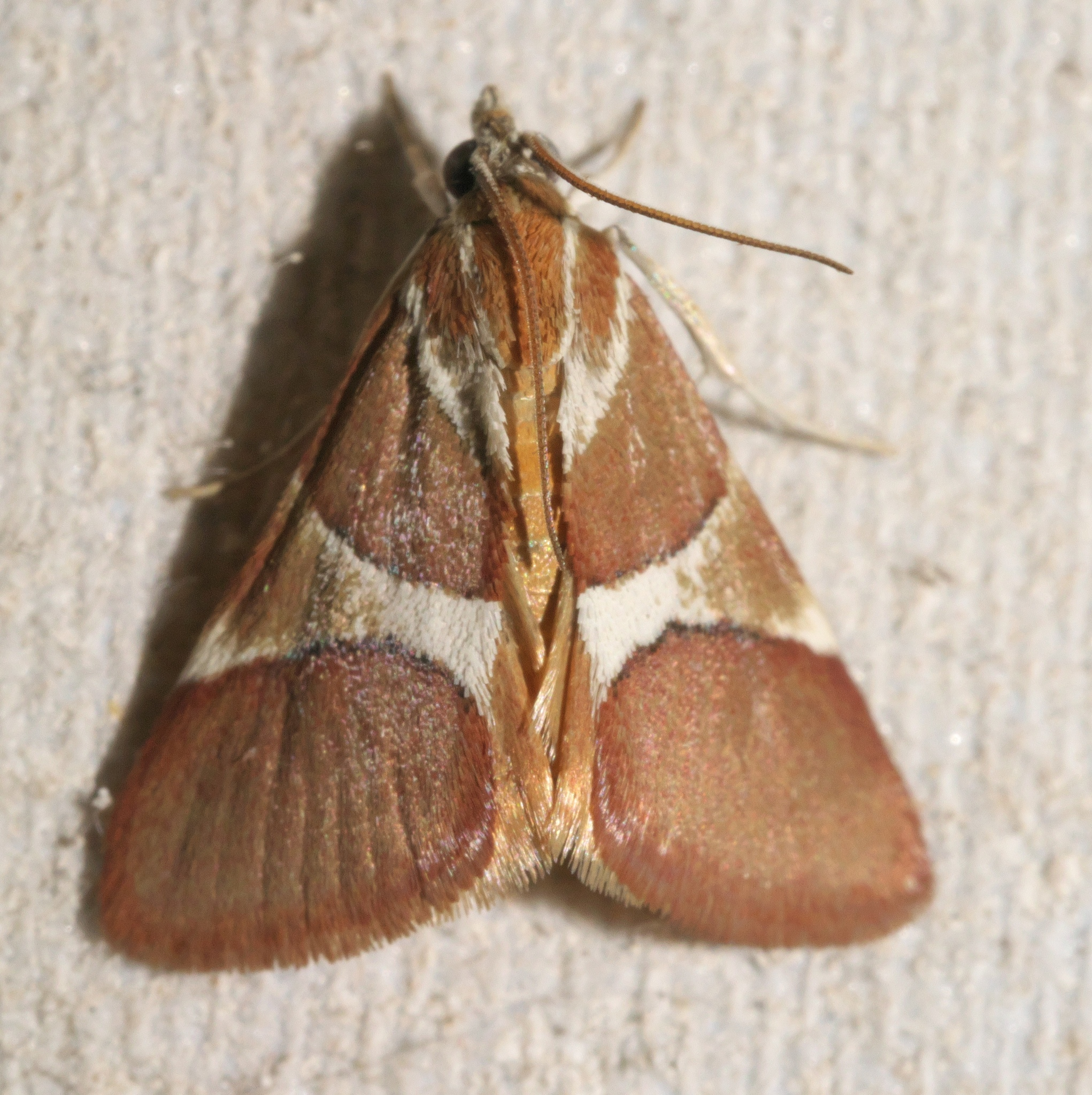
- Jativa castanealis, Arizona

Scientific classification
- Kingdom: Animalia
- Phylum: Arthropoda
- Class: Insecta
- Order: Lepidoptera
- Family: Crambidae
- Tribe: Eurrhypini
- Genus: Jativa; Munroe, 1961
- Species: J. castanealis

Binomial name
- Jativa castanealis (Hulst, 1886)

Synonyms
- Orobena castanealis Hulst, 1886; Thalpochares jativa Barnes, 1905

= Jativa castanealis =

Genus of moths

Jativa castanealis is a species of moth of the family Crambidae. It is the only species in its genus, which is found in North America, where it has been recorded from Arizona, New Mexico and Texas.

Adults have been recorded on wing from April to May and from July to October.
