= Edia =

Scientific classification
- Domain: Eukaryota
- Kingdom: Animalia
- Phylum: Arthropoda
- Class: Insecta
- Order: Lepidoptera
- Family: Crambidae
- Genus: Edia; Dyar, 1913

Genus of moths

Edia is a genus of moths of the family Crambidae.

== Species ==
- Edia minutissima Smith, 1906
- Edia semiluna Smith, 1905
