= List of crambid genera: U =

The large moth family Crambidae contains the following genera beginning with "U":

- Ubida
- Udea
- Udonomeiga
- Uinta
- Uliocome
- Ulopeza
- Uncobotyodes
- Undulambia
- Upiga
- Uresiphita
- Urola
- Usgentia
- Usingeriessa
- Uthinia
