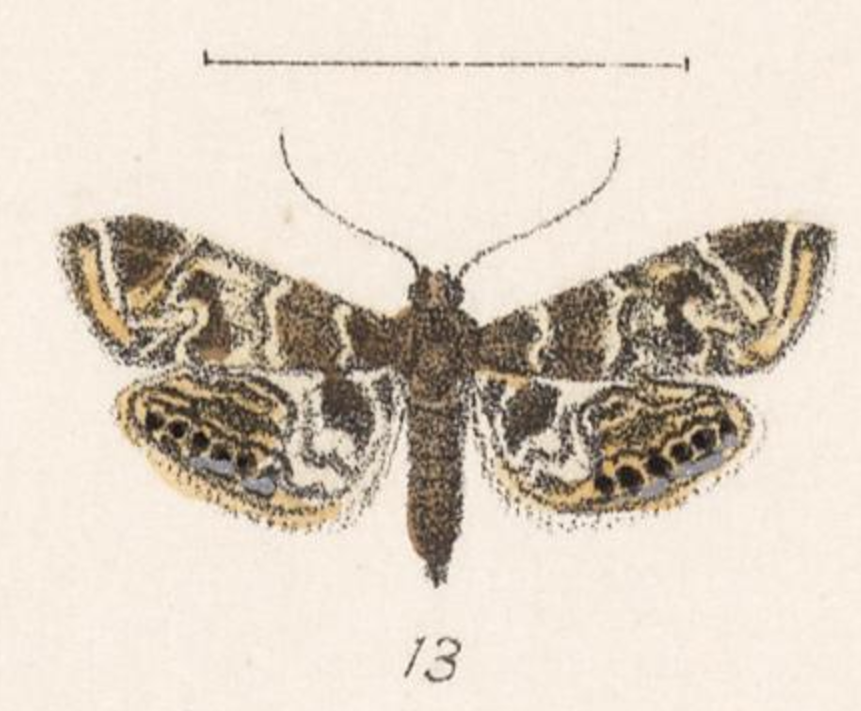

Scientific classification
- Kingdom: Animalia
- Phylum: Arthropoda
- Class: Insecta
- Order: Lepidoptera
- Family: Crambidae
- Genus: Usingeriessa
- Species: U. onyxalis

Binomial name
- Usingeriessa onyxalis (Hampson, 1897)

Synonyms
- Cataclysta divulsalis Druce, 1896 not Walker, 1866; Cataclysta onyxalis Hampson, 1897; Elophila cancellalis Dyar, 1917; Usingeriessa cancellalis (Dyar, 1917); Usingeriessa divulsalis

= Usingeriessa onyxalis =

Species of moth

Usingeriessa onyxalis is a species of moth of the family Crambidae. It is native to southern Texas, Mexico and Central America. It is an introduced species in Hawaii.

The larvae are thought to be aquatic.
