= Musotiminae =

Scientific classification
- Domain: Eukaryota
- Kingdom: Animalia
- Phylum: Arthropoda
- Class: Insecta
- Order: Lepidoptera
- Family: Crambidae
- Subfamily: Musotiminae; Meyrick, 1884

Synonyms
- Ambiini Munroe, 1972

Subfamily of moths

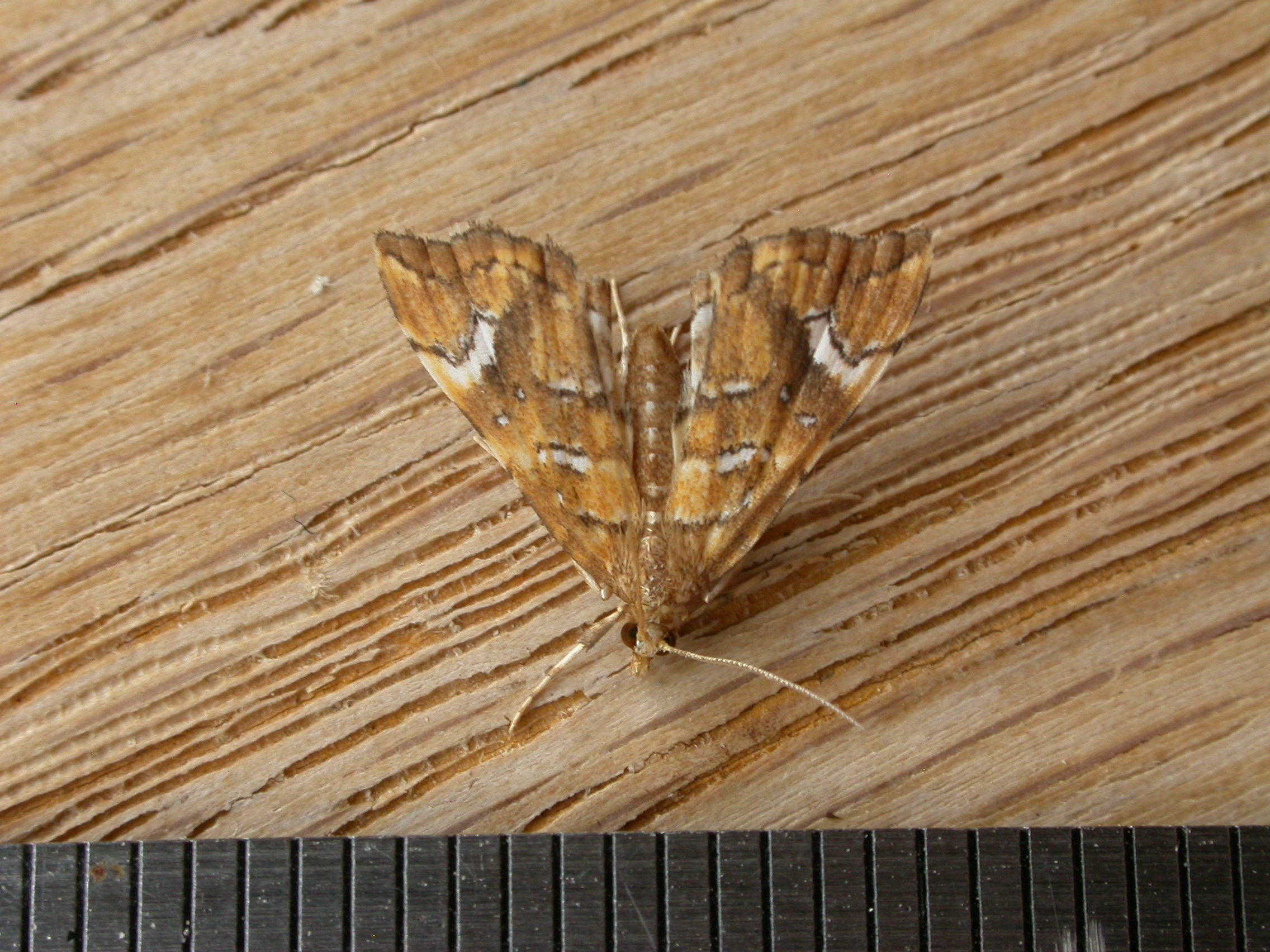

Musotiminae is a subfamily of the lepidopteran family Crambidae. It was described by Edward Meyrick in 1884

== Genera ==
- Aeolopetra Meyrick, 1934
- Albusambia Solis & Davis in Solis, Davis & Nishida, 2005
- Ambia Walker, 1859 (= Metathyrida Viette, 1954, Metathyridia Whalley, 1964)
- Austromusotima Yen & Solis in Yen, Solis & Goolsby, 2004
- Baeoptila Turner, 1908
- Barisoa Möschler, 1886
- Cilaus de Joannis, 1932
- Drosophantis Meyrick, 1935
- Elachypteryx Turner, 1908
- Eugauria Meyrick, 1884
- Lygomusotima Solis & Yen in Solis, Yen & Goolsby, 2004
- Malleria Munroe, 1959
- Midilambia Munroe, 1969
- Musotima Meyrick, 1884 (= Musotina Caradja, 1927)
- Neomusotima Yoshiyasu, 1985
- Neurophyseta Hampson, 1895 (= Cymoriza Guenée, 1854, Cymorrhiza E. Hering, 1903, Neurophysetis Hampson, 1895, Omphaloptera Hampson, 1897)
- Odilla Schaus, 1940
- Panotima Meyrick, 1934
- Parthenodes Guenée, 1854
- Siamusotima Solis, Yen, Goolsby, Wright, Pemberton, Winotal, Chattrukul, Thagong & Rimbut, 2005
- Thysanoidma Hampson, 1891
- Undulambia Lange, 1956 (= Ambia albitesselalis Hampson, 1906)
- Uthinia Snellen, 1899
- Yoshiyasua Kemal & Kocak, 2005 (= Melanochroa Yoshiyasu, 1985)
