= Elophila melagynalis =

Scientific classification
- Domain: Eukaryota
- Kingdom: Animalia
- Phylum: Arthropoda
- Class: Insecta
- Order: Lepidoptera
- Family: Crambidae
- Genus: Elophila
- Species: E. melagynalis

Binomial name
- Elophila melagynalis (Agassiz, 1978)

Synonyms
- Nymphula melagynalis Agassiz, 1978

Species of moth

Elophila melagynalis is a species of moth of the family Crambidae. It was described by David John Lawrence Agassiz in 1978 from a specimen that was found in greenhouses of aquaristic plants in the United Kingdom but its exact origin was unknown. The author suggested the Far East. The presence of this moths has also been stated in Réunion, Japan (the Ryukyus), Sri Lanka and Thailand.

Records from Fujian province in China proved to be an misidentification of Thysanoidma octalis.

The wingspan is 9–11 mm for males and 11–13 mm for females. The inner half of the forewings is dark fuscous and the outer half is white. The hindwings are white.
