= Lygomusotima stria =

Scientific classification
- Kingdom: Animalia
- Phylum: Arthropoda
- Clade: Pancrustacea
- Class: Insecta
- Order: Lepidoptera
- Family: Crambidae
- Genus: Lygomusotima
- Species: L. stria

Binomial name
- Lygomusotima stria Solis & Yen in Solis, Yen & Goolsby, 2004

Species of moth

Lygomusotima stria is a moth in the family Crambidae. It was described by Maria Alma Solis and Shen-Horn Yen in 2004. It is found from Singapore and Thailand to Pulo Laut (an island near Borneo).

The length of the forewings is 5–7.1 mm

The larvae feed on Lygodium microphyllum.
