= Usingeriessa sinitalis =

Scientific classification
- Kingdom: Animalia
- Phylum: Arthropoda
- Class: Insecta
- Order: Lepidoptera
- Family: Crambidae
- Genus: Usingeriessa
- Species: U. sinitalis

Binomial name
- Usingeriessa sinitalis (Schaus, 1906)

Synonyms
- Argyractis sinitalis Schaus, 1906; Petrophila sinitalis

Species of moth

Usingeriessa sinitalis is a species of moth in the family Crambidae. It was described by Schaus in 1906. It is found in Mexico.
