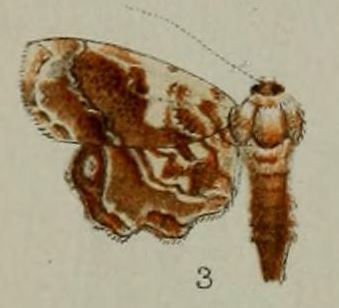

Scientific classification
- Kingdom: Animalia
- Phylum: Arthropoda
- Clade: Pancrustacea
- Class: Insecta
- Order: Lepidoptera
- Family: Crambidae
- Genus: Aeolopetra
- Species: A. phoenicobapta

Binomial name
- Aeolopetra phoenicobapta (Hampson, 1898)

Synonyms
- Massepha phoenicobapta Hampson, 1898

= Aeolopetra phoenicobapta =

Species of moth

Aeolopetra phoenicobapta is a moth in the family Crambidae. It was described by George Hampson in 1898. It is found in New Guinea, where it has been recorded from Fergusson Island.
