= Chrysendeton chalcitis =

Scientific classification
- Kingdom: Animalia
- Phylum: Arthropoda
- Class: Insecta
- Order: Lepidoptera
- Family: Crambidae
- Genus: Chrysendeton
- Species: C. chalcitis

Binomial name
- Chrysendeton chalcitis (C. Felder, R. Felder & Rogenhofer, 1875)

Synonyms
- Cataclysta chalcitis C. Felder, R. Felder & Rogenhofer, 1875

Species of moth

Chrysendeton chalcitis is a species of moth in the family Crambidae. It was described by Cajetan von Felder, Rudolf Felder and Alois Friedrich Rogenhofer in 1875. It is found in Colombia.
