= Elachypteryx callidryas =

Scientific classification
- Domain: Eukaryota
- Kingdom: Animalia
- Phylum: Arthropoda
- Class: Insecta
- Order: Lepidoptera
- Family: Crambidae
- Genus: Elachypteryx
- Species: E. callidryas

Binomial name
- Elachypteryx callidryas (Turner, 1922)

Synonyms
- Musotima callidryas Turner, 1922

Species of moth

Elachypteryx callidryas is a moth in the family Crambidae. It was described by Turner in 1922. It is found in Australia.
