= Usingeriessa tamanalis =

Scientific classification
- Kingdom: Animalia
- Phylum: Arthropoda
- Class: Insecta
- Order: Lepidoptera
- Family: Crambidae
- Genus: Usingeriessa
- Species: U. tamanalis

Binomial name
- Usingeriessa tamanalis (Schaus, 1924)

Synonyms
- Argyractis tamanalis Schaus, 1924

Species of moth

Usingeriessa tamanalis is a species of moth in the family Crambidae. It was described by William Schaus in 1924. It is found in Colombia.
