= Baeoptila oculalis =

Scientific classification
- Kingdom: Animalia
- Phylum: Arthropoda
- Class: Insecta
- Order: Lepidoptera
- Family: Crambidae
- Genus: Baeoptila
- Species: B. oculalis

Binomial name
- Baeoptila oculalis (Hampson, 1897)

Synonyms
- Ambia oculalis Hampson, 1897; Musotima stictochroa Turner, 1915

Species of moth

Baeoptila oculalis is a moth in the family Crambidae. It was described by George Hampson in 1897. It is found in Australia.
