= Usingeriessa decoralis =

Scientific classification
- Kingdom: Animalia
- Phylum: Arthropoda
- Class: Insecta
- Order: Lepidoptera
- Family: Crambidae
- Genus: Usingeriessa
- Species: U. decoralis

Binomial name
- Usingeriessa decoralis (Dognin, 1905)

Synonyms
- Argyractis decoralis Dognin, 1905

Species of moth

Usingeriessa decoralis is a species of moth in the family Crambidae. It was described by Paul Dognin in 1905. It is found in Ecuador.
