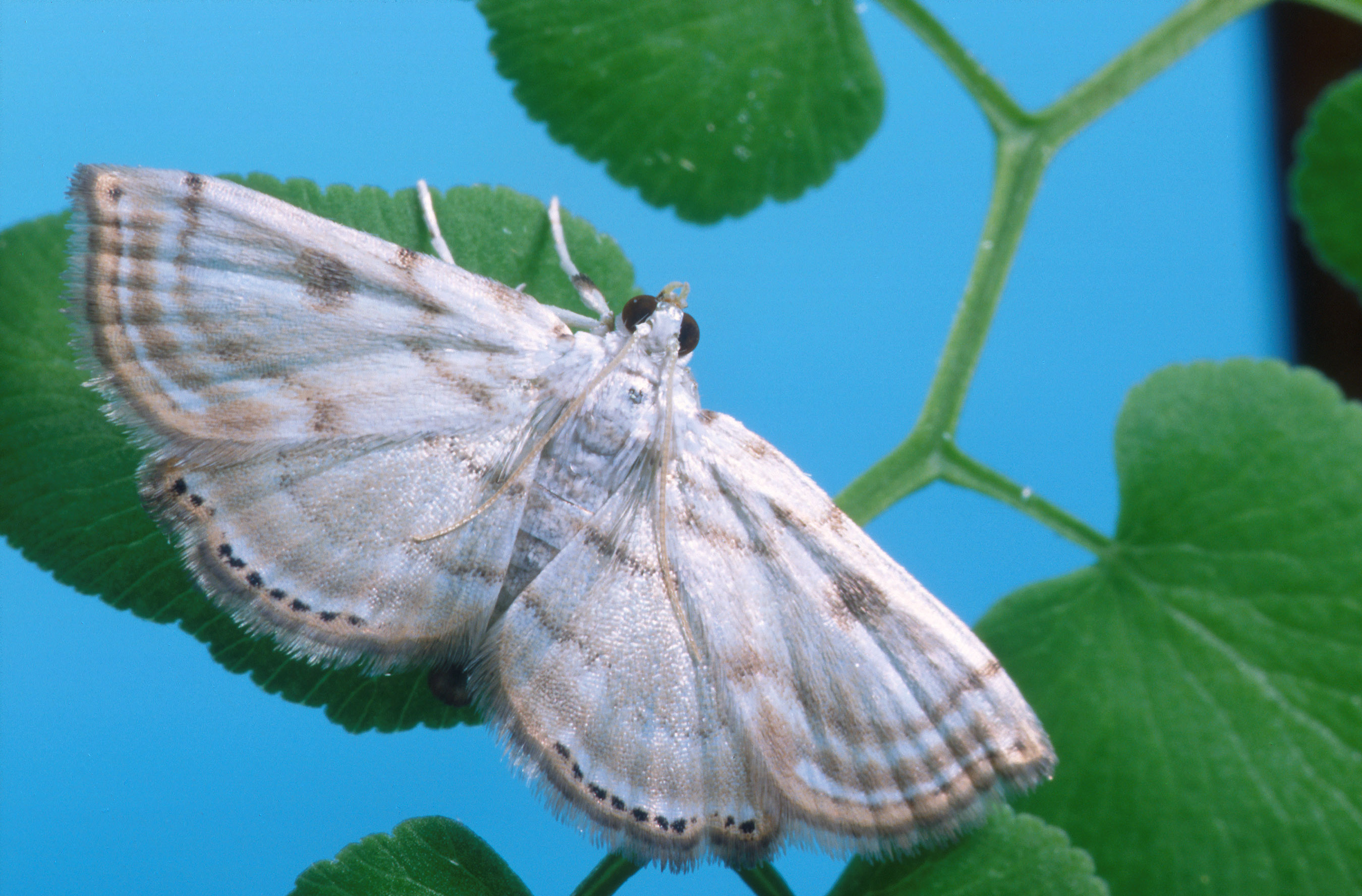
- Cataclysta camptozonale

Scientific classification
- Kingdom: Animalia
- Phylum: Arthropoda
- Clade: Pancrustacea
- Class: Insecta
- Order: Lepidoptera
- Family: Crambidae
- Subfamily: Musotiminae
- Genus: Austromusotima; Yen & Solis in Yen, Solis & Goolsby, 2004

= Austromusotima =

Genus of moths

Austromusotima is a genus of moths of the family Crambidae.

== Species ==
- Austromusotima camptozonale (Hampson, 1897)
- Austromusotima metastictalis (Hampson, 1917)
