= Austromusotima metastictalis =

Scientific classification
- Kingdom: Animalia
- Phylum: Arthropoda
- Class: Insecta
- Order: Lepidoptera
- Family: Crambidae
- Genus: Austromusotima
- Species: A. metastictalis

Binomial name
- Austromusotima metastictalis (Hampson, 1917)

Synonyms
- Nymphula metastictalis Hampson, 1917; Cataclysta metastictalis

Species of moth

Austromusotima metastictalis is a moth of the family Crambidae. It is found in New Guinea and possibly also in northern Queensland in Australia.

The length of the forewings is 7.8–8.4 mm. Adults are on wing throughout the year, usually peaking after the wet season.
