= Usingeriessa brunneosuffusa =

Scientific classification
- Kingdom: Animalia
- Phylum: Arthropoda
- Class: Insecta
- Order: Lepidoptera
- Family: Crambidae
- Genus: Usingeriessa
- Species: U. brunneosuffusa

Binomial name
- Usingeriessa brunneosuffusa (Hampson, 1917)

Synonyms
- Argyractis brunneosuffusa Hampson, 1917

Species of moth

Usingeriessa brunneosuffusa is a species of moth in the family Crambidae. It was described by George Hampson in 1917. It is found in Ecuador.
