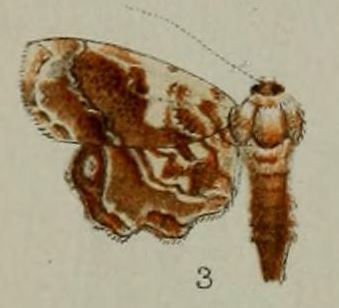
- Aeolopetra phoenicobapta

Scientific classification
- Kingdom: Animalia
- Phylum: Arthropoda
- Clade: Pancrustacea
- Class: Insecta
- Order: Lepidoptera
- Family: Crambidae
- Subfamily: Musotiminae
- Genus: Aeolopetra; Meyrick, 1934

= Aeolopetra =

Genus of moths

Aeolopetra is a genus of moths of the family Crambidae. It was described by Edward Meyrick in 1934.

== Species ==
- Aeolopetra lanyuensis Yen, 1996
- Aeolopetra palaeanthes Meyrick, 1934
- Aeolopetra phoenicobapta (Hampson, 1898)
