= Urola fimbrialis =

Scientific classification
- Domain: Eukaryota
- Kingdom: Animalia
- Phylum: Arthropoda
- Class: Insecta
- Order: Lepidoptera
- Family: Crambidae
- Subfamily: Crambinae
- Tribe: Argyriini
- Genus: Urola
- Species: U. fimbrialis

Binomial name
- Urola fimbrialis (Dyar, 1914)

Synonyms
- Argyria nivalis fimbrialis Dyar, 1914

Species of moth

Urola fimbrialis is a moth in the family Crambidae. It was described by Harrison Gray Dyar Jr. in 1914. It is found in Panama.
