= Lygomusotima constricta =

Scientific classification
- Kingdom: Animalia
- Phylum: Arthropoda
- Clade: Pancrustacea
- Class: Insecta
- Order: Lepidoptera
- Family: Crambidae
- Genus: Lygomusotima
- Species: L. constricta

Binomial name
- Lygomusotima constricta Solis & Yen in Solis, Yen & Goolsby, 2004

Species of moth

Lygomusotima constricta is a moth in the family Crambidae. It was described by Maria Alma Solis and Shen-Horn Yen in 2004. It is found in the Philippines (Luzon).

The length of the forewings is 6–7 mm

The larvae probably feed on Lygodium species.
