= Thysanoidma stellata =

Scientific classification
- Domain: Eukaryota
- Kingdom: Animalia
- Phylum: Arthropoda
- Class: Insecta
- Order: Lepidoptera
- Family: Crambidae
- Genus: Thysanoidma
- Species: T. stellata

Binomial name
- Thysanoidma stellata (Warren, 1896)

Synonyms
- Paracymoriza stellata Warren, 1896

Species of moth

Thysanoidma stellata is a moth in the family Crambidae. It was described by Warren in 1896. It is found in India.
