= Chrysendeton miralis =

Scientific classification
- Kingdom: Animalia
- Phylum: Arthropoda
- Class: Insecta
- Order: Lepidoptera
- Family: Crambidae
- Genus: Chrysendeton
- Species: C. miralis

Binomial name
- Chrysendeton miralis (Möschler, 1890)

Synonyms
- Cataclysta miralis Möschler, 1890

Species of moth

Chrysendeton miralis is a species of moth in the family Crambidae. It was described by Heinrich Benno Möschler in 1890. It is found in Puerto Rico.
