= Malleria =

Scientific classification
- Kingdom: Animalia
- Phylum: Arthropoda
- Class: Insecta
- Order: Lepidoptera
- Family: Crambidae
- Subfamily: Musotiminae
- Genus: Malleria; Munroe, 1959
- Species: M. argenteofulva

Binomial name
- Malleria argenteofulva Munroe, 1959

Genus of moths

Malleria is a genus of moths of the family Crambidae. It contains only one species, Malleria argenteofulva, which is found in Brazil (Santa Catarina).
