= Usingeriessa nigrifusalis =

Scientific classification
- Kingdom: Animalia
- Phylum: Arthropoda
- Class: Insecta
- Order: Lepidoptera
- Family: Crambidae
- Genus: Usingeriessa
- Species: U. nigrifusalis

Binomial name
- Usingeriessa nigrifusalis (Dognin, 1911)

Synonyms
- Argyractis nigrifusalis Dognin, 1911

Species of moth

Usingeriessa nigrifusalis is a species of moth in the family Crambidae. It was described by Paul Dognin in 1911. It is found in Colombia.
