= Neomusotima conspurcatalis =

Scientific classification
- Domain: Eukaryota
- Kingdom: Animalia
- Phylum: Arthropoda
- Class: Insecta
- Order: Lepidoptera
- Family: Crambidae
- Genus: Neomusotima
- Species: N. conspurcatalis

Binomial name
- Neomusotima conspurcatalis (Warren, 1896)

Synonyms
- Ambia conspurcatalis Warren, 1896; Musotima fuscalis Snellen, 1901

Species of moth

Neomusotima conspurcatalis is a moth in the family Crambidae. It was described by William Warren in 1896. It is found in India, Indonesia, East Timor and Australia.

The length of the forewings is 4–5 mm.

The larvae feed on Lygodium microphyllum. Young larvae skeletonize the leaves of their host plant, while older larvae consume entire leaves.
