= Lygomusotima =

Scientific classification
- Kingdom: Animalia
- Phylum: Arthropoda
- Clade: Pancrustacea
- Class: Insecta
- Order: Lepidoptera
- Family: Crambidae
- Subfamily: Musotiminae
- Genus: Lygomusotima; Solis & Yen in Solis, Yen & Goolsby, 2004

Genus of moths

Lygomusotima is a genus of moths of the family Crambidae.

== Species ==
- Lygomusotima constricta Solis & Yen in Solis, Yen & Goolsby, 2004
- Lygomusotima stria Solis & Yen in Solis, Yen & Goolsby, 2004
