= Baeoptila leptorrhoda =

Scientific classification
- Domain: Eukaryota
- Kingdom: Animalia
- Phylum: Arthropoda
- Class: Insecta
- Order: Lepidoptera
- Family: Crambidae
- Genus: Baeoptila
- Species: B. leptorrhoda

Binomial name
- Baeoptila leptorrhoda (Turner, 1908)

Synonyms
- Musotima leptorrhoda Turner, 1908

Species of moth

Baeoptila leptorrhoda is a moth in the family Crambidae. It was described by Turner in 1908. It is found in Australia.
