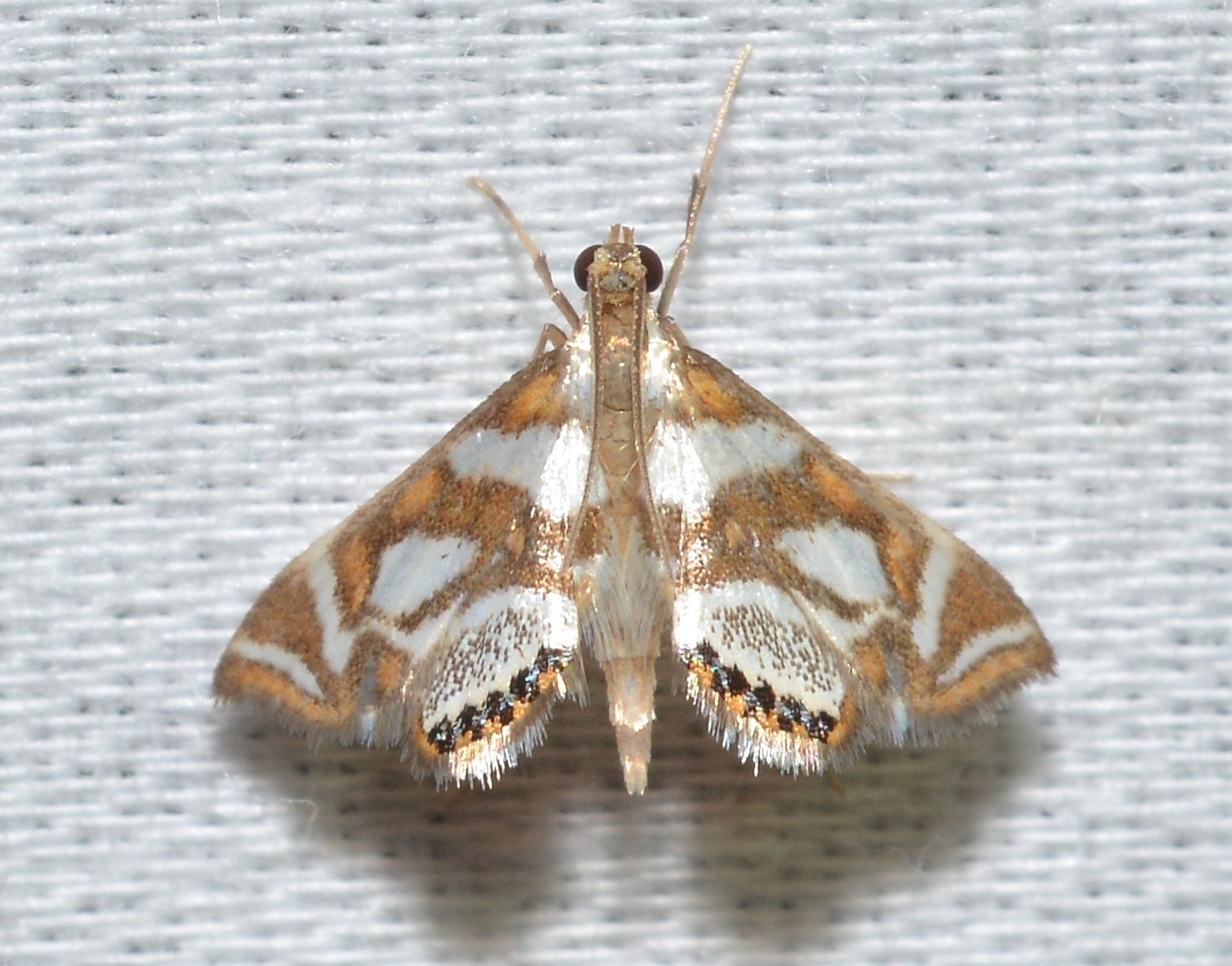

Scientific classification
- Kingdom: Animalia
- Phylum: Arthropoda
- Class: Insecta
- Order: Lepidoptera
- Family: Crambidae
- Genus: Chrysendeton
- Species: C. medicinalis

Binomial name
- Chrysendeton medicinalis (Grote, 1881)

Synonyms
- Cataclysta medicinalis Grote, 1881

= Chrysendeton medicinalis =

Species of moth

Chrysendeton medicinalis, the bold medicine moth, is a species of moth in the family Crambidae. It was described by Augustus Radcliffe Grote in 1881. It is found on North America, where it has been recorded from Alabama, Florida, Georgia, Illinois, Indiana, Kentucky, Maryland, Mississippi, North Carolina, Ohio, Pennsylvania, South Carolina, Tennessee, Texas and West Virginia.

The wingspan is about 12 mm. Adults are white, ocherous and brown, with a silvery-white sub-basal band continuing over the hindwings. there is a white median patch followed by a curved white line. There is also a white oblique band at the apical third and a white band along the external margin. There is an ocherous shade between the median patch and the costal band, divided by a brown line. Adults have been recorded on wing nearly year round in the southern part of the range.
