= Chrysendeton bronachalis =

Scientific classification
- Kingdom: Animalia
- Phylum: Arthropoda
- Class: Insecta
- Order: Lepidoptera
- Family: Crambidae
- Genus: Chrysendeton
- Species: C. bronachalis

Binomial name
- Chrysendeton bronachalis (Schaus, 1924)

Synonyms
- Cataclysta bronachalis Schaus, 1924

Species of moth

Chrysendeton bronachalis is a species of moth in the family Crambidae. It was described by Schaus in 1924. It is found in Cuba.
