= Chrysendeton melatornalis =

Scientific classification
- Kingdom: Animalia
- Phylum: Arthropoda
- Class: Insecta
- Order: Lepidoptera
- Family: Crambidae
- Genus: Chrysendeton
- Species: C. melatornalis

Binomial name
- Chrysendeton melatornalis (Hampson, 1906)

Synonyms
- Cataclysta melatornalis Hampson, 1906

Species of moth

Chrysendeton melatornalis is a species of moth in the family Crambidae. It was described by George Hampson in 1906. It is found in Brazil.
