= Albusambia =

Scientific classification
- Kingdom: Animalia
- Phylum: Arthropoda
- Clade: Pancrustacea
- Class: Insecta
- Order: Lepidoptera
- Family: Crambidae
- Subfamily: Musotiminae
- Genus: Albusambia; Solis & Davis in Solis, Davis & Nishida, 2005
- Species: A. elaphoglossumae

Binomial name
- Albusambia elaphoglossumae Solis & Davis in Solis, Davis & Nishida, 2005

Genus of moths

Albusambia is a genus of moths of the family Crambidae. It contains only one species, Albusambia elaphoglossumae, which is found in Central America, where it has been recorded from the Costa Rican San José and Cartago Provinces at altitudes between 2,300 and 3,100 meters.

The larvae feed on Elaphoglossum conspersum. They mine the fronds of their host plant.
