= Aeolopetra lanyuensis =

Scientific classification
- Kingdom: Animalia
- Phylum: Arthropoda
- Clade: Pancrustacea
- Class: Insecta
- Order: Lepidoptera
- Family: Crambidae
- Genus: Aeolopetra
- Species: A. lanyuensis

Binomial name
- Aeolopetra lanyuensis Yen, 1996

Species of moth

Aeolopetra lanyuensis is a moth in the family Crambidae. It was described by Shen-Horn Yen in 1996. It is found in Taiwan, where it has been recorded from Lanyu Island.
