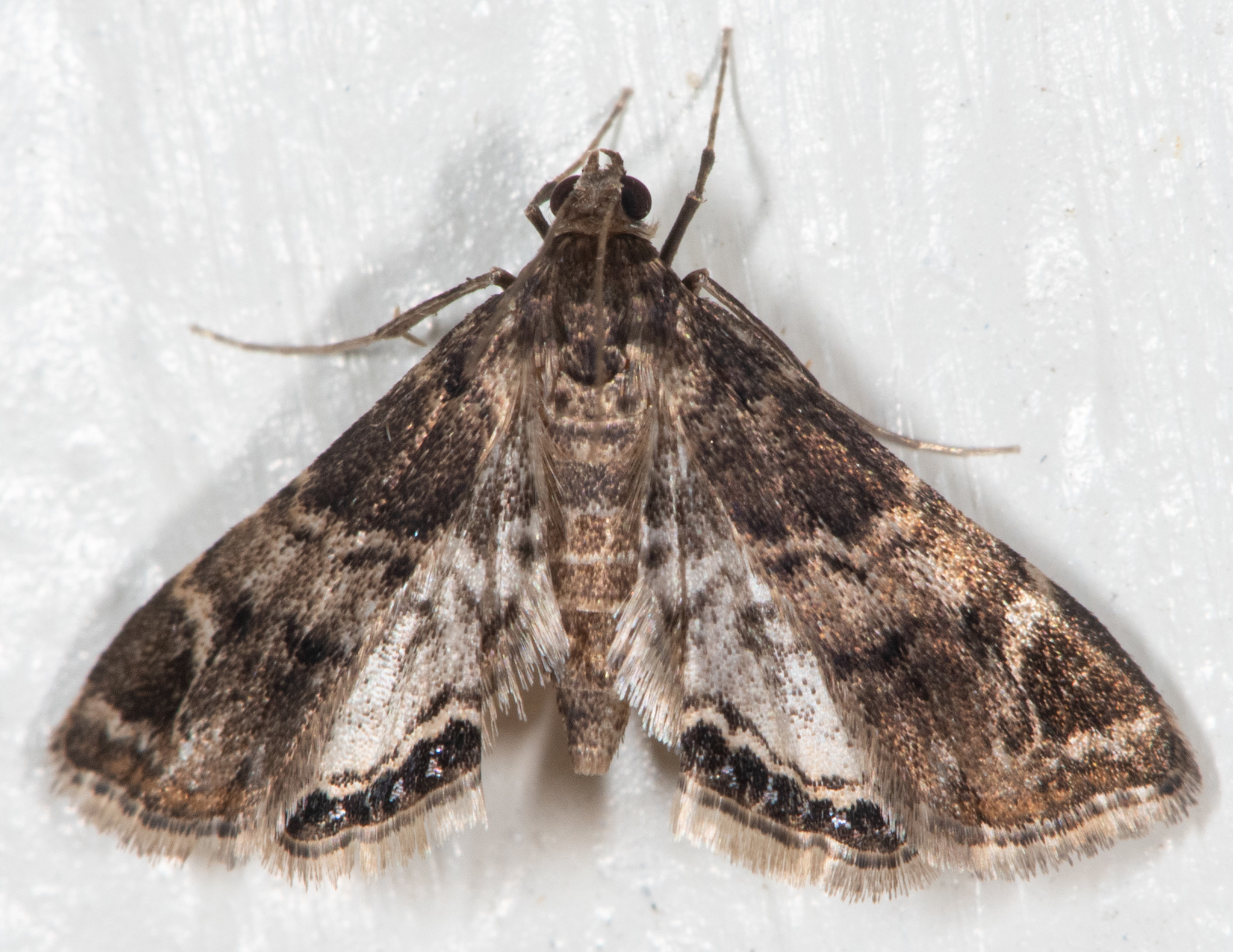

Scientific classification
- Kingdom: Animalia
- Phylum: Arthropoda
- Class: Insecta
- Order: Lepidoptera
- Family: Crambidae
- Genus: Usingeriessa
- Species: U. brunnildalis

Binomial name
- Usingeriessa brunnildalis (Dyar, 1906)

Synonyms
- Elophila brunnildalis Dyar, 1906

= Usingeriessa brunnildalis =

Species of moth

Usingeriessa brunnildalis is a species of moth in the family Crambidae. It was described by Harrison Gray Dyar Jr. in 1906. It has been recorded in the US states of California and Texas.

The length of the forewings is 7.5–11 mm. The forewings are dark brown, but lighter in the median area and at the anal angle. The hindwings are gray. Adults have been recorded on wing from August to October.

The larvae live on rocks in streams covered in algae.
