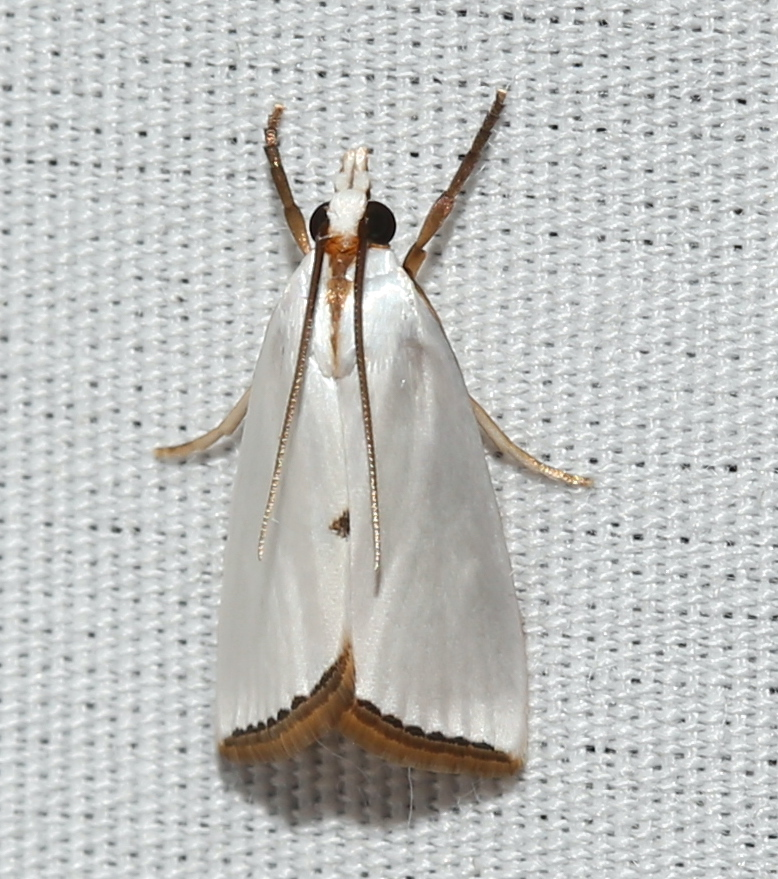

Scientific classification
- Kingdom: Animalia
- Phylum: Arthropoda
- Clade: Pancrustacea
- Class: Insecta
- Order: Lepidoptera
- Family: Crambidae
- Subfamily: Crambinae
- Tribe: Argyriini
- Genus: Urola
- Species: U. nivalis

Binomial name
- Urola nivalis (Drury, 1773)

Synonyms
- Phalaena nivalis Drury, 1773; Geometra argentata Emmons, 1854; Urola michrochysella Walker, 1863; Urola microchrysella Möschler, 1890; Urola microchysella Munroe, 1995

= Urola nivalis =

Species of moth

Urola nivalis, the snowy urola moth, is a moth of the family Crambidae. It is found from southern Canada and Maine, south to Florida and west to Illinois and Texas.

The wingspan is 15–23 mm. Adults are on wing from May to September in two generations per year.

The larvae feed on various grasses and are considered a pest of Ligustrum species.
