= Urola furvicornis =

Scientific classification
- Kingdom: Animalia
- Phylum: Arthropoda
- Clade: Pancrustacea
- Class: Insecta
- Order: Lepidoptera
- Family: Crambidae
- Subfamily: Crambinae
- Tribe: Argyriini
- Genus: Urola
- Species: U. furvicornis

Binomial name
- Urola furvicornis (Zeller, 1877)

Synonyms
- Argyria furvicornis Zeller, 1877

Species of moth

Urola furvicornis is a moth in the family Crambidae. It was described by Philipp Christoph Zeller in 1877. It is found in Brazil.
