= Chrysendeton bromachalis =

Scientific classification
- Kingdom: Animalia
- Phylum: Arthropoda
- Class: Insecta
- Order: Lepidoptera
- Family: Crambidae
- Genus: Chrysendeton
- Species: C. bromachalis

Binomial name
- Chrysendeton bromachalis (Schaus, 1940)

Synonyms
- Cataclysta bromachalis Schaus, 1940

Species of moth

Chrysendeton bromachalis is a species of moth in the family Crambidae. It was described by Schaus in 1940. It is found in Puerto Rico.
