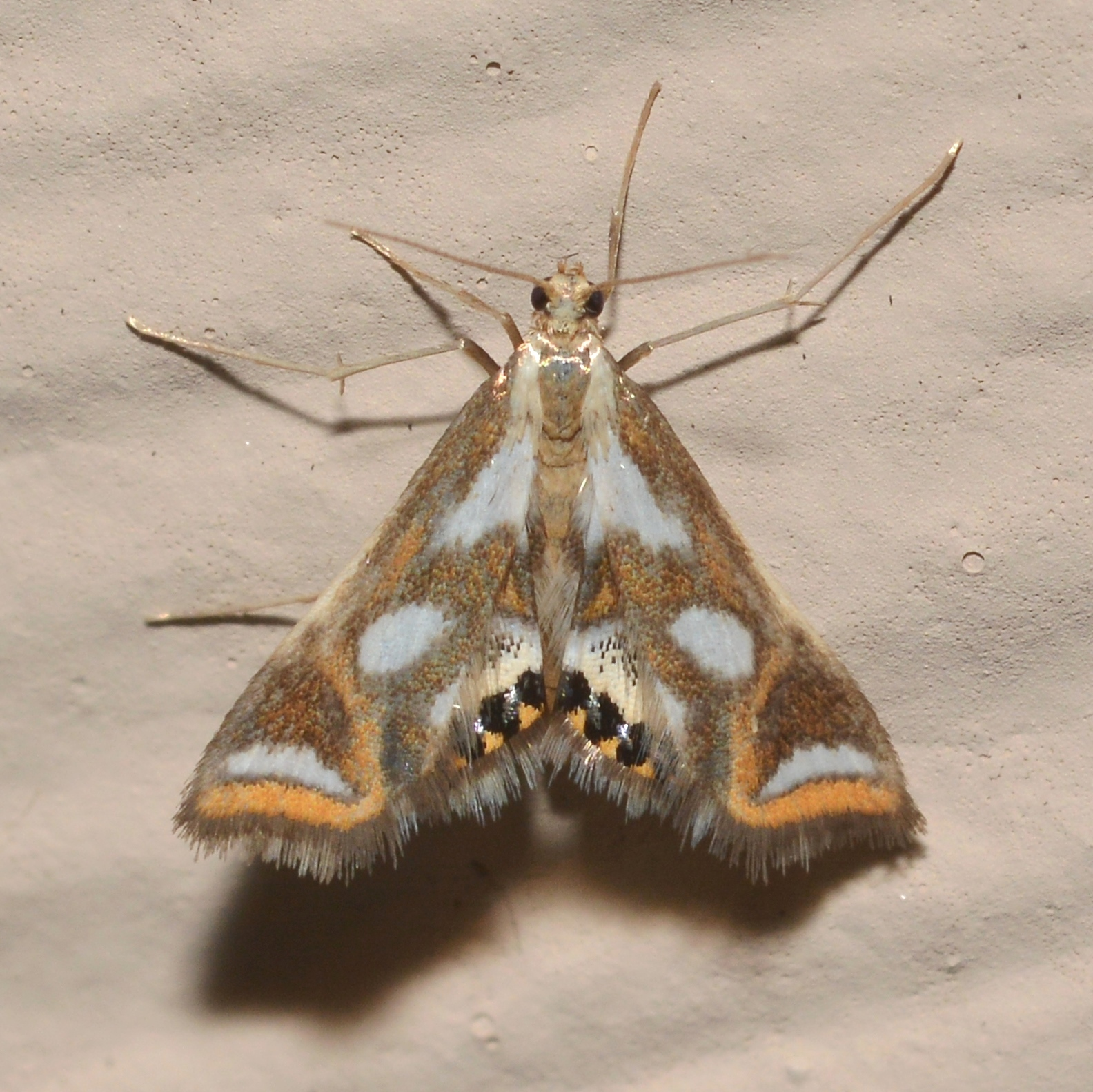
- Specimen of Chrysendeton imitabilis.

Scientific classification
- Domain: Eukaryota
- Kingdom: Animalia
- Phylum: Arthropoda
- Class: Insecta
- Order: Lepidoptera
- Family: Crambidae
- Subfamily: Acentropinae
- Genus: Chrysendeton; Grote, 1881

= Chrysendeton =

Genus of moths

Chrysendeton is a genus of moths of the family Crambidae described by Augustus Radcliffe Grote in 1881.

== Species ==
- Chrysendeton anicitalis (Schaus, 1924)
- Chrysendeton autobella (Dyar, 1914)
- Chrysendeton azadasalis (Schaus, 1924)
- Chrysendeton bromachalis (Schaus, 1940)
- Chrysendeton bronachalis (Schaus, 1924)
- Chrysendeton chalcitis (C. Felder, R. Felder & Rogenhofer, 1875)
- Chrysendeton claudialis (Walker, 1859)
- Chrysendeton cumalis (Druce, 1896)
- Chrysendeton divulsalis (Walker, 1866)
- Chrysendeton imitabilis (Dyar, 1917)
- Chrysendeton kimballi Lange, 1956
- Chrysendeton mangholdalis (Schaus, 1924)
- Chrysendeton medicinalis Grote, 1881
- Chrysendeton melatornalis (Hampson, 1906)
- Chrysendeton minimalis (Herrich-Schäffer, 1871)
- Chrysendeton miralis (Möschler, 1890)
- Chrysendeton nigrescens Heppner, 1991
- Chrysendeton romanalis (Druce, 1896)
- Chrysendeton tessellalis (Hampson, 1897)
- Chrysendeton vacuolata (Dyar, 1914)
