= Baeoptila =

Scientific classification
- Domain: Eukaryota
- Kingdom: Animalia
- Phylum: Arthropoda
- Class: Insecta
- Order: Lepidoptera
- Family: Crambidae
- Subfamily: Musotiminae
- Genus: Baeoptila; Turner, 1908

Genus of moths

Baeoptila is a genus of moths of the family Crambidae.

== Species ==
- Baeoptila leptorrhoda (Turner, 1908)
- Baeoptila oculalis (Hampson, 1897)
- Baeoptila selenias Turner, 1908
