= Cilaus =

Scientific classification
- Domain: Eukaryota
- Kingdom: Animalia
- Phylum: Arthropoda
- Class: Insecta
- Order: Lepidoptera
- Family: Crambidae
- Subfamily: Musotiminae
- Genus: Cilaus de Joannis, 1932
- Species: C. longinasus

Binomial name
- Cilaus longinasus de Joannis, 1932

Genus of moths

Cilaus is a monotypic moth genus of the family Crambidae described by Joseph de Joannis in 1932. Its one species, Cilaus longinasus, described by the same author in the same year, is only known from the medium altitudes of Réunion in the Indian Ocean.

The name of the genus Cilaus is probably a misspelling of Cilaos, the valley of origin of the holotype of this species.
