= Chrysendeton romanalis =

Scientific classification
- Kingdom: Animalia
- Phylum: Arthropoda
- Class: Insecta
- Order: Lepidoptera
- Family: Crambidae
- Genus: Chrysendeton
- Species: C. romanalis

Binomial name
- Chrysendeton romanalis (H. Druce, 1896)

Synonyms
- Cataclysta romanalis H. Druce, 1896

Species of moth

Chrysendeton romanalis is a species of moth in the family Crambidae. It was described by Herbert Druce in 1896. It is found in Mexico.
