= Barisoa =

Scientific classification
- Domain: Eukaryota
- Kingdom: Animalia
- Phylum: Arthropoda
- Class: Insecta
- Order: Lepidoptera
- Family: Crambidae
- Subfamily: Musotiminae
- Genus: Barisoa; Möschler, 1886
- Species: B. intentalis

Binomial name
- Barisoa intentalis Möschler, 1886

Genus of moths

Barisoa is a genus of moths of the family Crambidae. It contains only one species, Barisoa intentalis, which is found in Jamaica.
