= Chrysendeton azadasalis =

Scientific classification
- Kingdom: Animalia
- Phylum: Arthropoda
- Class: Insecta
- Order: Lepidoptera
- Family: Crambidae
- Genus: Chrysendeton
- Species: C. azadasalis

Binomial name
- Chrysendeton azadasalis (Schaus, 1924)

Synonyms
- Cataclysta azadasalis Schaus, 1924

Species of moth

Chrysendeton azadasalis is a species of moth in the family Crambidae. It was described by William Schaus in 1924. It is found in Guyana.

The wingspan is about 12 mm. The forewings are white, with a subbasal brown fascia edged with black and followed by a faint fuscous line from within the cell and an antemedial fine black line. The hindwings are white, crossed by irregular black lines. There is a fuscous patch at the base.
