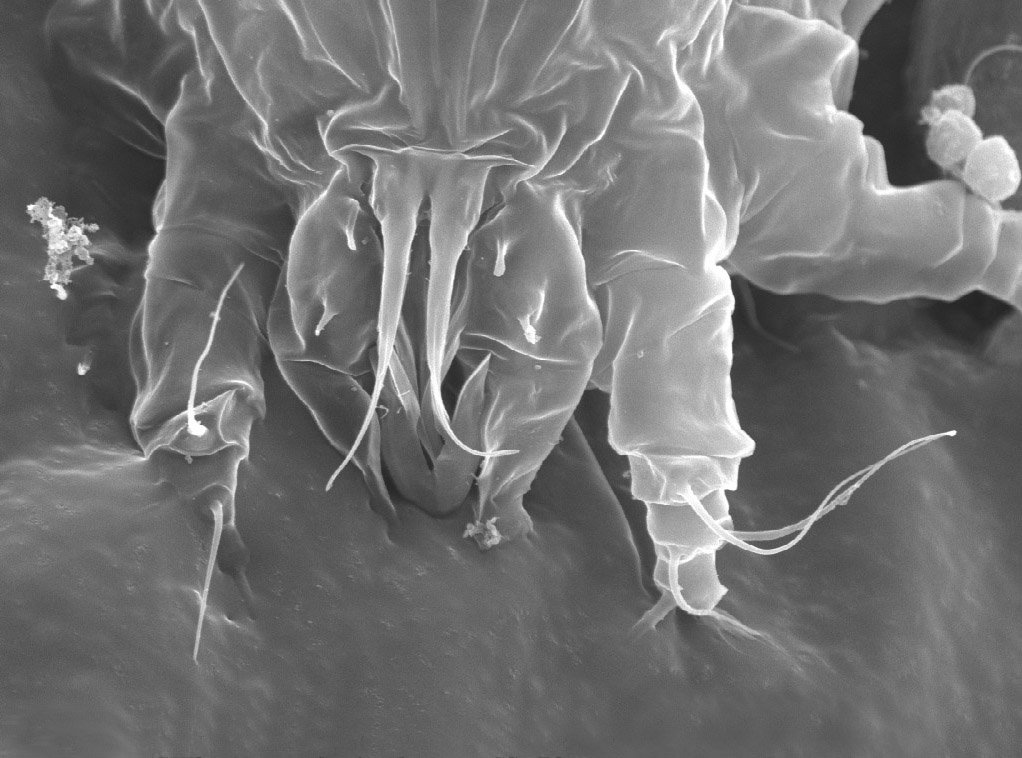

Scientific classification
- Kingdom: Animalia
- Phylum: Arthropoda
- Subphylum: Chelicerata
- Class: Arachnida
- Order: Trombidiformes
- Family: Eriophyidae
- Genus: Floracarus
- Species: F. perrepae

Binomial name
- Floracarus perrepae Knihinicki & Boczek, 2002

= Floracarus perrepae =

Species of mite

Floracarus perrepae is a species of herbivorous mite belonging to the family Eriophyidae. It is native to Australia (Queensland), China and New Caledonia. As it is known to attack and eat the invasive fern species Lygodium microphyllum, it is being considered for use as a biological pest control agent in Florida.
