= Chrysendeton tessellalis =

Scientific classification
- Kingdom: Animalia
- Phylum: Arthropoda
- Class: Insecta
- Order: Lepidoptera
- Family: Crambidae
- Genus: Chrysendeton
- Species: C. tessellalis

Binomial name
- Chrysendeton tessellalis (Hampson, 1897)

Synonyms
- Cataclysta tessellalis Hampson, 1897

Species of moth

Chrysendeton tessellalis is a species of moth in the family Crambidae. It was described by George Hampson in 1897. It is found in São Paulo, Brazil.
