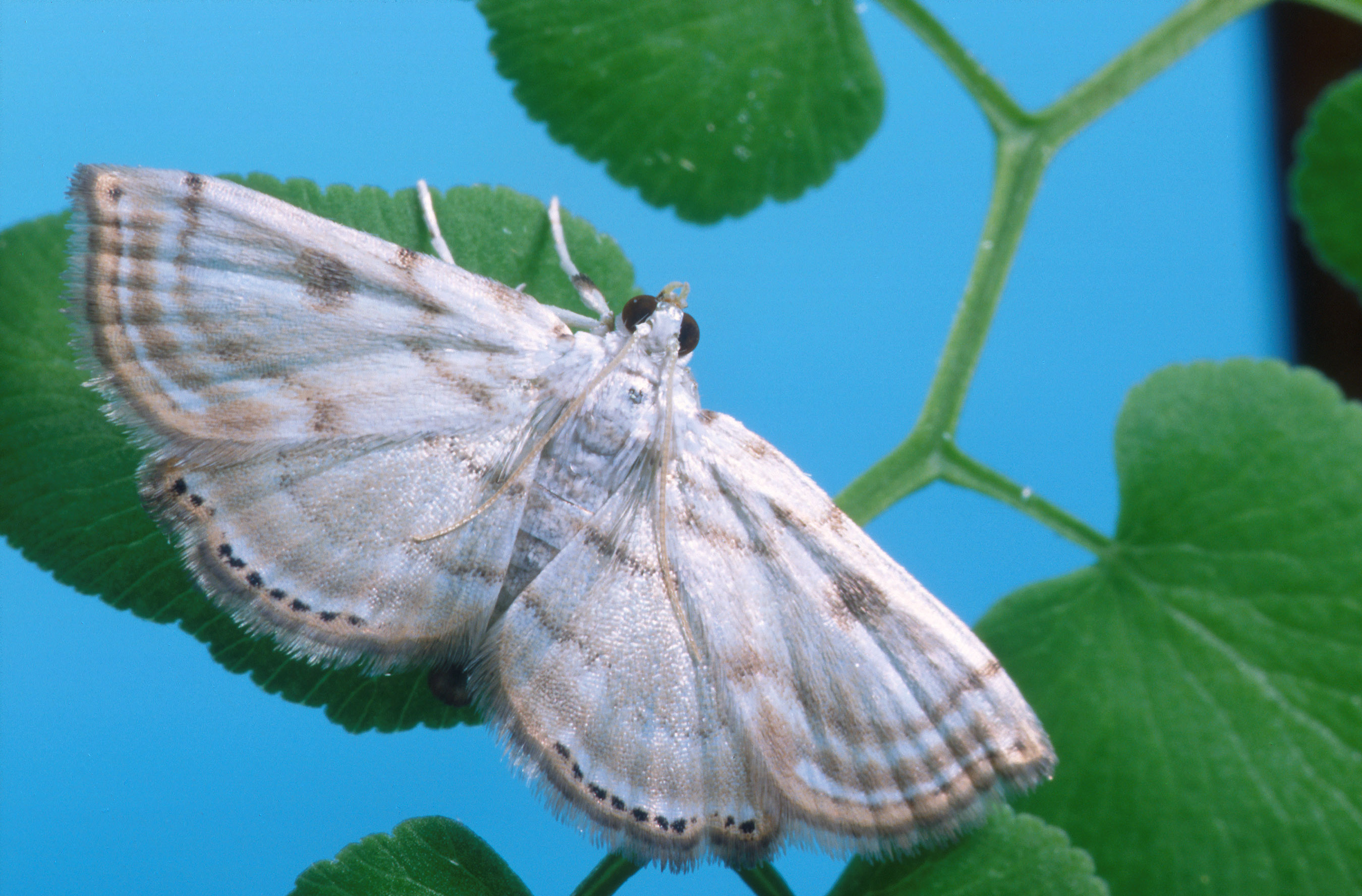

Scientific classification
- Domain: Eukaryota
- Kingdom: Animalia
- Phylum: Arthropoda
- Class: Insecta
- Order: Lepidoptera
- Family: Crambidae
- Genus: Austromusotima
- Species: A. camptozonale

Binomial name
- Austromusotima camptozonale (Hampson, 1897)

Synonyms
- Cataclysta camptozonale; Oligostigma camptozonale Hampson, 1897

= Austromusotima camptozonale =

Species of moth

Austromusotima camptozonale, the climbing maidhair pyralid moth, is a moth of the family Crambidae. It is native to Australia, but attempts have been made to introduce it to southern Florida as a biological control agent for Old World climbing fern.

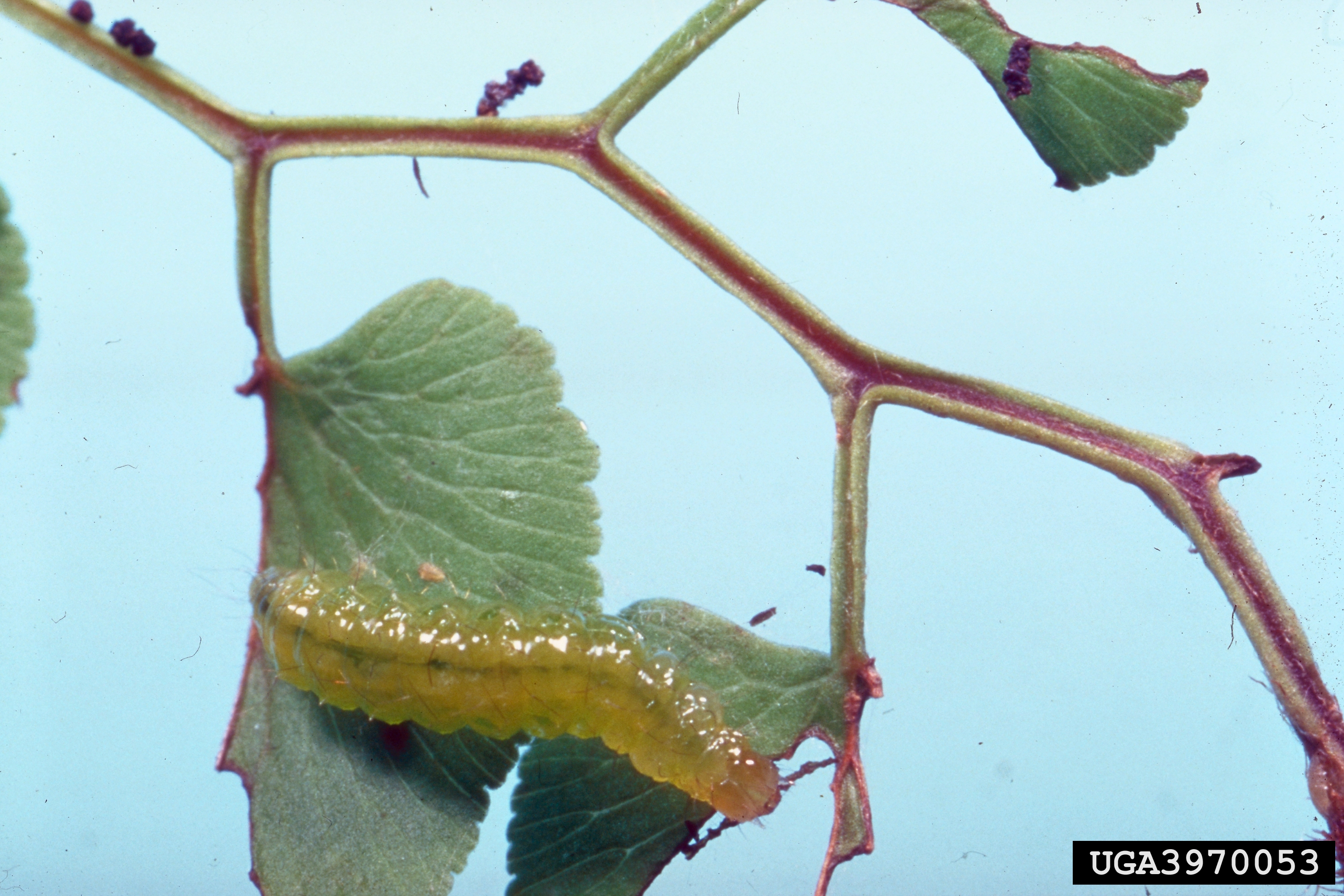

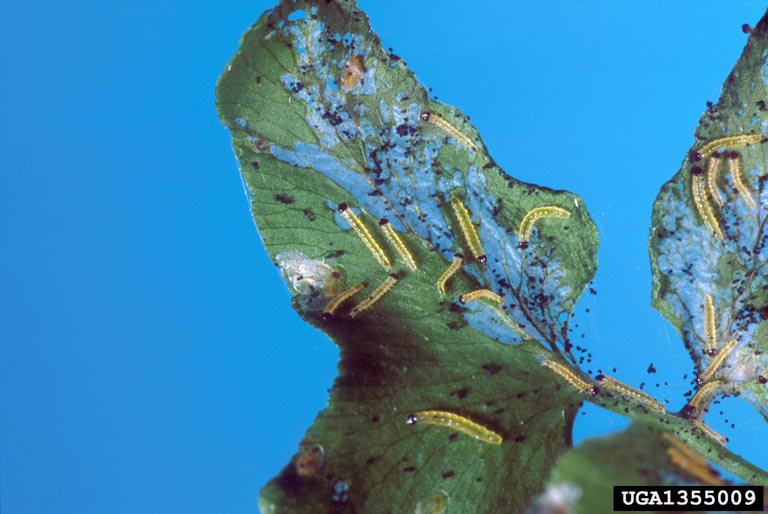

The wingspan is about 10 mm.

The larvae feed on Lygodium microphyllum, Lygodium japonicum and Lygodium palmatum.
