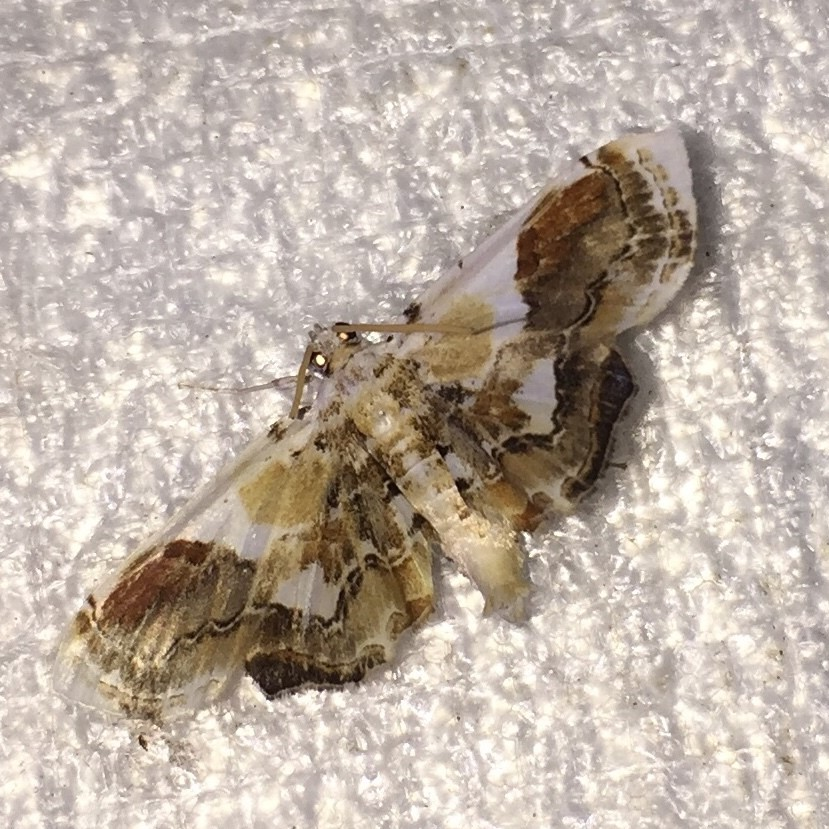

Scientific classification
- Kingdom: Animalia
- Phylum: Arthropoda
- Clade: Pancrustacea
- Class: Insecta
- Order: Lepidoptera
- Family: Crambidae
- Genus: Aeolopetra
- Species: A. palaeanthes

Binomial name
- Aeolopetra palaeanthes Meyrick, 1934

= Aeolopetra palaeanthes =

Species of moth

Aeolopetra palaeanthes is a species of moth in the family Crambidae. It was first described by Edward Meyrick in 1934. It is found on Fiji.
