= Chrysendeton autobella =

Scientific classification
- Kingdom: Animalia
- Phylum: Arthropoda
- Class: Insecta
- Order: Lepidoptera
- Family: Crambidae
- Genus: Chrysendeton
- Species: C. autobella

Binomial name
- Chrysendeton autobella (Dyar, 1914)

Synonyms
- Cataclysta autobella Dyar, 1914

Species of moth

Chrysendeton autobella is a species of moth in the family Crambidae. It was described by Harrison Gray Dyar Jr. in 1914. It is found in Panama.
