= Baeoptila selenias =

Scientific classification
- Domain: Eukaryota
- Kingdom: Animalia
- Phylum: Arthropoda
- Class: Insecta
- Order: Lepidoptera
- Family: Crambidae
- Genus: Baeoptila
- Species: B. selenias

Binomial name
- Baeoptila selenias Turner, 1908

Species of moth

Baeoptila selenias is a moth in the family Crambidae. It was described by Turner in 1908. It is found in Australia.

== Etymology ==
In his description of the genus and species, Turner gave the following etymologies: "(Baioptilos, with little wings)" and "(Selene, the moon, in allusion to the crescentic markings)".
