= Drosophantis =

Scientific classification
- Kingdom: Animalia
- Phylum: Arthropoda
- Class: Insecta
- Order: Lepidoptera
- Family: Crambidae
- Subfamily: Musotiminae
- Genus: Drosophantis; Meyrick, 1935
- Species: D. caeruleata

Binomial name
- Drosophantis caeruleata (Hampson, 1893)

Synonyms
- Ambia caeruleata Hampson, 1893; Ambia cyanealis Hampson, 1903; Drosophantis corusca Meyrick, 1935

Genus of moths

Drosophantis is a genus of moths of the family Crambidae. It contains only one species, Drosophantis caeruleata, which is found from India and Sri Lanka east to Taiwan, Thailand, Sumbawa and Australia (Robinson et al., 1994)
