= Usingeriessa symphonalis =

Scientific classification
- Kingdom: Animalia
- Phylum: Arthropoda
- Class: Insecta
- Order: Lepidoptera
- Family: Crambidae
- Genus: Usingeriessa
- Species: U. symphonalis

Binomial name
- Usingeriessa symphonalis (Dyar, 1914)

Synonyms
- Cataclysta symphonalis Dyar, 1914

Species of moth

Usingeriessa symphonalis is a species of moth in the family Crambidae. It was described by Harrison Gray Dyar Jr. in 1914. It is found in Panama.
