= Elachypteryx =

Scientific classification
- Domain: Eukaryota
- Kingdom: Animalia
- Phylum: Arthropoda
- Class: Insecta
- Order: Lepidoptera
- Family: Crambidae
- Subfamily: Musotiminae
- Genus: Elachypteryx; Turner, 1908

Genus of moths

Elachypteryx is a genus of moths of the family Crambidae.

== Species ==
- Elachypteryx callidryas (Turner, 1922)
- Elachypteryx erebenna Turner, 1908
