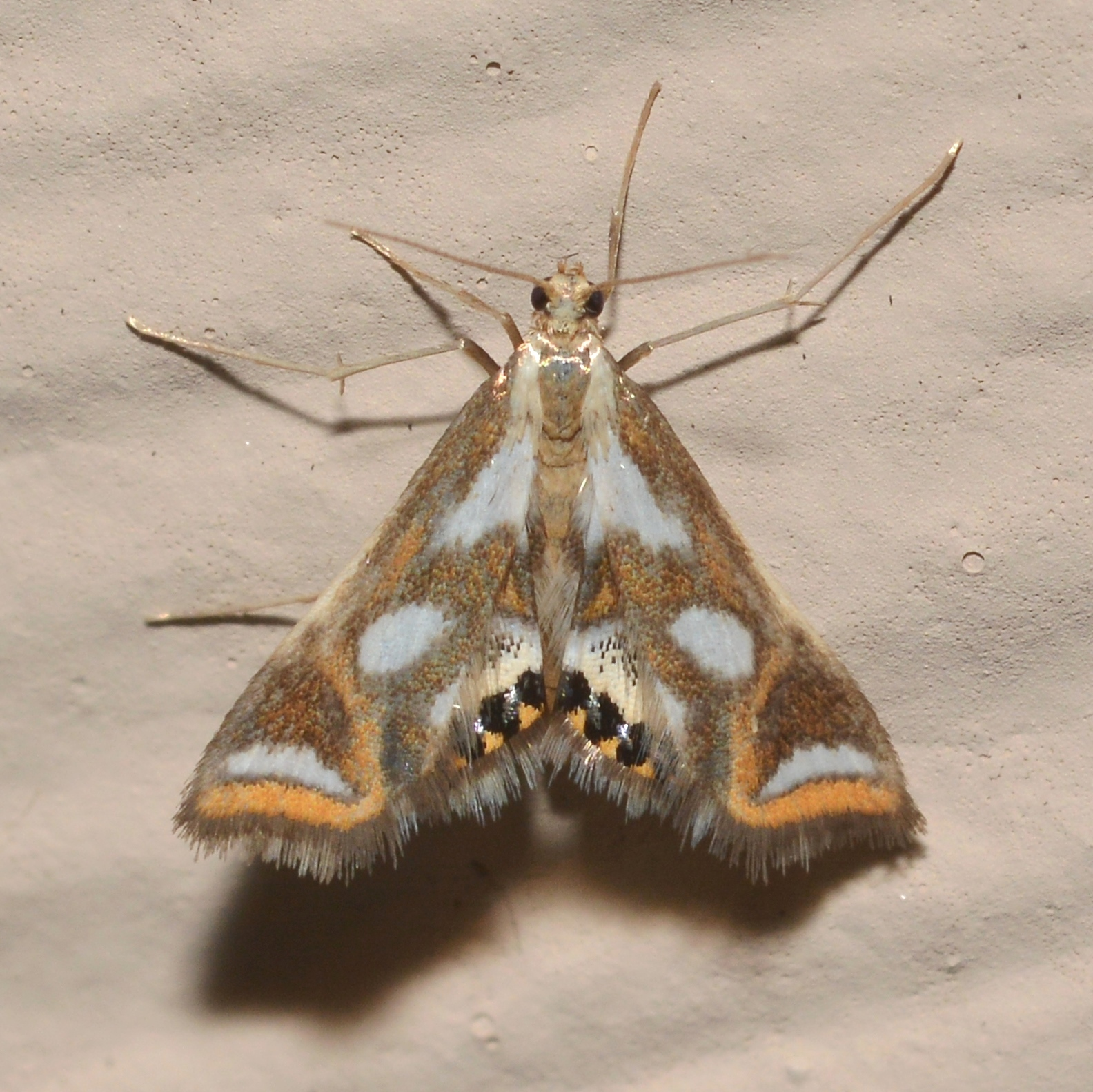

Scientific classification
- Kingdom: Animalia
- Phylum: Arthropoda
- Class: Insecta
- Order: Lepidoptera
- Family: Crambidae
- Genus: Chrysendeton
- Species: C. imitabilis

Binomial name
- Chrysendeton imitabilis (Dyar, 1917)

Synonyms
- Elophila imitabilis Dyar, 1917

= Chrysendeton imitabilis =

Species of moth

Chrysendeton imitabilis is a species of moth in the family Crambidae. It was described by Harrison Gray Dyar Jr. in 1917. It is found in North America, from Pennsylvania to Florida and west to Illinois.

Adults are on wing from April throughout the summer.
