= Chrysendeton kimballi =

Scientific classification
- Kingdom: Animalia
- Phylum: Arthropoda
- Class: Insecta
- Order: Lepidoptera
- Family: Crambidae
- Genus: Chrysendeton
- Species: C. kimballi

Binomial name
- Chrysendeton kimballi Lange, 1956

Species of moth

Chrysendeton kimballi is a species of moth in the family Crambidae. It was described by William Harry Lange in 1956. It is found on North America, where it has been recorded from the U.S. states of Florida, Louisiana, Mississippi and South Carolina. March to October.
