= Chrysendeton anicitalis =

Scientific classification
- Kingdom: Animalia
- Phylum: Arthropoda
- Class: Insecta
- Order: Lepidoptera
- Family: Crambidae
- Genus: Chrysendeton
- Species: C. anicitalis

Binomial name
- Chrysendeton anicitalis (Schaus, 1924)

Synonyms
- Cataclysta anicitalis Schaus, 1924

Species of moth

Chrysendeton anicitalis is a species of moth in the family Crambidae. It was described by Schaus in 1924. It is found in Cuba.
