= Elachypteryx erebenna =

Scientific classification
- Domain: Eukaryota
- Kingdom: Animalia
- Phylum: Arthropoda
- Class: Insecta
- Order: Lepidoptera
- Family: Crambidae
- Genus: Elachypteryx
- Species: E. erebenna

Binomial name
- Elachypteryx erebenna Turner, 1908

Species of moth

Elachypteryx erebenna is a moth in the family Crambidae. It was described by Turner in 1908. It is found in Australia.
