= Midilambia =

Scientific classification
- Kingdom: Animalia
- Phylum: Arthropoda
- Class: Insecta
- Order: Lepidoptera
- Family: Crambidae
- Subfamily: Musotiminae
- Genus: Midilambia; Munroe, 1969
- Species: M. colombiana

Binomial name
- Midilambia colombiana (Schaus, 1933)

Synonyms
- Cacographis colombiana Schaus, 1933

Genus of moths

Midilambia is a genus of moths of the family Crambidae. It contains only one species, Midilambia colombiana, which is found in Colombia.
