= Usingeriessa psalmoidalis =

Scientific classification
- Kingdom: Animalia
- Phylum: Arthropoda
- Class: Insecta
- Order: Lepidoptera
- Family: Crambidae
- Genus: Usingeriessa
- Species: U. psalmoidalis

Binomial name
- Usingeriessa psalmoidalis (Schaus, 1924)

Synonyms
- Argyractis psalmoidalis Schaus, 1924

Species of moth

Usingeriessa psalmoidalis is a species of moth in the family Crambidae. It was described by Schaus in 1924. It is found in Cuba.
