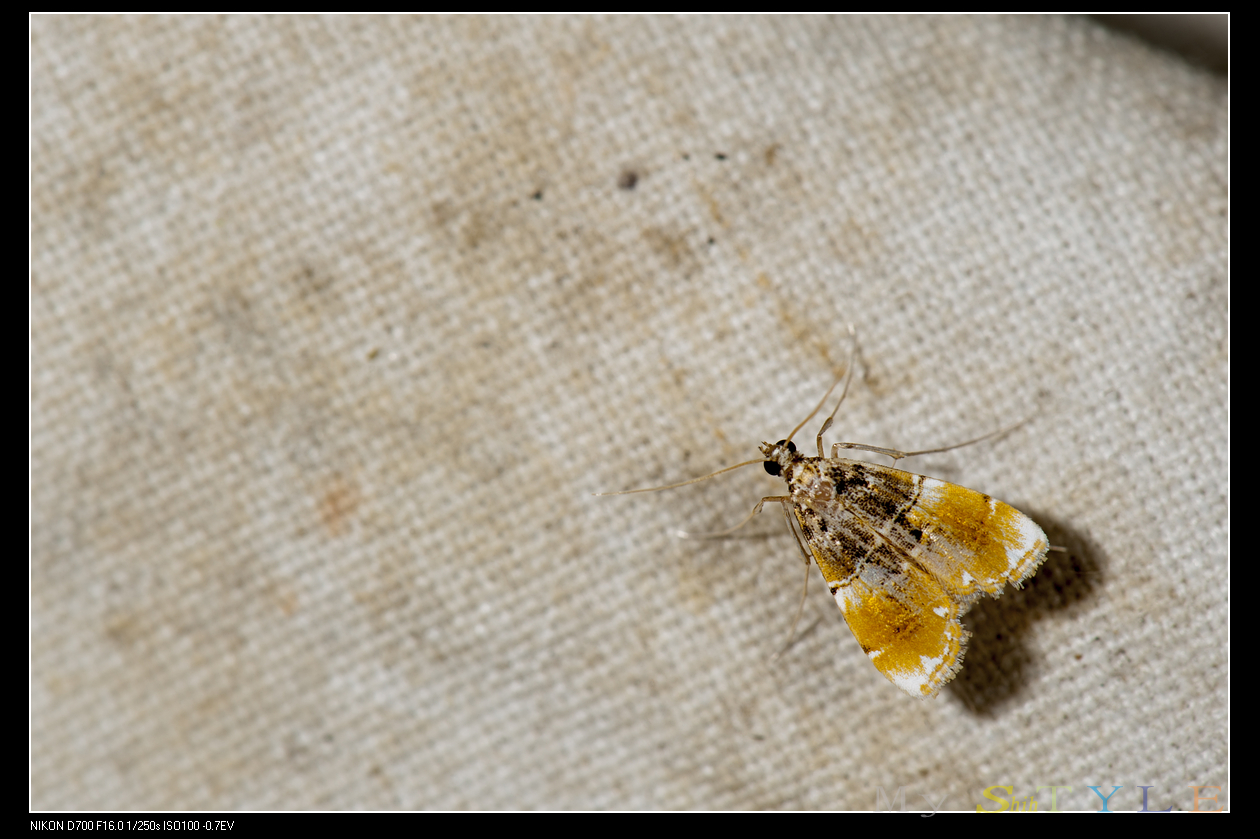
- Thysanoidma octalis

Scientific classification
- Kingdom: Animalia
- Phylum: Arthropoda
- Clade: Pancrustacea
- Class: Insecta
- Order: Lepidoptera
- Family: Crambidae
- Subfamily: Musotiminae
- Genus: Thysanoidma; Hampson, 1891

= Thysanoidma =

Genus of moths

Thysanoidma is a genus of moths of the family Crambidae described by George Hampson in 1891.

== Species ==
- Thysanoidma octalis Hampson, 1891
- Thysanoidma stellata (Warren, 1896)
