= Chrysendeton claudialis =

Scientific classification
- Kingdom: Animalia
- Phylum: Arthropoda
- Class: Insecta
- Order: Lepidoptera
- Family: Crambidae
- Genus: Chrysendeton
- Species: C. claudialis

Binomial name
- Chrysendeton claudialis (Walker, 1859)

Synonyms
- Cataclysta claudialis Walker, 1859

Species of moth

Chrysendeton claudialis is a species of moth in the family Crambidae. It was described by Francis Walker in 1859. It is found on Hispaniola and Cuba.
