= Chrysendeton minimalis =

Scientific classification
- Kingdom: Animalia
- Phylum: Arthropoda
- Class: Insecta
- Order: Lepidoptera
- Family: Crambidae
- Genus: Chrysendeton
- Species: C. minimalis

Binomial name
- Chrysendeton minimalis (Herrich-Schäffer, 1871)

Synonyms
- Cataclysta minimalis Herrich-Schäffer, 1871

Species of moth

Chrysendeton minimalis is a species of moth in the family Crambidae. It was described by Gottlieb August Wilhelm Herrich-Schäffer in 1871. It is found in Cuba.
