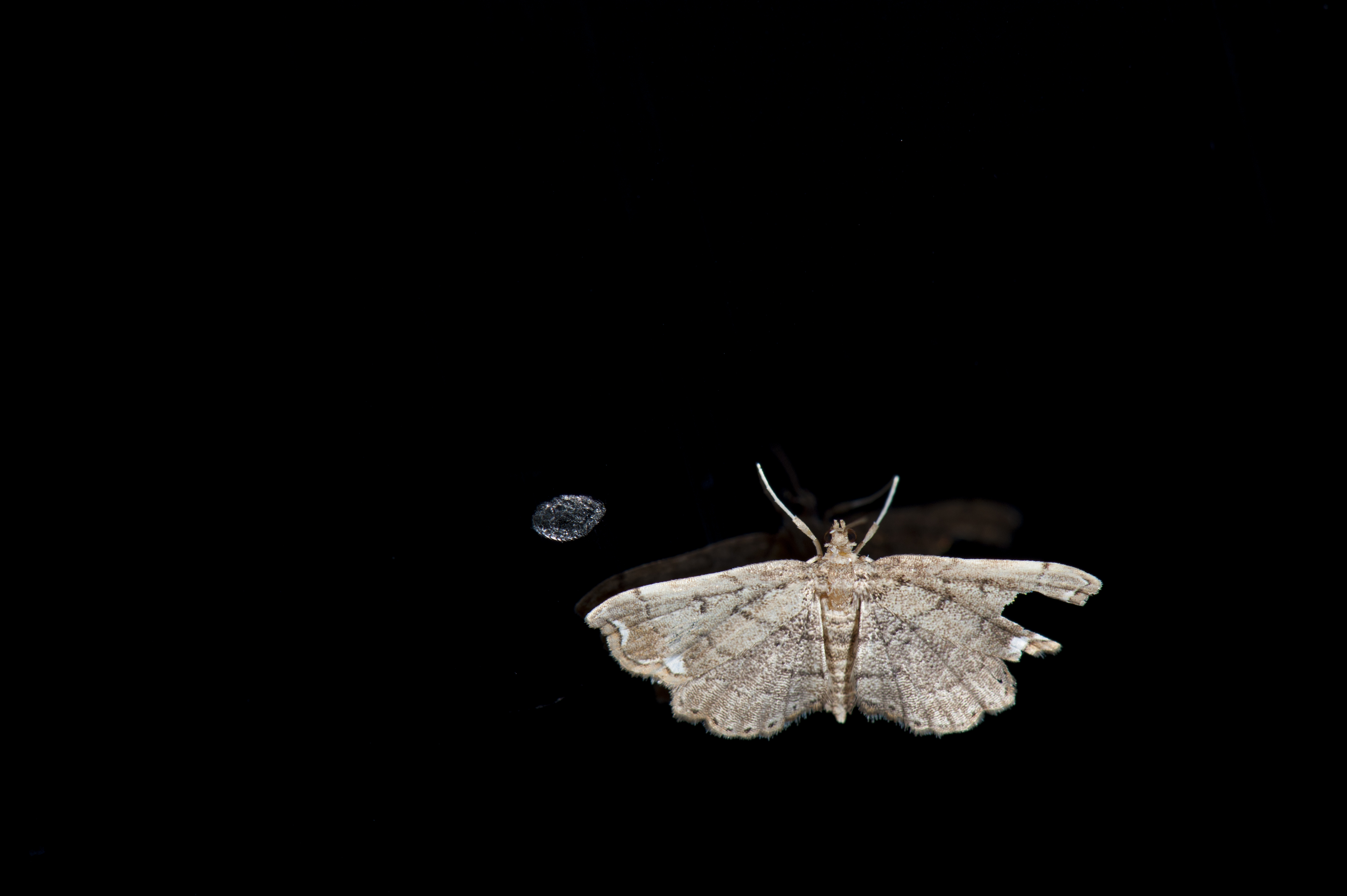
- Neomusotima fuscolinealis

Scientific classification
- Kingdom: Animalia
- Phylum: Arthropoda
- Class: Insecta
- Order: Lepidoptera
- Family: Crambidae
- Genus: Neomusotima
- Species: N. fuscolinealis

Binomial name
- Neomusotima fuscolinealis Yoshiyasu, 1985

= Neomusotima fuscolinealis =

Species of moth

Neomusotima fuscolinealis is a moth in the family Crambidae. It was described by Yoshiyasu in 1985. It is found in Japan and Hong Kong. The species was studied as a potential biological control agent for Lygodium japonicum in the United States, but the species was deemed unsuitable since it also fed on the native species Lygodium palmatum.

The wingspan is 6–10 mm.

The larvae feed on Lygodium japonicum.
