= Neomusotima =

Scientific classification
- Kingdom: Animalia
- Phylum: Arthropoda
- Clade: Pancrustacea
- Class: Insecta
- Order: Lepidoptera
- Family: Crambidae
- Subfamily: Musotiminae
- Genus: Neomusotima; Yoshiyasu, 1985

Genus of moths

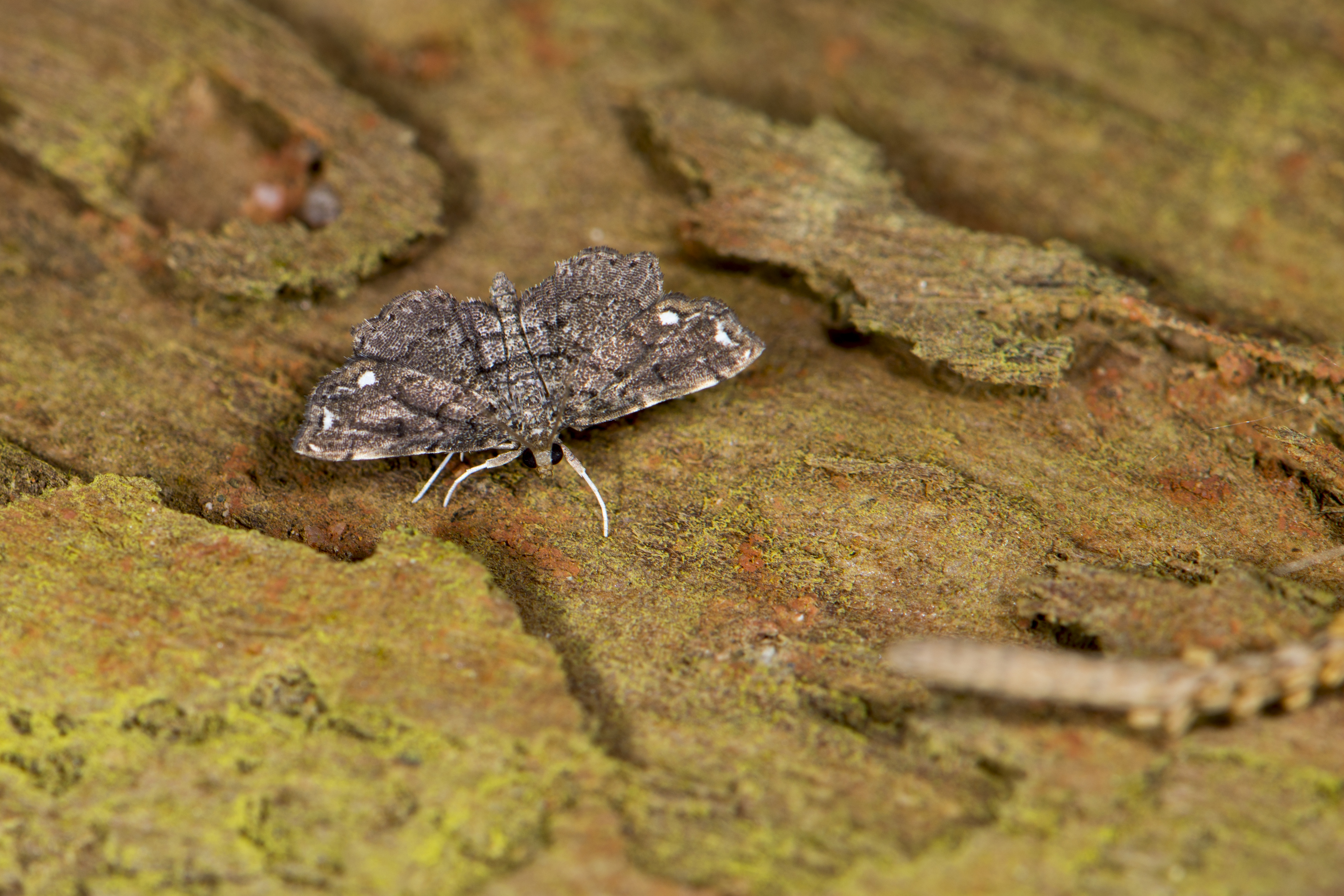
Image of a Neomusotima

Neomusotima is a genus of moths of the family Crambidae.

== Species ==
- Neomusotima conspurcatalis (Warren, 1896)
- Neomusotima fuscolinealis Yoshiyasu, 1985
