= Chrysendeton nigrescens =

Scientific classification
- Kingdom: Animalia
- Phylum: Arthropoda
- Clade: Pancrustacea
- Class: Insecta
- Order: Lepidoptera
- Family: Crambidae
- Genus: Chrysendeton
- Species: C. nigrescens

Binomial name
- Chrysendeton nigrescens Heppner, 1991

Species of moth

Chrysendeton nigrescens is a species of moth in the family Crambidae. It is found on North America, where it has been recorded from Alabama, Florida and Georgia. The habitat consists of pitcher plant bogs.

Adults have been recorded on wing from May to June and from August to September.
