= Odilla (moth) =

Scientific classification
- Kingdom: Animalia
- Phylum: Arthropoda
- Class: Insecta
- Order: Lepidoptera
- Family: Crambidae
- Subfamily: Musotiminae
- Genus: Odilla; Schaus, 1940
- Species: O. noralis

Binomial name
- Odilla noralis Schaus, 1940

Genus of moths

Odilla is a genus of moths of the family Crambidae. It contains only one species, Odilla noralis, which is found in Puerto Rico and Cuba.
