= Undulambia vitrinalis =

Scientific classification
- Domain: Eukaryota
- Kingdom: Animalia
- Phylum: Arthropoda
- Class: Insecta
- Order: Lepidoptera
- Family: Crambidae
- Genus: Undulambia
- Species: U. vitrinalis

Binomial name
- Undulambia vitrinalis (C. Felder, R. Felder & Rogenhofer, 1875)

Synonyms
- Nymphula vitrinalis C. Felder, R. Felder & Rogenhofer, 1875

Species of moth

Undulambia vitrinalis is a moth in the family Crambidae. It was described by Cajetan von Felder, Rudolf Felder and Alois Friedrich Rogenhofer in 1875. It is found in Guyana.
