= Undulambia =

Scientific classification
- Domain: Eukaryota
- Kingdom: Animalia
- Phylum: Arthropoda
- Class: Insecta
- Order: Lepidoptera
- Family: Crambidae
- Subfamily: Musotiminae
- Genus: Undulambia; Lange, 1956

Genus of moths

Undulambia is a genus of moths of the family Crambidae.

== Species ==
- Undulambia albitessellalis
- Undulambia arnoulalis
- Undulambia asaphalis
- Undulambia cantiusalis (Schaus, 1924)
- Undulambia cymialis (Hampson, 1907)
- Undulambia dendalis
- Undulambia electrale (Dyar, 1914)
- Undulambia flavicostalis
- Undulambia fovecosta
- Undulambia fulvicolor
- Undulambia fulvitinctalis (Hampson, 1897)
- Undulambia grisealis (Hampson, 1906)
- Undulambia hemigrammalis
- Undulambia intortalis
- Undulambia jonesalis
- Undulambia leucocymalis (Hampson, 1906)
- Undulambia leucostictalis
- Undulambia lindbladi B. Landry in Landry & Roque-Albelo, 2006
- Undulambia marconalis
- Undulambia niveiplagalis (Hampson, 1917)
- Undulambia oedizonalis (Hampson, 1906)
- Undulambia perornatalis (Schaus, 1912)
- Undulambia phaeochroalis (Hampson, 1906)
- Undulambia polystichalis
- Undulambia rarissima Munroe, 1972
- Undulambia semilunalis
- Undulambia striatalis (Dyar, 1906)
- Undulambia symphorasalis (Schaus, 1924)
- Undulambia tigrinale
- Undulambia vitrinalis (C. Felder, R. Felder & Rogenhofer, 1875)
