= Undulambia jonesalis =

Scientific classification
- Domain: Eukaryota
- Kingdom: Animalia
- Phylum: Arthropoda
- Class: Insecta
- Order: Lepidoptera
- Family: Crambidae
- Genus: Undulambia
- Species: U. jonesalis

Binomial name
- Undulambia jonesalis (Schaus, 1906)

Synonyms
- Cymoriza jonesalis Schaus, 1906; Ambia jonesalis

Species of moth

Undulambia jonesalis is a moth in the family Crambidae. It is found in Brazil (São Paulo).
