= Usingeriessa =

Scientific classification
- Kingdom: Animalia
- Phylum: Arthropoda
- Class: Insecta
- Order: Lepidoptera
- Family: Crambidae
- Subfamily: Acentropinae
- Genus: Usingeriessa; Lange, 1956

Genus of moths

Usingeriessa is a genus of moths of the family Crambidae.

== Species ==
- Usingeriessa brunneosuffusa (Hampson, 1917)
- Usingeriessa brunnildalis (Dyar, 1906)
- Usingeriessa decoralis (Dognin, 1905)
- Usingeriessa hemilitha (Meyrick, 1936)
- Usingeriessa nigrifusalis (Dognin, 1911)
- Usingeriessa onyxalis (Hampson, 1897)
- Usingeriessa psalmoidalis (Schaus, 1924)
- Usingeriessa sinitalis (Schaus, 1906)
- Usingeriessa symphonalis (Dyar, 1914)
- Usingeriessa tamanalis (Schaus, 1924)
- Usingeriessa trespasalis (Dyar, 1926)
