= Undulambia symphorasalis =

Scientific classification
- Domain: Eukaryota
- Kingdom: Animalia
- Phylum: Arthropoda
- Class: Insecta
- Order: Lepidoptera
- Family: Crambidae
- Genus: Undulambia
- Species: U. symphorasalis

Binomial name
- Undulambia symphorasalis (Schaus, 1924)

Synonyms
- Ambia symphorasalis Schaus, 1924

Species of moth

Undulambia symphorasalis is a moth in the family Crambidae. It was described by William Schaus in 1924. It is found in Guatemala.

The wingspan is about 18 mm. The forewings are tawny olive with white markings. The hindwings are suffused with mikado brown up to the postmedial line. There is a little white at the base. The antemedial white fascia are edged with fuscous and there is a black point at the end of the cell.
