= Undulambia leucostictalis =

Scientific classification
- Kingdom: Animalia
- Phylum: Arthropoda
- Class: Insecta
- Order: Lepidoptera
- Family: Crambidae
- Genus: Undulambia
- Species: U. leucostictalis

Binomial name
- Undulambia leucostictalis (Hampson, 1895)

Synonyms
- Ambia leucostictalis Hampson, 1895

Species of moth

Undulambia leucostictalis is a moth in the family Crambidae. It was described by George Hampson in 1895 and is found in Grenada.
