= Undulambia niveiplagalis =

Scientific classification
- Kingdom: Animalia
- Phylum: Arthropoda
- Class: Insecta
- Order: Lepidoptera
- Family: Crambidae
- Genus: Undulambia
- Species: U. niveiplagalis

Binomial name
- Undulambia niveiplagalis (Hampson, 1917)

Synonyms
- Ambia niveiplagalis Hampson, 1917

Species of moth

Undulambia niveiplagalis is a moth in the family Crambidae. It was described by George Hampson in 1917. It is found in Peru.
