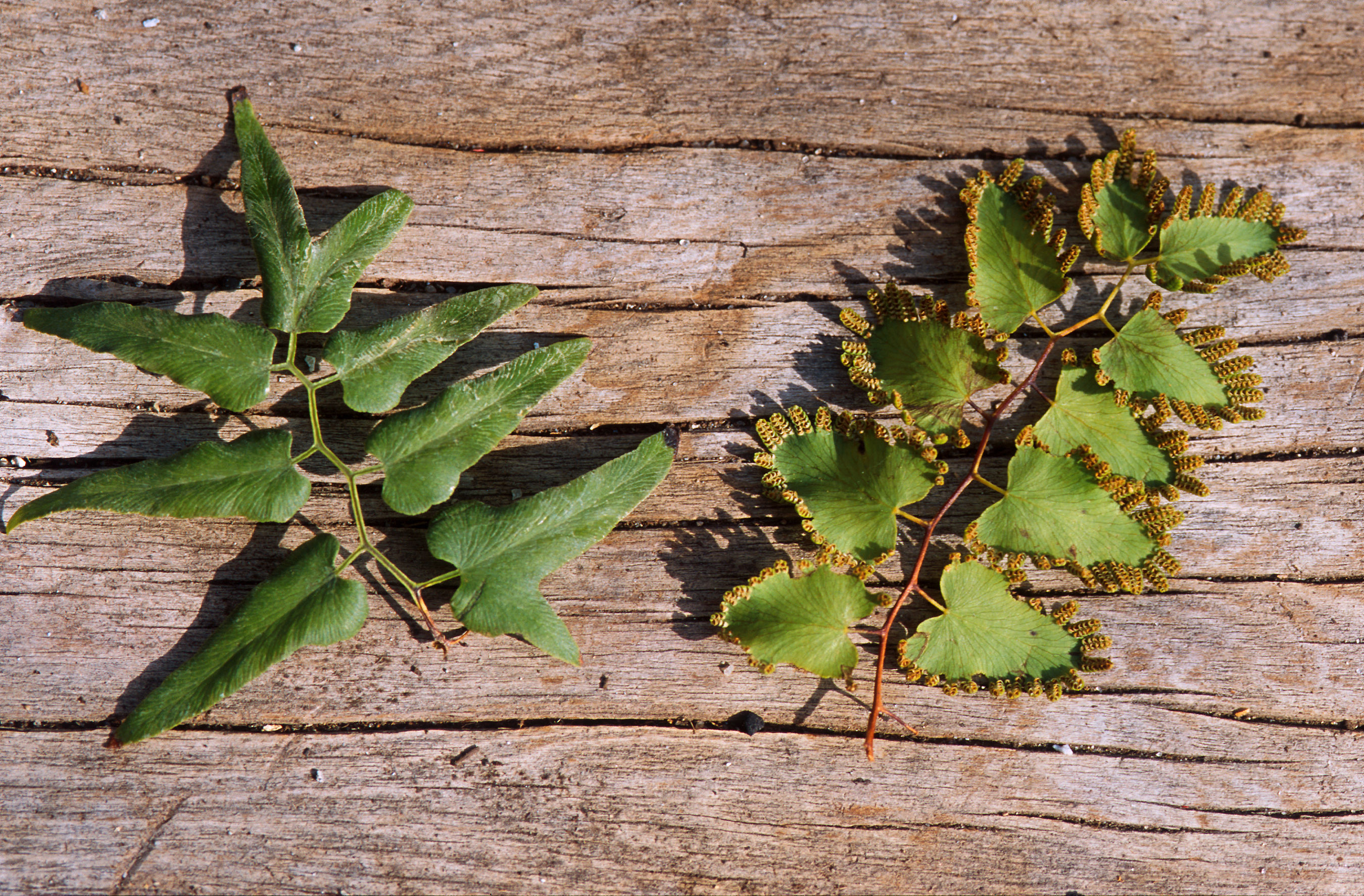
- Underside of spore-bearing leaflets, some leaflets produce spores; others do not.

Conservation status
- Least Concern (IUCN 3.1)

- Secure (NatureServe)

Scientific classification
- Kingdom: Plantae
- Clade: Tracheophytes
- Division: Polypodiophyta
- Class: Polypodiopsida
- Order: Schizaeales
- Family: Lygodiaceae
- Genus: Lygodium
- Species: L. microphyllum

Binomial name
- Lygodium microphyllum (Cav.) R.Br.
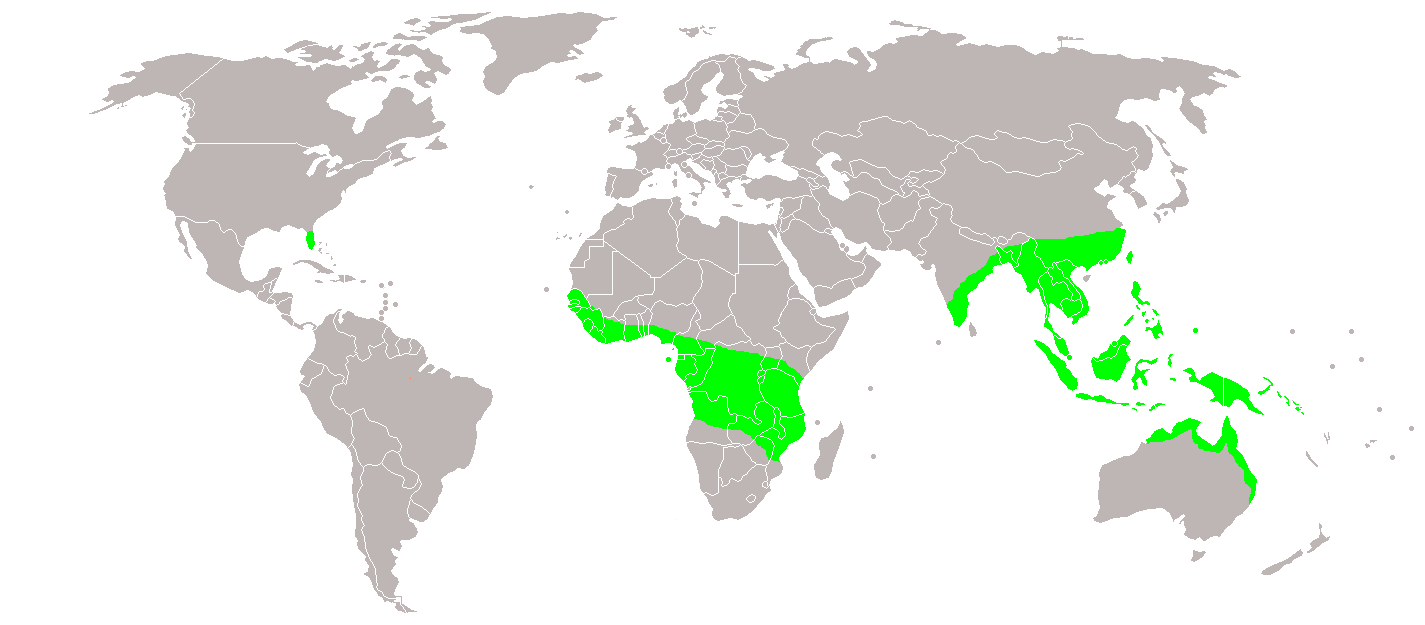
- Global distribution

Synonyms
- Lygodium scandens auct.; L. scandens (L.) Sw.; L. scandens var. intermedium Ces.; L. scandens var. microphyllum (Cav.) Luerss.; Ophioglossum filiforme Roxb.; Ugena microphylla Cav. (basionym)

= Lygodium microphyllum =

Species of fern

Lygodium microphyllum (commonly known as, variously, climbing maidenhair fern, Old World climbing fern, small-leaf climbing fern, or snake fern) is a climbing fern originating in tropical Africa, Southeast Asia, Melanesia and Australia. It is an invasive weed in Florida where it invades open forest and wetland areas. The type specimen was collected in the vicinity of Nabúa, on the island of Luzon in the Philippines by Luis Née.

== Distribution ==
Lygodium microphyllum is native to much of tropical Africa and South Africa; tropical Asia, including China, Ryukyu Islands of Japan; Australia; Fiji, the Mariana Islands and Caroline Islands.

Lygodium microphyllum has become naturalized in the Caribbean and South Florida.

== Effects on the environment ==
Lygodium microphyllum causes problems in the environments where it is invasive. The plant damages wetland ecosystems, harming endangered species. The ferns ability to grow up and over trees and shrubs and to form dense horizontal canopies allows it to cover whole communities of plants, reducing native plant diversity. Old World climbing fern can grow in many diverse ecosystems. Lygodium microphyllum poses problems for fires, both natural and man-made, because it can lead fire into the tree canopy, killing trees. The fern rapidly spread in South Florida's public conservation lands.

== Containment ==
Recently, the USDA approved the use of insects to keep the fern contained. Insects (Austromusotima camptozonale, Neomusotima conspurcatalis) and mites (Floracarus perrepae) have been released in several state parks to control the fern. Although some populations were devastated by a bout of cold weather, recently, reports of new activity have been made.

== Ethnobotany ==
Lygodium microphyllum has been used locally in folk medicine to treat skin ailments and problems, swelling and dysentery.

== Other uses ==
Lygodium microphyllum fibers (as well as other species of Lygodium), known as nito, are used to weave traditional salakot hats in the Philippines.
