= Undulambia fulvitinctalis =

Scientific classification
- Kingdom: Animalia
- Phylum: Arthropoda
- Class: Insecta
- Order: Lepidoptera
- Family: Crambidae
- Genus: Undulambia
- Species: U. fulvitinctalis

Binomial name
- Undulambia fulvitinctalis (Hampson, 1897)

Synonyms
- Ambia fulvitinctalis Hampson, 1897

Species of moth

Undulambia fulvitinctalis is a moth in the family Crambidae. It was described by George Hampson in 1897. It is found in Peru.
