= Undulambia lindbladi =

Scientific classification
- Kingdom: Animalia
- Phylum: Arthropoda
- Clade: Pancrustacea
- Class: Insecta
- Order: Lepidoptera
- Family: Crambidae
- Genus: Undulambia
- Species: U. lindbladi

Binomial name
- Undulambia lindbladi B. Landry & Roque-Albelo, 2006

Species of moth

Undulambia lindbladi is a moth of the family Crambidae. It is found on the Galapagos Islands. The species has been recorded from fern covered habitats.

The length of the forewings is 4.19–6.38 mm (0.16–0.25 in) for males and 4.81–6.25 mm (0.19–0.25 in) for females.

Larvae have been reared on Pteridium aquilinum var. arachnoideum. They mine the stem of their host plant.
