= Undulambia rarissima =

Scientific classification
- Domain: Eukaryota
- Kingdom: Animalia
- Phylum: Arthropoda
- Class: Insecta
- Order: Lepidoptera
- Family: Crambidae
- Genus: Undulambia
- Species: U. rarissima

Binomial name
- Undulambia rarissima Munroe, 1972

Species of moth

Undulambia rarissima is a moth in the family Crambidae. It was described by Eugene G. Munroe in 1972. It is found in North America, where it has been recorded from Florida.

The wingspan is about 13 mm. Adults are on wing from January to May and in September.

The larvae possibly feed on Polystichum species.
