= Undulambia arnoulalis =

Scientific classification
- Domain: Eukaryota
- Kingdom: Animalia
- Phylum: Arthropoda
- Class: Insecta
- Order: Lepidoptera
- Family: Crambidae
- Genus: Undulambia
- Species: U. arnoulalis

Binomial name
- Undulambia arnoulalis (Schaus, 1925)

Synonyms
- Ambia arnoulalis Schaus, 1925

Species of moth

Undulambia arnoulalis is a moth in the family Crambidae described by William Schaus in 1925. It is found in Mexico.

The wingspan is about 18 mm. The wings are thickly suffused with mikado and snuff brown.
