= Undulambia oedizonalis =

Scientific classification
- Kingdom: Animalia
- Phylum: Arthropoda
- Class: Insecta
- Order: Lepidoptera
- Family: Crambidae
- Genus: Undulambia
- Species: U. oedizonalis

Binomial name
- Undulambia oedizonalis (Hampson, 1906)

Synonyms
- Ambia oedizonalis Hampson, 1906

Species of moth

Undulambia oedizonalis is a moth in the family Crambidae. It was described by George Hampson in 1906. It is found in Jamaica.
