= Undulambia leucocymalis =

Scientific classification
- Kingdom: Animalia
- Phylum: Arthropoda
- Class: Insecta
- Order: Lepidoptera
- Family: Crambidae
- Genus: Undulambia
- Species: U. leucocymalis

Binomial name
- Undulambia leucocymalis (Hampson, 1906)

Synonyms
- Ambia leucocymalis Hampson, 1906

Species of moth

Undulambia leucocymalis is a moth in the family Crambidae. It was described by George Hampson in 1906. It is found in Jamaica.
