= Undulambia cymialis =

Scientific classification
- Kingdom: Animalia
- Phylum: Arthropoda
- Class: Insecta
- Order: Lepidoptera
- Family: Crambidae
- Genus: Undulambia
- Species: U. cymialis

Binomial name
- Undulambia cymialis (Hampson, 1907)

Synonyms
- Diathrausta cymialis Hampson, 1907

Species of moth

Undulambia cymialis is a moth in the family Crambidae. It was described by George Hampson in 1907. It is found in Brazil.
