= Undulambia dendalis =

Scientific classification
- Domain: Eukaryota
- Kingdom: Animalia
- Phylum: Arthropoda
- Class: Insecta
- Order: Lepidoptera
- Family: Crambidae
- Genus: Undulambia
- Species: U. dendalis

Binomial name
- Undulambia dendalis (H. Druce, 1896)

Synonyms
- Ambia dendalis H. Druce, 1896

Species of moth

Undulambia dendalis is a moth in the family Crambidae. It is found in Guatemala.
