= Undulambia fulvicolor =

Scientific classification
- Kingdom: Animalia
- Phylum: Arthropoda
- Class: Insecta
- Order: Lepidoptera
- Family: Crambidae
- Genus: Undulambia
- Species: U. fulvicolor

Binomial name
- Undulambia fulvicolor (Hampson, 1917)

Synonyms
- Oligostigma fulvicolor Hampson, 1917

Species of moth

Undulambia fulvicolor is a moth in the family Crambidae. It is found in Peru.
