= Undulambia marconalis =

Scientific classification
- Domain: Eukaryota
- Kingdom: Animalia
- Phylum: Arthropoda
- Class: Insecta
- Order: Lepidoptera
- Family: Crambidae
- Genus: Undulambia
- Species: U. marconalis

Binomial name
- Undulambia marconalis (Schaus, 1924)

Synonyms
- Ambia marconalis Schaus, 1924

Species of moth

Undulambia marconalis is a moth in the family Crambidae. It was described by William Schaus in 1924 and it is found in Peru.
