= Undulambia semilunalis =

Scientific classification
- Kingdom: Animalia
- Phylum: Arthropoda
- Class: Insecta
- Order: Lepidoptera
- Family: Crambidae
- Genus: Undulambia
- Species: U. semilunalis

Binomial name
- Undulambia semilunalis (Hampson, 1897)

Synonyms
- Ambia semilunalis Hampson, 1897; Cymoriza mimica Warren

Species of moth

Undulambia semilunalis is a moth in the family Crambidae. It was described by George Hampson in 1897 and it is found in Brazil.
