= Undulambia cantiusalis =

Scientific classification
- Domain: Eukaryota
- Kingdom: Animalia
- Phylum: Arthropoda
- Class: Insecta
- Order: Lepidoptera
- Family: Crambidae
- Genus: Undulambia
- Species: U. cantiusalis

Binomial name
- Undulambia cantiusalis (Schaus, 1924)

Synonyms
- Ambia cantiusalis Schaus, 1924

Species of moth

Undulambia cantiusalis is a moth in the family Crambidae. It was described by William Schaus in 1924. It is found in Peru.

The wingspan is about 15 mm. The wings are white, with light orange-yellow markings.
