= Undulambia striatalis =

Scientific classification
- Kingdom: Animalia
- Phylum: Arthropoda
- Class: Insecta
- Order: Lepidoptera
- Family: Crambidae
- Genus: Undulambia
- Species: U. striatalis

Binomial name
- Undulambia striatalis (Dyar, 1906)

Synonyms
- Ambia striatalis Dyar, 1906

Species of moth

Undulambia striatalis is a moth in the family Crambidae. It was described by Harrison Gray Dyar Jr. in 1906. It has been recorded in the US states of Alabama, Massachusetts, Louisiana, South Carolina, Florida and Maryland.

Adults are on wing from March to July.

The larvae probably feed on a fern species.
