= Undulambia hemigrammalis =

Scientific classification
- Kingdom: Animalia
- Phylum: Arthropoda
- Class: Insecta
- Order: Lepidoptera
- Family: Crambidae
- Genus: Undulambia
- Species: U. hemigrammalis

Binomial name
- Undulambia hemigrammalis (Hampson, 1917)

Synonyms
- Ambia hemigrammalis Hampson, 1917

Species of moth

Undulambia hemigrammalis is a moth in the family Crambidae. It is found in Peru.
