= Undulambia electrale =

Scientific classification
- Kingdom: Animalia
- Phylum: Arthropoda
- Class: Insecta
- Order: Lepidoptera
- Family: Crambidae
- Genus: Undulambia
- Species: U. electrale

Binomial name
- Undulambia electrale (Dyar, 1914)

Synonyms
- Oligostigma electrale Dyar, 1914

Species of moth

Undulambia electralis is a moth in the family Crambidae. It is found in Panama.
