= Undulambia albitessellalis =

Scientific classification
- Kingdom: Animalia
- Phylum: Arthropoda
- Class: Insecta
- Order: Lepidoptera
- Family: Crambidae
- Genus: Undulambia
- Species: U. albitessellalis

Binomial name
- Undulambia albitessellalis (Hampson, 1906)

Synonyms
- Ambia albitessellalis Hampson, 1906; Undulambia albitesselalis Munroe, 1995; Undulambia tessallalis

Species of moth

Undulambia albitessellalis is a moth in the family Crambidae. It is found in Jamaica.
