= Undulambia flavicostalis =

Scientific classification
- Kingdom: Animalia
- Phylum: Arthropoda
- Class: Insecta
- Order: Lepidoptera
- Family: Crambidae
- Genus: Undulambia
- Species: U. flavicostalis

Binomial name
- Undulambia flavicostalis (Hampson, 1917)

Synonyms
- Nymphula flavicostalis Hampson, 1917

Species of moth

Undulambia flavicostalis is a moth in the family Crambidae. It is found in Peru.
