= Chrysendeton divulsalis =

Scientific classification
- Kingdom: Animalia
- Phylum: Arthropoda
- Class: Insecta
- Order: Lepidoptera
- Family: Crambidae
- Genus: Chrysendeton
- Species: C. divulsalis

Binomial name
- Chrysendeton divulsalis (Walker, 1866)

Synonyms
- Cataclysta divulsalis Walker, 1866

Species of moth

Chrysendeton divulsalis is a species of moth in the family Crambidae. It was described by Francis Walker in 1866. It is found in Tefé, Brazil.
