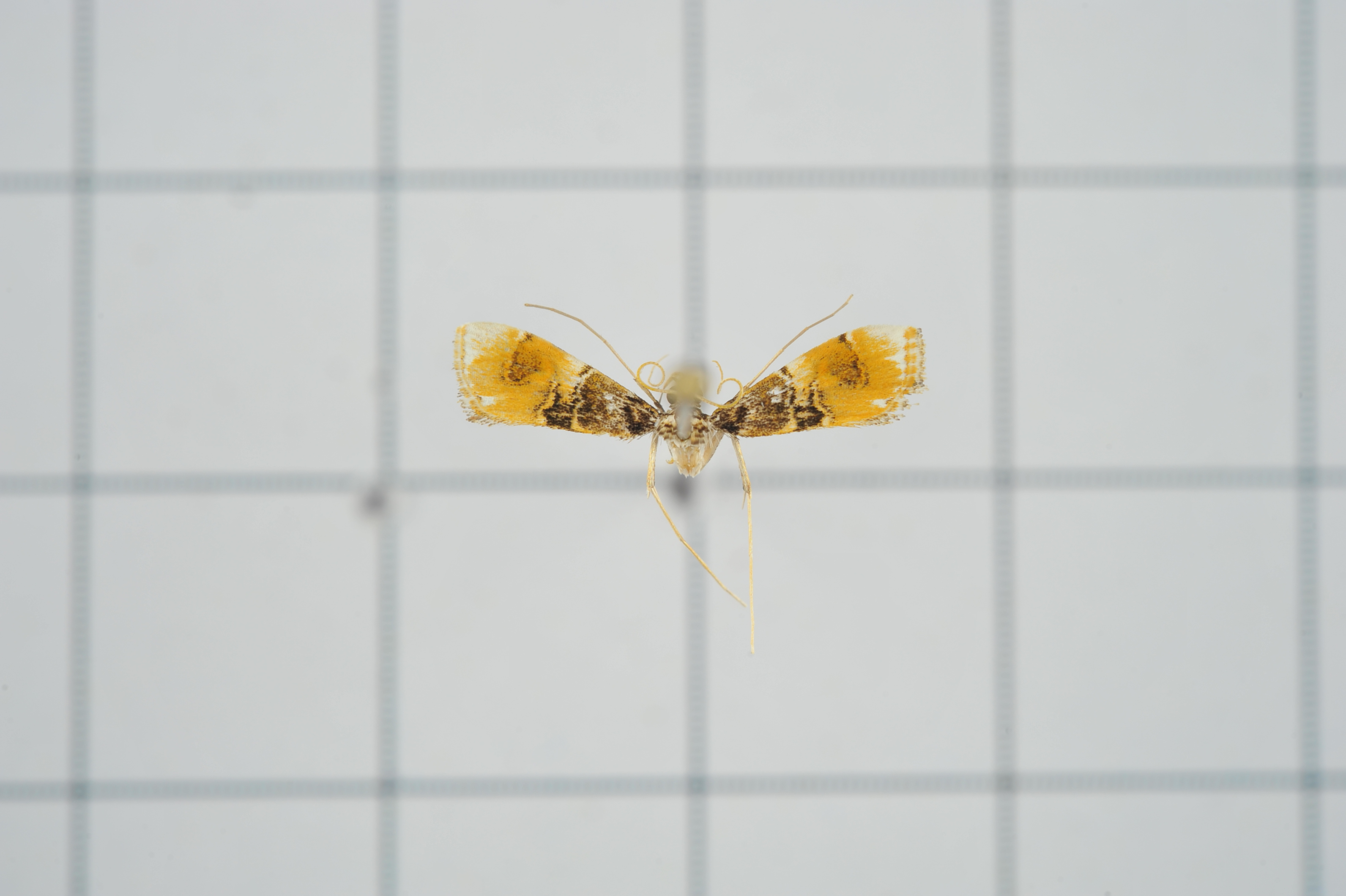

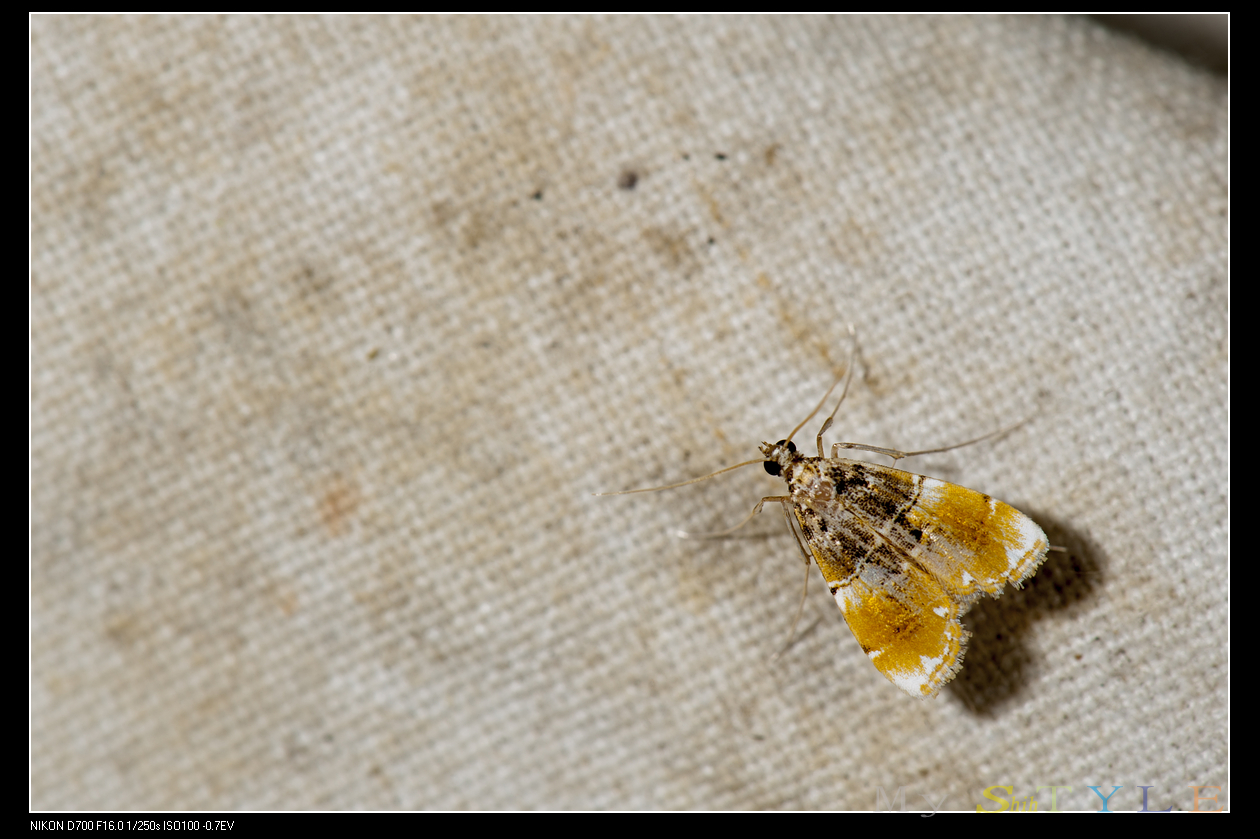

Scientific classification
- Kingdom: Animalia
- Phylum: Arthropoda
- Class: Insecta
- Order: Lepidoptera
- Family: Crambidae
- Genus: Thysanoidma
- Species: T. octalis

Binomial name
- Thysanoidma octalis Hampson, 1891

= Thysanoidma octalis =

Species of moth

Thysanoidma octalis is a moth in the family Crambidae. It was described by George Hampson in 1891. It is found in Taiwan and Assam, India.
