= Uinta (moth) =

Scientific classification
- Domain: Eukaryota
- Kingdom: Animalia
- Phylum: Arthropoda
- Class: Insecta
- Order: Lepidoptera
- Superfamily: Pyraloidea
- Family: Crambidae
- Genus: Uinta; Hulst, 1888
- Species: U. oreadella

Binomial name
- Uinta oreadella Hulst, 1888

Single-species genus of moths

Uinta is a monotypic moth genus of the family Pyralidae described by George Duryea Hulst in 1888. Its single species, Uinta oreadella, described in the same publication, is known from the US state of Colorado.
