= Undulambia asaphalis =

Scientific classification
- Domain: Eukaryota
- Kingdom: Animalia
- Phylum: Arthropoda
- Class: Insecta
- Order: Lepidoptera
- Family: Crambidae
- Genus: Undulambia
- Species: U. asaphalis

Binomial name
- Undulambia asaphalis (Schaus, 1924)

Synonyms
- Ambia asaphalis Schaus, 1924

Species of moth

Undulambia asaphalis is a moth in the family Crambidae described by William Schaus in 1924. It is found in Peru.

The wingspan is about 16 mm. The wings are white, with yellow-ocher markings, finely edged with black.
