= Undulambia polystichalis =

Scientific classification
- Domain: Eukaryota
- Kingdom: Animalia
- Phylum: Arthropoda
- Class: Insecta
- Order: Lepidoptera
- Family: Crambidae
- Genus: Undulambia
- Species: U. polystichalis

Binomial name
- Undulambia polystichalis Capps, 1965

Species of moth

Undulambia polystichalis, the leatherleaf fern borer moth, is a moth in the family Crambidae. It is found in Cuba and the south-eastern United States, where it has been recorded from Florida.

The wingspan is 12–15 mm. Adults are on wing from January to May and again from July to November.

The larvae feed on Rumohra adiantiformis.
