= Undulambia tigrinale =

Scientific classification
- Domain: Eukaryota
- Kingdom: Animalia
- Phylum: Arthropoda
- Class: Insecta
- Order: Lepidoptera
- Family: Crambidae
- Genus: Undulambia
- Species: U. tigrinale

Binomial name
- Undulambia tigrinale (Dyar, 1914)

Synonyms
- Oligostigma tigrinale Dyar, 1914

Species of moth

Undulambia tigrinale is a moth in the family Crambidae. It is found in Panama.
