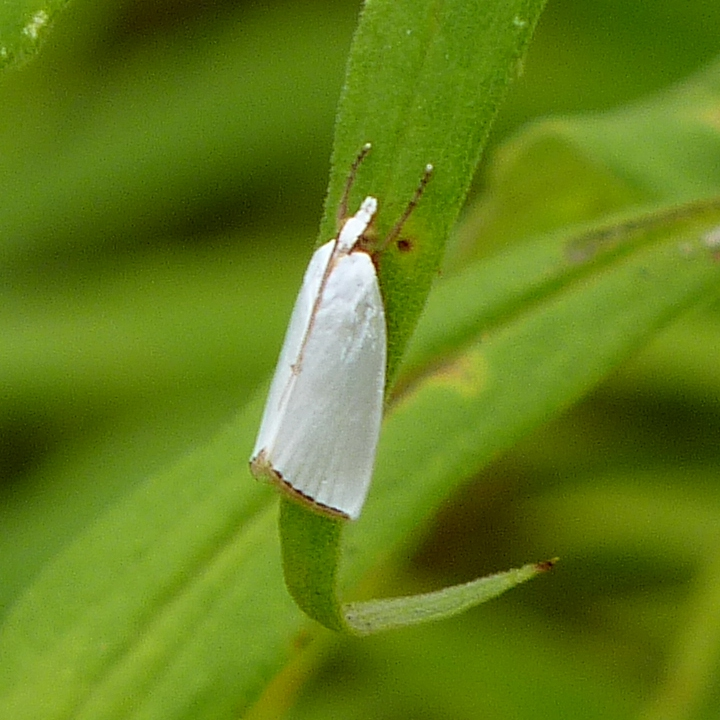
- Urola nivalis

Scientific classification
- Domain: Eukaryota
- Kingdom: Animalia
- Phylum: Arthropoda
- Class: Insecta
- Order: Lepidoptera
- Family: Crambidae
- Subfamily: Crambinae
- Tribe: Argyriini
- Genus: Urola; Walker, 1863

= Urola (moth) =

Genus of moths

Urola is a genus of moths of the family Crambidae.

== Species ==
- Urola fimbrialis (Dyar, 1914)
- Urola furvicornis (Zeller, 1877)
- Urola nivalis Drury, 1773
