= Undulambia perornatalis =

Scientific classification
- Domain: Eukaryota
- Kingdom: Animalia
- Phylum: Arthropoda
- Class: Insecta
- Order: Lepidoptera
- Family: Crambidae
- Genus: Undulambia
- Species: U. perornatalis

Binomial name
- Undulambia perornatalis (Schaus, 1912)

Synonyms
- Ambia perornatalis Schaus, 1912

Species of moth

Undulambia perornatalis is a moth in the family Crambidae. It was described by William Schaus in 1912. It is found in Costa Rica.
