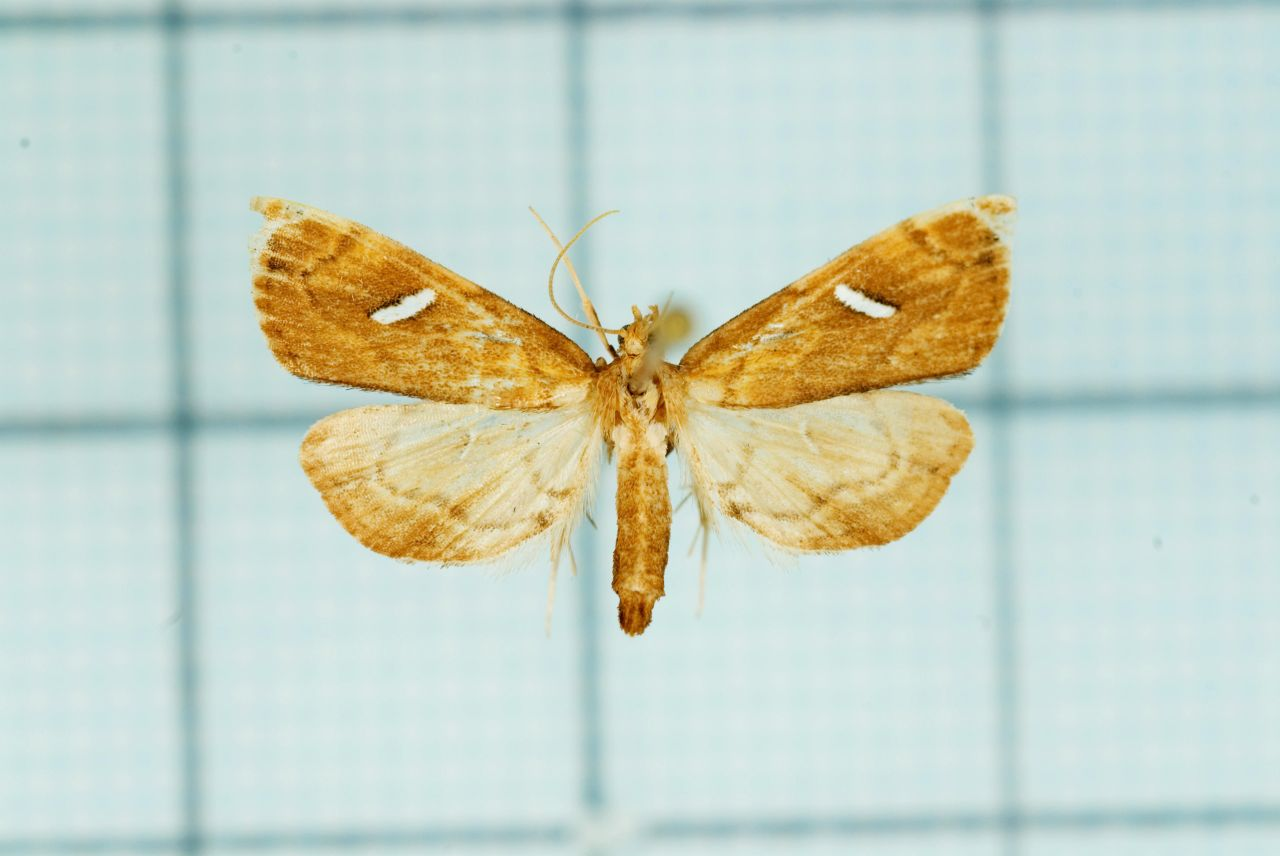

Scientific classification
- Kingdom: Animalia
- Phylum: Arthropoda
- Class: Insecta
- Order: Lepidoptera
- Family: Crambidae
- Subfamily: Midilinae
- Genus: Uthinia; Snellen, 1899
- Species: U. albisignalis

Binomial name
- Uthinia albisignalis (Hampson, 1896)

Synonyms
- Orphnophanes albisignalis Hampson, 1896; Uthinia albostrigalis Snellen, 1899; Uthinia albisingnalis

= Uthinia =

Genus of moths

Uthinia is a genus of moths of the family Crambidae. It contains only one species, Uthinia albisignalis, which is found in Asia, including India, Indonesia and Taiwan.
