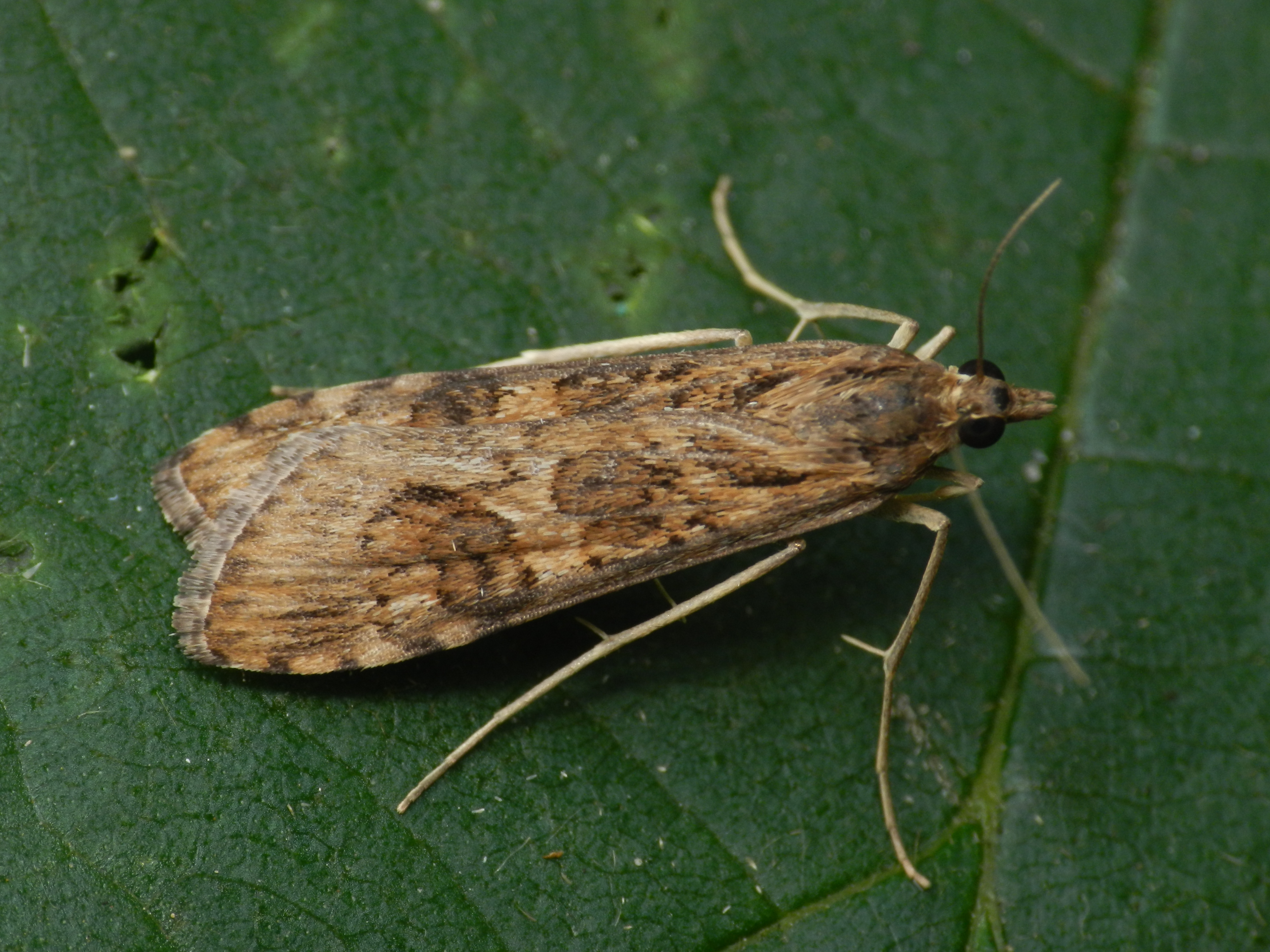
- Nomophila noctuella

Scientific classification
- Kingdom: Animalia
- Phylum: Arthropoda
- Clade: Pancrustacea
- Class: Insecta
- Order: Lepidoptera
- Family: Crambidae
- Subfamily: Spilomelinae
- Tribe: Nomophilini; Kuznetzov & Stekolnikov, 1979

= Nomophilini =

Tribe of moths

Nomophilini is a tribe of the species-rich subfamily Spilomelinae in the pyraloid moth family Crambidae. The tribe was erected by Vladimir Ivanovitsch Kuznetzov and Alexandr A. Stekolnikov in 1979.

The tribe currently comprises the following 24 genera, altogether containing 358 species:

- Arnia Guenée, 1849
- Ategumia Amsel, 1956
- Bocchoris Moore, 1885
- Crocidocnemis Warren, 1889 (= Somatania Möschler, 1890, Somatamia Kimball, 1965)
- Desmia Westwood, 1832 (= Aediodes Guenée, 1854, Arna Walker, 1856, Hyalitis Guenée, 1854)
- Diacme Warren, 1892
- Diasemia Hübner, 1825 (= Goniogramma Mann, 1854, Prodelia Doubleday, 1849)
- Diasemiodes Munroe, 1957
- Diasemiopsis Munroe, 1957 (= Diasemopsis Leraut, 1997)
- Diathrausta Lederer, 1863 (= Tripodaula Meyrick, 1933, Triplodaula Munroe, 1956)
- Epipagis Hübner, 1825 (= Epipages Hampson, 1918, Stenophyes Lederer, 1863)
- Mecyna Doubleday, 1849
- Mimophobetron Munroe, 1950
- Mimorista Warren, 1890
- Niphograpta Warren, 1892
- Nomophila Hübner, 1825 (= Macronomeutis Meyrick, 1936, Stenopteryx Duponchel, 1845)
- Nothomastix Warren, 1890
- Parapilocrocis Munroe, 1967
- Parathrausta Seizmair, 2024
- Pardomima Warren, 1890 (= Pachyparda E. L. Martin, 1955)
- Perisyntrocha Meyrick, 1894
- Pessocosma Meyrick, 1884
- Samea Guenée, 1854 (= Pterygisus Butler, 1886, Isopteryx Guenée, 1854)
- Sameodes Snellen, 1880
- Syngamia Guenée, 1854 (= Ochlia Hübner, 1823)
