= Hemopsis =

Scientific classification
- Domain: Eukaryota
- Kingdom: Animalia
- Phylum: Arthropoda
- Class: Insecta
- Order: Lepidoptera
- Family: Crambidae
- Tribe: Nomophilini
- Genus: Hemopsis; Kirti & Rose, 1987

Genus of moths

Hemopsis is a genus of moths of the family Crambidae. It was described in 1987 by Jagbir Singh Kirti and H. S. Rose, with H. dissipatalis as type species. The genus is placed in the Spilomelinae tribe Nomophilini and currently comprises five species that are found in the Indomalayan and Australasian realms.

== Species ==
- Hemopsis abstracta Yu & Du, 2025
- Hemopsis angustalis (Snellen, 1890)
- Hemopsis coalita Yu & Du, 2025
- Hemopsis dissipatalis (Lederer, 1863)
- Hemopsis heteroidea Yu & Du, 2025
