= Diathrausta plumbealis =

Scientific classification
- Kingdom: Animalia
- Phylum: Arthropoda
- Class: Insecta
- Order: Lepidoptera
- Family: Crambidae
- Genus: Diathrausta
- Species: D. plumbealis

Binomial name
- Diathrausta plumbealis (Warren, 1896)

Synonyms
- Syntomodora plumbealis Warren, 1896

Species of moth

Diathrausta plumbealis is a moth in the family Crambidae. It was described by Warren in 1896. It is found in India (Khasi Hills).
