= Diathrausta nerinalis =

Scientific classification
- Kingdom: Animalia
- Phylum: Arthropoda
- Class: Insecta
- Order: Lepidoptera
- Family: Crambidae
- Genus: Diathrausta
- Species: D. nerinalis

Binomial name
- Diathrausta nerinalis (Walker, 1859)

Synonyms
- Desmia nerinalis Walker, 1859

Species of moth

Diathrausta nerinalis is a moth in the family Crambidae. It was described by Francis Walker in 1859. It is found in Brazil.
