= Diasemiodes picalis =

Scientific classification
- Kingdom: Animalia
- Phylum: Arthropoda
- Class: Insecta
- Order: Lepidoptera
- Family: Crambidae
- Genus: Diasemiodes
- Species: D. picalis

Binomial name
- Diasemiodes picalis (Hampson, 1897)

Synonyms
- Ambia picalis Hampson, 1897

Species of moth

Diasemiodes picalis is a moth in the family Crambidae. It is found in Brazil (São Paulo).
