= Diathrausta yunquealis =

Scientific classification
- Kingdom: Animalia
- Phylum: Arthropoda
- Class: Insecta
- Order: Lepidoptera
- Family: Crambidae
- Genus: Diathrausta
- Species: D. yunquealis

Binomial name
- Diathrausta yunquealis Schaus, 1940

Species of moth

Diathrausta yunquealis is a moth in the family Crambidae. It was described by Schaus in 1940. It is found in Puerto Rico.
