= Nomophila heterospila =

Scientific classification
- Kingdom: Animalia
- Phylum: Arthropoda
- Class: Insecta
- Order: Lepidoptera
- Family: Crambidae
- Genus: Nomophila
- Species: N. heterospila

Binomial name
- Nomophila heterospila (Meyrick, 1936)

Synonyms
- Macronomeutis heterospila Meyrick, 1936; Nomophila heterospila equatorialis Munroe, 1973

Species of moth

Nomophila heterospila is a moth in the family Crambidae. It was described by Edward Meyrick in 1936. It is found in Bolivia and Ecuador.
