= Nomophila distinctalis =

Scientific classification
- Kingdom: Animalia
- Phylum: Arthropoda
- Class: Insecta
- Order: Lepidoptera
- Family: Crambidae
- Genus: Nomophila
- Species: N. distinctalis

Binomial name
- Nomophila distinctalis Munroe, 1973

Species of moth

Nomophila distinctalis is a moth in the family Crambidae. It was described by Eugene G. Munroe in 1973. It is found in Peru.
