= Diathrausta picata =

Scientific classification
- Kingdom: Animalia
- Phylum: Arthropoda
- Class: Insecta
- Order: Lepidoptera
- Family: Crambidae
- Genus: Diathrausta
- Species: D. picata

Binomial name
- Diathrausta picata (Butler, 1889)

Synonyms
- Danaga picata Butler, 1889

Species of moth

Diathrausta picata is a moth in the family Crambidae. It was described by Arthur Gardiner Butler in 1889. It is found in the north-western Himalayas and Australia.

The wingspan is about 17 mm. The wings are grey, with small blackish dots. The forewings are crossed by a black stripe and there is a small pure white spot in the cell, followed by a blackish marking. There is a white band, broken in two and bounded by a white-edged undulated discal black line. The hindwings have a marking at the end of the cell, connected by a black line. There is a short irregular white band from the costa.
