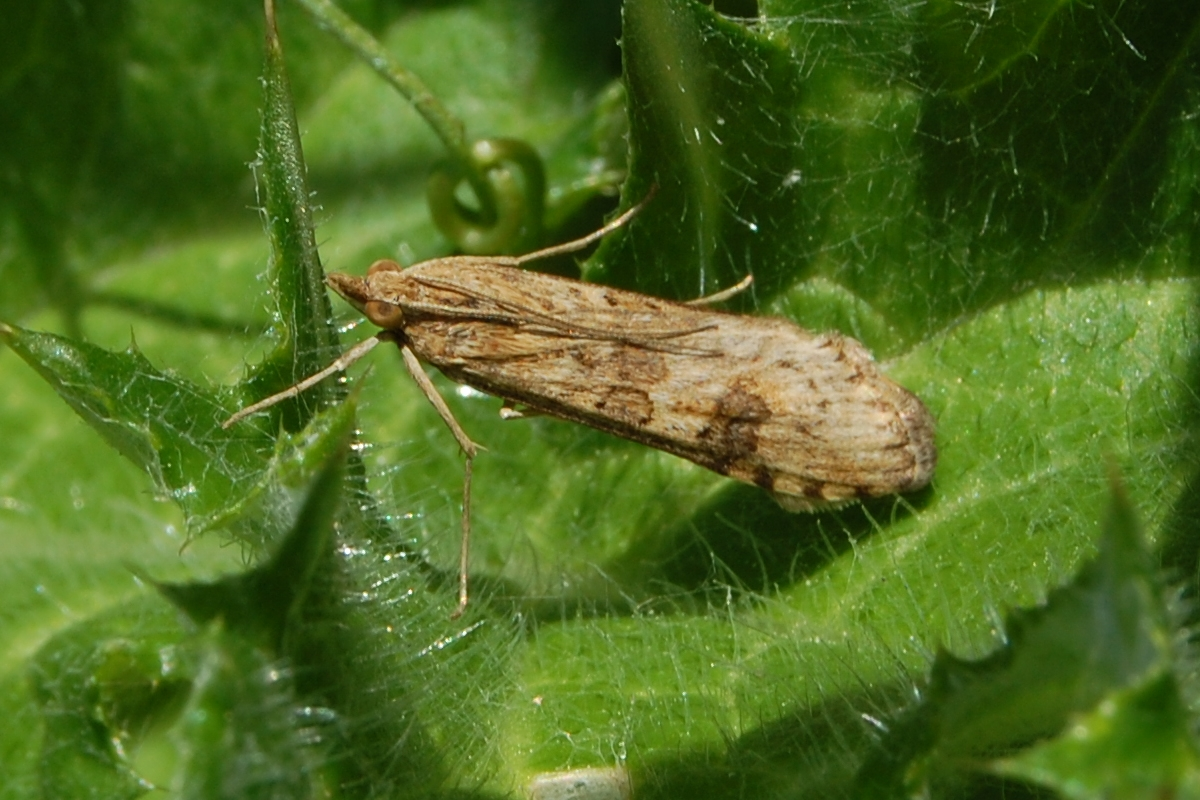

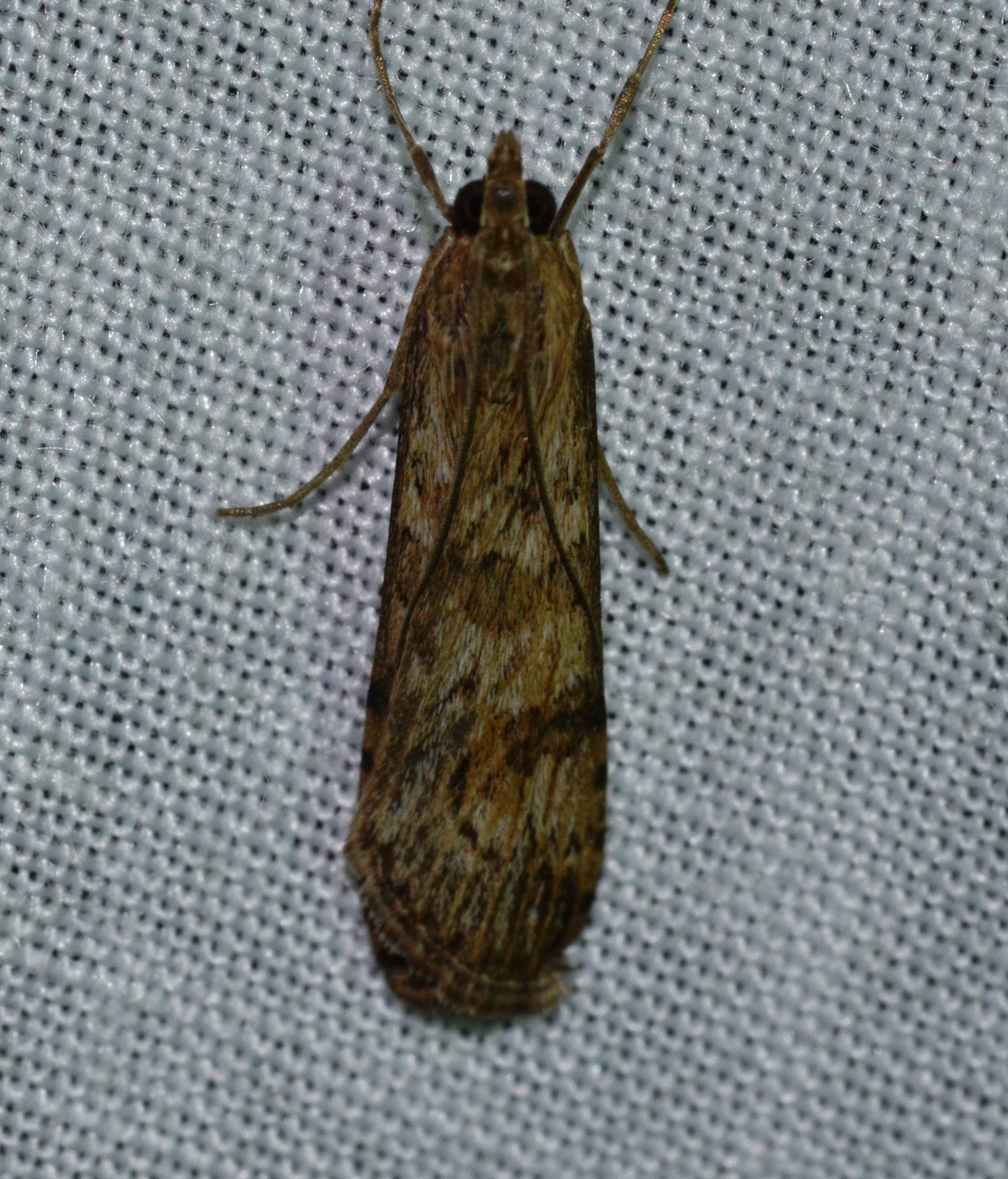

Scientific classification
- Kingdom: Animalia
- Phylum: Arthropoda
- Class: Insecta
- Order: Lepidoptera
- Family: Crambidae
- Genus: Nomophila
- Species: N. nearctica

Binomial name
- Nomophila nearctica Munroe, 1973

= Nomophila nearctica =

Species of moth

Nomophila nearctica, the lucerne moth, clover nomophila, false webworm, celery stalkworm or American celery webworm, is a moth of the family Crambidae. It is known from southern Canada and all of the United States, south to Mexico and the Neotropics.

The wingspan is 24–35 mm.

Adults are on wing from April to November in North America.

The larvae feed on celery, grasses, lucerne, Medicago sativa, Polygonum, Melilotus and various other low-growing herbaceous plants.
