= Diasemiopsis leodocusalis =

Scientific classification
- Kingdom: Animalia
- Phylum: Arthropoda
- Class: Insecta
- Order: Lepidoptera
- Family: Crambidae
- Genus: Diasemiopsis
- Species: D. leodocusalis

Binomial name
- Diasemiopsis leodocusalis (Walker, 1859)

Synonyms
- Lineodes leodocusalis Walker, 1859; Daulia leodocusalis

Species of moth

Diasemiopsis leodocusalis is a moth in the family Crambidae. It was described by Francis Walker in 1859. It is found in North America, where it has been recorded from Alabama, Florida, Georgia, Oklahoma and South Carolina. It has also been recorded from the West Indies to South America.

The wingspan is 8–12 mm. Adults are on wing from June to November in the northern part of the range and year-round in Florida.
