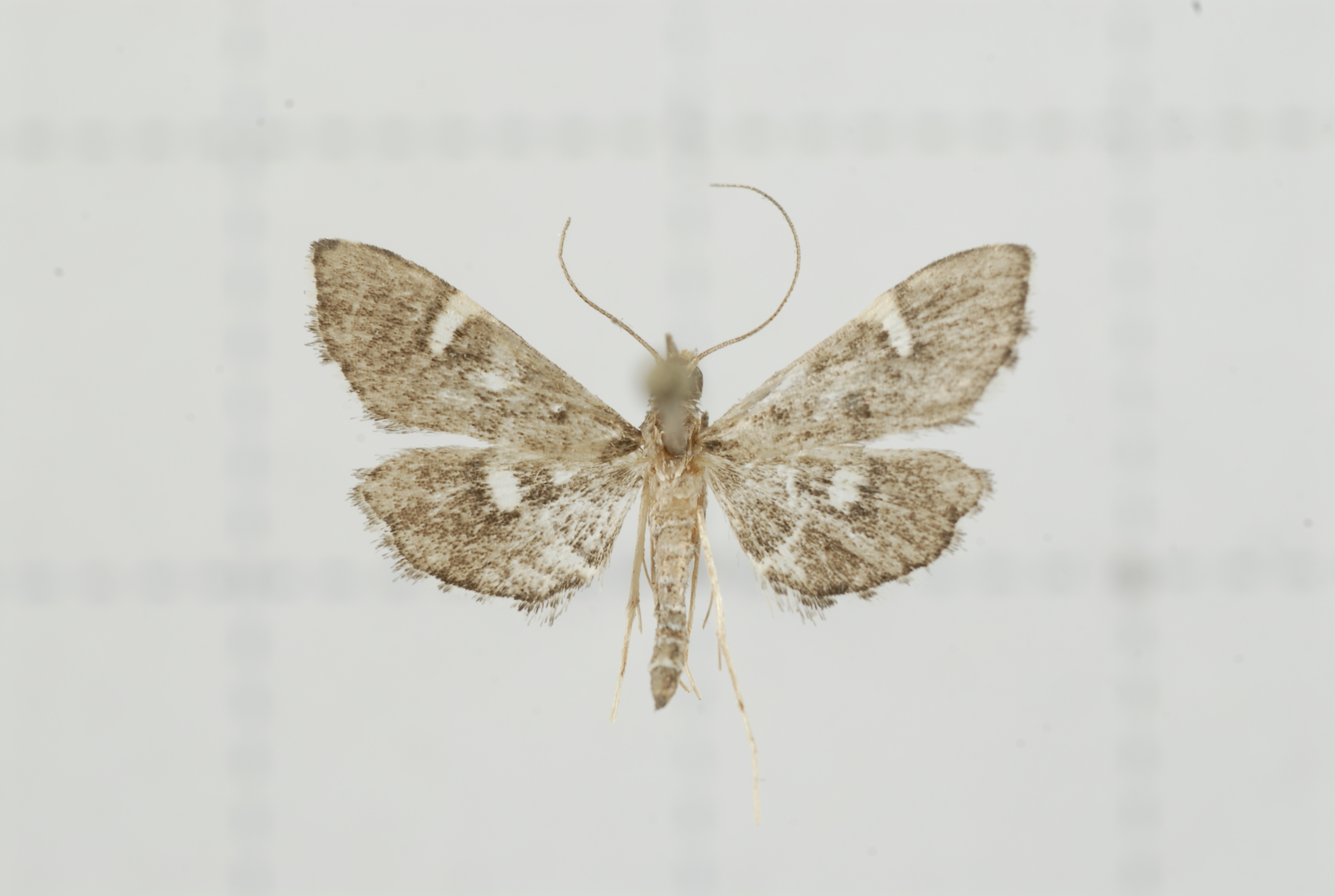

Scientific classification
- Kingdom: Animalia
- Phylum: Arthropoda
- Class: Insecta
- Order: Lepidoptera
- Family: Crambidae
- Genus: Diathrausta
- Species: D. brevifascialis

Binomial name
- Diathrausta brevifascialis (Wileman, 1911)

Synonyms
- Syngamia brevifascialis Wileman, 1911

= Diathrausta brevifascialis =

Species of moth

Diathrausta brevifascialis is a moth in the family Crambidae. It was described by Wileman in 1911. It is found in Japan and Taiwan.

The wingspan is about 18 mm.
