= Diathrausta ochrifuscalis =

Scientific classification
- Kingdom: Animalia
- Phylum: Arthropoda
- Class: Insecta
- Order: Lepidoptera
- Family: Crambidae
- Genus: Diathrausta
- Species: D. ochrifuscalis

Binomial name
- Diathrausta ochrifuscalis (Hampson, 1903)

Synonyms
- Endotricha ochrifuscalis Hampson, 1903

Species of moth

Diathrausta ochrifuscalis is a moth in the family Crambidae. It was described by George Hampson in 1903. It is found in the Khasi Hills of India.

The wingspan is about 20 mm. The forewings are brownish ochreous, irrorated (sprinkled) with fuscous. The costal and terminal areas are less strongly irrorated. There are traces of a curved ochreous antemedial line, and ochreous discoidal lunule and three small spots on the costa towards the apex. Both wings have traces of a pale sinuous subterminal line which is more distinct on the underside. There is also a fine black terminal line.
