= Crocidocnemis pellucidalis =

Scientific classification
- Kingdom: Animalia
- Phylum: Arthropoda
- Class: Insecta
- Order: Lepidoptera
- Family: Crambidae
- Genus: Crocidocnemis
- Species: C. pellucidalis

Binomial name
- Crocidocnemis pellucidalis (Möschler, 1890)

Synonyms
- Somatania pellucidalis Möschler, 1890; Syllepte pellucidalis; Sameodes suffusalis Hampson, 1899; Stenia samealis Dyar, 1914

Species of moth

Crocidocnemis pellucidalis is a moth in the family Crambidae. It was described by Heinrich Benno Möschler in 1890. It is found in Cuba, Puerto Rico, Panama, Costa Rica, Brazil and Argentina. It is also found in the southern United States, where it has been recorded from Florida and Texas.
