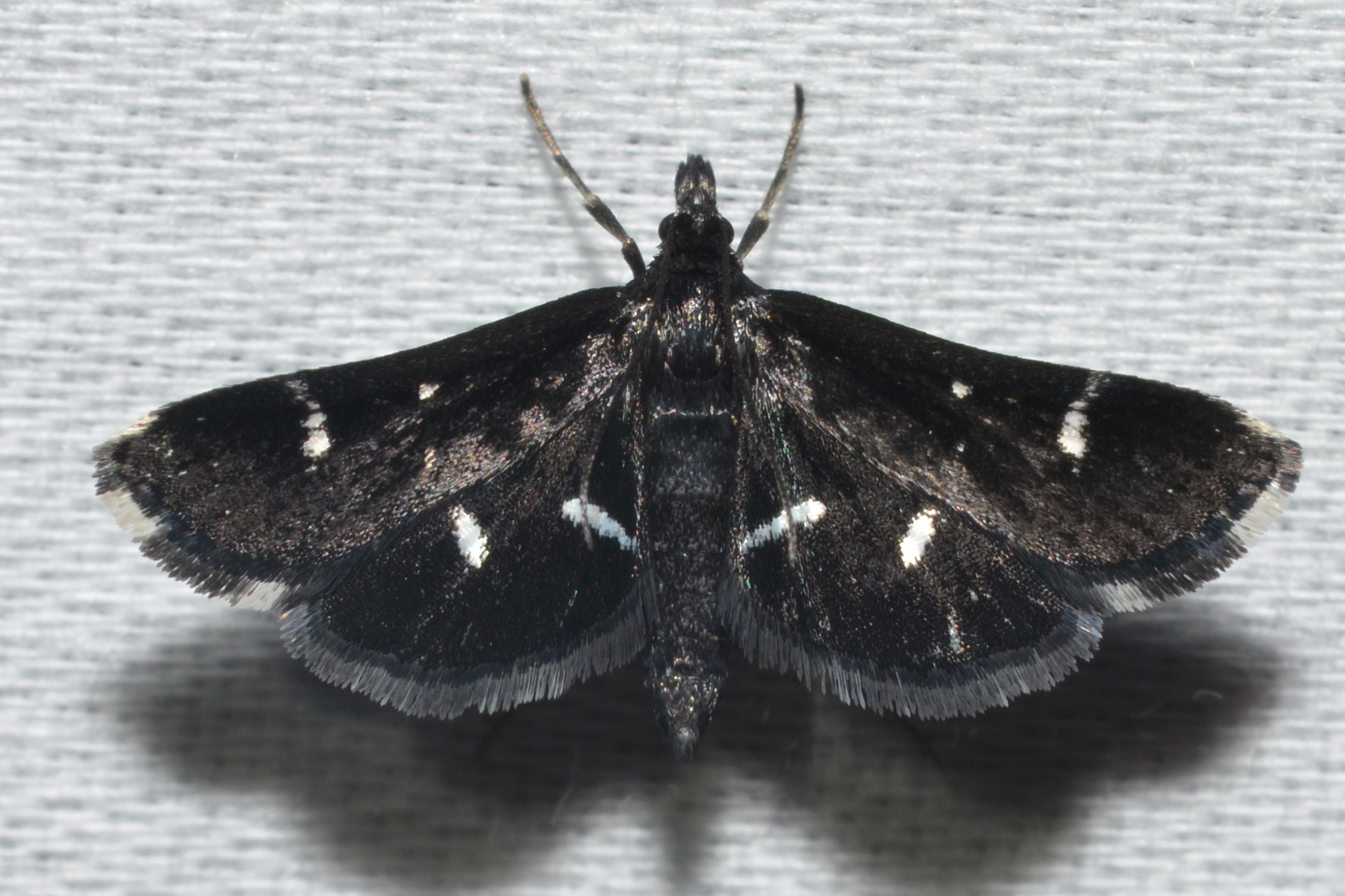
- Diasemiodes nigralis

Scientific classification
- Kingdom: Animalia
- Phylum: Arthropoda
- Clade: Pancrustacea
- Class: Insecta
- Order: Lepidoptera
- Family: Crambidae
- Genus: Diasemiodes
- Species: D. nigralis

Binomial name
- Diasemiodes nigralis (Fernald, 1892)

Synonyms
- Pyrausta nigralis Fernald, 1892

= Diasemiodes nigralis =

Species of moth

Diasemiodes nigralis is a moth in the family Crambidae. It was described by Charles H. Fernald in 1892. It is found in North America, where it has been recorded from Florida to Texas, with strays north to at least Michigan and Maryland.

The wingspan is about 18 mm. The wings are black. The outer line is represented by a nearly straight, snow-white stripe and a spot on the fold near the outer third of the hindmargin below a similar spot on the end of the cell. The hindwings have a small white spot at the base and another beyond the cell. There is an oblique stripe extending up from the anal angle. Adults are on wing from May to October in most of the range, but year round in Florida.
