= Parathrausta =

Scientific classification
- Kingdom: Animalia
- Phylum: Arthropoda
- Class: Insecta
- Order: Lepidoptera
- Superfamily: Pyraloidea
- Family: Crambidae
- Subfamily: Spilomelinae
- Tribe: Nomophilini
- Genus: Parathrausta; Seizmair, 2024

Genus of moths

Parathrausta is a genus of moths of the species-rich subfamily Spilomelinae in the family Crambidae.

The species of Parathrausta seem to be distributed in the drier savannah belt south of the Sahara and continuing in the southern Arabian Peninsula.

== Species ==
- Parathrausta contrastalis Maes, 2025
- Parathrausta internervalis Seizmair, 2024 (type species)
- Parathrausta nigerstigmalis Maes, 2025
