= Diathrausta cacalis =

Scientific classification
- Kingdom: Animalia
- Phylum: Arthropoda
- Class: Insecta
- Order: Lepidoptera
- Family: Crambidae
- Genus: Diathrausta
- Species: D. cacalis

Binomial name
- Diathrausta cacalis Dyar, 1913

Species of moth

Diathrausta cacalis is a moth in the family Crambidae. It was described by Harrison Gray Dyar Jr. in 1913. It is found in Mexico.
