= Diathrausta reconditalis =

Recondite webworm moth

Scientific classification
- Kingdom: Animalia
- Phylum: Arthropoda
- Class: Insecta
- Order: Lepidoptera
- Family: Crambidae
- Genus: Diathrausta
- Species: D. reconditalis

Binomial name
- Diathrausta reconditalis (Walker, 1859)

Synonyms
- Hymenia reconditalis Walker, 1859; Diathrausta octomaculalis Fernald, 1887; Ediodes minualis Walker, [1866]

Species of moth

Diathrausta reconditalis, the recondite webworm moth, is a moth in the family Crambidae. It was described by Francis Walker in 1859. It is found in North America, where it has been recorded from Alabama, Arizona, Florida, Indiana, Kentucky, Maryland, Massachusetts, Mississippi, New Hampshire, New York, North Carolina, Ohio, Oklahoma, Ontario, South Carolina, Tennessee and West Virginia.

The wingspan is about 18 mm. The wings are dark brown or nearly black with greenish reflections. There are three white spots on the forewings.
