= Diathrausta ochreipennis =

Scientific classification
- Kingdom: Animalia
- Phylum: Arthropoda
- Class: Insecta
- Order: Lepidoptera
- Family: Crambidae
- Genus: Diathrausta
- Species: D. ochreipennis

Binomial name
- Diathrausta ochreipennis (Butler, 1886)

Synonyms
- Pterygisus ochreipennis Butler, 1886

Species of moth

Diathrausta ochreipennis is a moth in the family Crambidae. It was described by Arthur Gardiner Butler in 1886. It is found in Australia, where it has been recorded from Queensland and New South Wales. The habitat consists of sclerophyll forests.
