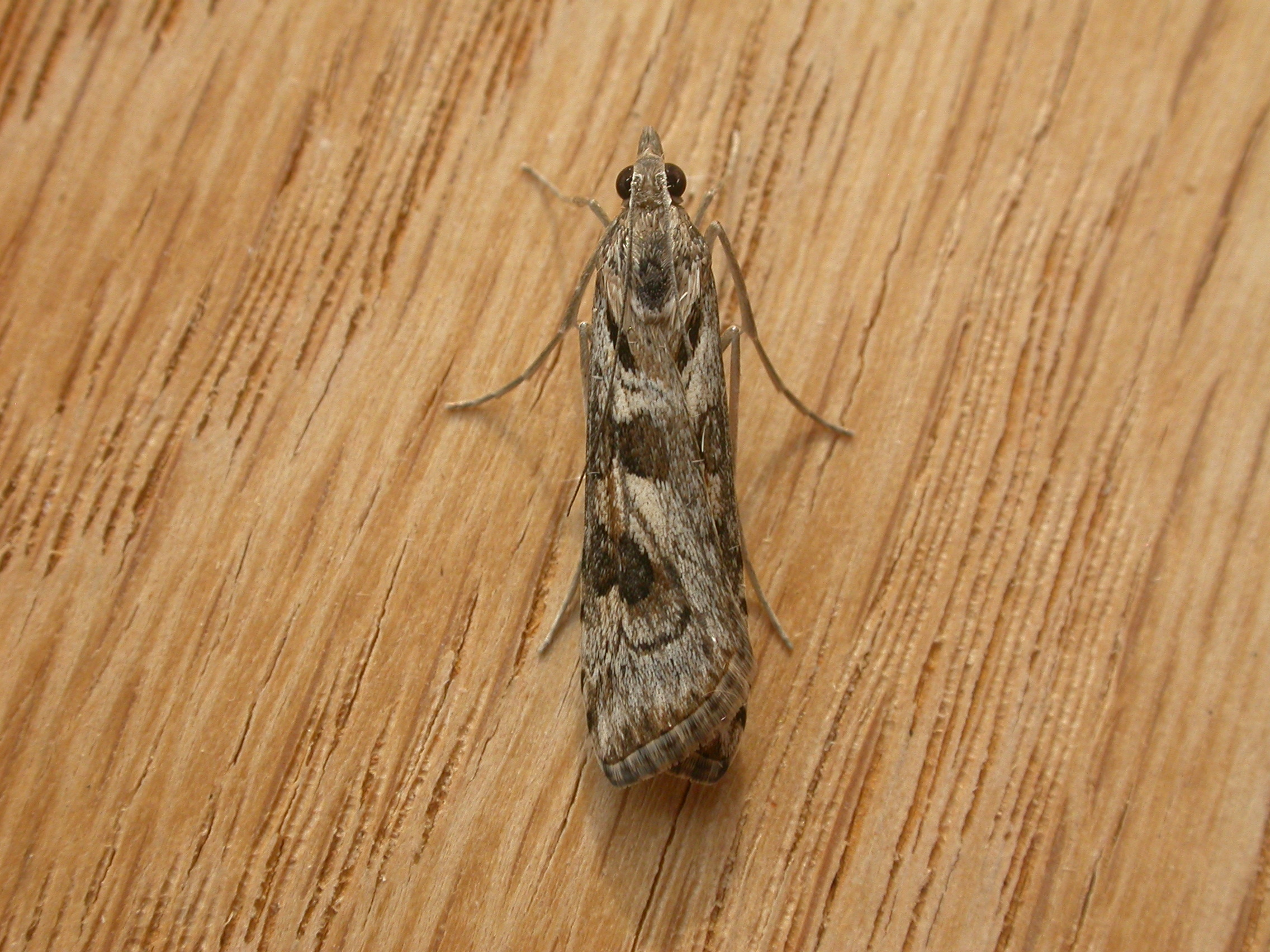

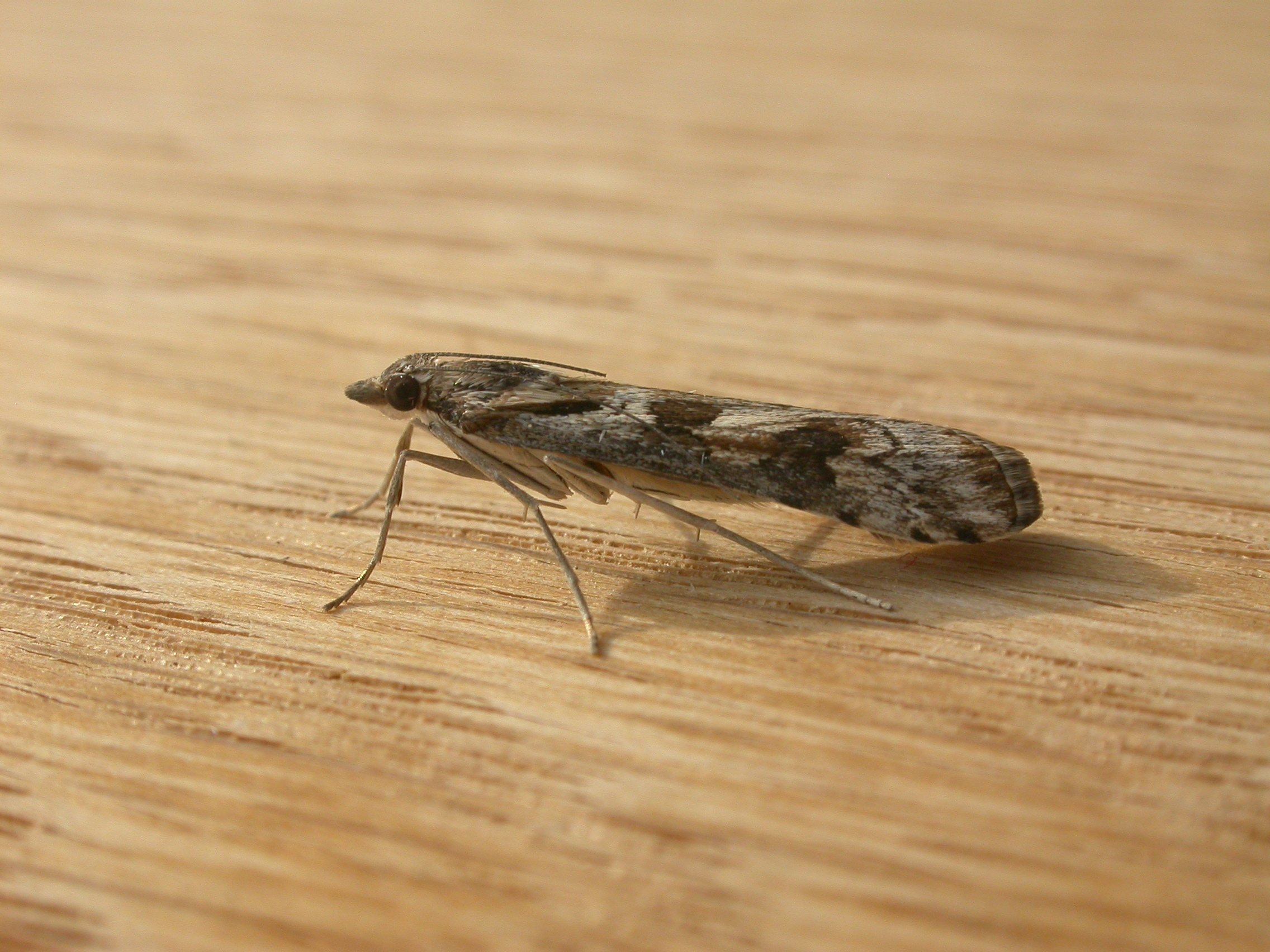

Scientific classification
- Kingdom: Animalia
- Phylum: Arthropoda
- Class: Insecta
- Order: Lepidoptera
- Family: Crambidae
- Genus: Nomophila
- Species: N. corticalis

Binomial name
- Nomophila corticalis (Walker, 1869)

Synonyms
- Stenopteryx corticalis Walker, 1869; Nomophila australica Munroe, 1973

= Nomophila corticalis =

Species of moth

Nomophila corticalis is a moth of the family Crambidae. It is known from Christmas Island and most of Australia, including the Australian Capital Territory, New South Wales, Queensland, South Australia and Victoria.

The wingspan is about 20 mm.

The larvae have been reared on leaves of Fabaceae, Asteraceae and Polygonaceae species.
