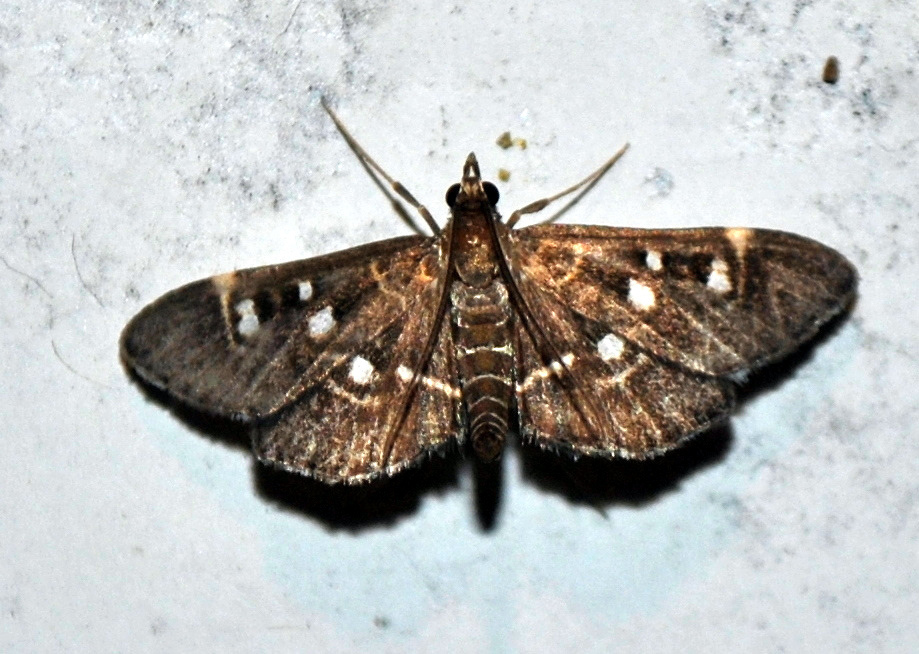

Scientific classification
- Kingdom: Animalia
- Phylum: Arthropoda
- Class: Insecta
- Order: Lepidoptera
- Family: Crambidae
- Genus: Diathrausta
- Species: D. harlequinalis

Binomial name
- Diathrausta harlequinalis Dyar, 1913

= Diathrausta harlequinalis =

Harlequin webworm moth

Species of moth

Diathrausta harlequinalis, the harlequin webworm moth, is a moth in the family Crambidae. It was described by Harrison Gray Dyar Jr. in 1913. It is found in North America in Mexico, Arizona, California, Colorado, Connecticut, Florida, Maryland, Massachusetts, Minnesota, New Mexico, North Carolina, Oklahoma, Ontario, Quebec, South Carolina, Tennessee and Texas.

The wingspan is 13 mm. Adults have been recorded from March to October.

== Subspecies ==
- Diathrausta harlequinalis harlequinalis
- Diathrausta harlequinalis amaura Munroe, 1956
- Diathrausta harlequinalis lauta Munroe, 1956
- Diathrausta harlequinalis montana Haimbach, 1915
