= Nomophila albisignalis =

Scientific classification
- Kingdom: Animalia
- Phylum: Arthropoda
- Class: Insecta
- Order: Lepidoptera
- Family: Crambidae
- Genus: Nomophila
- Species: N. albisignalis

Binomial name
- Nomophila albisignalis Hampson, 1913

Species of moth

Nomophila albisignalis is a moth in the family Crambidae. It was described by George Hampson in 1913. It is found in Kenya.
