= Diathrausta leucographa =

Scientific classification
- Kingdom: Animalia
- Phylum: Arthropoda
- Class: Insecta
- Order: Lepidoptera
- Family: Crambidae
- Genus: Diathrausta
- Species: D. leucographa

Binomial name
- Diathrausta leucographa Hampson, 1917

Species of moth

Diathrausta leucographa is a moth in the family Crambidae. It was described by George Hampson in 1917. It is found in New Guinea, where it has been recorded from the D'Entrecasteaux Islands (Goodenough Island).
