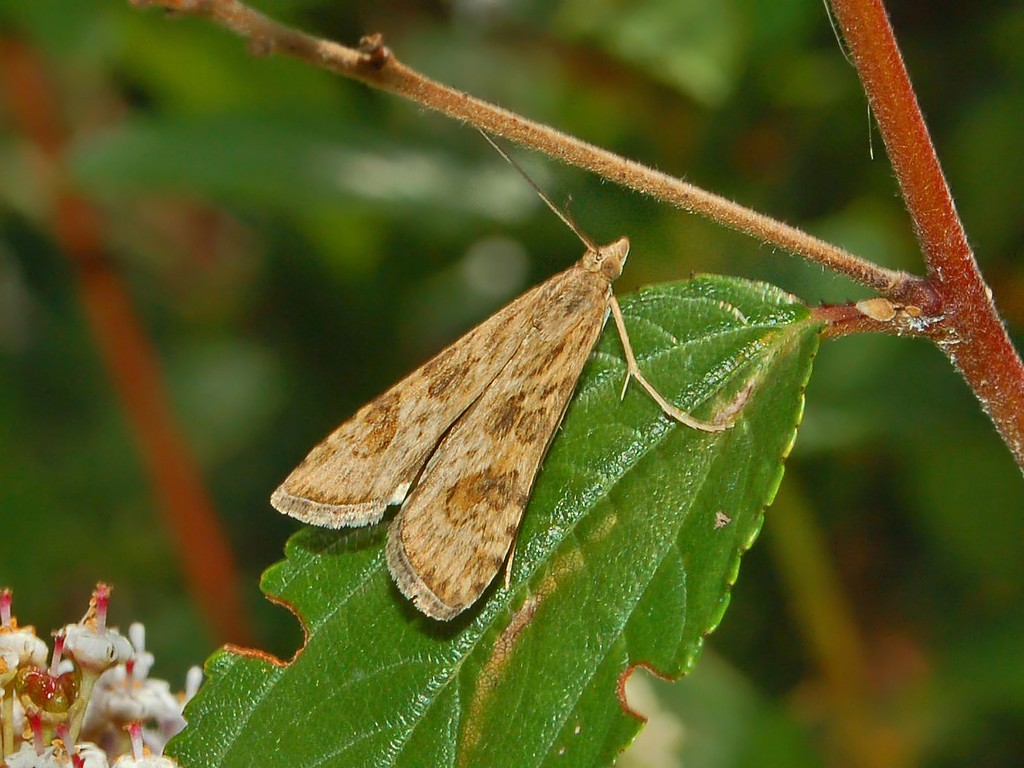
- Dorsal view

Scientific classification
- Kingdom: Animalia
- Phylum: Arthropoda
- Clade: Pancrustacea
- Class: Insecta
- Order: Lepidoptera
- Family: Crambidae
- Genus: Nomophila
- Species: N. noctuella

Binomial name
- Nomophila noctuella (Denis & Schiffermüller, 1775)

Synonyms
- Phalaena Tinea noctuella Denis & Schiffermüller, 1775; Nomophila noctualis Hampson, 1898; Nomophila incertalis Hübner, 1825; Pyralis hybridalis Hübner, 1796

= Nomophila noctuella =

Species of moth

Nomophila noctuella, the rush veneer, is a species of moth of the family Crambidae.

== Distribution ==
This species has a nearly cosmopolitan distribution (Europe, North Africa, Central Asia, Pakistan, North America). In Europe, it is a migratory species, travelling from southern Europe and North Africa to Northern Europe.

== Description ==
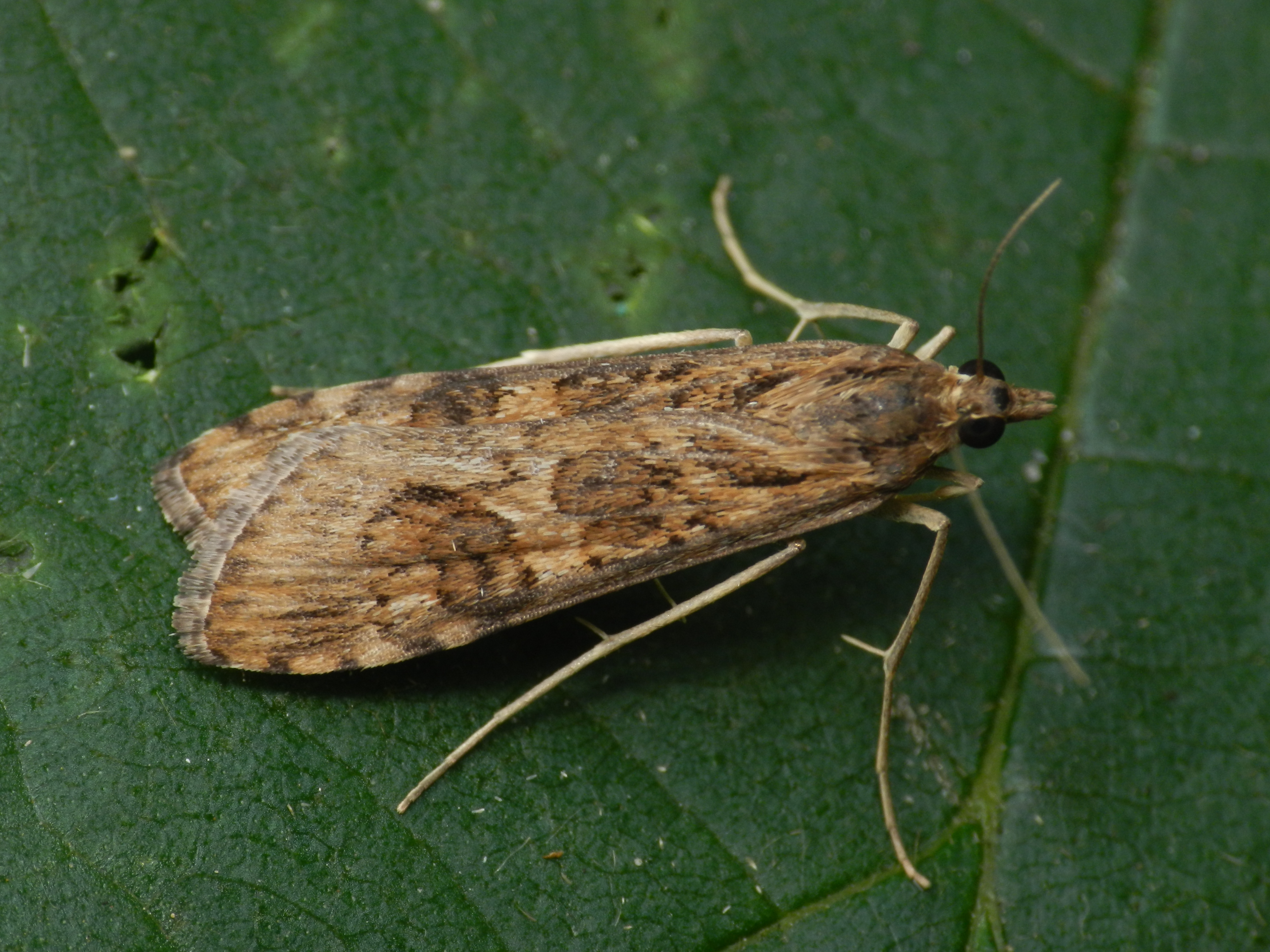
Nomophila noctuella

The wingspan is 26–32 mm. Forewings are very elongated and narrow. The basic color of the forewings is usually brown, with darker wide eight-shaped and reniform markings in the discal and postdiscal areas. Some dark brown spots are present close to the outer edge and to the apex. The hindwings are whitish with brown veins.

The mature larvae are gray green and spotted. They can reach a length of 15–20 millimetres (0.59–0.79 in).

== Biology ==
These moths fly from May to September depending on the location. They are attracted to light, and in Europe they are migratory. There are two to four generations per year.

The larvae feed on Trifolium, clover, Medicago, Polygonum aviculare, wheat, Vaccinium and various other grasses. They pupate in a cocoon amongst the leaves of the host plants or on a stone. The pupa hibernates.
