= Diathrausta stagmatopa =

Scientific classification
- Kingdom: Animalia
- Phylum: Arthropoda
- Class: Insecta
- Order: Lepidoptera
- Family: Crambidae
- Genus: Diathrausta
- Species: D. stagmatopa

Binomial name
- Diathrausta stagmatopa (Meyrick, 1933)

Synonyms
- Tripodaula stagmatopa Meyrick, 1933

Species of moth

Diathrausta stagmatopa is a moth in the family Crambidae described by Edward Meyrick in 1933. It is found in Argentina.
