= Diathrausta minutalis =

Scientific classification
- Kingdom: Animalia
- Phylum: Arthropoda
- Class: Insecta
- Order: Lepidoptera
- Family: Crambidae
- Genus: Diathrausta
- Species: D. minutalis

Binomial name
- Diathrausta minutalis (H. Druce, 1899)

Synonyms
- Diasemia minutalis H. Druce, 1899

Species of moth

Diathrausta minutalis is a moth in the family Crambidae. It was described by Herbert Druce in 1899. It is found in Mexico.
