= Diathrausta delicata =

Scientific classification
- Kingdom: Animalia
- Phylum: Arthropoda
- Class: Insecta
- Order: Lepidoptera
- Family: Crambidae
- Genus: Diathrausta
- Species: D. delicata

Binomial name
- Diathrausta delicata (Warren, 1896)

Synonyms
- Blepharomastix delicata Warren, 1896

Species of moth

Diathrausta delicata is a moth in the family Crambidae. It was described by Warren in 1896. It is found in French Guiana.
