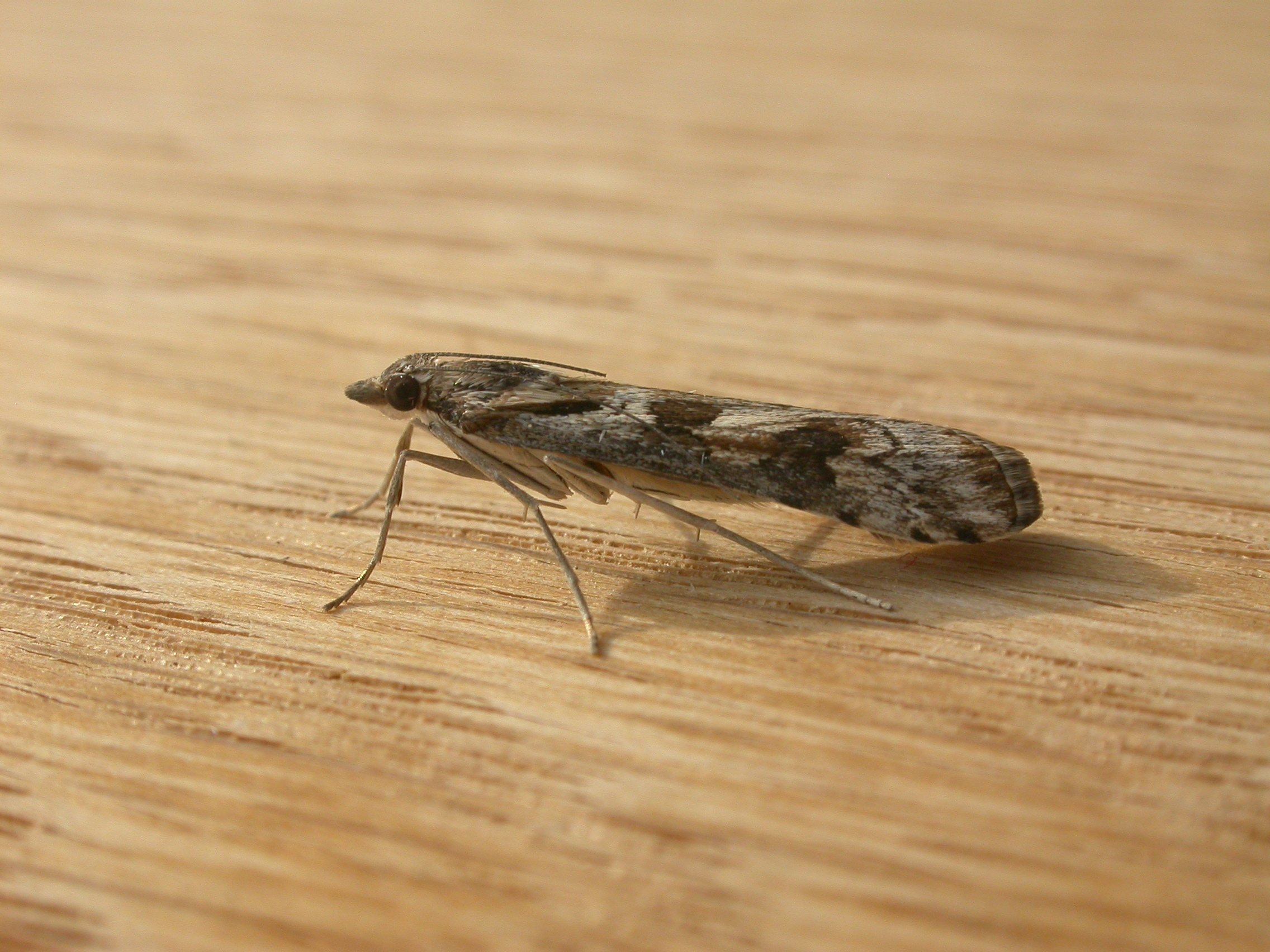
- Nomophila corticalis

Scientific classification
- Kingdom: Animalia
- Phylum: Arthropoda
- Class: Insecta
- Order: Lepidoptera
- Family: Crambidae
- Tribe: Nomophilini
- Genus: Nomophila; Hübner, 1825

Synonyms
- Macronomeutis Meyrick, 1936; Stenopteryx Duponchel, 1845

= Nomophila =

Genus of moths

Nomophila is a genus of moths of the family Crambidae.

== Species ==
- Nomophila africana Munroe, 1973
- Nomophila albisignalis Hampson, 1913
- Nomophila brevispinalis Munroe, 1973
- Nomophila colombiana Munroe, 1973
- Nomophila corticalis (Walker, 1869)
- Nomophila distinctalis Munroe, 1973
- Nomophila helvolalis (Maassen, 1890)
- Nomophila heterospila (Meyrick, 1936)
- Nomophila incognita Viette, 1959
- Nomophila indistinctalis (Walker, 1863)
- Nomophila moluccana Pagenstecher, 1884
- Nomophila nearctica Munroe, 1973
- Nomophila noctuella (Denis & Schiffermüller, 1775)
- Nomophila triticalis Berg, 1875

== Former species ==
- Nomophila astigmalis Hampson, 1899
