= Nomophila incognita =

Scientific classification
- Kingdom: Animalia
- Phylum: Arthropoda
- Class: Insecta
- Order: Lepidoptera
- Family: Crambidae
- Genus: Nomophila
- Species: N. incognita

Binomial name
- Nomophila incognita Viette, 1959

Species of moth

Nomophila incognita is a moth in the family Crambidae. It was described by Viette in 1959. It is found on Amsterdam Island.
