= Hemopsis angustalis =

Scientific classification
- Kingdom: Animalia
- Phylum: Arthropoda
- Class: Insecta
- Order: Lepidoptera
- Family: Crambidae
- Genus: Hemopsis
- Species: H. angustalis

Binomial name
- Hemopsis angustalis (Snellen, 1890)

Synonyms
- Botys angustalis Snellen, 1890

Species of moth

Hemopsis angustalis is a moth in the family Crambidae. It was described by Snellen in 1890. It is found in India.
