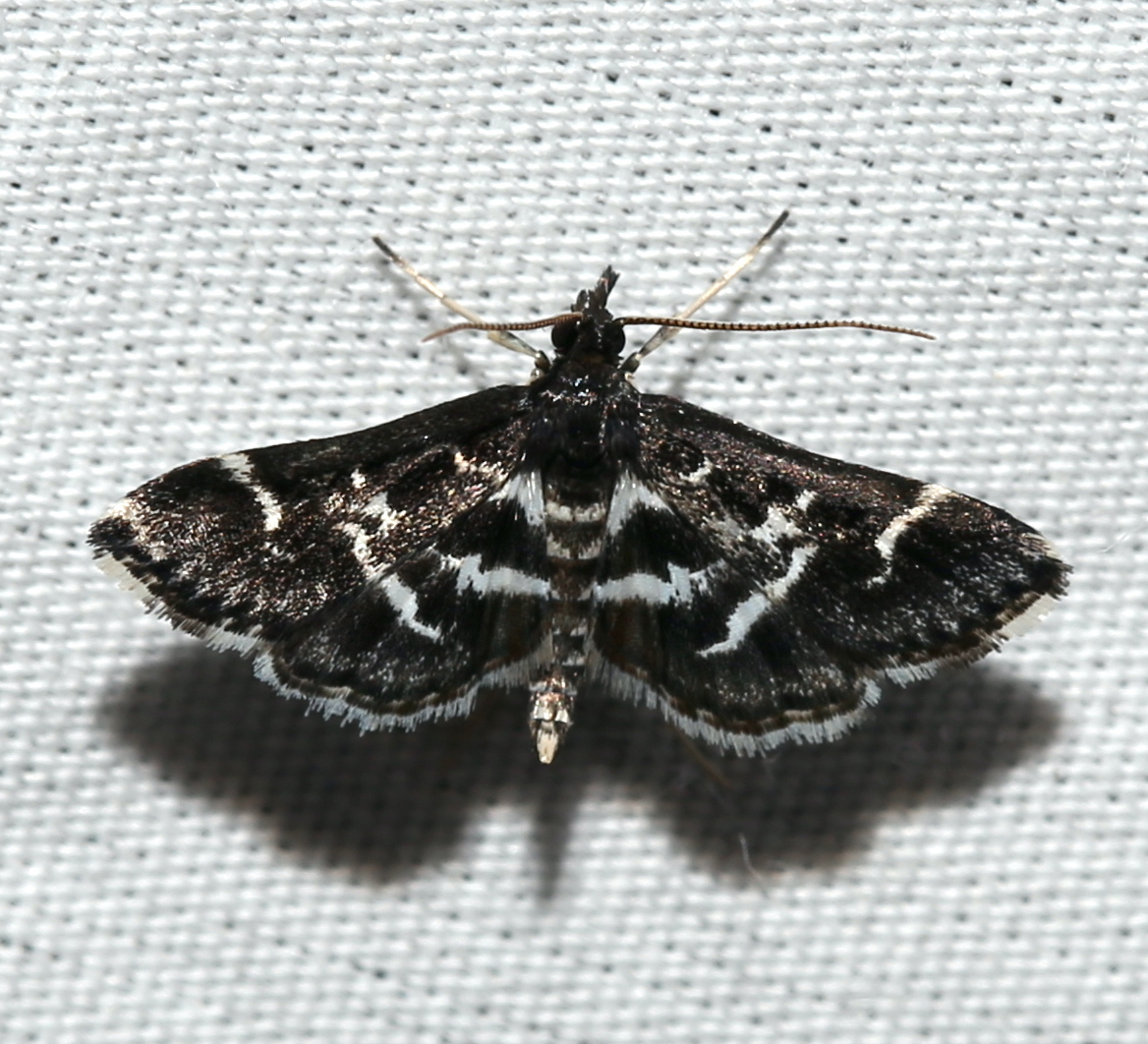

Scientific classification
- Kingdom: Animalia
- Phylum: Arthropoda
- Class: Insecta
- Order: Lepidoptera
- Family: Crambidae
- Genus: Diasemiodes
- Species: D. janassialis

Binomial name
- Diasemiodes janassialis (Walker, 1859)

Synonyms
- Desmia janassialis Walker, 1859; Botis hariolalis Hulst, 1886

= Diasemiodes janassialis =

Species of moth

Diasemiodes janassialis is a moth in the family Crambidae. It was described by Francis Walker in 1859. It is found in North America, where it has been recorded from Maryland to Florida and west to Texas.
