= Diathrausta angustella =

Scientific classification
- Kingdom: Animalia
- Phylum: Arthropoda
- Class: Insecta
- Order: Lepidoptera
- Family: Crambidae
- Genus: Diathrausta
- Species: D. angustella

Binomial name
- Diathrausta angustella Dyar, 1913

Synonyms
- Diathrausta nerinalis [[form (zoology)|form]] angustella Dyar, 1913

Species of moth

Diathrausta angustella is a moth in the family Crambidae. It was described by Harrison Gray Dyar Jr. in 1913. It is found in Panama.
