= Nomophila helvolalis =

Scientific classification
- Kingdom: Animalia
- Phylum: Arthropoda
- Class: Insecta
- Order: Lepidoptera
- Family: Crambidae
- Genus: Nomophila
- Species: N. helvolalis

Binomial name
- Nomophila helvolalis (Maassen, 1890)

Synonyms
- Botys helvolalis Maassen, 1890

Species of moth

Nomophila helvolalis is a moth in the family Crambidae. It was described by Peter Maassen in 1890. It is found in Bolivia.
