= Nomophila moluccana =

Scientific classification
- Domain: Eukaryota
- Kingdom: Animalia
- Phylum: Arthropoda
- Class: Insecta
- Order: Lepidoptera
- Family: Crambidae
- Genus: Nomophila
- Species: N. moluccana

Binomial name
- Nomophila moluccana Pagenstecher, 1884

Species of moth

Nomophila moluccana is a moth in the family Crambidae. It was described by Arnold Pagenstecher in 1884. It is found in Indonesia (Ambon Island).
