= Crocidocnemis pellucida =

Scientific classification
- Kingdom: Animalia
- Phylum: Arthropoda
- Class: Insecta
- Order: Lepidoptera
- Family: Crambidae
- Genus: Crocidocnemis
- Species: C. pellucida

Binomial name
- Crocidocnemis pellucida Warren, 1889

Species of moth

Crocidocnemis pellucida is a moth in the family Crambidae. It was described by Warren in 1889. It is found in Brazil (Amazonas).
