= Nomophila triticalis =

Scientific classification
- Kingdom: Animalia
- Phylum: Arthropoda
- Class: Insecta
- Order: Lepidoptera
- Family: Crambidae
- Genus: Nomophila
- Species: N. triticalis

Binomial name
- Nomophila triticalis Berg, 1875

Synonyms
- Nomophila squalidalis Hampson, 1913; Nomophila tetricalis

Species of moth

Nomophila triticalis is a moth in the family Crambidae. It was discovered by Carlos Berg in 1875 and is found in Argentina.
