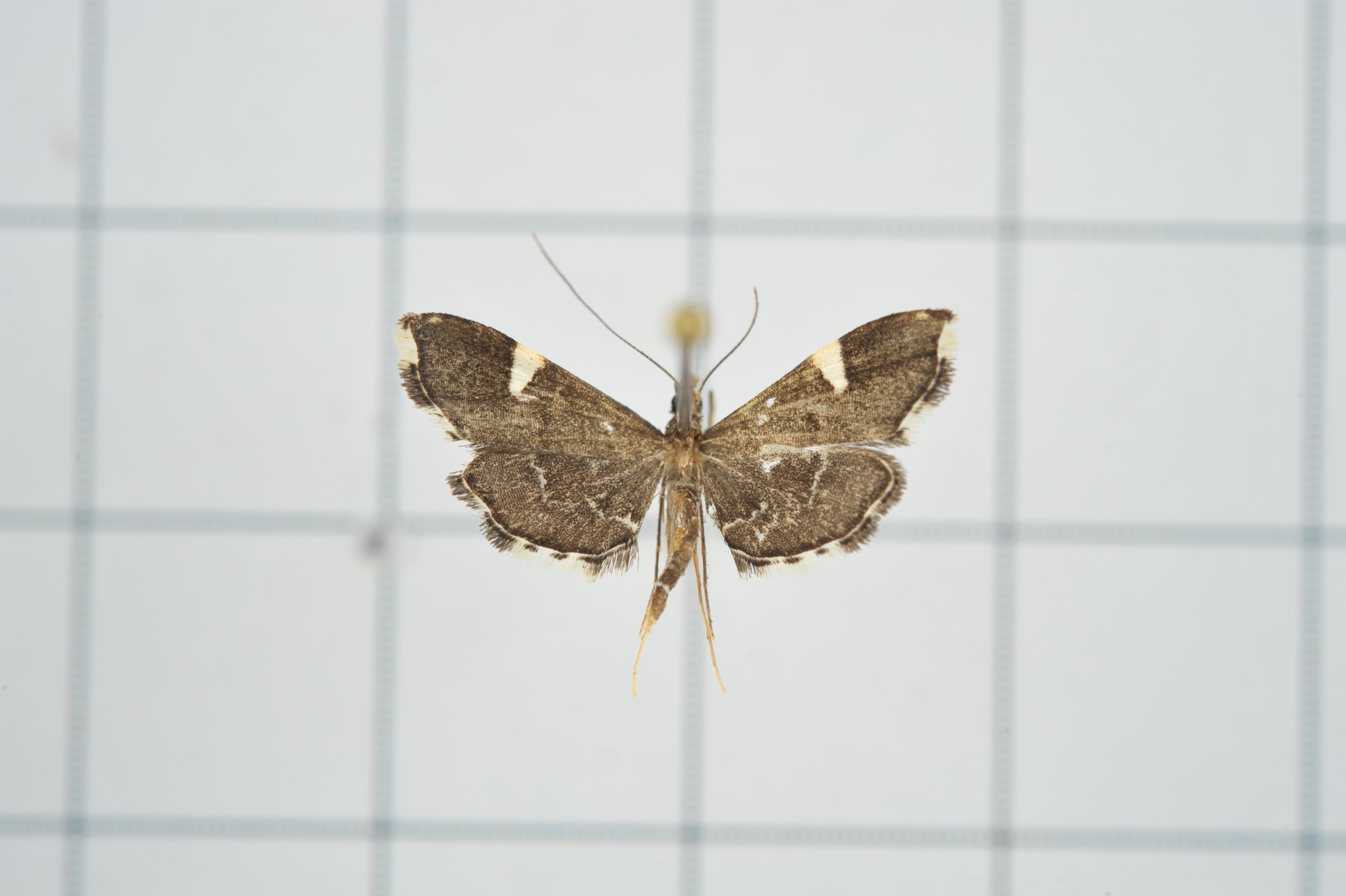

Scientific classification
- Kingdom: Animalia
- Phylum: Arthropoda
- Class: Insecta
- Order: Lepidoptera
- Family: Crambidae
- Genus: Diathrausta
- Species: D. profundalis

Binomial name
- Diathrausta profundalis Lederer, 1863

= Diathrausta profundalis =

Species of moth

Diathrausta profundalis is a moth in the family Crambidae. It was described by Julius Lederer in 1863. It is found on Ambon Island.
