= Nomophila africana =

Scientific classification
- Kingdom: Animalia
- Phylum: Arthropoda
- Class: Insecta
- Order: Lepidoptera
- Family: Crambidae
- Genus: Nomophila
- Species: N. africana

Binomial name
- Nomophila africana Munroe, 1973

Species of moth

Nomophila africana is a moth in the family Crambidae. It was described by Eugene G. Munroe in 1973. It is found in South Africa.
