= Diathrausta griseifusa =

Scientific classification
- Kingdom: Animalia
- Phylum: Arthropoda
- Class: Insecta
- Order: Lepidoptera
- Family: Crambidae
- Genus: Diathrausta
- Species: D. griseifusa

Binomial name
- Diathrausta griseifusa Hampson, 1917

Species of moth

Diathrausta griseifusa is a moth in the family Crambidae. It was described by George Hampson in 1917. It is found in Santa Catarina, Brazil.
