= Diathrausta semilunalis =

Scientific classification
- Kingdom: Animalia
- Phylum: Arthropoda
- Class: Insecta
- Order: Lepidoptera
- Family: Crambidae
- Genus: Diathrausta
- Species: D. semilunalis

Binomial name
- Diathrausta semilunalis Maes, 2006

Species of moth

Diathrausta semilunalis is a moth in the family Crambidae. It was described by Koen V. N. Maes in 2006. It is found in the Democratic Republic of the Congo (Katanga) and South Africa (Mpumalanga, KwaZulu-Natal, Limpopo, Gauteng).
