= Hemopsis dissipatalis =

Scientific classification
- Domain: Eukaryota
- Kingdom: Animalia
- Phylum: Arthropoda
- Class: Insecta
- Order: Lepidoptera
- Family: Crambidae
- Genus: Hemopsis
- Species: H. dissipatalis

Binomial name
- Hemopsis dissipatalis (Lederer, 1863)

Synonyms
- Botys dissipatalis Lederer, 1863

Species of moth

Hemopsis dissipatalis is a moth in the family Crambidae. It was described by Julius Lederer in 1863. It is found on Ambon Island in Indonesia.
