= Nomophila brevispinalis =

Scientific classification
- Kingdom: Animalia
- Phylum: Arthropoda
- Class: Insecta
- Order: Lepidoptera
- Family: Crambidae
- Genus: Nomophila
- Species: N. brevispinalis

Binomial name
- Nomophila brevispinalis Munroe, 1973

Species of moth

Nomophila brevispinalis is a moth in the family Crambidae. It was described by Eugene G. Munroe in 1973. It is found in the Democratic Republic of the Congo (Katanga), South Africa, Tanzania and Zambia.
