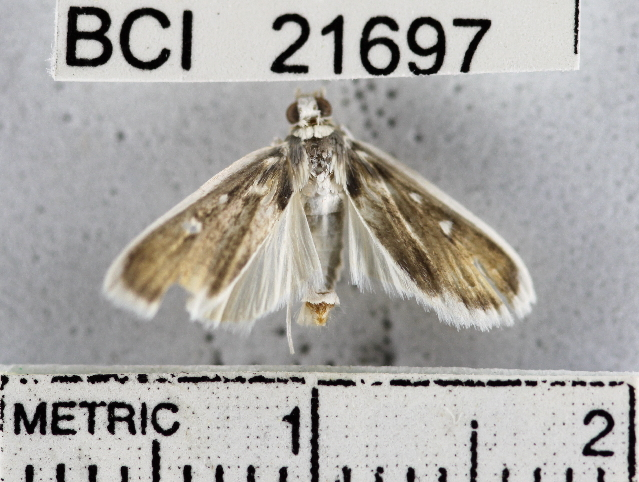

Scientific classification
- Kingdom: Animalia
- Phylum: Arthropoda
- Class: Insecta
- Order: Lepidoptera
- Family: Crambidae
- Genus: Parapilocrocis
- Species: P. albomarginalis

Binomial name
- Parapilocrocis albomarginalis (Schaus, 1920)

Synonyms
- Tyspanodes albomarginalis Schaus, 1920

= Parapilocrocis albomarginalis =

Species of moth

Parapilocrocis albomarginalis is a moth in the family Crambidae. It was described by Schaus in 1920. It is found in Guatemala, Panama and Costa Rica.
