= Nomophila indistinctalis =

Scientific classification
- Kingdom: Animalia
- Phylum: Arthropoda
- Class: Insecta
- Order: Lepidoptera
- Family: Crambidae
- Genus: Nomophila
- Species: N. indistinctalis

Binomial name
- Nomophila indistinctalis (Walker, 1863)

Synonyms
- Nephopteryx indistinctalis Walker, 1863

Species of moth

Nomophila indistinctalis is a moth in the family Crambidae. It was described by Francis Walker in 1863. It is found in Brazil.
