= Parapilocrocis citribasalis =

Scientific classification
- Kingdom: Animalia
- Phylum: Arthropoda
- Class: Insecta
- Order: Lepidoptera
- Family: Crambidae
- Genus: Parapilocrocis
- Species: P. citribasalis

Binomial name
- Parapilocrocis citribasalis Munroe, 1967

Species of moth

Parapilocrocis citribasalis is a moth in the family Crambidae. It was described by Eugene G. Munroe in 1967. It is found in Bolivia.
