= Diasemiodes eudamidasalis =

Scientific classification
- Kingdom: Animalia
- Phylum: Arthropoda
- Class: Insecta
- Order: Lepidoptera
- Family: Crambidae
- Genus: Diasemiodes
- Species: D. eudamidasalis

Binomial name
- Diasemiodes eudamidasalis (H. Druce, 1899)

Synonyms
- Ischnurges eudamidasalis H. Druce, 1899

Species of moth

Diasemiodes eudamidasalis is a moth in the family Crambidae. It was described by Herbert Druce in 1899. It is found in Mexico (Xalapa), Costa Rica and Florida.
