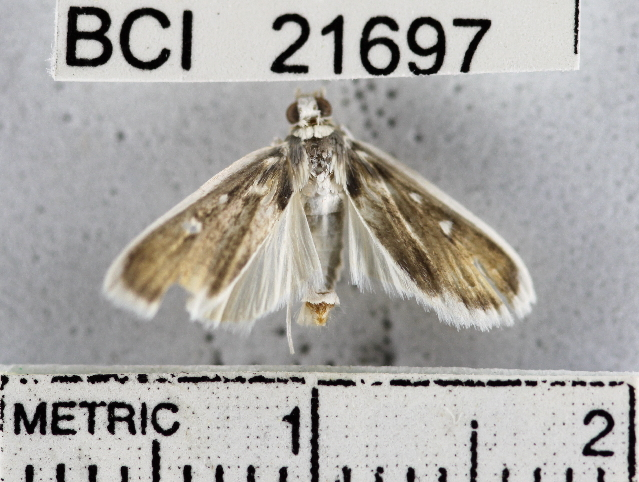
- Parapilocrocis albomarginalis

Scientific classification
- Kingdom: Animalia
- Phylum: Arthropoda
- Class: Insecta
- Order: Lepidoptera
- Family: Crambidae
- Tribe: Nomophilini
- Genus: Parapilocrocis; Munroe, 1967

= Parapilocrocis =

Genus of moths

Parapilocrocis is a genus of moths of the family Crambidae described by Eugene G. Munroe in 1967.

== Species ==
- Parapilocrocis albomarginalis (Schaus, 1920)
- Parapilocrocis citribasalis Munroe, 1967

== Former species ==
- Parapilocrocis albipunctalis (Hampson, 1918)
