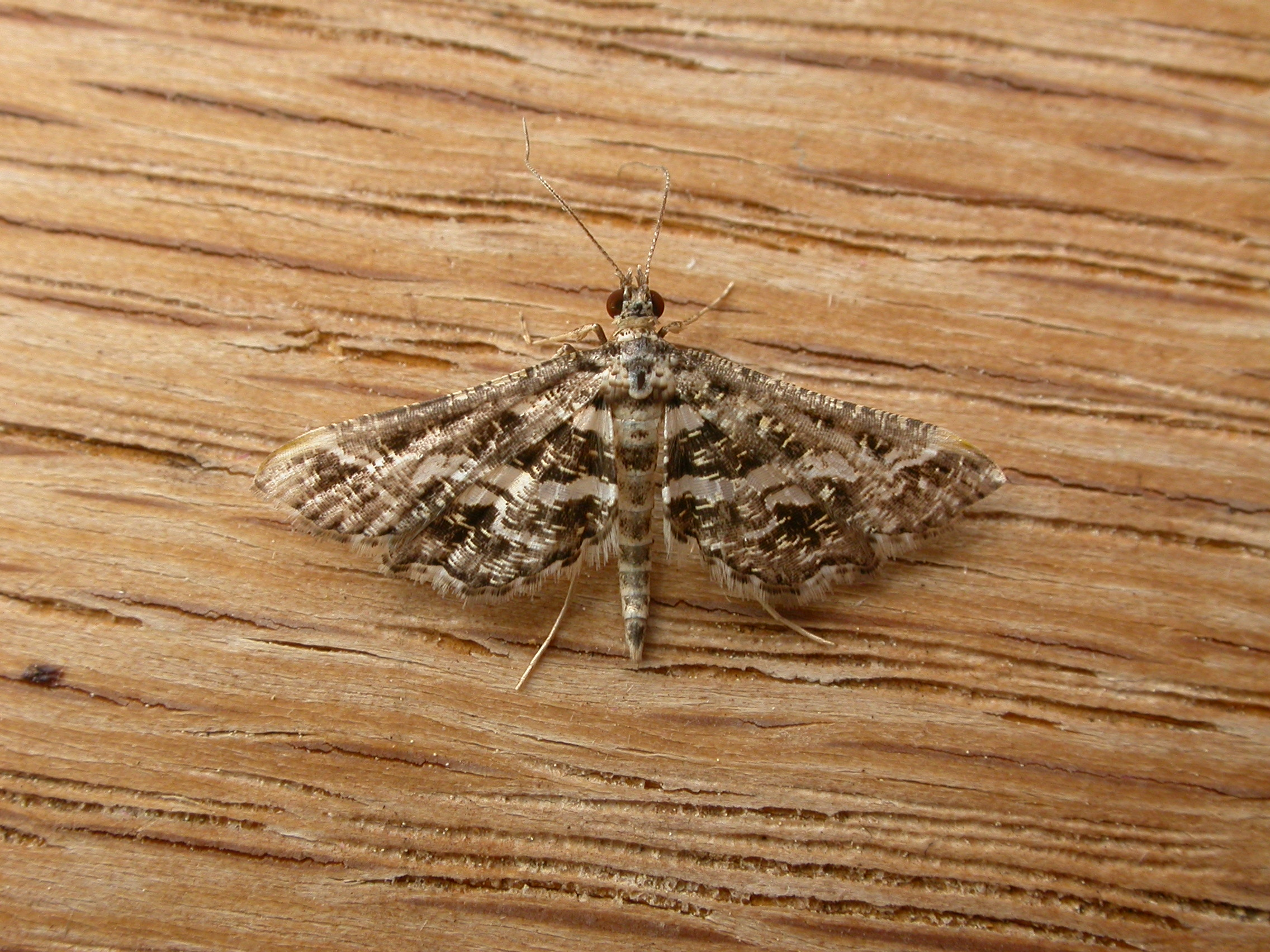

Scientific classification
- Kingdom: Animalia
- Phylum: Arthropoda
- Class: Insecta
- Order: Lepidoptera
- Family: Crambidae
- Genus: Diasemiopsis
- Species: D. ramburialis

Binomial name
- Diasemiopsis ramburialis (Duponchel, 1834)

Synonyms
- List: Hydrocampa ramburialis Duponchel, 1834; Isopteryx melaleucalis Walker, 1859; Diasemia reconditalis Walker, 1866; Diasemia leucophaealis Walker, 1866

= Diasemiopsis ramburialis =

Species of moth

Diasemiopsis ramburialis is a moth of the family Crambidae. It occurs in most of Europe and the tropics, including the Azores, Fiji, New Zealand and Australia. It is scarce migrant in Britain.

== Description ==
The wingspan is 17–22 mm.

== Taxonomy ==
This species was first described by Philogène Auguste Joseph Duponchel in 1834 and originally named Hydrocampa ramburialis.

== Hosts ==
The larvae have been shown to feed on the water fern species Azolla filiculoides.
