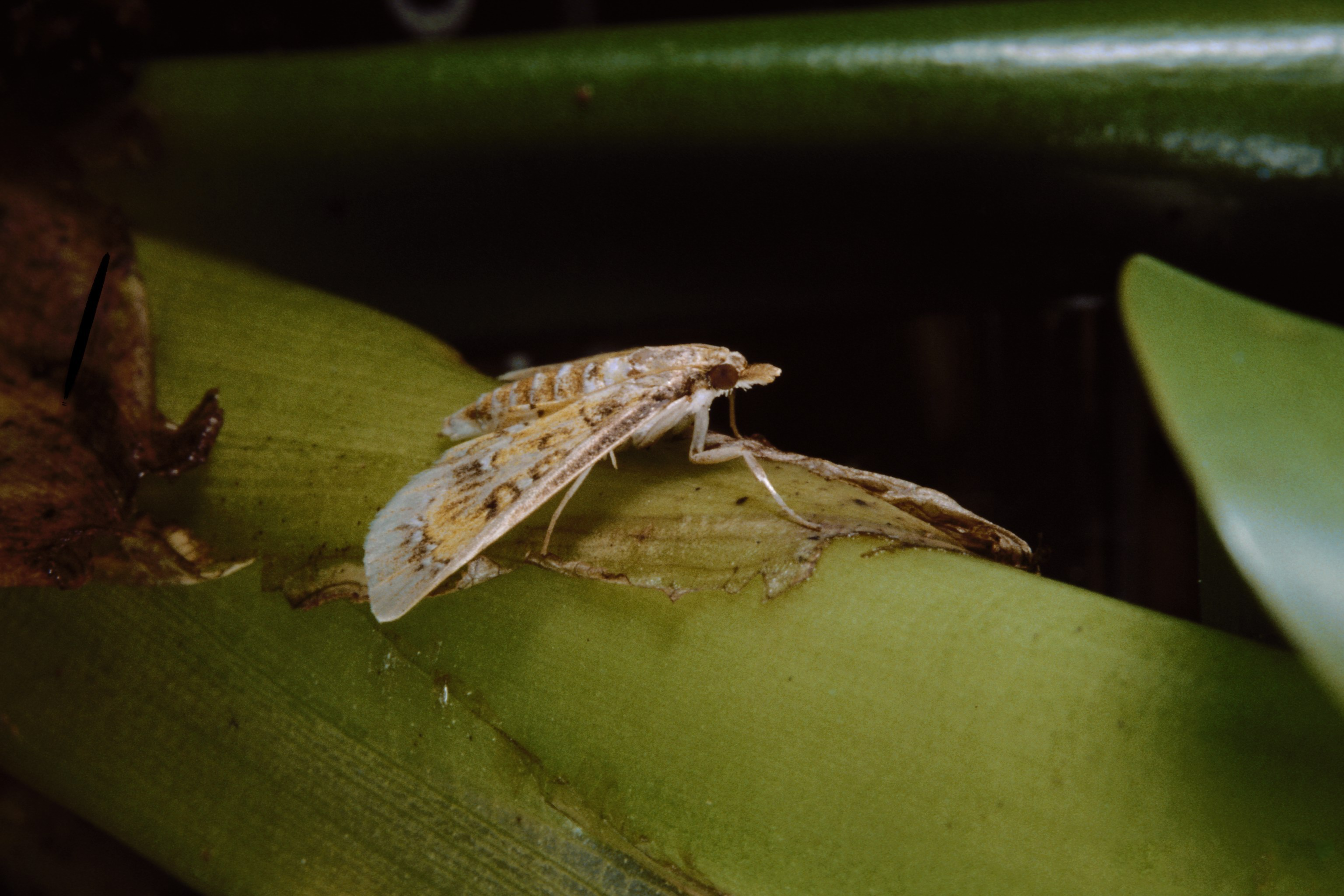

Scientific classification
- Kingdom: Animalia
- Phylum: Arthropoda
- Clade: Pancrustacea
- Class: Insecta
- Order: Lepidoptera
- Family: Crambidae
- Subfamily: Spilomelinae
- Tribe: Nomophilini
- Genus: Niphograpta; Warren, 1892
- Species: N. albiguttalis

Binomial name
- Niphograpta albiguttalis (Warren, 1889)

Synonyms
- Epichronistis albiguttalis Warren, 1889; Sameodes albiguttalis

= Niphograpta =

Genus of moths

Niphograpta is a genus of moths of the family Crambidae. It contains only one species, Niphograpta albiguttalis, the water hyacinth moth,. It is native to the Amazon basin, but has been introduced in North America (where it is found from Florida, along the gulf coast to Louisiana and Texas), Africa and Australia (where it is found in Queensland and New South Wales) to control the spread of water hyacinth.

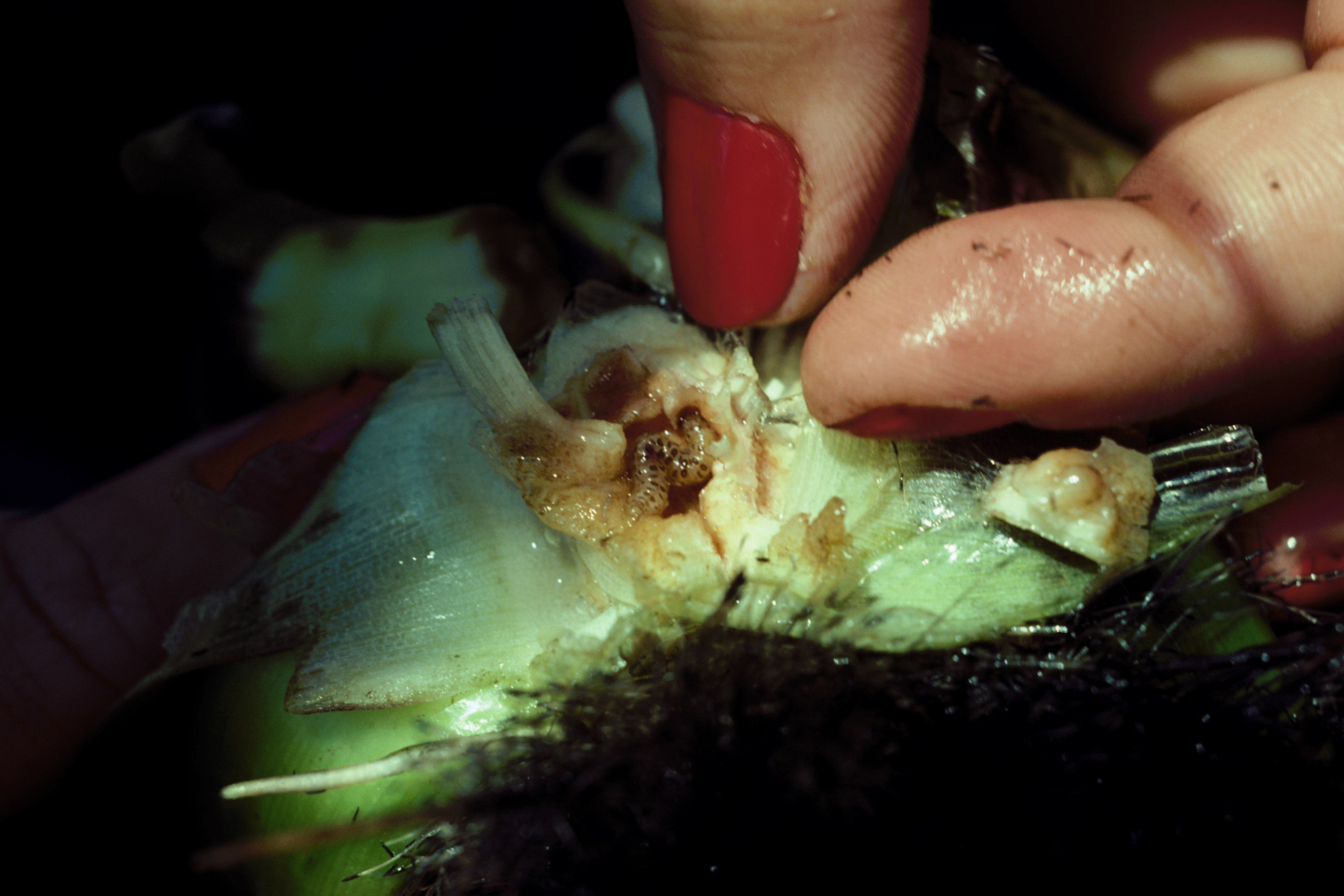
Damage

The wingspan is 18–21 millimetres (0.71–0.83 in).
