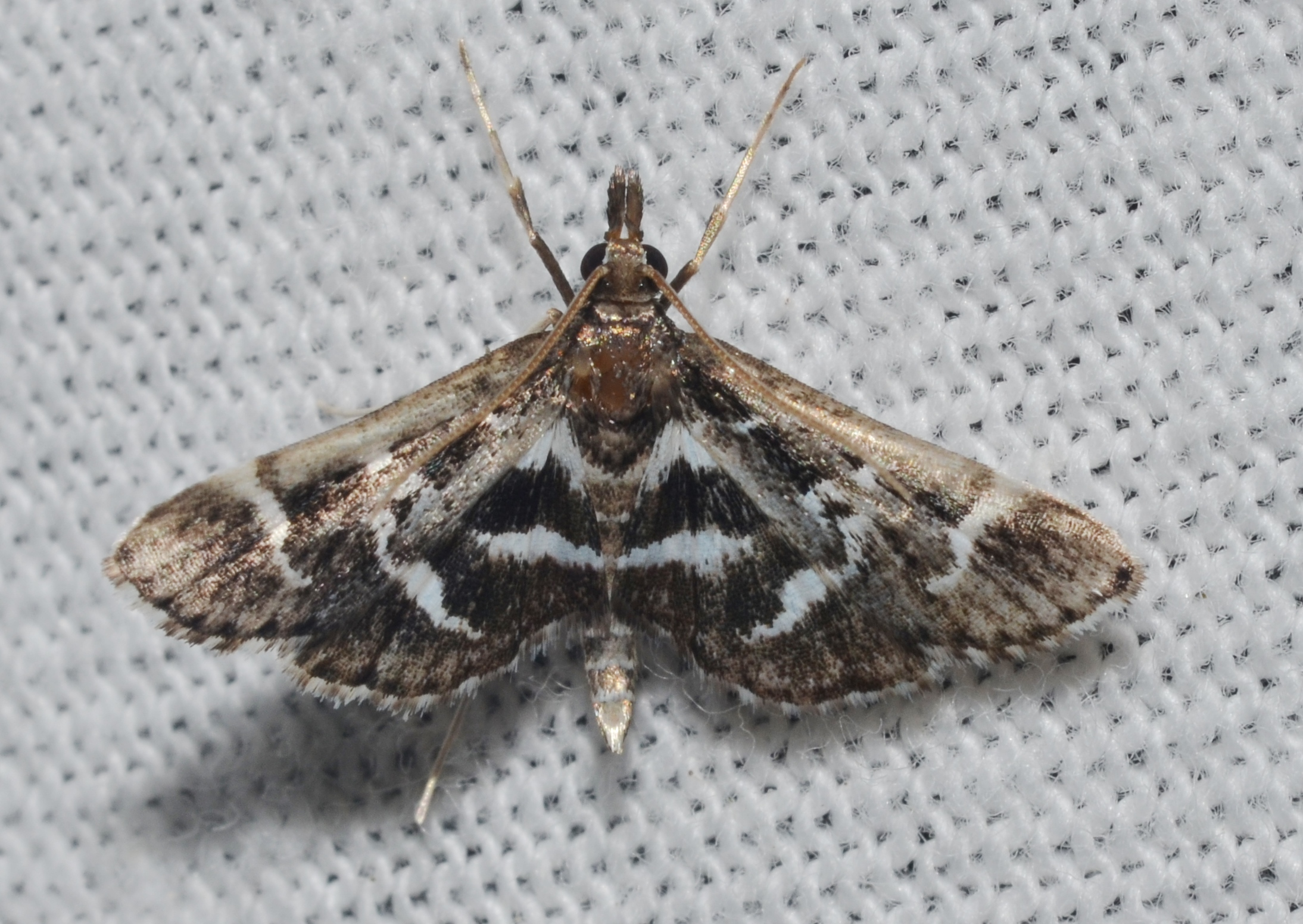
- Diasemiodes janassialis

Scientific classification
- Kingdom: Animalia
- Phylum: Arthropoda
- Class: Insecta
- Order: Lepidoptera
- Family: Crambidae
- Subfamily: Spilomelinae
- Genus: Diasemiodes; Munroe, 1957

= Diasemiodes =

Genus of moths

Diasemiodes is a genus of moths of the family Crambidae.

== Species ==
- Diasemiodes eudamidasalis (Druce, 1899)
- Diasemiodes janassialis (Walker, 1859)
- Diasemiodes nigralis (Fernald, 1892)
- Diasemiodes picalis
