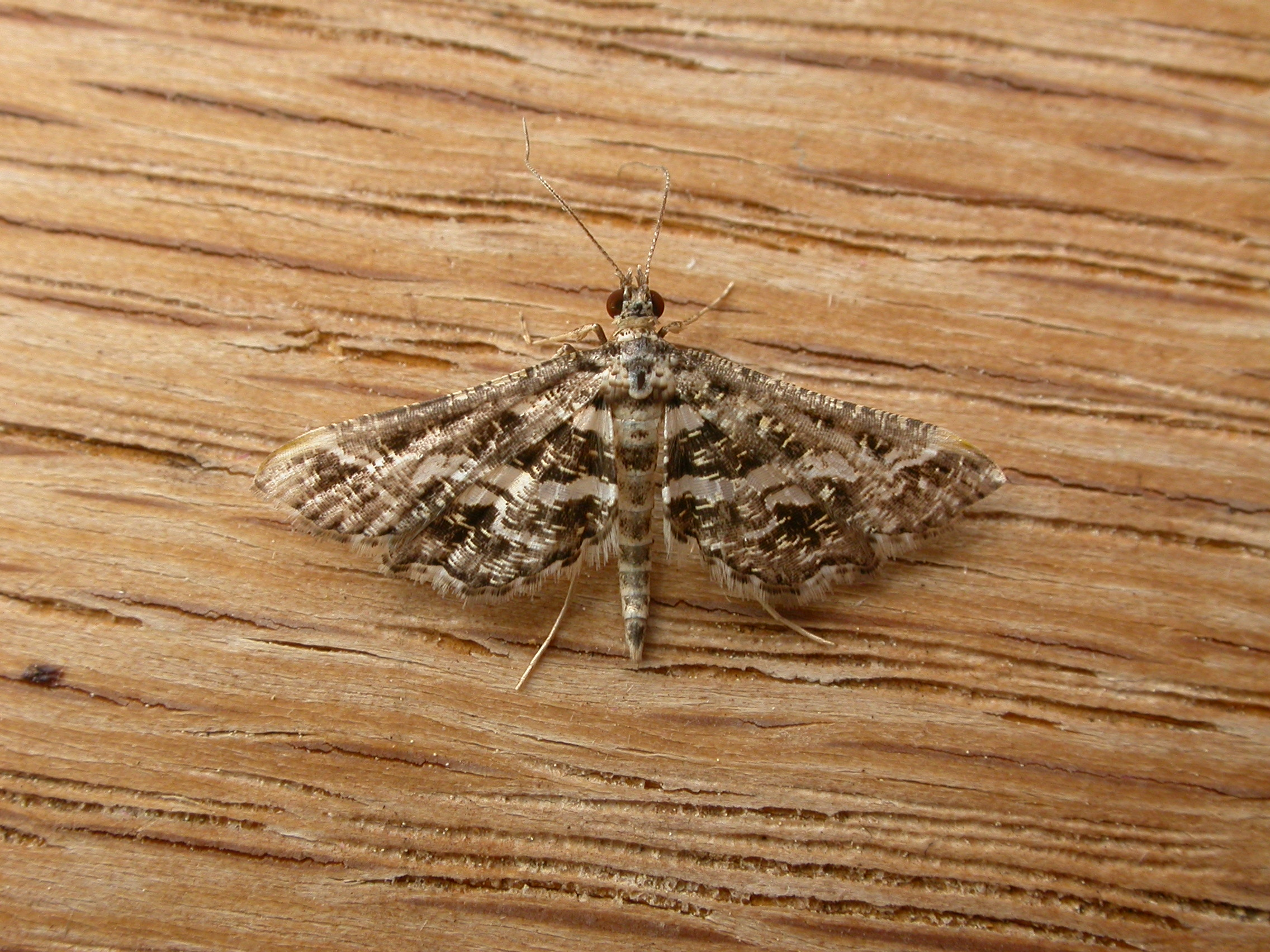
- Diasemiopsis ramburialis

Scientific classification
- Kingdom: Animalia
- Phylum: Arthropoda
- Class: Insecta
- Order: Lepidoptera
- Family: Crambidae
- Subfamily: Spilomelinae
- Genus: Diasemiopsis; Munroe, 1957

Synonyms
- Diasemopsis Leraut, 1997

= Diasemiopsis =

Genus of moths

Diasemiopsis is a genus of moths of the family Crambidae.

== Species ==
- Diasemiopsis leodocusalis (Walker, 1859)
- Diasemiopsis ramburialis (Duponchel, 1833)
