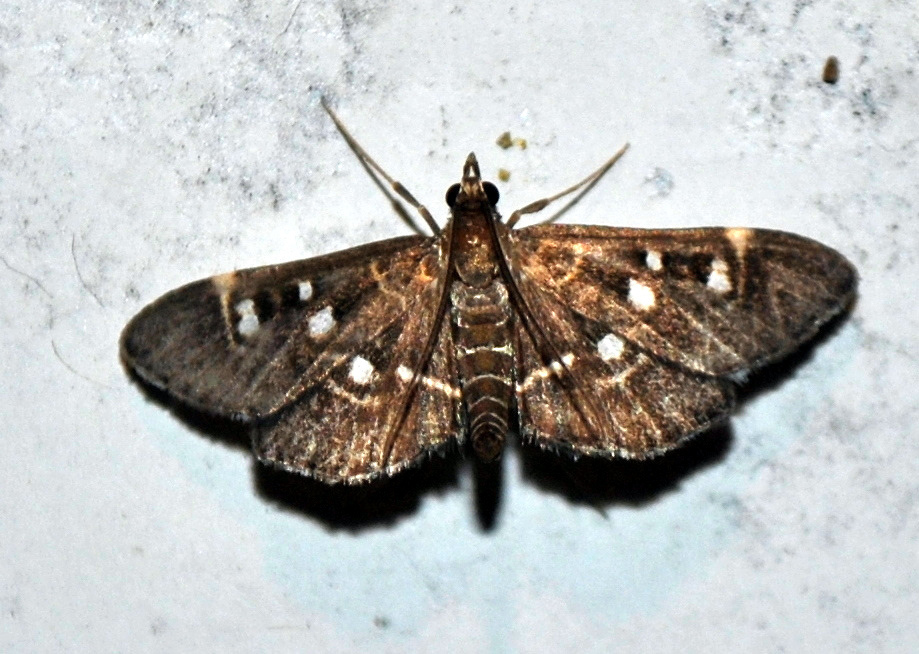
- Diathrausta harlequinalis

Scientific classification
- Kingdom: Animalia
- Phylum: Arthropoda
- Clade: Pancrustacea
- Class: Insecta
- Order: Lepidoptera
- Family: Crambidae
- Subfamily: Spilomelinae
- Genus: Diathrausta; Lederer, 1863

Synonyms
- Tripodaula Meyrick, 1933; Triplodaula Munroe, 1956

= Diathrausta =

Genus of moths

Diathrausta is a genus of moths in the family Crambidae. The genus was described by Julius Lederer in 1863.

== Species ==
- Diathrausta angustella Dyar, 1913
- Diathrausta brevifascialis (Wileman, 1911)
- Diathrausta cacalis Dyar, 1913
- Diathrausta cubanalis Dyar, 1913
- Diathrausta delicata (Warren, 1896)
- Diathrausta griseifusa Hampson, 1917
- Diathrausta harlequinalis Dyar, 1913
- Diathrausta leucographa Hampson, 1917
- Diathrausta lypera Tams, 1935
- Diathrausta minutalis (Druce, 1899)
- Diathrausta nerinalis (Walker, 1859)
- Diathrausta ochreipennis (Butler, 1886)
- Diathrausta ochrifuscalis (Hampson, 1903)
- Diathrausta picata (Butler, 1889)
- Diathrausta plumbealis (Warren, 1896)
- Diathrausta profundalis Lederer, 1863
- Diathrausta reconditalis (Walker, 1859)
- Diathrausta semilunalis Maes, 2006
- Diathrausta stagmatopa (Meyrick, 1933)
- Diathrausta yunquealis Schaus, 1940
