= Crocidocnemis =

Scientific classification
- Kingdom: Animalia
- Phylum: Arthropoda
- Class: Insecta
- Order: Lepidoptera
- Family: Crambidae
- Subfamily: Spilomelinae
- Genus: Crocidocnemis; Warren, 1889

Synonyms
- Somatania Möschler, 1890; Somatamia Kimball, 1965

Genus of moths

Crocidocnemis is a genus of moths of the family Crambidae.

== Species ==
- Crocidocnemis pellucida Warren, 1889
- Crocidocnemis pellucidalis (Möschler, 1890)
