= Hymeniini =

Scientific classification
- Kingdom: Animalia
- Phylum: Arthropoda
- Clade: Pancrustacea
- Class: Insecta
- Order: Lepidoptera
- Family: Crambidae
- Subfamily: Spilomelinae
- Tribe: Hymeniini; C. Swinhoe, 1900

Tribe of moths

Hymeniini is a tribe of the species-rich subfamily Spilomelinae in the pyraloid moth family Crambidae. The tribe was erected by Charles Swinhoe in 1900.

Hymeniini comprises five species in two genera:

- Hymenia Hübner, 1825 (= Zinckenia Zeller, 1852)
  - Hymenia lophoceralis (Hampson, 1912)
  - Hymenia nigerrimalis (Hampson, 1900)
  - Hymenia perspectalis (Hübner, 1796)
- Spoladea Guenée, 1854
  - Spoladea mimetica Munroe, 1974
  - Spoladea recurvalis (Fabricius, 1775)
