= List of crambid genera: Z =

The large moth family Crambidae contains the following genera beginning with "Z":

- Zacatecas
- Zagiridia
- Zeadiatraea
- Zebrodes
- Zebronia
- Zellerina
- Zenamorpha
- Zeuzerobotys
- Zinckenia
- Zolca
- Zovax
