= Zacatecas (disambiguation) =

Zacatecas is a state of Mexico.

Zacatecas may also refer to:

== Places ==
- Zacatecas (city), capital city of Zacatecas
- Zacatecas Cathedral
- Zacatecas, Acaponeta
- Zacatecas, Jalostotitlán
- Zacatecas, La Paz
- Zacatecas, Mezquital
- Zacatecas, Sabinas Hidalgo
- Zacatecas, San Miguel de Allende

== Other ==
- Mineros de Zacatecas, Mexican football team
- "Zacatecas March", Zacatecas patriotic song
- Zacatecas ankasokellus, a species of moth in the monotypic genus Zacatecas
