= Zagiridia alamotralis =

Scientific classification
- Kingdom: Animalia
- Phylum: Arthropoda
- Class: Insecta
- Order: Lepidoptera
- Family: Crambidae
- Genus: Zagiridia
- Species: Z. alamotralis

Binomial name
- Zagiridia alamotralis Viette, 1973

Species of moth

Zagiridia alamotralis is a moth in the family Crambidae. It was described by Viette in 1973. It is found in Madagascar.
