= Tegostoma florilegaria =

Scientific classification
- Domain: Eukaryota
- Kingdom: Animalia
- Phylum: Arthropoda
- Class: Insecta
- Order: Lepidoptera
- Family: Crambidae
- Subfamily: Odontiinae
- Tribe: Odontiini
- Genus: Tegostoma
- Species: T. florilegaria

Binomial name
- Tegostoma florilegaria Guenée, 1857

Species of moth

Tegostoma florilegaria is a moth in the family Crambidae. It was described by Achille Guenée in 1857. It is found in Namibia and South Africa.
