= Tegostoma flavida =

Scientific classification
- Domain: Eukaryota
- Kingdom: Animalia
- Phylum: Arthropoda
- Class: Insecta
- Order: Lepidoptera
- Family: Crambidae
- Subfamily: Odontiinae
- Tribe: Odontiini
- Genus: Tegostoma
- Species: T. flavida

Binomial name
- Tegostoma flavida (Moore, 1881)

Synonyms
- Thalpochares flavida Moore, 1881

Species of moth

Tegostoma flavida is a moth in the family Crambidae. It was described by Frederic Moore in 1881. It is found in the Punjab region of what was British India.
