= Tegostoma ruptilineale =

Scientific classification
- Domain: Eukaryota
- Kingdom: Animalia
- Phylum: Arthropoda
- Class: Insecta
- Order: Lepidoptera
- Family: Crambidae
- Subfamily: Odontiinae
- Tribe: Odontiini
- Genus: Tegostoma
- Species: T. ruptilineale

Binomial name
- Tegostoma ruptilineale Zerney, 1914

Species of moth

Tegostoma ruptilineale is a moth in the family Crambidae. It was described by Zerney in 1914. It is found in Armenia.
