= Tegostoma embale =

Scientific classification
- Domain: Eukaryota
- Kingdom: Animalia
- Phylum: Arthropoda
- Class: Insecta
- Order: Lepidoptera
- Family: Crambidae
- Subfamily: Odontiinae
- Tribe: Odontiini
- Genus: Tegostoma
- Species: T. embale

Binomial name
- Tegostoma embale Caradja, 1928

Species of moth

Tegostoma embale is a moth in the family Crambidae. It was described by Aristide Caradja in 1928. It is found in Uralsk, Russia.
