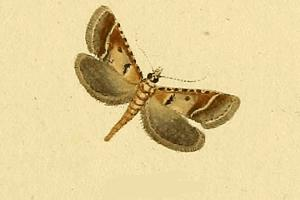

Scientific classification
- Kingdom: Animalia
- Phylum: Arthropoda
- Clade: Pancrustacea
- Class: Insecta
- Order: Lepidoptera
- Family: Crambidae
- Subfamily: Odontiinae
- Tribe: Odontiini
- Genus: Tegostoma
- Species: T. comparalis

Binomial name
- Tegostoma comparalis (Hübner, 1796)

Synonyms
- Pyralis comparalis Hübner, 1796; Pyralis ramalis Hübner, 1796; Pyralis tenebrosalis Walker, 1866; Tegostoma comparalis sahariensis Rothschild, 1921; Scopula fotalis Swinhoe, 1886; Tegostoma distinctale Caradja, 1916

= Tegostoma comparalis =

Species of moth

Tegostoma comparalis is a species of moth in the family Crambidae. It was described by Jacob Hübner in 1796. It is found in Spain, France, Italy, Croatia, North Macedonia, Greece, Bulgaria, Romania, Ukraine, Kyrgyzstan, North Africa, India, Pakistan, the Near East, Turkmenistan, the United Arab Emirates, Yemen, South Africa and Niger.

The wingspan is about 18 millimetres (0.71 in).

The larvae feed on Salsola kali and Tribulus terrestris.
