= Tegostoma anaemicalis =

Scientific classification
- Domain: Eukaryota
- Kingdom: Animalia
- Phylum: Arthropoda
- Class: Insecta
- Order: Lepidoptera
- Family: Crambidae
- Subfamily: Odontiinae
- Tribe: Odontiini
- Genus: Tegostoma
- Species: T. anaemicalis

Binomial name
- Tegostoma anaemicalis (Hampson, 1900)

Synonyms
- Noctuelia anaemicalis Hampson, 1900

Species of moth

Tegostoma anaemicalis is a moth in the family Crambidae. It was described by George Hampson in 1900. It is found in Algeria.
