= Zagiridia noctualis =

Scientific classification
- Kingdom: Animalia
- Phylum: Arthropoda
- Class: Insecta
- Order: Lepidoptera
- Family: Crambidae
- Genus: Zagiridia
- Species: Z. noctualis

Binomial name
- Zagiridia noctualis Hampson, 1897

Synonyms
- Zagiridia rufalis Hampson, 1917

Species of moth

Zagiridia noctualis is a moth in the family Crambidae. It was described by George Hampson in 1897. It is found on Borneo and on Woodlark Island in Papua New Guinea.

The wingspan is about 20 mm. Adults are dull grey brown with a slight rufous tinge, the forewings with faint traces of an antemedial line, angled on the median nervure. Both wings have a black speck at each angle of the cell and there is a very indistinct pale postmedial line with a series of obscure dark specks on its inner edge, retracted at vein 2 to below the end of the cell. There is an obscure pale waved submarginal line with a series of dark specks inside it and slightly angled inward on vein 5. There is also a marginal series of black specks.
