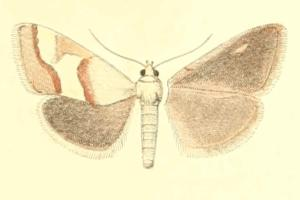

Scientific classification
- Domain: Eukaryota
- Kingdom: Animalia
- Phylum: Arthropoda
- Class: Insecta
- Order: Lepidoptera
- Family: Crambidae
- Subfamily: Odontiinae
- Tribe: Odontiini
- Genus: Tegostoma
- Species: T. baphialis

Binomial name
- Tegostoma baphialis (Staudinger, 1871)

Synonyms
- Anthophilodes baphialis Staudinger, 1871; Anthophilopsis baphialis; Anthophilodes plumbiferalis Christoph, 1877; Tegostoma baphialis f. oleaginalis Amsel, 1970

= Tegostoma baphialis =

Species of moth

Tegostoma baphialis is a species of moth in the family Crambidae. It is found in Greece, Russia, Turkmenistan and Afghanistan.

The wingspan is 16–17 mm.
