= Tegostoma praestantalis =

Scientific classification
- Domain: Eukaryota
- Kingdom: Animalia
- Phylum: Arthropoda
- Class: Insecta
- Order: Lepidoptera
- Family: Crambidae
- Subfamily: Odontiinae
- Tribe: Odontiini
- Genus: Tegostoma
- Species: T. praestantalis

Binomial name
- Tegostoma praestantalis (D. Lucas, 1943)

Synonyms
- Pionea praestantalis D. Lucas, 1943

Species of moth

Tegostoma praestantalis is a moth in the family Crambidae. It was described by Daniel Lucas in 1943. It is found in Algeria.
