= Tegostoma mossulalis =

Scientific classification
- Domain: Eukaryota
- Kingdom: Animalia
- Phylum: Arthropoda
- Class: Insecta
- Order: Lepidoptera
- Family: Crambidae
- Subfamily: Odontiinae
- Tribe: Odontiini
- Genus: Tegostoma
- Species: T. mossulalis

Binomial name
- Tegostoma mossulalis Amsel, 1949

Species of moth

Tegostoma mossulalis is a moth in the family Crambidae. It was described by Hans Georg Amsel in 1949 and is found in Iraq.
