= Tegostoma uniforma =

Scientific classification
- Domain: Eukaryota
- Kingdom: Animalia
- Phylum: Arthropoda
- Class: Insecta
- Order: Lepidoptera
- Family: Crambidae
- Subfamily: Odontiinae
- Tribe: Odontiini
- Genus: Tegostoma
- Species: T. uniforma

Binomial name
- Tegostoma uniforma Amsel, 1951

Synonyms
- Tegostoma uniforma f. grisea Amsel, 1970

Species of moth

Tegostoma uniforma is a moth in the family Crambidae. It was described by Hans Georg Amsel in 1951 and is found in Afghanistan.
