= Tegostoma marginalis =

Scientific classification
- Domain: Eukaryota
- Kingdom: Animalia
- Phylum: Arthropoda
- Class: Insecta
- Order: Lepidoptera
- Family: Crambidae
- Subfamily: Odontiinae
- Tribe: Odontiini
- Genus: Tegostoma
- Species: T. marginalis

Binomial name
- Tegostoma marginalis Amsel, 1961

Species of moth

Tegostoma marginalis is a moth in the family Crambidae. It was described by Hans Georg Amsel in 1961 and is found in Iran.
