= Tegostoma sarobiella =

Scientific classification
- Domain: Eukaryota
- Kingdom: Animalia
- Phylum: Arthropoda
- Class: Insecta
- Order: Lepidoptera
- Family: Crambidae
- Subfamily: Odontiinae
- Tribe: Odontiini
- Genus: Tegostoma
- Species: T. sarobiella

Binomial name
- Tegostoma sarobiella Amsel, 1970

Species of moth

Tegostoma sarobiella is a moth in the family Crambidae. It was described by Hans Georg Amsel in 1970 and is found in Afghanistan.
