= Tegostoma moeschleri =

Scientific classification
- Domain: Eukaryota
- Kingdom: Animalia
- Phylum: Arthropoda
- Class: Insecta
- Order: Lepidoptera
- Family: Crambidae
- Subfamily: Odontiinae
- Tribe: Odontiini
- Genus: Tegostoma
- Species: T. moeschleri

Binomial name
- Tegostoma moeschleri (Christoph, 1862)

Synonyms
- Thalpochares moeschleri Christoph, 1862; Anthophilopsis moeschleri; Tegostoma moeschleri tancreale Caradja, 1916; Tegostoma uniforma Amsel, 1951

Species of moth

Tegostoma moeschleri is a species of moth in the family Crambidae. It is found in Afghanistan, Russia and Iran.
