= Tegostoma albizonalis =

Scientific classification
- Domain: Eukaryota
- Kingdom: Animalia
- Phylum: Arthropoda
- Class: Insecta
- Order: Lepidoptera
- Family: Crambidae
- Subfamily: Odontiinae
- Tribe: Odontiini
- Genus: Tegostoma
- Species: T. albizonalis

Binomial name
- Tegostoma albizonalis Hampson, 1900

Species of moth

Tegostoma albizonalis is a moth in the family Crambidae. It was described by George Hampson in 1900. It is found in Central Asia, where it has been recorded from Armenia and Turkmenistan.
