= Tegostoma stangei =

Scientific classification
- Domain: Eukaryota
- Kingdom: Animalia
- Phylum: Arthropoda
- Class: Insecta
- Order: Lepidoptera
- Family: Crambidae
- Subfamily: Odontiinae
- Tribe: Odontiini
- Genus: Tegostoma
- Species: T. stangei

Binomial name
- Tegostoma stangei Zerney, 1916

Species of moth

Tegostoma stangei is a moth in the family Crambidae. It was described by Zerney in 1916. It is found in Transcaspia and northern Afghanistan.
