= Tegostoma lepidalis =

Scientific classification
- Domain: Eukaryota
- Kingdom: Animalia
- Phylum: Arthropoda
- Class: Insecta
- Order: Lepidoptera
- Family: Crambidae
- Subfamily: Odontiinae
- Tribe: Odontiini
- Genus: Tegostoma
- Species: T. lepidalis

Binomial name
- Tegostoma lepidalis (Herrich-Schäffer, 1851)

Synonyms
- Metoponia lepidalis Herrich-Schäffer, 1851; Tegostoma lepidalis apurpurealis Amsel, 1970

Species of moth

Tegostoma lepidalis is a moth in the family Crambidae. It was described by Gottlieb August Wilhelm Herrich-Schäffer in 1851. It is found in Afghanistan.
