= Tegostoma aequifascialis =

Scientific classification
- Domain: Eukaryota
- Kingdom: Animalia
- Phylum: Arthropoda
- Class: Insecta
- Order: Lepidoptera
- Family: Crambidae
- Subfamily: Odontiinae
- Tribe: Odontiini
- Genus: Tegostoma
- Species: T. aequifascialis

Binomial name
- Tegostoma aequifascialis (Zerny in Rebel & Zerny, 1917)

Synonyms
- Endolophia aequifascialis Zerny in Rebel & Zerny, 1917

Species of moth

Tegostoma aequifascialis is a moth in the family Crambidae. It was described by Hans Zerny in 1917. It is found in Sudan.
