= Tegostoma concinnalis =

Scientific classification
- Domain: Eukaryota
- Kingdom: Animalia
- Phylum: Arthropoda
- Class: Insecta
- Order: Lepidoptera
- Family: Crambidae
- Subfamily: Odontiinae
- Tribe: Odontiini
- Genus: Tegostoma
- Species: T. concinnalis

Binomial name
- Tegostoma concinnalis (Christoph, 1882)

Synonyms
- Anthophilodes concinnalis Christoph, 1882

Species of moth

Tegostoma subterminalis is a moth in the family Crambidae. It was described by Hugo Theodor Christoph in 1882. It is found in Azerbaijan.
