= Tegostoma albinalis =

Scientific classification
- Domain: Eukaryota
- Kingdom: Animalia
- Phylum: Arthropoda
- Class: Insecta
- Order: Lepidoptera
- Family: Crambidae
- Subfamily: Odontiinae
- Tribe: Odontiini
- Genus: Tegostoma
- Species: T. albinalis

Binomial name
- Tegostoma albinalis Maes, 2004

Species of moth

Tegostoma albinalis is a moth in the family Crambidae. It was described by Koen V. N. Maes in 2004. It is found in Kenya, Namibia and South Africa.
