= Tegostoma millotalis =

Scientific classification
- Domain: Eukaryota
- Kingdom: Animalia
- Phylum: Arthropoda
- Class: Insecta
- Order: Lepidoptera
- Family: Crambidae
- Subfamily: Odontiinae
- Tribe: Odontiini
- Genus: Tegostoma
- Species: T. millotalis

Binomial name
- Tegostoma millotalis (Marion, 1956)

Synonyms
- Noorda millotalis Marion, 1956

Species of moth

Tegostoma millotalis is a moth in the family Crambidae. It was described by Hubert Marion in 1956. It is found on Madagascar.
