= Tegostoma bipartalis =

Scientific classification
- Domain: Eukaryota
- Kingdom: Animalia
- Phylum: Arthropoda
- Class: Insecta
- Order: Lepidoptera
- Family: Crambidae
- Subfamily: Odontiinae
- Tribe: Odontiini
- Genus: Tegostoma
- Species: T. bipartalis

Binomial name
- Tegostoma bipartalis Walsingham & Hampson, 1896

Synonyms
- Eublemma dichroma Rebel, 1907

Species of moth

Tegostoma bipartalis is a moth in the family Crambidae. It was described by Walsingham & Hampson in 1896. It is found in Kenya, South Africa and Yemen.
