= Tegostoma anaemica =

Scientific classification
- Domain: Eukaryota
- Kingdom: Animalia
- Phylum: Arthropoda
- Class: Insecta
- Order: Lepidoptera
- Family: Crambidae
- Subfamily: Odontiinae
- Tribe: Odontiini
- Genus: Tegostoma
- Species: T. anaemica

Binomial name
- Tegostoma anaemica Hampson, 1913

Species of moth

Tegostoma anaemica is a moth in the family Crambidae. It was described by George Hampson in 1913. It is found in Pakistan.
