= Tegostoma subterminalis =

Scientific classification
- Domain: Eukaryota
- Kingdom: Animalia
- Phylum: Arthropoda
- Class: Insecta
- Order: Lepidoptera
- Family: Crambidae
- Subfamily: Odontiinae
- Tribe: Odontiini
- Genus: Tegostoma
- Species: T. subterminalis

Binomial name
- Tegostoma subterminalis Hampson, 1918

Species of moth

Tegostoma subterminalis is a moth in the family Crambidae. It was described by George Hampson in 1918. It is found in South Africa and Namibia.
