= Zenamorpha =

Scientific classification
- Kingdom: Animalia
- Phylum: Arthropoda
- Clade: Pancrustacea
- Class: Insecta
- Order: Lepidoptera
- Family: Crambidae
- Subfamily: Spilomelinae
- Genus: Zenamorpha; Amsel, 1956
- Species: Z. discophoralis

Binomial name
- Zenamorpha discophoralis (Hampson, 1899)

Synonyms
- Ischnurges discophoralis Hampson, 1899

Genus of moths

Zenamorpha is a monotypic moth genus of the family Crambidae described by Hans Georg Amsel in 1956. Its single species, Zenamorpha discophoralis, described by George Hampson in 1899, is found in Orizaba, Mexico.

== Former species ==
- Zenamorpha pseudonoctua (Rothschild, 1921)
