= Tegostoma confluentalis =

Scientific classification
- Domain: Eukaryota
- Kingdom: Animalia
- Phylum: Arthropoda
- Class: Insecta
- Order: Lepidoptera
- Family: Crambidae
- Subfamily: Odontiinae
- Tribe: Odontiini
- Genus: Tegostoma
- Species: T. confluentalis

Binomial name
- Tegostoma confluentalis Hampson, 1913

Synonyms
- Tegostoma ahwazalis Amsel, 1949

Species of moth

Tegostoma confluentalis is a moth in the family Crambidae. It was described by George Hampson in 1913. It is found in Egypt and Iran.

The wingspan is about 26 mm. The forewings are reddish brown, suffused with white at the base and with a white costal edge. The medial band is white and the postmedial line is yellowish white. The hindwings are white, slightly tinged with brown.
