= Tegostoma zachlora =

Scientific classification
- Domain: Eukaryota
- Kingdom: Animalia
- Phylum: Arthropoda
- Class: Insecta
- Order: Lepidoptera
- Family: Crambidae
- Subfamily: Odontiinae
- Tribe: Odontiini
- Genus: Tegostoma
- Species: T. zachlora

Binomial name
- Tegostoma zachlora (Meyrick, 1891)

Synonyms
- Titanio zachlora Meyrick, 1891; Noctuelia zachlora

Species of moth

Tegostoma zachlora is a moth in the family Crambidae. It was described by Edward Meyrick in 1891. It is found in Algeria.
