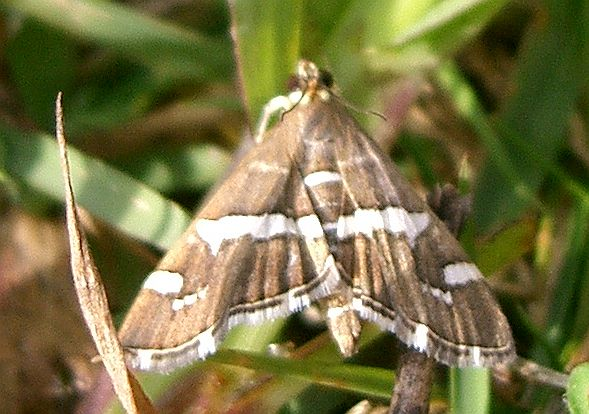
- Spoladea recurvalis

Scientific classification
- Kingdom: Animalia
- Phylum: Arthropoda
- Class: Insecta
- Order: Lepidoptera
- Family: Crambidae
- Tribe: Hymeniini
- Genus: Spoladea; Guenée, 1854

= Spoladea =

Genus of moths

Spoladea is a genus of moths of the family Crambidae described by Achille Guenée in 1854.

== Species ==
- Spoladea mimetica Munroe, 1974
- Spoladea recurvalis (Fabricius, 1775)
