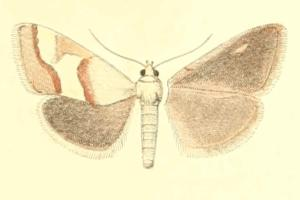

Scientific classification
- Domain: Eukaryota
- Kingdom: Animalia
- Phylum: Arthropoda
- Class: Insecta
- Order: Lepidoptera
- Family: Crambidae
- Subfamily: Odontiinae
- Tribe: Odontiini
- Genus: Tegostoma; Zeller, 1847

Synonyms
- Anthophilodes Guenée, 1854; Anthophilopsis Ragonot, 1891; Pelaea Lederer, 1863

= Tegostoma =

Genus of moths

Tegostoma is a genus of moths of the family Crambidae.

== Species ==
- Tegostoma aequifascialis (Zerny in Rebel & Zerny, 1917)
- Tegostoma albinalis Maes, 2004
- Tegostoma albizonalis Hampson, 1900
- Tegostoma anaemica Hampson, 1913
- Tegostoma anaemicalis (Hampson, 1900)
- Tegostoma aridalis Mey, 2011
- Tegostoma baphialis (Staudinger, 1871)
- Tegostoma bipartalis Hampson in Walsingham & Hampson, 1896
- Tegostoma comparalis (Hübner, 1796)
- Tegostoma concinnalis (Christoph, 1882)
- Tegostoma confluentalis Hampson, 1913
- Tegostoma embale Caradja, 1928
- Tegostoma flavida (Moore, 1881)
- Tegostoma florilegaria Guenée, 1857
- Tegostoma kenrickalis Marion & Viette, 1956
- Tegostoma lepidalis (Herrich-Schäffer, 1851)
- Tegostoma marginalis Amsel, 1961
- Tegostoma millotalis (Marion, 1956)
- Tegostoma moeschleri (Christoph, 1862)
- Tegostoma mossulalis Amsel, 1949
- Tegostoma praestantalis (D. Lucas, 1943)
- Tegostoma pseudonoctua (Rothschild, 1921)
- Tegostoma richteri Amsel, 1963
- Tegostoma ruptilineale Zerny, 1914
- Tegostoma sarobiella Amsel, 1970
- Tegostoma stangei Zerny, 1916
- Tegostoma subditalis Zeller, 1852
- Tegostoma subterminalis Hampson, 1918
- Tegostoma uniforma Amsel, 1951
- Tegostoma zachlora (Meyrick, 1891)
