= Tegostoma aridalis =

Scientific classification
- Kingdom: Animalia
- Phylum: Arthropoda
- Clade: Pancrustacea
- Class: Insecta
- Order: Lepidoptera
- Family: Crambidae
- Subfamily: Odontiinae
- Tribe: Odontiini
- Genus: Tegostoma
- Species: T. aridalis

Binomial name
- Tegostoma aridalis Mey, 2011

Species of moth

Tegostoma aridalis is a moth in the family Crambidae. It was described by Wolfram Mey in 2011. It is found in Namibia and South Africa.
