= Tegostoma kenrickalis =

Scientific classification
- Domain: Eukaryota
- Kingdom: Animalia
- Phylum: Arthropoda
- Class: Insecta
- Order: Lepidoptera
- Family: Crambidae
- Subfamily: Odontiinae
- Tribe: Odontiini
- Genus: Tegostoma
- Species: T. kenrickalis

Binomial name
- Tegostoma kenrickalis Marion & Viette, 1956

Synonyms
- Mabilleodes kenrickalis (Marion & Viette, 1956)

Species of moth

Tegostoma kenrickalis is a moth in the family Crambidae. It was described by Hubert Marion and Pierre Viette in 1956. It is found on Madagascar.
