= Tegostoma subditalis =

Scientific classification
- Domain: Eukaryota
- Kingdom: Animalia
- Phylum: Arthropoda
- Class: Insecta
- Order: Lepidoptera
- Family: Crambidae
- Subfamily: Odontiinae
- Tribe: Odontiini
- Genus: Tegostoma
- Species: T. subditalis

Binomial name
- Tegostoma subditalis Zeller, 1852

Species of moth

Tegostoma subditalis is a moth in the family Crambidae. It was described by Zeller in 1852. It is found in Kenya and South Africa.
