= Hymenia lophoceralis =

Scientific classification
- Kingdom: Animalia
- Phylum: Arthropoda
- Class: Insecta
- Order: Lepidoptera
- Family: Crambidae
- Genus: Hymenia
- Species: H. lophoceralis

Binomial name
- Hymenia lophoceralis (Hampson, 1912)

Synonyms
- Zinckenia lophoceralis Hampson, 1912

Species of moth

Hymenia lophoceralis is a moth in the family Crambidae. It was described by George Hampson in 1912. It is found on New Guinea.
