= Tegostoma pseudonoctua =

Scientific classification
- Domain: Eukaryota
- Kingdom: Animalia
- Phylum: Arthropoda
- Class: Insecta
- Order: Lepidoptera
- Family: Crambidae
- Subfamily: Odontiinae
- Tribe: Odontiini
- Genus: Tegostoma
- Species: T. pseudonoctua

Binomial name
- Tegostoma pseudonoctua (Rothschild, 1921)

Synonyms
- Eublemma pseudonoctua Rothschild, 1921; Zenamorpha pseudonoctua

Species of moth

Tegostoma pseudonoctua is a moth in the family Crambidae. It was described by Rothschild in 1921. It is found in Niger.
