= Zagiridia =

Scientific classification
- Domain: Eukaryota
- Kingdom: Animalia
- Phylum: Arthropoda
- Class: Insecta
- Order: Lepidoptera
- Family: Crambidae
- Subfamily: Spilomelinae
- Genus: Zagiridia; Hampson, 1897

Genus of moths

Zagiridia is a genus of moths of the family Crambidae described by George Hampson in 1897.

== Species ==
- Zagiridia alamotralis Viette, 1973
- Zagiridia noctualis Hampson, 1897
