= Zeuzerobotys =

Scientific classification
- Kingdom: Animalia
- Phylum: Arthropoda
- Class: Insecta
- Order: Lepidoptera
- Family: Crambidae
- Subfamily: Spilomelinae
- Genus: Zeuzerobotys; Munroe, 1963
- Species: Z. mirabilis

Binomial name
- Zeuzerobotys mirabilis Munroe, 1963

Synonyms
- Zeurzerobotys Munroe, 1963

Genus of moths

Zeuzerobotys is a monotypic moth genus of the family Crambidae described by Eugene G. Munroe in 1963. Its only species, Zeuzerobotys mirabilis, described by the same author in the same year, is found in Hidalgo, Mexico.
