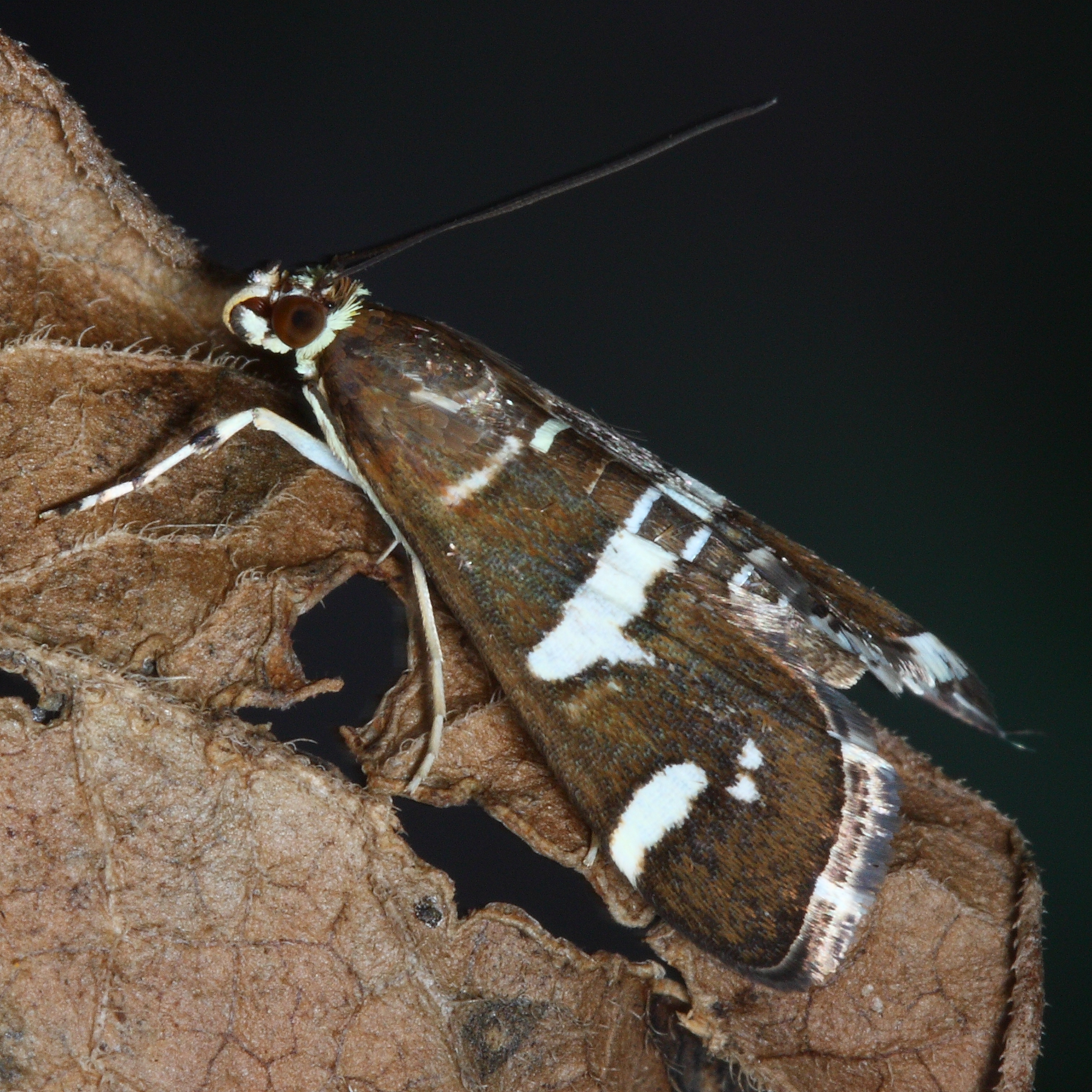

Scientific classification
- Domain: Eukaryota
- Kingdom: Animalia
- Phylum: Arthropoda
- Class: Insecta
- Order: Lepidoptera
- Family: Crambidae
- Genus: Spoladea
- Species: S. recurvalis

Binomial name
- Spoladea recurvalis (Fabricius, 1775)

Synonyms
- List: Phalaena recurvalis Fabricius, 1787; Zinckenia recurvalis; Phalaena Pyralis fascialis Stoll, in Cramer, 1782; Hymenia recurvalis; Hymenia exodias Meyrick, 1904; Hydrocampa albifacialis Boisduval, 1833; Hydrocampa albifascialis Boisduval, 1833; Hymenia diffascialis Hübner, 1825; Nacoleia ancylosema Dognin, 1909; Odezia hecate var. formosana Shiraki, 1910; Phalaena angustalis Fabricius, 1787; Phycis recurvella Zincken, 1818; Spoladea animalis Guenée, 1854

= Spoladea recurvalis =

Species of moth

Spoladea recurvalis, the beet webworm moth or Hawaiian beet webworm moth, is a species of moth of the family Crambidae. It is found worldwide, but mainly in the tropics.

The wingspan is 22–24 mm. The moth flies from May to September depending on the location.

The larvae feed on spinach, beet, cotton, maize and soybean. When fully grown, they are about 19 mm long.

== Gallery ==
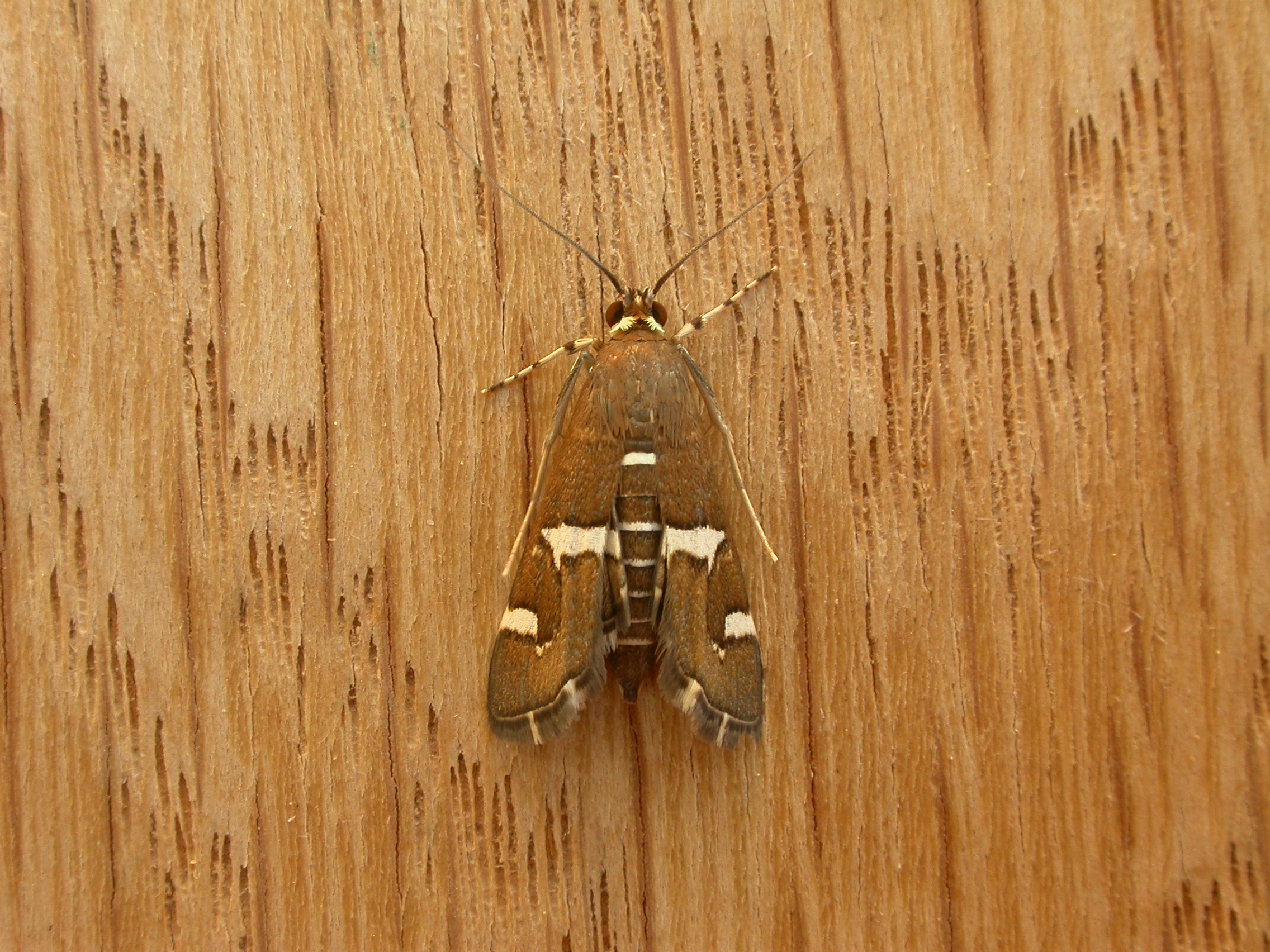
Spoladea recurvalis

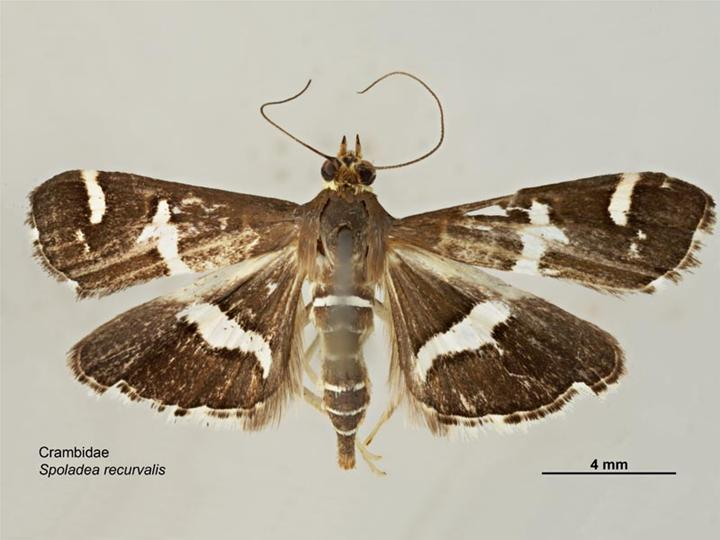
Dorsal view

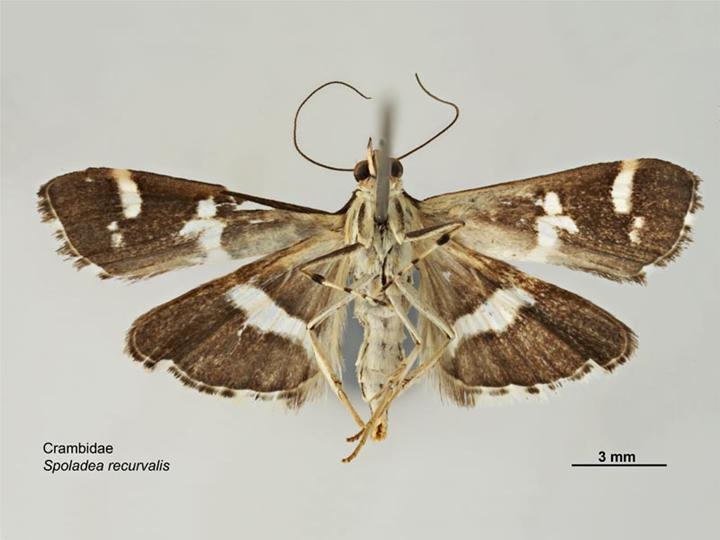
Ventral view

Spoladea recurvalis filmed in Tokyo, Japan (2016)
