= Spoladea mimetica =

Scientific classification
- Domain: Eukaryota
- Kingdom: Animalia
- Phylum: Arthropoda
- Class: Insecta
- Order: Lepidoptera
- Family: Crambidae
- Genus: Spoladea
- Species: S. mimetica

Binomial name
- Spoladea mimetica Munroe, 1974

Species of moth

Spoladea mimetica is a moth in the family Crambidae, found in New Guinea. It was described by Eugene G. Munroe in 1974.
