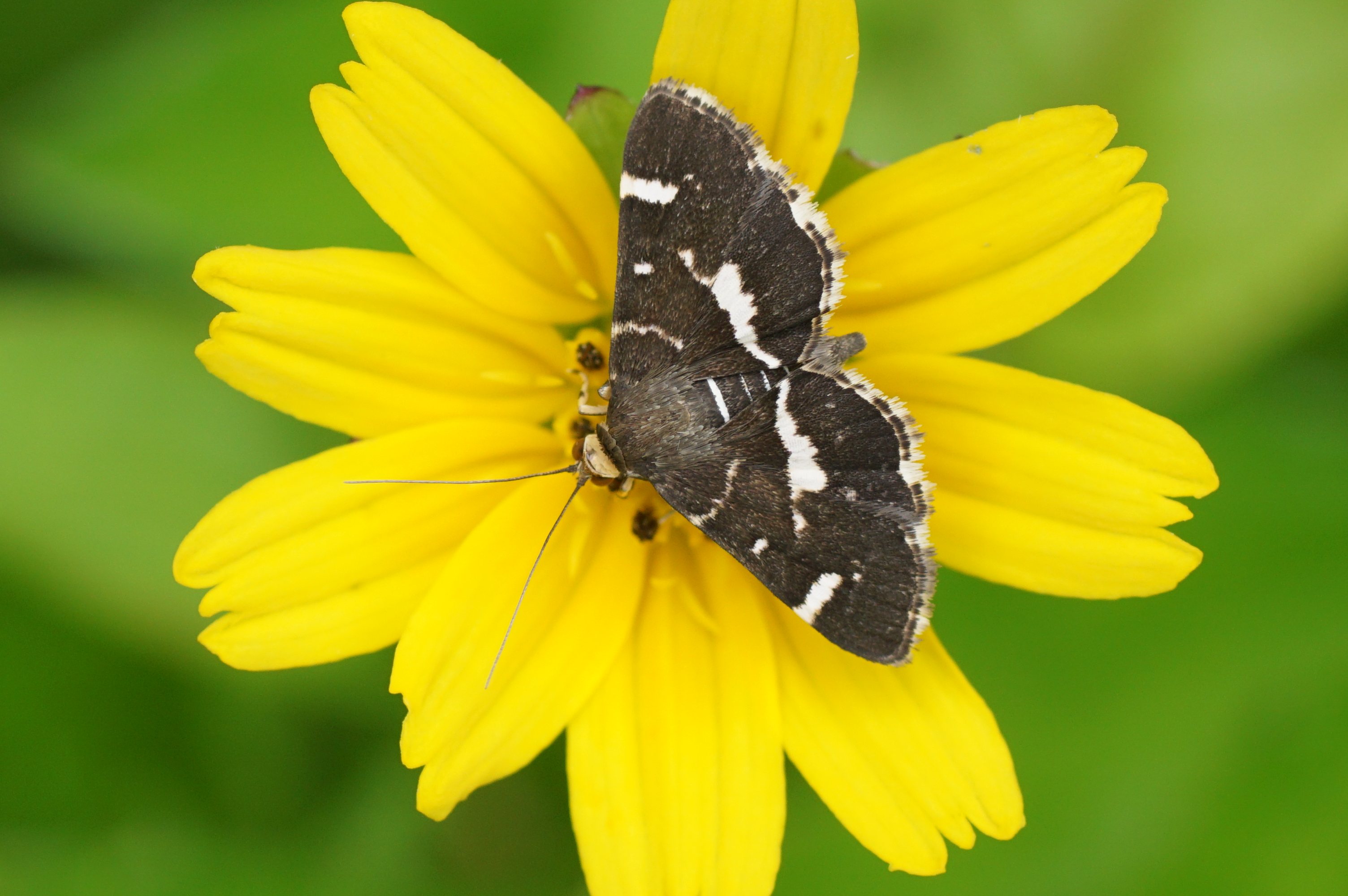

Scientific classification
- Domain: Eukaryota
- Kingdom: Animalia
- Phylum: Arthropoda
- Class: Insecta
- Order: Lepidoptera
- Family: Crambidae
- Genus: Hymenia
- Species: H. perspectalis

Binomial name
- Hymenia perspectalis (Hübner, 1796)

Synonyms
- Pyralis perspectalis Hübner, 1796; Zinckenia primordialis Zeller, 1852; Spoladea exportalis Guenée, 1854; Spoladea spilotalis Saalmüller, 1880; Desmia rhinthonalis Walker, 1859; Hymenia phrasiusalis Walker, 1859

= Hymenia perspectalis =

Species of moth

Hymenia perspectalis, the spotted beet webworm moth, is a species of moth of the family Crambidae. It is found in various parts of the world, including North America, where it is found from Maine to Florida, west to Texas and north to Michigan and Ontario. It is also found in Belize, Hong Kong, Jamaica, Australia (Queensland), the Comoros, Equatorial Guinea, Réunion and South Africa. The species was described by Jacob Hübner in 1796.

The wingspan is 16–22 mm. They are on wing from April to November.

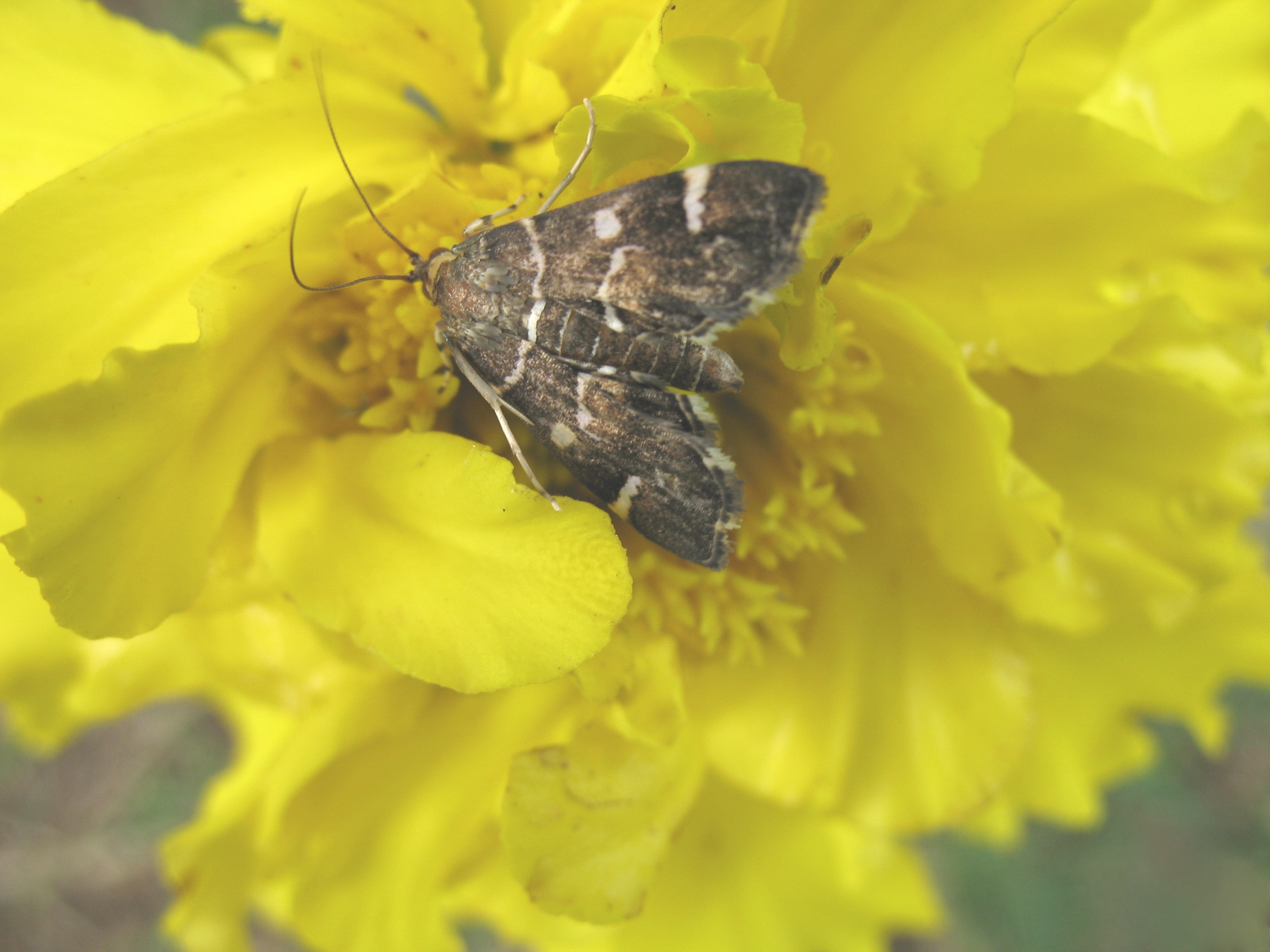

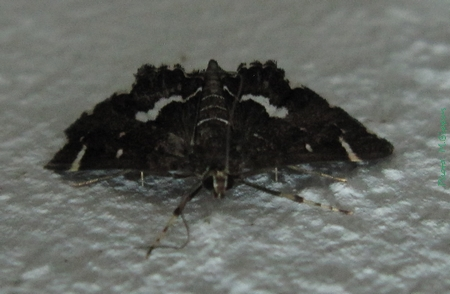

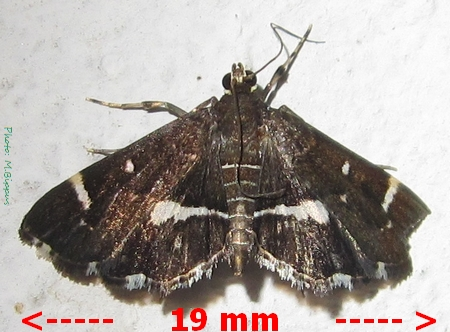
