= Hymenia nigerrimalis =

Scientific classification
- Kingdom: Animalia
- Phylum: Arthropoda
- Class: Insecta
- Order: Lepidoptera
- Family: Crambidae
- Genus: Hymenia
- Species: H. nigerrimalis

Binomial name
- Hymenia nigerrimalis (Hampson, 1900)

Synonyms
- Zinckenia nigerrimalis Hampson, 1900

Species of moth

Hymenia nigerrimalis is a moth in the family Crambidae (AKA "Crambid Snout Moths"). It was described by George Hampson in 1900. It is found on Christmas Island around 1,550 kilometres north-west of Australia.
