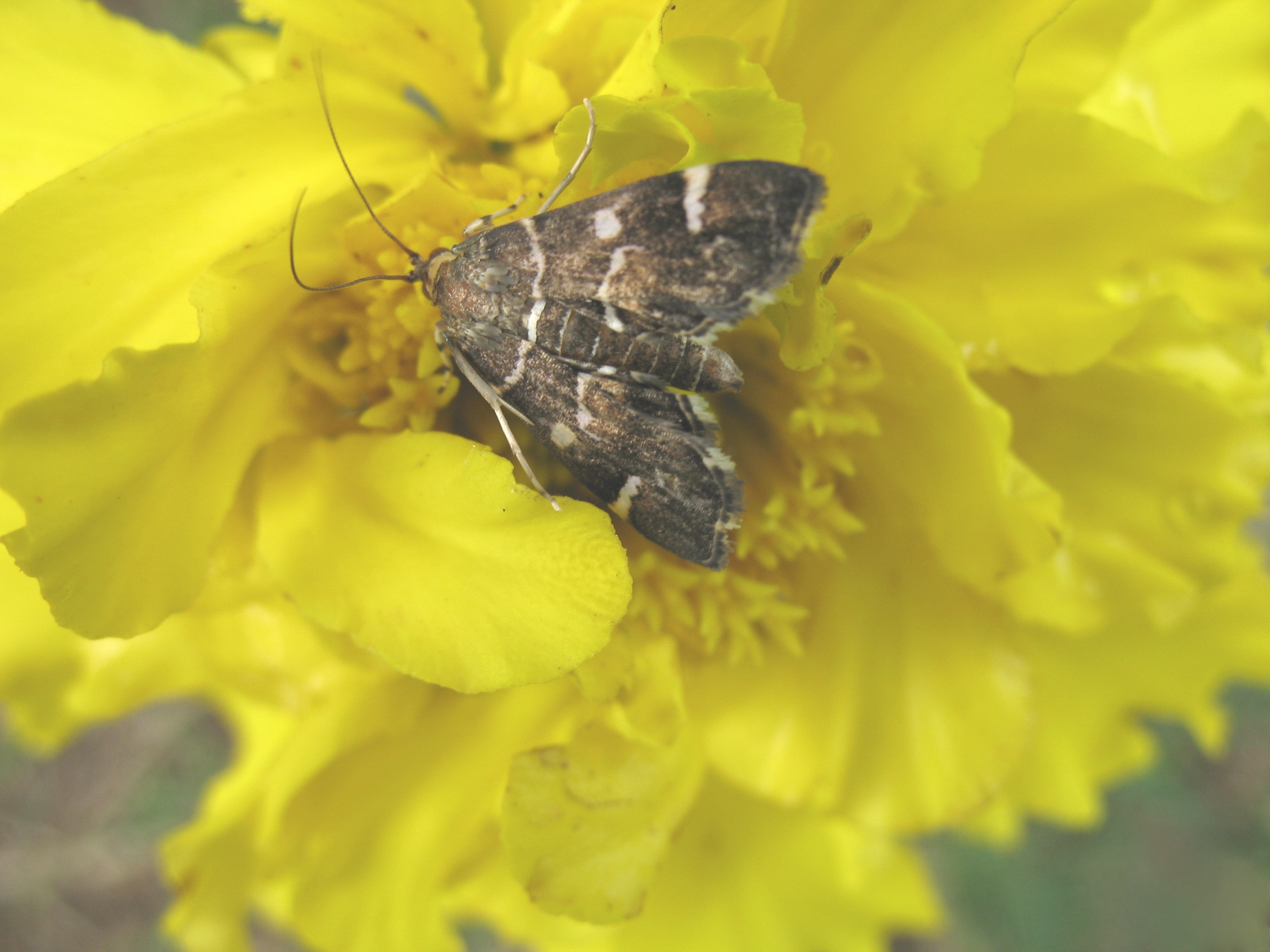

Scientific classification
- Domain: Eukaryota
- Kingdom: Animalia
- Phylum: Arthropoda
- Class: Insecta
- Order: Lepidoptera
- Family: Crambidae
- Genus: Hymenia; Hübner, 1825

Synonyms
- Zinckenia Zeller, 1852

= Hymenia =

Genus of moths

Hymenia is a genus of moths of the family Crambidae.

== Species ==
- Hymenia lophoceralis (Hampson, 1912)
- Hymenia nigerrimalis (Hampson, 1900)
- Hymenia perspectalis (Hübner, 1796)
