= Zacatecas ankasokellus =

Scientific classification
- Kingdom: Animalia
- Phylum: Arthropoda
- Class: Insecta
- Order: Lepidoptera
- Family: Crambidae
- Subfamily: Crambinae
- Tribe: incertae sedis
- Genus: Zacatecas; Bleszynski, 1962
- Species: Z. ankasokellus

Binomial name
- Zacatecas ankasokellus (Viette, 1960)

Synonyms
- Crambus ankasokellus Viette, 1960

Genus of moths

Zacatecas is a genus of moths of the family Crambidae. It contains only one species, Zacatecas ankasokellus, which is found in Madagascar.
