= List of moths of South Africa (Crambidae) =

This is a list of moths of the family Crambidae that are found in South Africa. It also acts as an index to the species articles and forms part of the full List of moths of South Africa.

- Achyra coelatalis (Walker, 1859)
- Achyra nudalis (Hübner, 1796)
- Adelpherupa typicosta (Meyrick, 1933)
- Aethaloessa floridalis (Zeller, 1852)
- Afroscoparia contemptalis (Walker, 1866)
- Agathodes incoloralis (Hampson, 1918)
- Agathodes modicalis Guenée, 1854
- Agathodes musivalis Guenée, 1854
- Agathodes ostentalis (Geyer, 1837)
- Agrotera citrina Hampson, 1898
- Agrotera fumosa Hampson, 1898
- Alphacrambus prodontellus (Hampson, 1919)
- Alphacrambus razowskii (Błeszyński, 1961)
- Ambia chalcichroalis Hampson, 1906
- Ambia melanalis Hampson, 1906
- Anania aurea (Butler, 1875)
- Anania fusalis (Hampson, 1912)
- Anania impunctata (Warren, 1897)
- Ancylolomia caffra Zeller, 1877
- Ancylolomia capensis Zeller, 1852
- Ancylolomia castaneata Hampson, 1919
- Ancylolomia lentifascialis Hampson, 1919
- Ancylolomia melanella Hampson, 1919
- Ancylolomia mirabilis Wallengren, 1876
- Ancylolomia pectinifera Hampson, 1910
- Ancylolomia perfasciata Hampson, 1919
- Ancylolomia planicosta Martin, 1956
- Ancylolomia prepiella Hampson, 1919
- Ancylolomia simplella de Joannis, 1913
- Angustalius hapaliscus (Zeller, 1852)
- Angustalius malacellus (Duponchel, 1836)
- Anomocrambus homerus Błeszyński, 1961
- Antigastra catalaunalis (Duponchel, 1833)
- Antigastra morysalis (Walker, 1859)
- Archernis flavidalis Hampson, 1908
- Argentochiloides meridionalis Bassi, 1999
- Argyractis capensis Hampson, 1906
- Argyractis nyasalis Hampson, 1917
- Argyractis nymphulalis Hampson, 1906
- Argyractis pentopalis Hampson, 1906
- Argyractis periopis Hampson, 1910
- Argyractis sambesica (Strand, 1909)
- Aurotalis nigrisquamalis (Hampson, 1919)
- Aurotalis similis Bassi, 1999
- Autocharis albiplaga (Hampson, 1913)
- Autocharis fessalis (Swinhoe, 1886)
- Autocharis jacobsalis (Marion & Viette, 1956)
- Autocharis sinualis (Hampson, 1899)
- Blepharucha zaide (Stoll, 1790)
- Bocchoris inspersalis (Zeller, 1852)
- Bocchoris nuclealis de Joannis, 1927
- Bocchoris onychinalis (Guenée, 1854)
- Botyodes asialis Guenée, 1854
- Bradina admixtalis (Walker, 1859)
- Bradina fasciculalis (Zeller, 1852)
- Brihaspa chrysostomus (Zeller, 1852)
- Cadarena sinuata (Fabricius, 1781)
- Caffrocrambus alcibiades Błeszyński, 1961
- Caffrocrambus decolorelloides Błeszyński, 1970
- Caffrocrambus decolorellus (Walker, 1863)
- Caffrocrambus dichotomellus (Hampson, 1919)
- Caffrocrambus endoxantha (Hampson, 1919)
- Caffrocrambus leucofascialis (Janse, 1922)
- Caffrocrambus ochreus Błeszyński, 1970
- Caffrocrambus undilineatus (Hampson, 1919)
- Calamochrous flavimarginalis Hampson, 1913
- Calamoschoena stictalis Hampson, 1919
- Calamotropha abjectella Snellen, 1872
- Calamotropha anticella (Walker, 1866)
- Calamotropha argenteociliella Pagenstecher, 1893
- Calamotropha bradleyi Błeszyński, 1960
- Calamotropha diakonoffi Błeszyński, 1961
- Calamotropha discellus (Walker, 1863)
- Calamotropha heliocaustus (Wallengren, 1876)
- Calamotropha paludella (Hübner, 1824)
- Calamotropha stachi Błeszyński, 1961
- Calamotropha torpidellus (Zeller, 1852)
- Calamotropha tripartitus (Hampson, 1919)
- Calamotropha wallengreni Błeszyński, 1961
- Calamotropha xanthypa Błeszyński, 1961
- Cangetta albiceps (Hampson, 1917)
- Cataclysta nyasalis Hampson, 1917
- Cataclysta perirrorata Hampson, 1917
- Charltona plurivittalis Hampson, 1910
- Charltona tritonella (Hampson, 1898)
- Chilo argyropasta (Hampson, 1919)
- Chilo orichalcociliella (Strand, 1911)
- Chilo partellus (Swinhoe, 1885)
- Chilo phaeosema Martin, 1958
- Chilo prophylactes (Meyrick, 1936)
- Chilo recalvus Wallengren, 1876
- Chrysocatharylla fusca Bassi, 1999
- Chrysocatharylla lucasi Schouten, 1994
- Chrysocatharylla oenescentellus (Hampson, 1896)
- Circobotys caffralis (Hampson, 1910)
- Cirrhochrista argentiplaga Warren, 1897
- Cirrhochrista grabczewskyi E. Hering, 1903
- Classeya argyrodonta (Hampson, 1910)
- Classeya trichelites (Meyrick, 1936)
- Cnaphalocrocis poeyalis (Boisduval, 1833)
- Cornifrons albidiscalis Hampson, 1916
- Cotachena octoguttalis (Felder & Rogenhofer, 1875)
- Cotachena smaragdina (Butler, 1875)
- Crambus archimedes Błeszyński, 1961
- Crambus argyrostola (Hampson, 1919)
- Crambus bellissimus Błeszyński, 1961
- Crambus ellipticellus Hampson, 1919
- Crambus lacteella Janse, 1922
- Crambus leucoschalis Hampson, 1898
- Crambus sectitermina Hampson, 1910
- Crambus sjoestedti Aurivillius, 1910
- Crambus sparsellus Walker, 1866
- Crambus tenuistriga Hampson, 1898
- Crambus themistocles Błeszyński, 1961
- Crambus uniformella Janse, 1922
- Crambus viettellus Błeszyński & Collins, 1962
- Crambus xebus Błeszyński, 1962
- Criophthona aridalis Hampson, 1913
- Criophthona sabulosalis Hampson, 1910
- Crocidolomia pavonana (Fabricius, 1794)
- Crypsiptya ruficostalis (Hampson, 1918)
- Culladia achroellum (Mabille, 1900)
- Culladia inconspicuellus (Snellen, 1872)
- Culladia serranella Błeszyński, 1970
- Culladiella sinuimargo (Hampson, 1919)
- Cybalomia squamosa (Hampson, 1913)
- Daulia auriplumbea (Warren, 1914)
- Daulia subaurealis (Walker, 1865)
- Desmia argyrosticta (Hampson, 1910)
- Deuterophysa grisealis Hampson, 1917
- Diaphana indica (Saunders, 1851)
- Diasemia disjectalis (Zeller, 1852)
- Diasemia monostigma Hampson, 1913
- Diasemia trigonialis Hampson, 1913
- Diasemiopsis ramburialis (Duponchel, 1834)
- Diastictis incisalis (Snellen, 1880)
- Diastictis tenera (Butler, 1883)
- Dipleurinodes phaeopalpia (Hampson, 1917)
- Dolicharthria bruguieralis (Duponchel, 1833)
- Dolicharthria desertalis (Hampson, 1907)
- Dolicharthria lanceolalis (Guenée, 1854)
- Dolicharthria paediusalis (Walker, 1859)
- Dolicharthria signatalis (Zeller, 1852)
- Donacaula ignitalis (Hampson, 1919)
- Donacaula phaeopastalis (Hampson, 1919)
- Duponchelia fovealis Zeller, 1847
- Dysallacta negatalis (Walker, 1859)
- Elophila africalis (Hampson, 1906)
- Elophila circealis (Walker, 1859)
- Epascestria argyrostacta (Hampson, 1910)
- Epascestria croesusalis (Hampson, 1913)
- Epascestria distictalis (Hampson, 1913)
- Epascestria euprepialis (Hampson, 1913)
- Epascestria microdontalis (Hampson, 1913)
- Epascestria pictalis (Hampson, 1913)
- Epipagis cancellalis (Zeller, 1852)
- Epipagis roseocinctalis (Hampson, 1913)
- Euchromius discopis (Hampson, 1919)
- Euchromius klimeschi Błeszyński, 1961
- Euchromius mythus Błeszyński, 1970
- Euchromius nigrobasalis Schouten, 1988
- Euchromius ocellea (Haworth, 1811)
- Euclasta bacescui Popescu-Gorj & Constantinescu, 1977
- Euclasta pauli Popescu-Gorj & Constantinescu, 1973
- Euclasta varii Popescu-Gorj & Constantinescu, 1973
- Euclasta warreni Distant, 1892
- Eudonia gracilineata Nuss, 2000
- Eurrhyparodes bracteolalis (Zeller, 1852)
- Eurrhyparodes tricoloralis (Zeller, 1852)
- Eusabena miltochristalis (Hampson, 1896)
- Evergestis africalis (Guenée, 1854)
- Evergestis forficalis (Linnaeus, 1758)
- Filodes costivitralis Guenée, 1862
- Ghesquierellana hirtusalis (Walker, 1859)
- Glaucocharis natalensis (Hampson, 1919)
- Glaucocharis subnatalensis (Błeszyński, 1970)
- Glyphodes aniferalis Hampson, 1909
- Glyphodes basifascialis Hampson, 1898
- Glyphodes bicolor (Swainson, 1821)
- Glyphodes bitriangulalis Gaede, 1917
- Glyphodes capensis (Walker, 1866)
- Glyphodes chrysialis (Stoll, 1790)
- Glyphodes praefulgida Hering, 1903
- Glyphodes pyloalis Walker, 1859
- Glyphodes quadrinalis (Guenée, 1854)
- Glyphodes shafferorum Viette, 1987
- Glyphodes stolalis Guenée, 1854
- Haimbachia aculeata (Hampson, 1903)
- Haimbachia albiceps (Hampson, 1919)
- Haimbachia fuscicilia (Hampson, 1910)
- Haimbachia proaraealis (Błeszyński, 1961)
- Haimbachia unipunctalis (Hampson, 1919)
- Haritalodes derogata (Fabricius, 1775)
- Heliothela ophideresana (Walker, 1863)
- Hellula undalis (Fabricius, 1781)
- Herpetogramma licarsisalis (Walker, 1859)
- Herpetogramma mutualis (Zeller, 1852)
- Herpetogramma phaeopteralis (Guenée, 1854)

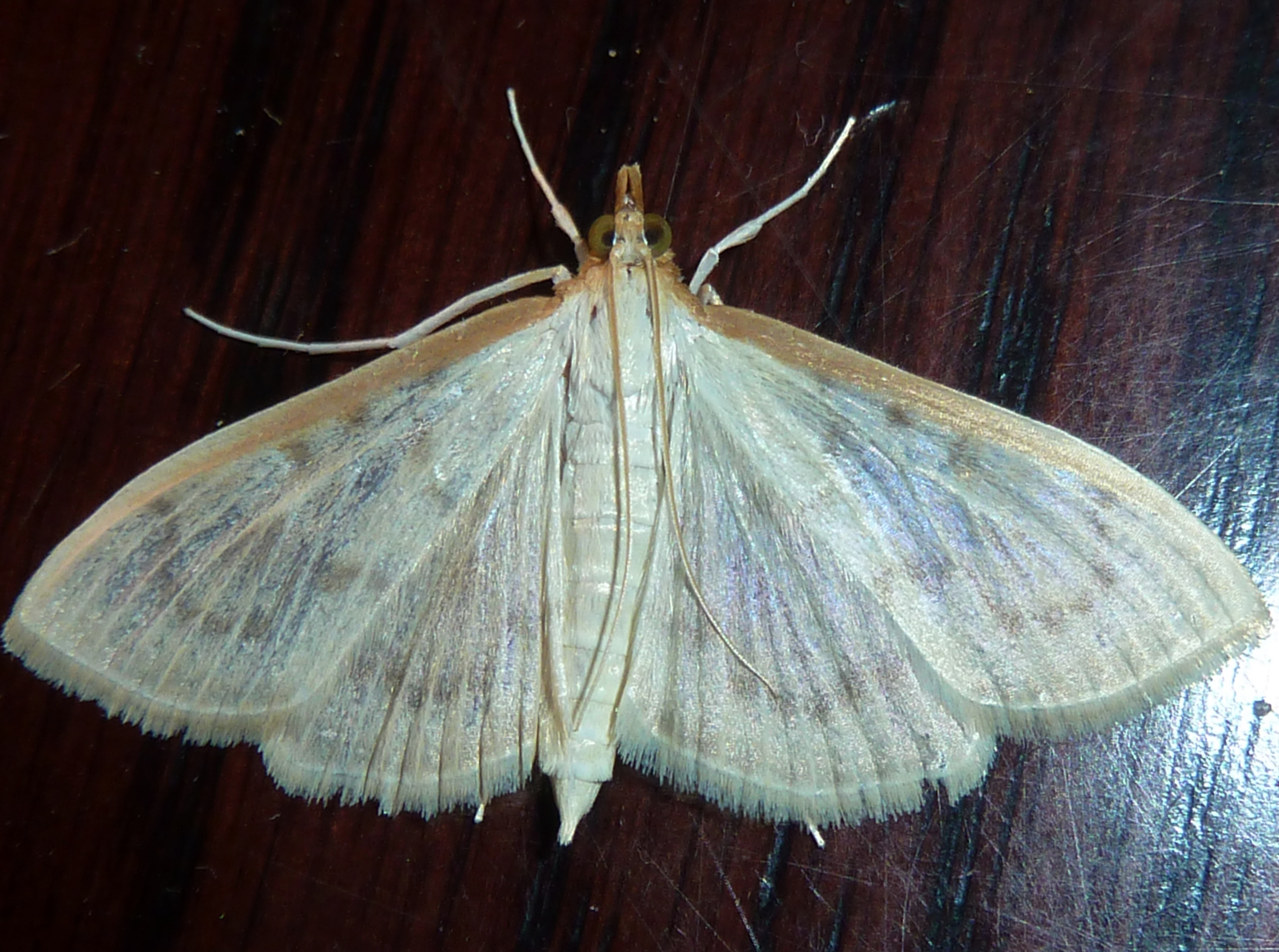
cf. Hodebertia testalis

- Hodebertia testalis (Fabricius, 1794)
- Hyalobathra charopalis Swinhoe, 1907
- Hyalobathra metallogramma Meyrick, 1934
- Hyalobathra retinalis (Saalmüller, 1879)
- Hydriris ornatalis (Duponchel, 1832)
- Hymenia perspectalis (Hübner, 1796)
- Hymenoptychis sordida Zeller, 1852
- Ischnurges lancinalis (Guenée, 1854)
- Ischnurges rhodographalis Hampson, 1913
- Knysna jansei Bassi, 1999
- Lamprophaia ablactalis (Walker, 1859)
- Lamprosema hottentota Hampson, 1918
- Lamprosema ommatalis (Hampson, 1912)
- Leonardo davincii Błeszyński, 1965
- Leucinodes longipalpis (Warren, 1892)
- Leucinodes orbonalis Guenée, 1854
- Leucinodes translucidalis Gaede, 1917
- Leucinodes vagans (Tutt, 1890)
- Loxophantis pretoriella Błeszyński, 1970
- Loxostege frustalis (Zeller, 1852)
- Loxostege lacunalis (Zeller, 1852)
- Loxostege oblinalis (Felder & Rogenhofer, 1875)
- Loxostege plumbatalis (Zeller, 1852)
- Loxostege venustalis (Cramer, 1782)
- Luma flavimarginalis Hampson, 1907
- Luma holoxantha Hampson, 1907
- Lygropia anaemicalis Hampson, 1912
- Lygropia atrinervalis Hampson, 1910
- Lygropia nigricornis Hampson, 1898
- Lygropia pogonodes Hampson, 1912
- Lygropia straminea Hampson, 1912
- Lygropia tetraspilalis Hampson, 1912
- Marasmia binalis (Zeller, 1852)
- Maruca vitrata (Fabricius, 1787)
- Marwitzia dichocrocis (Hampson, 1913)
- Marwitzia polystidzalis (Hampson, 1918)
- Metasia eremialis Hampson, 1913
- Metasia holoxanthia Hampson, 1899
- Metasia profanalis (Walker, 1865)
- Metasia sinuifera Hampson, 1913
- Metoeca foedalis (Guenée, 1854)
- Mimorista pulchellalis Dyar, 1922
- Nausinoe geometralis (Guenée, 1854)
- Nausinoe piabilis (Wallengren, 1875)
- Neargyria persimilis Hampson, 1919
- Neostege holoxutha Hampson, 1910
- Noctuelia annuliferalis Hampson, 1913
- Nomophila africana Munroe, 1973
- Nomophila brevispinalis Munroe, 1973
- Nomophila incognita Viette, 1959
- Nomophila noctuella ([Denis & Schiffermüller], 1775)
- Noorda blitealis Walker, 1859
- Notarcha cassualis (Walker, 1859)
- Notarcha muscerdalis (Zeller, 1852)
- Notarcha obrinusalis (Walker, 1859)
- Notarcha quaternalis (Zeller, 1852)
- Notarcha temeratalis (Zeller, 1852)
- Obtusipalpis pardalis Hampson, 1896
- Omiodes indicata (Fabricius, 1775)
- Orphanostigma abruptalis (Walker, 1859)
- Orphanostigma fervidalis (Zeller, 1852)
- Orphanostigma latimarginalis (Walker, 1859)
- Ostrinia erythrialis (Hampson, 1913)
- Pagyda salvalis Walker, 1859
- Palpita actorionalis (Walker, 1859)
- Palpita bonjongalis (Plötz, 1880)
- Palpita claralis (Walker, 1865)
- Palpita elealis (Walker, 1859)
- Palpita lobisignalis (Hampson, 1918)
- Palpita metallata (Fabricius, 1781)
- Palpita prolausalis (Walker, 1859)
- Palpita stenocraspis (Butler, 1898)
- Palpita subjectalis (Lederer, 1863)
- Palpita unionalis (Hübner, 1796)
- Paracataclysta fuscalis (Hampson, 1896)
- Parapoynx affinialis Guenée, 1854
- Parapoynx diminutalis (Snellen, 1880)
- Parapoynx fluctuosalis (Zeller, 1852)
- Parapoynx stagnalis (Zeller, 1852)
- Paratraea obliquivalis (Hampson, 1918)
- Pardomima callixantha Martin, 1955
- Pardomima furcirenalis (Hampson, 1918)
- Pardomima phalarota (Meyrick, 1933)
- Pardomima zanclophora Martin, 1955
- Parerupa africana (Aurivillius, 1910)
- Parotis baldersalis (Walker, 1859)
- Parotis prasinalis (Saalmüller, 1880)
- Parotis prasinophila (Hampson, 1912)
- Parotis pyritalis (Hampson, 1912)
- Parotis squamopedalis (Guenée, 1854)
- Parotis vernalis (Hampson, 1912)
- Parotis zambesalis (Walker, 1912)
- Parthenodes angularis Hampson, 1897
- Parthenodes scotalis Hampson, 1906
- Paschiodes mesoleucalis Hampson, 1913
- Patissa frontalis (Walker, 1865)
- Patissa pulverea (Hampson, 1919)
- Patissa virginea (Zeller, 1852)
- Pediasia amandusella Błeszyński, 1969
- Pediasia contaminella (Hübner, 1796)
- Pediasia figuratellus (Walker, 1866)
- Pediasia fulvitinctellus (Hampson, 1896)
- Pediasia lucrecia Błeszyński, 1969
- Phostria albescentalis Hampson, 1918
- Piletocera flavalis Hampson, 1917
- Piletocera hemiphaealis (Hampson, 1907)
- Piletocera signiferalis (Wallengren, 1860)
- Pilocrocis glaucitalis Hampson, 1912
- Pilocrocis melastictalis Hampson, 1912
- Pilocrocis patagialis Hampson, 1909
- Pilocrocis pterygodia Hampson, 1912
- Pleuroptya aegrotalis (Zeller, 1852)
- Pleuroptya balteata (Fabricius, 1798)
- Pleuroptya paleacalis (Guenée, 1854)
- Polygrammodes phyllophila (Butler, 1878)
- Prionapteryx albiceps (Hampson, 1919)
- Prionapteryx albimaculalis (Hampson, 1919)
- Prionapteryx albofascialis (Hampson, 1919)
- Prionapteryx alternalis Maes, 2002
- Prionapteryx argentescens (Hampson, 1919)
- Prionapteryx brevivittalis Hampson, 1919
- Prionapteryx molybdella (Hampson, 1919)
- Prochoristis calamochroa (Hampson, 1919)
- Psara aprepia (Hampson, 1913)
- Psara atritermina (Hampson, 1913)
- Psara basalis (Walker, 1866)
- Psara pallidalis (Hampson, 1913)
- Pseudocatharylla angolica Błeszyński, 1964
- Pseudocatharylla auricinctalis (Walker, 1863)
- Pseudocatharylla calypso Bassi, 1999
- Pseudocatharylla flavipedellus (Zeller, 1852)
- Pseudocatharylla polyxena Błeszyński, 1964
- Pseudocatharylla xymena Błeszyński, 1964
- Pseudonoorda ecthaemata (Hampson, 1913)
- Pseudonoorda rubricostalis (Hampson, 1910)
- Ptochostola metascotiella Hampson, 1919
- Ptychopseustis lophopedalis (de Joannis, 1927)
- Pycnarmon albivittalis (Hampson, 1912)
- Pycnarmon cribrata (Fabricius, 1794)
- Pycnarmon diaphana (Cramer, 1779)
- Pycnarmon meritalis (Walker, 1859)
- Pygospila tyres (Cramer, 1780)
- Pyrausta admensalis (Walker, 1859)
- Pyrausta adsocialis (Zeller, 1852)
- Pyrausta albialis (Walker, 1859)
- Pyrausta apicalis (Hampson, 1913)
- Pyrausta bilineaterminalis Maes, 2009
- Pyrausta cinnamomealis (Wallengren, 1860)
- Pyrausta diatoma Hampson, 1913
- Pyrausta diniasalis (Walker, 1859)
- Pyrausta gemmiferalis (Zeller, 1852)
- Pyrausta haematidalis Hampson, 1913
- Pyrausta lithosialis Hampson, 1899
- Pyrausta olesialis (Walker, 1859)
- Pyrausta orbitalis (Felder & Rogenhofer, 1875)
- Pyrausta perfervidalis Hampson, 1913
- Pyrausta phaenicealis (Hübner, 1818)
- Pyrausta procillusalis (Walker, 1859)
- Pyrausta rufinalis (Felder & Rogenhofer, 1875)
- Pyrausta rufitincta Hampson, 1913
- Salbia haemorrhoidalis (Guenée, 1854)
- Sameodes cancellalis (Zeller, 1852)
- Sameodes microspilalis Hampson, 1913
- Sameodesma undilinealis Hampson, 1918
- Sameodesma xanthocraspia (Hampson, 1913)
- Sceliodes laisalis (Walker, 1859)
- Schoenobius attenuata Hampson, 1919
- Schoenobius caminarius Zeller, 1852
- Schoenobius forficella (Thunberg, 1794)
- Scirpophaga incertulas (Walker, 1863)
- Scirpophaga occidentella (Walker, 1863)
- Sebrus absconditus Bassi, 1995
- Sebrus pseudosparsellus (Błeszyński, 1961)
- Spoladea recurvalis (Fabricius, 1775)

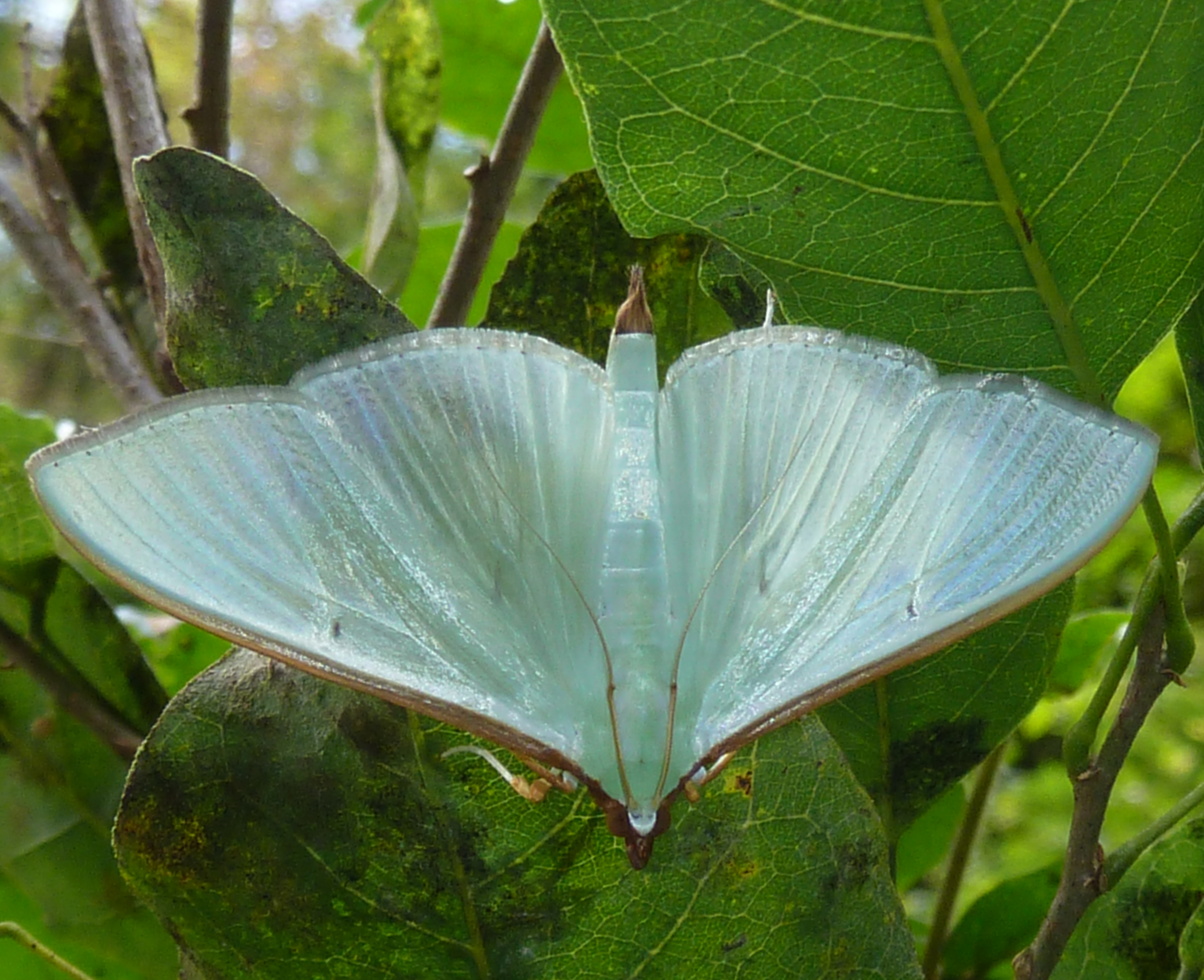
Stemorrhages sericea

- Stemorrhages sericea (Drury, 1773)
- Syllepte butlerii (Dewitz, 1881)
- Syllepte mesoleucalis Hampson, 1898
- Syllepte mysisalis (Walker, 1859)
- Syllepte nasonalis Hampson, 1898
- Syllepte orbiferalis Hampson, 1898
- Syllepte ovialis (Walker, 1859)
- Syllepte patagialis (Zeller, 1852)
- Syllepte polycymalis Hampson, 1912
- Syllepte purpurascens Hampson, 1899
- Syllepte rogationis Hampson, 1918
- Syllepte straminea (Butler, 1875)
- Syllepte trifidalis Hampson, 1908
- Syllepte xylocraspis (Hampson, 1912)
- Synclera traducalis (Zeller, 1852)
- Syngamia liquidalis (Zeller, 1852)
- Tegostoma bipartalis Hampson, 1896
- Tegostoma comparalis (Hübner, 1796)
- Tegostoma florilegarium (Guenée, 1857)
- Tegostoma subditalis Zeller, 1852
- Tegostoma subterminalis Hampson, 1918
- Terastia margaritis (Felder & Rogenhofer, 1875)
- Terastia meticulosalis Guenée, 1854
- Thliptoceras polygrammodes Hampson, 1899
- Trichophysetis flavimargo (Warren, 1897)
- Trichophysetis whitei Rebel, 1906
- Udea ferrugalis (Hübner, 1796)
- Udea hageni Viette, 1952
- Udea infuscalis (Zeller, 1852)
- Udeoides muscosalis (Hampson, 1913)
- Udeoides nolalis (Felder & Rogenhofer, 1875)
- Ulopeza conigeralis Zeller, 1852
- Ulopeza denticulalis Hampson, 1912
- Viettessa margaritalis (Hampson, 1910)
- Zebronia phenice (Cramer, 1780)
