= Argentochiloides xanthodorsellus =

Scientific classification
- Domain: Eukaryota
- Kingdom: Animalia
- Phylum: Arthropoda
- Class: Insecta
- Order: Lepidoptera
- Family: Crambidae
- Subfamily: Crambinae
- Tribe: incertae sedis
- Genus: Argentochiloides
- Species: A. xanthodorsellus

Binomial name
- Argentochiloides xanthodorsellus Błeszyński, 1961

Species of moth

Argentochiloides xanthodorsellus is a moth in the family Crambidae. It was described by Stanisław Błeszyński in 1961. It is found in Tanzania.
