= Argentochiloides =

Scientific classification
- Domain: Eukaryota
- Kingdom: Animalia
- Phylum: Arthropoda
- Class: Insecta
- Order: Lepidoptera
- Family: Crambidae
- Subfamily: Crambinae
- Tribe: incertae sedis
- Genus: Argentochiloides; Bleszynski, 1961

Synonyms
- Argentochilo Bleszynski & Collins, 1962

Genus of moths

Argentochiloides is a genus of moths of the family Crambidae.

== Species ==
- Argentochiloides meridionalis Bassi, 1999
- Argentochiloides xanthodorsellus Bleszynski, 1961
