= Calamotropha latellus =

Scientific classification
- Kingdom: Animalia
- Phylum: Arthropoda
- Clade: Pancrustacea
- Class: Insecta
- Order: Lepidoptera
- Family: Crambidae
- Subfamily: Crambinae
- Tribe: Calamotrophini
- Genus: Calamotropha
- Species: C. latellus

Binomial name
- Calamotropha latellus (Snellen, 1890)

Synonyms
- Crambus latellus Snellen, 1890

Species of moth

Calamotropha latellus is a moth in the family Crambidae. It was described by Snellen in 1890. It is found in India (Darjeeling).
