= Calamotropha virra =

Scientific classification
- Kingdom: Animalia
- Phylum: Arthropoda
- Clade: Pancrustacea
- Class: Insecta
- Order: Lepidoptera
- Family: Crambidae
- Subfamily: Crambinae
- Tribe: Calamotrophini
- Genus: Calamotropha
- Species: C. virra

Binomial name
- Calamotropha virra Błeszyński, 1966

Species of moth

Calamotropha virra is a moth in the family Crambidae. It was described by Stanisław Błeszyński in 1966. It is found in the Democratic Republic of the Congo.
