= Calamotropha megalopunctata =

Scientific classification
- Kingdom: Animalia
- Phylum: Arthropoda
- Clade: Pancrustacea
- Class: Insecta
- Order: Lepidoptera
- Family: Crambidae
- Subfamily: Crambinae
- Tribe: Calamotrophini
- Genus: Calamotropha
- Species: C. megalopunctata

Binomial name
- Calamotropha megalopunctata Błeszyński, 1961

Synonyms
- Calamotropha minuta Błeszyński, 1961

Species of moth

Calamotropha megalopunctata is a moth in the family Crambidae. It was described by Stanisław Błeszyński in 1961. It is found in Ghana, Sierra Leone and South Sudan.
