= Calamotropha robustella =

Scientific classification
- Kingdom: Animalia
- Phylum: Arthropoda
- Clade: Pancrustacea
- Class: Insecta
- Order: Lepidoptera
- Family: Crambidae
- Subfamily: Crambinae
- Tribe: Calamotrophini
- Genus: Calamotropha
- Species: C. robustella

Binomial name
- Calamotropha robustella Snellen, 1872

Species of moth

Calamotropha robustella is a moth in the family Crambidae. It was described by Snellen in 1872. It is found in Angola.
