= Calamotropha javaica =

Scientific classification
- Kingdom: Animalia
- Phylum: Arthropoda
- Clade: Pancrustacea
- Class: Insecta
- Order: Lepidoptera
- Family: Crambidae
- Subfamily: Crambinae
- Tribe: Calamotrophini
- Genus: Calamotropha
- Species: C. javaica

Binomial name
- Calamotropha javaica Błeszyński, 1961

Species of moth

Calamotropha javaica is a moth in the family Crambidae. It was described by Stanisław Błeszyński in 1961. It is found on Java.
