= Calamotropha oculalis =

Scientific classification
- Kingdom: Animalia
- Phylum: Arthropoda
- Clade: Pancrustacea
- Class: Insecta
- Order: Lepidoptera
- Family: Crambidae
- Subfamily: Crambinae
- Tribe: Calamotrophini
- Genus: Calamotropha
- Species: C. oculalis

Binomial name
- Calamotropha oculalis (Snellen, 1893)

Synonyms
- Crambus oculalis Snellen, 1893

Species of moth

Calamotropha oculalis is a moth in the family Crambidae. It was described by Samuel Constantinus Snellen van Vollenhoven in 1893. It is found on Java and Sri Lanka.

== Description ==
Its wingspan is 8 mm. The male is whitish. Palpi fulvous at sides except the third joint. Abdomen yellowish. Forewings with brown costa, with a broad fulvous fascia below it. An indistinct medial brown line oblique and highly angled below costa, then waved and with black specks on it at lower angle of cell and vein 2. A submarginal line double highly angled below costa, then obsolescent, sinuous and reduced to specks. The apex white with large brown spot. Three black specks on margin below middle. Cilia silvery. Ventral side of forewings suffused with fuscous.
