= Culladiella subsinuimargo =

Scientific classification
- Kingdom: Animalia
- Phylum: Arthropoda
- Clade: Pancrustacea
- Class: Insecta
- Order: Lepidoptera
- Family: Crambidae
- Genus: Culladiella
- Species: C. subsinuimargo

Binomial name
- Culladiella subsinuimargo Błeszyński, 1970

Species of moth

Culladiella subsinuimargo is a moth in the family Crambidae. It was described by Stanisław Błeszyński in 1970. It is found in Sudan.
