= Culladiella =

Scientific classification
- Kingdom: Animalia
- Phylum: Arthropoda
- Clade: Pancrustacea
- Class: Insecta
- Order: Lepidoptera
- Family: Crambidae
- Subfamily: Crambinae
- Tribe: Crambini
- Genus: Culladiella; Bleszynski, 1970

Genus of moths

Culladiella is a genus of moths of the family Crambidae.

== Species ==
- Culladiella acacia Schouten, 1993
- Culladiella anjai Schouten, 1993
- Culladiella generosus (Meyrick, 1936)
- Culladiella sinuimargo (Hampson, 1919)
- Culladiella subsinuimargo Bleszynski, 1970
