= Calamotropha niveicostellus =

Scientific classification
- Kingdom: Animalia
- Phylum: Arthropoda
- Clade: Pancrustacea
- Class: Insecta
- Order: Lepidoptera
- Family: Crambidae
- Subfamily: Crambinae
- Tribe: Calamotrophini
- Genus: Calamotropha
- Species: C. niveicostellus

Binomial name
- Calamotropha niveicostellus (Hampson, 1919)

Synonyms
- Crambus niveicostellus Hampson, 1919; Crambus niveicostalis Sjöstedt, 1926

Species of moth

Calamotropha niveicostellus is a moth in the family Crambidae. It was described by George Hampson in 1919. It is found in Kenya.
