= Calamotropha albistrigellus =

Scientific classification
- Kingdom: Animalia
- Phylum: Arthropoda
- Clade: Pancrustacea
- Class: Insecta
- Order: Lepidoptera
- Family: Crambidae
- Subfamily: Crambinae
- Tribe: Calamotrophini
- Genus: Calamotropha
- Species: C. albistrigellus

Binomial name
- Calamotropha albistrigellus (Hampson, 1896)

Synonyms
- Crambus albistrigellus Hampson, 1896

Species of moth

Calamotropha albistrigellus is a moth in the family Crambidae. It was described by George Hampson in 1896. It is found in Japan.
