= Calamotropha arachnophagus =

Scientific classification
- Kingdom: Animalia
- Phylum: Arthropoda
- Clade: Pancrustacea
- Class: Insecta
- Order: Lepidoptera
- Family: Crambidae
- Subfamily: Crambinae
- Tribe: Calamotrophini
- Genus: Calamotropha
- Species: C. arachnophagus

Binomial name
- Calamotropha arachnophagus (Strand, 1918)

Synonyms
- Crambus arachnophagus Strand, 1918

Species of moth

Calamotropha arachnophagus is a moth in the family Crambidae. It was described by Embrik Strand in 1918. It is found in Taiwan.
