= Lirabotys =

Scientific classification
- Domain: Eukaryota
- Kingdom: Animalia
- Phylum: Arthropoda
- Class: Insecta
- Order: Lepidoptera
- Family: Crambidae
- Subfamily: Pyraustinae
- Genus: Lirabotys; J. C. Shaffer & Munroe, 2007

Genus of moths

Lirabotys is a genus of moths of the family Crambidae.

== Species ==
- Lirabotys liralis (Legrand, 1966)
- Lirabotys prolausalis (Walker, 1859)
- Lirabotys rufitincta (Hampson, 1913)
