= Afroscoparia malutiensis =

Scientific classification
- Kingdom: Animalia
- Phylum: Arthropoda
- Clade: Pancrustacea
- Class: Insecta
- Order: Lepidoptera
- Family: Crambidae
- Genus: Afroscoparia
- Species: A. malutiensis

Binomial name
- Afroscoparia malutiensis Maes, 2004

Species of moth

Afroscoparia malutiensis is a moth in the family Crambidae. It was described by Koen V. N. Maes in 2004. It is found in Lesotho.
