= Afroscoparia =

Scientific classification
- Kingdom: Animalia
- Phylum: Arthropoda
- Clade: Pancrustacea
- Class: Insecta
- Order: Lepidoptera
- Family: Crambidae
- Genus: Afroscoparia; Nuss, 2003

Genus of moths

Afroscoparia is a genus of moths of the family Crambidae, the grass moths. It was established in 2003 to provide a new name for a Scoparia species, now Afroscoparia contemptalis. At the same time, A. australis was described.

== Species ==
- Afroscoparia australis Nuss, 2003
- Afroscoparia contemptalis (Walker, 1866)
- Afroscoparia malutiensis Maes, 2004
