= Panotima =

Scientific classification
- Domain: Eukaryota
- Kingdom: Animalia
- Phylum: Arthropoda
- Class: Insecta
- Order: Lepidoptera
- Family: Crambidae
- Subfamily: Musotiminae
- Genus: Panotima; Meyrick, 1934

Genus of moths

Panotima is a genus of moths of the family Crambidae.

== Species ==
- Panotima angularis (Hampson, 1897)
- Panotima copidosema Meyrick, 1934
- Panotima luculenta Ghesquière, 1942
- Panotima shafferi Viette, 1989
