= Calamotropha fulvifusalis =

Scientific classification
- Kingdom: Animalia
- Phylum: Arthropoda
- Clade: Pancrustacea
- Class: Insecta
- Order: Lepidoptera
- Family: Crambidae
- Subfamily: Crambinae
- Tribe: Calamotrophini
- Genus: Calamotropha
- Species: C. fulvifusalis

Binomial name
- Calamotropha fulvifusalis (Hampson, 1900)

Synonyms
- Crambus fulvifusalis Hampson, 1900; Calamotropha asagirii Okano, 1959; Crambus shibuyae Matsumura, 1927

Species of moth

Calamotropha fulvifusalis is a moth in the family Crambidae. It was described by George Hampson in 1900. It is found in Amur and Ussuri in the Russian Far East and Honshu and Hokkaido in Japan.
