= Calamotropha lupatus =

Scientific classification
- Kingdom: Animalia
- Phylum: Arthropoda
- Clade: Pancrustacea
- Class: Insecta
- Order: Lepidoptera
- Family: Crambidae
- Subfamily: Crambinae
- Tribe: Calamotrophini
- Genus: Calamotropha
- Species: C. lupatus

Binomial name
- Calamotropha lupatus (Meyrick, 1932)

Synonyms
- Crambus lupatus Meyrick, 1932

Species of moth

Calamotropha lupatus is a moth in the family Crambidae. It was described by Edward Meyrick in 1932. It is found in India and Iran.
