= Calamotropha dielota =

Scientific classification
- Kingdom: Animalia
- Phylum: Arthropoda
- Clade: Pancrustacea
- Class: Insecta
- Order: Lepidoptera
- Family: Crambidae
- Subfamily: Crambinae
- Tribe: Calamotrophini
- Genus: Calamotropha
- Species: C. dielota

Binomial name
- Calamotropha dielota Meyrick, 1886

Synonyms
- Calamotropha dielolus Hua, 2005

Species of moth

Calamotropha dielota is a moth in the family Crambidae. It was described by Edward Meyrick in 1886. It is found on Fiji.
