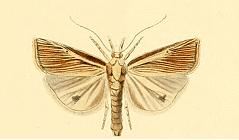

Scientific classification
- Kingdom: Animalia
- Phylum: Arthropoda
- Clade: Pancrustacea
- Class: Insecta
- Order: Lepidoptera
- Family: Crambidae
- Subfamily: Crambinae
- Tribe: Calamotrophini
- Genus: Calamotropha
- Species: C. hierichuntica

Binomial name
- Calamotropha hierichuntica Zeller, 1867

Synonyms
- Calamotropha hackeri Ganev, 1985; Calamotropha orontella Ragonot, 1895; Crambus leucaniellus Zerny, 1914; Calamotropha hierochuntica Christoph, 1876

= Calamotropha hierichuntica =

Species of moth

Calamotropha hierichuntica is a species of moth in the family Crambidae described by Philipp Christoph Zeller in 1867. It is found in Greece, Israel, Jordan and Syria.

The forewings are luteous (muddy) grey. The hindwings are pale grey, with a darker blotch before the middle of the hindmargin.
