= Calamotropha tonsalis =

Scientific classification
- Kingdom: Animalia
- Phylum: Arthropoda
- Clade: Pancrustacea
- Class: Insecta
- Order: Lepidoptera
- Family: Crambidae
- Subfamily: Crambinae
- Tribe: Calamotrophini
- Genus: Calamotropha
- Species: C. tonsalis

Binomial name
- Calamotropha tonsalis (Walker, 1863)

Synonyms
- Myeza tonsalis Walker, 1863; Crambus albidorsatus Hampson, 1919

Species of moth

Calamotropha tonsalis is a moth in the family Crambidae. It was described by Francis Walker in 1863. It is found on Borneo and in Singapore.
