= Calamotropha fuscilineatellus =

Scientific classification
- Kingdom: Animalia
- Phylum: Arthropoda
- Clade: Pancrustacea
- Class: Insecta
- Order: Lepidoptera
- Family: Crambidae
- Subfamily: Crambinae
- Tribe: Calamotrophini
- Genus: Calamotropha
- Species: C. fuscilineatellus

Binomial name
- Calamotropha fuscilineatellus (D. Lucas, 1938)

Synonyms
- Crambus fuscilineatellus D. Lucas, 1938; Calamotropha fuscilinieatella

Species of moth

Calamotropha fuscilineatellus is a species of moth in the family Crambidae. It was described by Daniel Lucas in 1938 and is found in Portugal, on Sardinia and in Morocco.
