= Panotima shafferi =

Scientific classification
- Kingdom: Animalia
- Phylum: Arthropoda
- Class: Insecta
- Order: Lepidoptera
- Family: Crambidae
- Genus: Panotima
- Species: P. shafferi

Binomial name
- Panotima shafferi Viette, 1989

Species of moth

Panotima shafferi is a moth in the family Crambidae. It was described by Viette in 1989. It is found in Madagascar.
