= Marwitzia centiguttalis =

Scientific classification
- Kingdom: Animalia
- Phylum: Arthropoda
- Class: Insecta
- Order: Lepidoptera
- Family: Crambidae
- Genus: Marwitzia
- Species: M. centiguttalis

Binomial name
- Marwitzia centiguttalis Gaede, 1917

Species of moth

Marwitzia centiguttalis is a moth in the family Crambidae. It was described by Max Gaede in 1917. It is found in Tanzania.
