= Lirabotys liralis =

Scientific classification
- Kingdom: Animalia
- Phylum: Arthropoda
- Class: Insecta
- Order: Lepidoptera
- Family: Crambidae
- Genus: Lirabotys
- Species: L. liralis

Binomial name
- Lirabotys liralis (Legrand, 1966)

Synonyms
- Bradina liralis Legrand, 1966

Species of moth

Lirabotys liralis is a moth in the family Crambidae. It was described by Henry Legrand in 1966. It is found on Aldabra in the Seychelles.
