= Calamotropha doii =

Scientific classification
- Kingdom: Animalia
- Phylum: Arthropoda
- Clade: Pancrustacea
- Class: Insecta
- Order: Lepidoptera
- Family: Crambidae
- Subfamily: Crambinae
- Tribe: Calamotrophini
- Genus: Calamotropha
- Species: C. doii

Binomial name
- Calamotropha doii Sasaki, 1997

Species of moth

Calamotropha doii is a moth in the family Crambidae. It was described by Sasaki in 1997. It is found in Japan (Honshu).
