= Afroscoparia australis =

Scientific classification
- Kingdom: Animalia
- Phylum: Arthropoda
- Clade: Pancrustacea
- Class: Insecta
- Order: Lepidoptera
- Family: Crambidae
- Genus: Afroscoparia
- Species: A. australis

Binomial name
- Afroscoparia australis Nuss, 2003

Species of moth

Afroscoparia australis is a moth in the family Crambidae. It was described by Nuss in 2003. It is found in Lesotho and South Africa (southern Cape Province, Transvaal). The habitat consists of montane and alpine areas.

The length of the forewings is 8–9 mm for males and 6.5–8.5 mm for females.

== Etymology ==
The species name refers to the occurrence in different parts of southern Africa and is derived from Latin australis (meaning south).
