= Calamotropha psaltrias =

Scientific classification
- Kingdom: Animalia
- Phylum: Arthropoda
- Clade: Pancrustacea
- Class: Insecta
- Order: Lepidoptera
- Family: Crambidae
- Subfamily: Crambinae
- Tribe: Calamotrophini
- Genus: Calamotropha
- Species: C. psaltrias

Binomial name
- Calamotropha psaltrias (Meyrick, 1933)

Synonyms
- Crambus psaltrias Meyrick, 1933

Species of moth

Calamotropha psaltrias is a moth in the family Crambidae. It was described by Edward Meyrick in 1933. It is found in the Democratic Republic of the Congo.
