= Calamotropha toxophorus =

Scientific classification
- Kingdom: Animalia
- Phylum: Arthropoda
- Clade: Pancrustacea
- Class: Insecta
- Order: Lepidoptera
- Family: Crambidae
- Subfamily: Crambinae
- Tribe: Calamotrophini
- Genus: Calamotropha
- Species: C. toxophorus

Binomial name
- Calamotropha toxophorus (de Joannis, 1927)

Synonyms
- Crambus toxophorus de Joannis, 1927

Species of moth

Calamotropha toxophorus is a moth in the family Crambidae. It was described by Joseph de Joannis in 1927. It is found in Mozambique.
