= Calamotropha brevilinellus =

Scientific classification
- Kingdom: Animalia
- Phylum: Arthropoda
- Clade: Pancrustacea
- Class: Insecta
- Order: Lepidoptera
- Family: Crambidae
- Subfamily: Crambinae
- Tribe: Calamotrophini
- Genus: Calamotropha
- Species: C. brevilinellus

Binomial name
- Calamotropha brevilinellus (South in Leech & South, 1901)

Synonyms
- Crambus brevilinellus South in Leech & South, 1901; Crambus brevilineellus Caradja, 1932; Crambus brevilineelus Caradja, 1931

Species of moth

Calamotropha brevilinellus is a moth in the family Crambidae. It was described by South in 1901. It is found in China.
