= Calamotropha abrupta =

Scientific classification
- Kingdom: Animalia
- Phylum: Arthropoda
- Clade: Pancrustacea
- Class: Insecta
- Order: Lepidoptera
- Family: Crambidae
- Subfamily: Crambinae
- Tribe: Calamotrophini
- Genus: Calamotropha
- Species: C. abrupta

Binomial name
- Calamotropha abrupta W.-C. Li & H.-H. Li, 2012

Species of moth

Calamotropha abrupta is a moth in the family Crambidae. It was described by Wei-Chun Li and Hou-Hun Li in 2012. It is found in Yunnan, China.
