= Panotima copidosema =

Scientific classification
- Domain: Eukaryota
- Kingdom: Animalia
- Phylum: Arthropoda
- Class: Insecta
- Order: Lepidoptera
- Family: Crambidae
- Genus: Panotima
- Species: P. copidosema

Binomial name
- Panotima copidosema Meyrick, 1934

Species of moth

Panotima copidosema is a moth in the family Crambidae. It was described by Edward Meyrick in 1934. It is found in the Democratic Republic of the Congo.
