= Calamotropha boninellus =

Scientific classification
- Kingdom: Animalia
- Phylum: Arthropoda
- Clade: Pancrustacea
- Class: Insecta
- Order: Lepidoptera
- Family: Crambidae
- Subfamily: Crambinae
- Tribe: Calamotrophini
- Genus: Calamotropha
- Species: C. boninellus

Binomial name
- Calamotropha boninellus (Shibuya, 1929)

Synonyms
- Crambus boninellus Shibuya, 1929

Species of moth

Calamotropha boninellus is a moth in the family Crambidae. It was described by Jinshichi Shibuya in 1929. It is found in Japan, where it is found on the Bonin Islands.
