= Calamotropha punctivenellus =

Scientific classification
- Kingdom: Animalia
- Phylum: Arthropoda
- Clade: Pancrustacea
- Class: Insecta
- Order: Lepidoptera
- Family: Crambidae
- Subfamily: Crambinae
- Tribe: Calamotrophini
- Genus: Calamotropha
- Species: C. punctivenellus

Binomial name
- Calamotropha punctivenellus (Hampson, 1896)

Synonyms
- Crambus punctivenellus Hampson, 1896

Species of moth

Calamotropha punctivenellus is a moth in the family Crambidae. It was described by George Hampson in 1896. It is found in Sri Lanka.

== Description ==
Its wingspan is 20 mm and it is a white colored moth. Palpi fulvous at sides. Thorax and abdomen irrorated (sprinkled) with brown. Forewings with interspaces suffused with brown scales, leaving the base of the cell and the costal area white. A black spot found at the origin of vein 2. An oblique medial brown striga from costa. A marginal black line somewhat maculate (spotted) at the veins. Hindwings white.
