= Panotima luculenta =

Scientific classification
- Domain: Eukaryota
- Kingdom: Animalia
- Phylum: Arthropoda
- Class: Insecta
- Order: Lepidoptera
- Family: Crambidae
- Genus: Panotima
- Species: P. luculenta

Binomial name
- Panotima luculenta Ghesquière, 1942

Species of moth

Panotima luculenta is a moth in the family Crambidae. It was described by Jean Ghesquière in 1942. It is found in the Democratic Republic of the Congo.
