= Crambus viettellus =

Scientific classification
- Kingdom: Animalia
- Phylum: Arthropoda
- Clade: Pancrustacea
- Class: Insecta
- Order: Lepidoptera
- Family: Crambidae
- Genus: Crambus
- Species: C. viettellus

Binomial name
- Crambus viettellus Błeszyński & Collins, 1962

Species of moth

Crambus viettellus is a moth in the family Crambidae. It was described by Stanisław Błeszyński and R.J. Collins in 1962. It is found in the French Southern Territories, where it has been recorded from Île Amsterdam in the Indian Ocean.
