= Calamotropha afra =

Scientific classification
- Kingdom: Animalia
- Phylum: Arthropoda
- Clade: Pancrustacea
- Class: Insecta
- Order: Lepidoptera
- Family: Crambidae
- Subfamily: Crambinae
- Tribe: Calamotrophini
- Genus: Calamotropha
- Species: C. afra

Binomial name
- Calamotropha afra Bassi, 1986

Species of moth

Calamotropha afra is a moth in the family Crambidae. It was described by Graziano Bassi in 1986. It is found in Zambia.
