= Calamotropha caesella =

Scientific classification
- Kingdom: Animalia
- Phylum: Arthropoda
- Clade: Pancrustacea
- Class: Insecta
- Order: Lepidoptera
- Family: Crambidae
- Subfamily: Crambinae
- Tribe: Calamotrophini
- Genus: Calamotropha
- Species: C. caesella

Binomial name
- Calamotropha caesella (Walker, 1863)

Synonyms
- Araxes caesella Walker, 1863; Araxes famulella Walker, 1866

Species of moth

Calamotropha caesella is a moth in the family Crambidae. It was described by Francis Walker in 1863. It is found in Sri Lanka.
