= Calamotropha obliterans =

Scientific classification
- Kingdom: Animalia
- Phylum: Arthropoda
- Clade: Pancrustacea
- Class: Insecta
- Order: Lepidoptera
- Family: Crambidae
- Subfamily: Crambinae
- Tribe: Calamotrophini
- Genus: Calamotropha
- Species: C. obliterans

Binomial name
- Calamotropha obliterans (Walker, 1863)

Synonyms
- Crambus obliterans Walker, 1863; Crambus obliteranus Hua, 2005; Crambus candidifer Walker, 1863; Crambus candifer Hampson, 1896; Calamotropha condidifer Błeszyński & Collins, 1962

Species of moth

Calamotropha obliterans is a moth in the family Crambidae. It was described by Francis Walker in 1863. It is found on Borneo.
