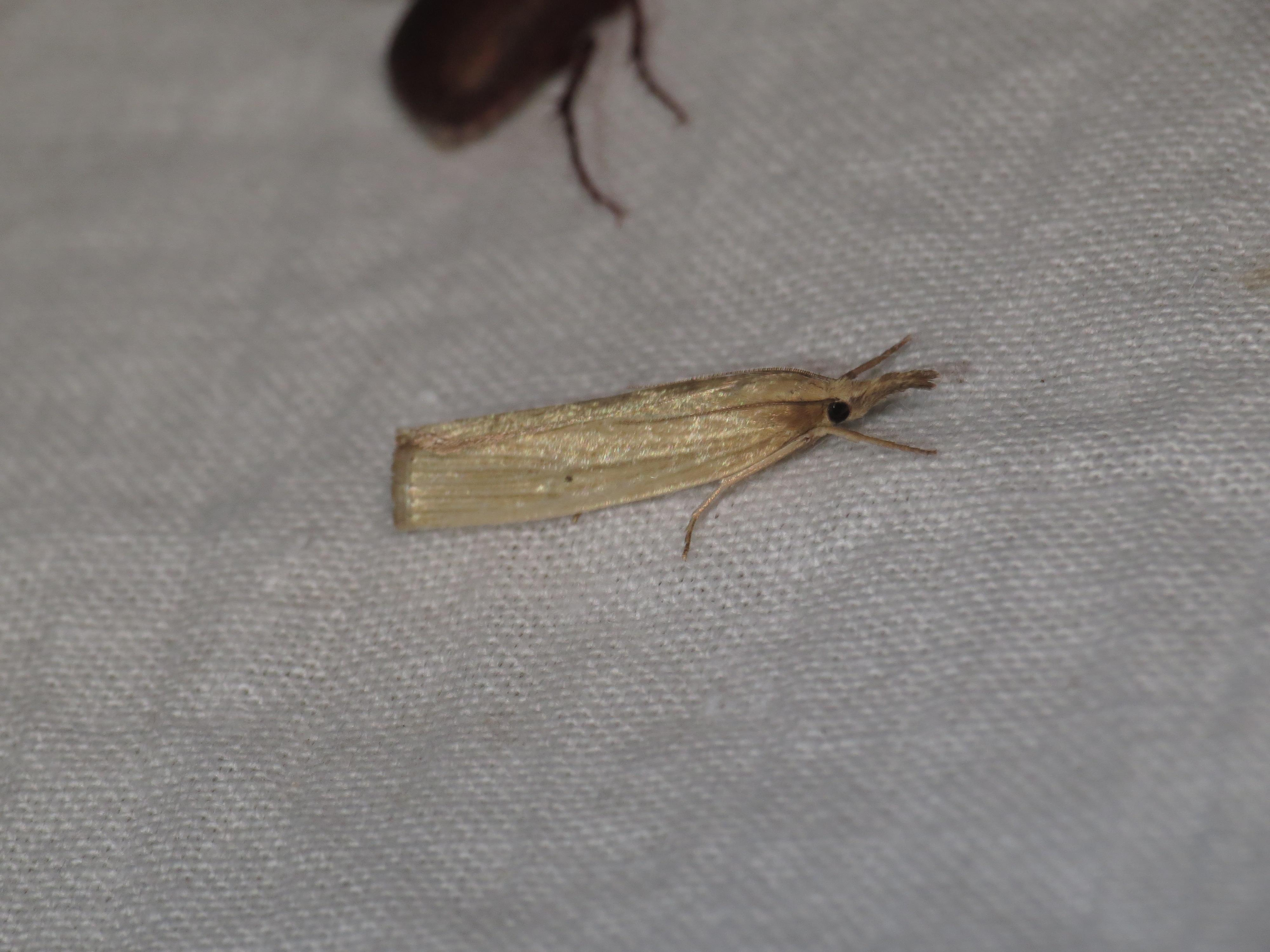

Scientific classification
- Kingdom: Animalia
- Phylum: Arthropoda
- Clade: Pancrustacea
- Class: Insecta
- Order: Lepidoptera
- Family: Crambidae
- Subfamily: Crambinae
- Tribe: Calamotrophini
- Genus: Calamotropha
- Species: C. leptogrammellus

Binomial name
- Calamotropha leptogrammellus (Meyrick, 1879)

Synonyms
- Chilo leptogrammellus Meyrick, 1879; Emmalocera crossospila Turner, 1947

= Calamotropha leptogrammellus =

Species of moth

Calamotropha leptogrammellus, the grass webworm, is a moth in the family Crambidae. It was described by Edward Meyrick in 1879. It is found in Australia, where it has been recorded from Western Australia, the Northern Territory, Queensland, New South Wales and Victoria.
