= Calamotropha bradleyi =

Scientific classification
- Kingdom: Animalia
- Phylum: Arthropoda
- Clade: Pancrustacea
- Class: Insecta
- Order: Lepidoptera
- Family: Crambidae
- Subfamily: Crambinae
- Tribe: Calamotrophini
- Genus: Calamotropha
- Species: C. bradleyi

Binomial name
- Calamotropha bradleyi Błeszyński, 1960

Species of moth

Calamotropha bradleyi is a moth in the family Crambidae. It was described by Stanisław Błeszyński in 1960. It is found in South Africa.
