= Calamotropha franki =

Scientific classification
- Kingdom: Animalia
- Phylum: Arthropoda
- Clade: Pancrustacea
- Class: Insecta
- Order: Lepidoptera
- Family: Crambidae
- Subfamily: Crambinae
- Tribe: Calamotrophini
- Genus: Calamotropha
- Species: C. franki

Binomial name
- Calamotropha franki (Caradja, 1931)

Synonyms
- Crambus franki Caradja, 1931

Species of moth

Calamotropha franki is a moth in the family Crambidae. It was described by Aristide Caradja in 1931. It is found in China.
