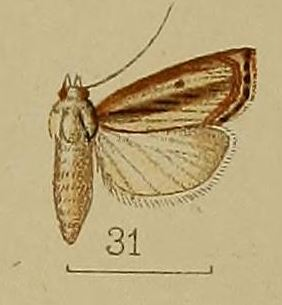

Scientific classification
- Kingdom: Animalia
- Phylum: Arthropoda
- Clade: Pancrustacea
- Class: Insecta
- Order: Lepidoptera
- Family: Crambidae
- Subfamily: Crambinae
- Tribe: Calamotrophini
- Genus: Calamotropha
- Species: C. neurigrammalis

Binomial name
- Calamotropha neurigrammalis (Hampson, 1912)

Synonyms
- Crambus neurigrammalis Hampson, 1912

= Calamotropha neurigrammalis =

Species of moth

Calamotropha neurigrammalis is a moth in the family Crambidae. It was described by George Hampson in 1912. It is found in Sri Lanka.
