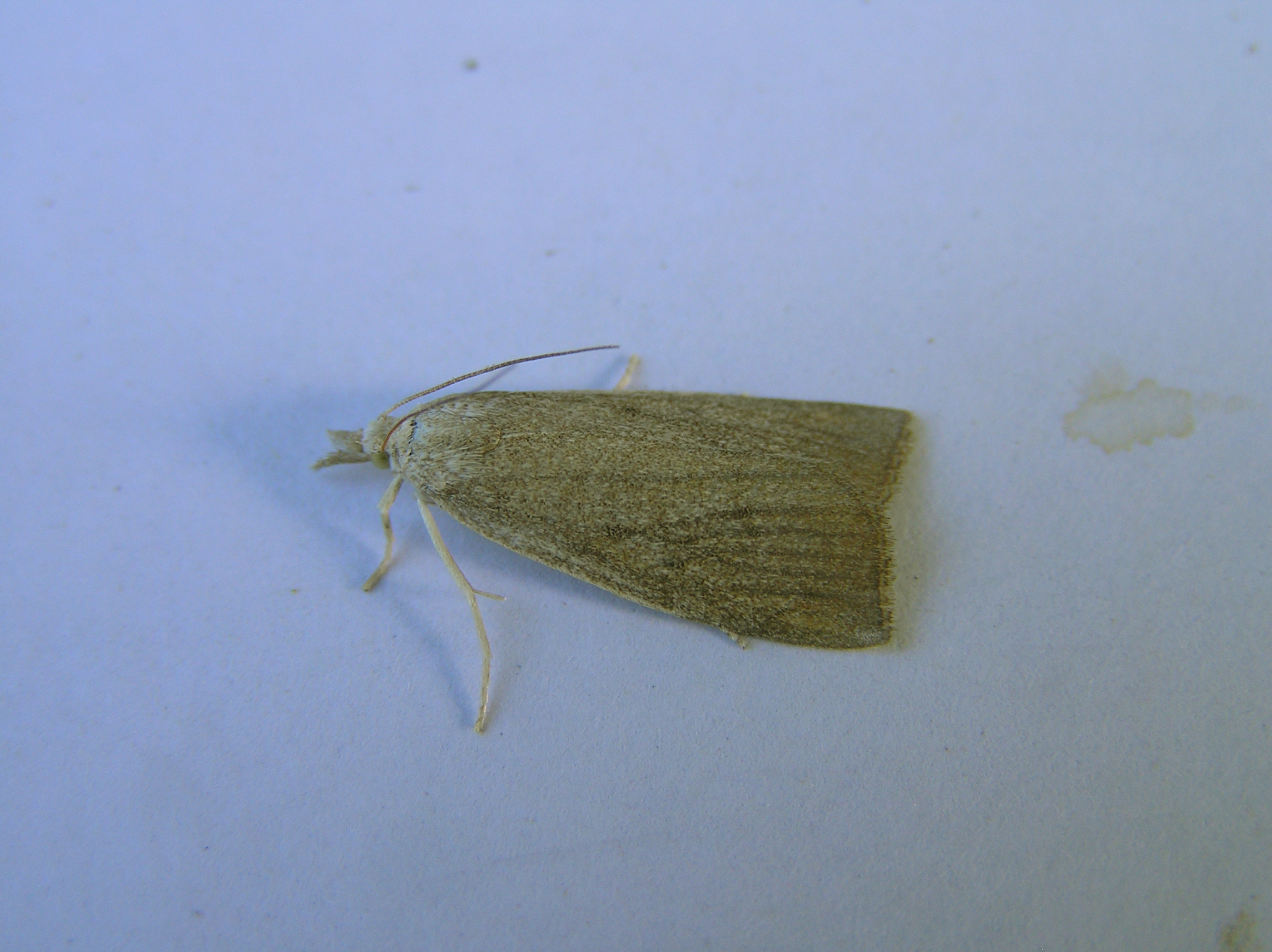
- Calamotropha paludella

Scientific classification
- Kingdom: Animalia
- Phylum: Arthropoda
- Clade: Pancrustacea
- Class: Insecta
- Order: Lepidoptera
- Family: Crambidae
- Subfamily: Crambinae
- Tribe: Calamotrophini
- Genus: Calamotropha; Zeller, 1863

Synonyms
- Aurelianus Błeszyński, 1962; Myeza Walker, 1863

= Calamotropha =

Genus of moths

Calamotropha is a genus of moths of the family Crambidae.

== Species ==
- Calamotropha abjectella Snellen, 1872
- Calamotropha abrupta W. Li & H. Li, 2012
- Calamotropha aeneiciliellus (de Joannis, 1930)
- Calamotropha aequilata W. Li & H. Li, 2012
- Calamotropha afra Bassi, 1986
- Calamotropha agryppina Błeszyński, 1961
- Calamotropha albistrigellus (Hampson, 1896)
- Calamotropha alcesta Błeszyński, 1961
- Calamotropha anticella (Walker, 1866) (from Sri Lanka)
- Calamotropha arachnophagus (Strand, 1918)
- Calamotropha argenteociliella Pagenstecher, 1893
- Calamotropha argenticilia (Hampson, 1896) (from Sri Lanka)
- Calamotropha argyrostola (Hampson, 1919)
- Calamotropha athena Błeszyński, 1961
- Calamotropha atkinsoni Zeller, 1863 (from Sri Lanka)
- Calamotropha aureliellus (Fischer von Röslerstamm, 1841)
- Calamotropha azumai Błeszyński, 1960
- Calamotropha baibarellus (Shibuya, 1928)
- Calamotropha bicepellum Song in Song, Wang & Wu, 2002
- Calamotropha bicornutella Błeszyński, 1961
- Calamotropha boninellus (Shibuya, 1929)
- Calamotropha bradleyi Błeszyński, 1960
- Calamotropha brevilinellus (South in Leech & South, 1901)
- Calamotropha brevistrigellus (Caradja, 1932)
- Calamotropha caesella (Walker, 1863)
- Calamotropha camilla Błeszyński, 1966
- Calamotropha cleopatra Błeszyński, 1961
- Calamotropha corticellus (Hampson, 1899)
- Calamotropha dagamae Bassi in Bassi & Trematerra, 2014
- Calamotropha danutae Błeszyński, 1961
- Calamotropha delatalis (Walker, 1863)
- Calamotropha dentatella Song & Chen in Chen, Song & Yuan, 2002
- Calamotropha diakonoffi Błeszyński, 1961
- Calamotropha dielota Meyrick, 1886
- Calamotropha diodonta (Hampson, 1919)
- Calamotropha discellus (Walker, 1863)
- Calamotropha doii Sasaki, 1997
- Calamotropha duofurcata W. Li & H. Li, 2012
- Calamotropha endopolia Hampson, 1912
- Calamotropha euphrosyne Błeszyński, 1966
- Calamotropha formosella Błeszyński, 1961
- Calamotropha franki (Caradja, 1931)
- Calamotropha fulvifusalis (Hampson, 1900)
- Calamotropha fuscacostalis Maes, 2012
- Calamotropha fuscilineatellus (D. Lucas, 1938)
- Calamotropha fuscivittalis (Hampson, 1910)
- Calamotropha haplorus (Turner, 1911)
- Calamotropha heliocaustus (Wallengren, 1876)
- Calamotropha hierichuntica Zeller, 1867
- Calamotropha indica Błeszyński, 1961
- Calamotropha janusella Błeszyński, 1961
- Calamotropha javaica Błeszyński, 1961
- Calamotropha josettae Błeszyński, 1961
- Calamotropha joskeaella Błeszyński, 1961
- Calamotropha kuchleini Błeszyński, 1961
- Calamotropha kurenzovi Kirpichnikova, 1982
- Calamotropha latellus (Snellen, 1890)
- Calamotropha lattini Błeszyński, 1961
- Calamotropha lempkei Schouten, 1993
- Calamotropha leptogrammellus (Meyrick, 1879)
- Calamotropha lupatus (Meyrick, 1932)
- Calamotropha malgasella Błeszyński, 1970
- Calamotropha martini Błeszyński, 1961
- Calamotropha megalopunctata Błeszyński, 1961
- Calamotropha melanosticta (Hampson, 1896)
- Calamotropha melli (Caradja & Meyrick, 1933)
- Calamotropha mesostrigalis (Hampson, 1919)
- Calamotropha mimosa Błeszyński, 1961
- Calamotropha multicornuella Song & Chen in Chen, Song & Yuan, 2002
- Calamotropha neurigrammalis (Hampson, 1912)
- Calamotropha nigripunctellus (Leech, 1889)
- Calamotropha niveicostellus (Hampson, 1919)
- Calamotropha obliterans (Walker, 1863)
- Calamotropha oculalis (Snellen, 1893)
- Calamotropha okanoi Błeszyński, 1961
- Calamotropha paludella (Hübner, 1824)
- Calamotropha papuella Błeszyński, 1966
- Calamotropha psaltrias (Meyrick, 1933)
- Calamotropha pseudodielota Błeszyński, 1961
- Calamotropha punctivenellus (Hampson, 1896)
- Calamotropha robustella Snellen, 1872
- Calamotropha saturnella Błeszyński, 1961
- Calamotropha sawtoothella Song & Chen in Chen, Song & Yuan, 2002
- Calamotropha schoennmanni Błeszyński, 1961
- Calamotropha schwarzi Błeszyński, 1961
- Calamotropha shichito (Marumo, 1931)
- Calamotropha sienkiewiczi Błeszyński, 1961
- Calamotropha snelleni Schouten, 1993
- Calamotropha stachi Błeszyński, 1961
- Calamotropha subalcesta Błeszyński, 1961
- Calamotropha subdiodonta Błeszyński, 1961
- Calamotropha subterminellus (Wileman & South, 1917)
- Calamotropha sumatraella Błeszyński, 1961
- Calamotropha sybilla Błeszyński, 1966
- Calamotropha tonsalis (Walker, 1863)
- Calamotropha toonderi Schouten, 1993
- Calamotropha torpidellus (Zeller, 1852)
- Calamotropha toxophorus (de Joannis, 1927)
- Calamotropha tripartitus (Hampson, 1919)
- Calamotropha unicolorellus (Zeller, 1863)
- Calamotropha unispinea W. Li & H. Li, 2012
- Calamotropha venera Błeszyński, 1961
- Calamotropha virginiae Bassi in Bassi & Trematerra, 2014
- Calamotropha virra Błeszyński, 1966
- Calamotropha wallengreni Błeszyński, 1961
- Calamotropha xantholeuca (Meyrick, 1933)
- Calamotropha xanthypa Błeszyński, 1961
- Calamotropha yamanakai Inoue, 1958
- Calamotropha zoma Viette, 1971
