= Calamotropha melli =

Scientific classification
- Kingdom: Animalia
- Phylum: Arthropoda
- Clade: Pancrustacea
- Class: Insecta
- Order: Lepidoptera
- Family: Crambidae
- Subfamily: Crambinae
- Tribe: Calamotrophini
- Genus: Calamotropha
- Species: C. melli

Binomial name
- Calamotropha melli (Caradja & Meyrick, 1933)

Synonyms
- Crambus melli Caradja & Meyrick, 1933

Species of moth

Calamotropha melli is a moth in the family Crambidae. It was described by Aristide Caradja and Edward Meyrick in 1933. It is found in China in what was called Guandong, now in Northeast China.
