= Calamotropha aureliellus =

Scientific classification
- Kingdom: Animalia
- Phylum: Arthropoda
- Clade: Pancrustacea
- Class: Insecta
- Order: Lepidoptera
- Family: Crambidae
- Subfamily: Crambinae
- Tribe: Calamotrophini
- Genus: Calamotropha
- Species: C. aureliellus

Binomial name
- Calamotropha aureliellus (Fischer v. Röslerstamm, 1841)

Synonyms
- Chilo aureliellus Fischer v. Röslerstamm, 1841; Chilo aurescellus Fischer von Röslerstamm, 1834; Calamotropha fulvilineata Okano, 1958; Crambus aureliellus ab. approximellus Preissecker, 1937; Crambus aureliellus ab. fischeri Osthelder, 1937; Calamotropha aureliellus kikuchii Okano, 1960; Crambus aureliellus korbi Bleszynski, 1965

Species of moth

Calamotropha aureliellus is a species of moth in the family Crambidae. It is found in France, Switzerland, Austria, Italy, Germany, Poland, the Czech Republic, Slovakia, Hungary, Romania, Bulgaria, the Republic of Macedonia, Greece, the Russian Far East and Japan.

The wingspan is about 23 mm.

== Subspecies ==
- Calamotropha aureliellus aureliella (Europe, Russian Far East, Japan)
- Calamotropha aureliellus korbi (Caradja, 1910) (Amur)
- Calamotropha aureliellus kikuchii Okano, 1960 (Japan: northern Honshu)
