= Marwitzia =

Scientific classification
- Kingdom: Animalia
- Phylum: Arthropoda
- Class: Insecta
- Order: Lepidoptera
- Family: Crambidae
- Subfamily: Spilomelinae
- Tribe: Margaroniini
- Genus: Marwitzia; Gaede, 1917

Genus of moths

Marwitzia is a genus of moths of the family Crambidae.

== Species ==
- Marwitzia centiguttalis Gaede, 1917
- Marwitzia costinigralis Maes, 1998
- Marwitzia dichocrocis (Hampson, 1913)

== Former species ==
- Marwitzia polystidzalis (Hampson, 1918)
