= Calamotropha unicolorellus =

Scientific classification
- Kingdom: Animalia
- Phylum: Arthropoda
- Clade: Pancrustacea
- Class: Insecta
- Order: Lepidoptera
- Family: Crambidae
- Subfamily: Crambinae
- Tribe: Calamotrophini
- Genus: Calamotropha
- Species: C. unicolorellus

Binomial name
- Calamotropha unicolorellus (Zeller, 1863)

Synonyms
- Chilo unicolorellus Zeller, 1863

Species of moth

Calamotropha unicolorellus is a moth in the family Crambidae. It was described by Zeller in 1863. It is found in the Himalayas.
