= Calamotropha kurenzovi =

Scientific classification
- Kingdom: Animalia
- Phylum: Arthropoda
- Clade: Pancrustacea
- Class: Insecta
- Order: Lepidoptera
- Family: Crambidae
- Subfamily: Crambinae
- Tribe: Calamotrophini
- Genus: Calamotropha
- Species: C. kurenzovi

Binomial name
- Calamotropha kurenzovi Kirpichnikova, 1982

Synonyms
- Calamotropha kurentzovi Sinev, 2008

Species of moth

Calamotropha kurenzovi is a moth in the family Crambidae. It was described by Valentina A. Kirpichnikova in 1982. It is found in Primorsky Krai in the Russian Far East.
