= Calamotropha aeneiciliellus =

Scientific classification
- Kingdom: Animalia
- Phylum: Arthropoda
- Clade: Pancrustacea
- Class: Insecta
- Order: Lepidoptera
- Family: Crambidae
- Subfamily: Crambinae
- Tribe: Calamotrophini
- Genus: Calamotropha
- Species: C. aeneiciliellus

Binomial name
- Calamotropha aeneiciliellus (de Joannis, 1930)

Synonyms
- Crambus aeneiciliellus de Joannis, 1930

Species of moth

Calamotropha aeneiciliellus is a moth in the family Crambidae. It was described by Joseph de Joannis in 1930. It is found in Vietnam.
