= Calamotropha baibarellus =

Scientific classification
- Kingdom: Animalia
- Phylum: Arthropoda
- Clade: Pancrustacea
- Class: Insecta
- Order: Lepidoptera
- Family: Crambidae
- Subfamily: Crambinae
- Tribe: Calamotrophini
- Genus: Calamotropha
- Species: C. baibarellus

Binomial name
- Calamotropha baibarellus (Shibuya, 1928)

Synonyms
- Crambus baibarellus Shibuya, 1928; Calamotropha sattleri Bleszynski, 1961

Species of moth

Calamotropha baibarellus is a moth in the family Crambidae. It was described by Jinshichi Shibuya in 1928. It is found in Taiwan.
