= Culladiella generosus =

Scientific classification
- Kingdom: Animalia
- Phylum: Arthropoda
- Clade: Pancrustacea
- Class: Insecta
- Order: Lepidoptera
- Family: Crambidae
- Genus: Culladiella
- Species: C. generosus

Binomial name
- Culladiella generosus (Meyrick, 1936)

Synonyms
- Crambus generosus Meyrick, 1936

Species of insect

Culladiella generosus is a moth in the family Crambidae. It was described by Edward Meyrick in 1936. It is found in the Democratic Republic of the Congo.
