= Calamotropha virginiae =

Scientific classification
- Kingdom: Animalia
- Phylum: Arthropoda
- Clade: Pancrustacea
- Class: Insecta
- Order: Lepidoptera
- Family: Crambidae
- Subfamily: Crambinae
- Tribe: Calamotrophini
- Genus: Calamotropha
- Species: C. virginiae

Binomial name
- Calamotropha virginiae Bassi in Bassi & Trematerra, 2014

Species of moth

Calamotropha virginiae is a moth in the family Crambidae. It was described by Graziano Bassi in 2014. It is found in Mozambique.
