= Calamotropha melanosticta =

Scientific classification
- Kingdom: Animalia
- Phylum: Arthropoda
- Clade: Pancrustacea
- Class: Insecta
- Order: Lepidoptera
- Family: Crambidae
- Subfamily: Crambinae
- Tribe: Calamotrophini
- Genus: Calamotropha
- Species: C. melanosticta

Binomial name
- Calamotropha melanosticta (Hampson, 1896)

Synonyms
- Crambus melanosticta Hampson, 1896

Species of moth

Calamotropha melanosticta is a moth in the family Crambidae. It was described by George Hampson in 1896. It is found in Sri Lanka.

== Description ==
Its wingspan is 16–20 mm. The palpi are white at their tips. The forewings have two oblique medial-costal brown striga continued as a single medial line angled below costa, with a black spot on it at vein 2. The submarginal line brown, further from margin, double from the costa to its angle at vein 6 and incurved at vein 2. A slight brown marginal line present along with silvery cilia.
