= Calamotropha atkinsoni =

Scientific classification
- Kingdom: Animalia
- Phylum: Arthropoda
- Clade: Pancrustacea
- Class: Insecta
- Order: Lepidoptera
- Family: Crambidae
- Subfamily: Crambinae
- Tribe: Calamotrophini
- Genus: Calamotropha
- Species: C. atkinsoni

Binomial name
- Calamotropha atkinsoni Zeller, 1863

Synonyms
- Calamotropha fuscicostella Snellen, 1880; Crambus holodryas Meyrick, 1933

Species of moth

Calamotropha atkinsoni is a moth in the family Crambidae. It was described by Philipp Christoph Zeller in 1863. It is found in south-east Asia, where it has been recorded from India, Sri Lanka, Thailand, Singapore and Sulawesi.

== Description ==
The wingspan is 28 mm in the male and 28–34 mm in the female. Forewings with vein 11 curved and approximated to vein 12. Hindwings with veins 4 and 5 from angle of cell. Forewings with rectangular apex. In male, head and thorax brownish grey. Forewings with costal and inner area grey irrorated (sprinkled) with fuscous, leaving a golden-brown and fuscous streak along median nervure, expanding in the interspaces between veins 3 and 5. A black discocellular spot and traces of a curved submarginal dark specks series present. A marginal black specks series is present. Hindwings nearly pure white. Abdomen and ventral side whitish. Female with head, thorax and forewings much more uniformly coppery-golden brown, irrorated with white scales. The costal area of forewings darker reddish brown. The discocellular spot more prominent. No traces of submarginal dark specks. Hindwings pure white as in male.

== Subspecies ==
- Calamotropha atkinsoni atkinsoni
- Calamotropha atkinsoni malaica Błeszyński, 1961 (Singapore)
