= Calamotropha zoma =

Scientific classification
- Kingdom: Animalia
- Phylum: Arthropoda
- Clade: Pancrustacea
- Class: Insecta
- Order: Lepidoptera
- Family: Crambidae
- Subfamily: Crambinae
- Tribe: Calamotrophini
- Genus: Calamotropha
- Species: C. zoma

Binomial name
- Calamotropha zoma Viette, 1971

Species of moth

Calamotropha zoma is a moth in the family Crambidae. It was described by Viette in 1971. It is found in Madagascar.
