= Calamotropha corticellus =

Scientific classification
- Kingdom: Animalia
- Phylum: Arthropoda
- Clade: Pancrustacea
- Class: Insecta
- Order: Lepidoptera
- Family: Crambidae
- Subfamily: Crambinae
- Tribe: Calamotrophini
- Genus: Calamotropha
- Species: C. corticellus

Binomial name
- Calamotropha corticellus (Hampson, 1899)

Synonyms
- Crambus corticellus Hampson, 1899

Species of moth

Calamotropha corticellus is a moth in the family Crambidae. It was described by George Hampson in 1899. It is found in India.
