= Calamotropha subterminellus =

Scientific classification
- Kingdom: Animalia
- Phylum: Arthropoda
- Clade: Pancrustacea
- Class: Insecta
- Order: Lepidoptera
- Family: Crambidae
- Subfamily: Crambinae
- Tribe: Calamotrophini
- Genus: Calamotropha
- Species: C. subterminellus

Binomial name
- Calamotropha subterminellus (Wileman & South, 1917)

Synonyms
- Crambus subterminellus Wileman & South, 1917

Species of moth

Calamotropha subterminellus is a moth in the family Crambidae. It was described by Wileman and South in 1917. It is found in Taiwan.
