= Calamotropha fuscacostalis =

Scientific classification
- Kingdom: Animalia
- Phylum: Arthropoda
- Clade: Pancrustacea
- Class: Insecta
- Order: Lepidoptera
- Family: Crambidae
- Subfamily: Crambinae
- Tribe: Calamotrophini
- Genus: Calamotropha
- Species: C. fuscacostalis

Binomial name
- Calamotropha fuscacostalis Maes, 2012

Species of moth

Calamotropha fuscacostalis is a moth in the family Crambidae. It was described by Koen V. N. Maes in 2012. It is found in Cameroon.
