= Calamotropha delatalis =

Scientific classification
- Kingdom: Animalia
- Phylum: Arthropoda
- Clade: Pancrustacea
- Class: Insecta
- Order: Lepidoptera
- Family: Crambidae
- Subfamily: Crambinae
- Tribe: Calamotrophini
- Genus: Calamotropha
- Species: C. delatalis

Binomial name
- Calamotropha delatalis (Walker, 1863)

Synonyms
- Crambus delatalis Walker, 1863

Species of moth

Calamotropha delatalis, is a moth in the family Crambidae. It was described by Francis Walker in 1863. It is found in Sri Lanka and Australia, where it has been recorded from Queensland, New South Wales and Victoria.

== Description ==
The wingspan is about 27 mm in the male and 30 mm in the female. It is a pale greyish-brown moth. The vertex of the head is whitish. Forewings with veins and interspaces finely streaked with brown. A black discocellular speck and a marginal brown specks series present. Hindwings fuscous brown.

The larvae probably bore into the stems of grass species.
