= Lirabotys prolausalis =

Scientific classification
- Kingdom: Animalia
- Phylum: Arthropoda
- Class: Insecta
- Order: Lepidoptera
- Family: Crambidae
- Genus: Lirabotys
- Species: L. prolausalis

Binomial name
- Lirabotys prolausalis (Walker, 1859)

Synonyms
- Botys prolausalis Walker, 1859; Botys longalis Walker, 1866

Species of moth

Lirabotys prolausalis is a moth in the family Crambidae. It was described by Francis Walker in 1859. It is found in Mozambique and South Africa.
