= Calamotropha bicepellum =

Scientific classification
- Kingdom: Animalia
- Phylum: Arthropoda
- Clade: Pancrustacea
- Class: Insecta
- Order: Lepidoptera
- Family: Crambidae
- Subfamily: Crambinae
- Tribe: Calamotrophini
- Genus: Calamotropha
- Species: C. bicepellum

Binomial name
- Calamotropha bicepellum Song in Song, Wang & Wu, 2002

Species of moth

Calamotropha bicepellum is a moth in the family Crambidae. It was described by Shi-Mei Song in 2002. It is found in Guangdong, China.
