= Calamotropha nigripunctellus =

Scientific classification
- Kingdom: Animalia
- Phylum: Arthropoda
- Clade: Pancrustacea
- Class: Insecta
- Order: Lepidoptera
- Family: Crambidae
- Subfamily: Crambinae
- Tribe: Calamotrophini
- Genus: Calamotropha
- Species: C. nigripunctellus

Binomial name
- Calamotropha nigripunctellus (Leech, 1889)

Synonyms
- Crambus nigripunctellus Leech, 1889; Crambus hoenei Caradja & Meyrick, 1935

Species of moth

Calamotropha nigripunctellus is a moth in the family Crambidae. It was described by John Henry Leech in 1889. It is found in Zhejiang, China.
