= Calamotropha dentatella =

Scientific classification
- Kingdom: Animalia
- Phylum: Arthropoda
- Clade: Pancrustacea
- Class: Insecta
- Order: Lepidoptera
- Family: Crambidae
- Subfamily: Crambinae
- Tribe: Calamotrophini
- Genus: Calamotropha
- Species: C. dentatella

Binomial name
- Calamotropha dentatella Song & Chen in Chen, Song & Yuan, 2002

Species of moth

Calamotropha dentatella is a moth in the family Crambidae. It was described by Shi-Mei Song and Tie-Mei Chen in 2002. It is found in Guangxi, China.
