= Calamotropha argenticilia =

Scientific classification
- Kingdom: Animalia
- Phylum: Arthropoda
- Clade: Pancrustacea
- Class: Insecta
- Order: Lepidoptera
- Family: Crambidae
- Subfamily: Crambinae
- Tribe: Calamotrophini
- Genus: Calamotropha
- Species: C. argenticilia

Binomial name
- Calamotropha argenticilia (Hampson, 1896)

Synonyms
- Crambus argenticilia Hampson, 1896

Species of moth

Calamotropha argenticilia is a moth in the family Crambidae. It was described by George Hampson in 1896. It is found in Sri Lanka, India and Bhutan.

== Description ==
The wingspan is 16 mm. Male pure silvery white. Palpi tinged with fulvous at base. Forewings with fine pale fuscous, slightly sinuous erect medial line. A similar submarginal line slightly excurved between veins 6 and 3. A black marginal line present with silvery cilia.
