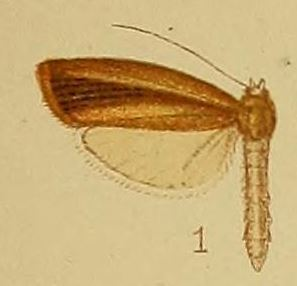

Scientific classification
- Kingdom: Animalia
- Phylum: Arthropoda
- Clade: Pancrustacea
- Class: Insecta
- Order: Lepidoptera
- Family: Crambidae
- Subfamily: Crambinae
- Tribe: Calamotrophini
- Genus: Calamotropha
- Species: C. fuscivittalis

Binomial name
- Calamotropha fuscivittalis (Hampson, 1910)

Synonyms
- Crambus fuscivittalis Hampson, 1910

= Calamotropha fuscivittalis =

Species of moth

Calamotropha fuscivittalis is a moth in the family Crambidae. It was described by George Hampson in 1910. It is found in Zambia.
