= Culladiella acacia =

Scientific classification
- Kingdom: Animalia
- Phylum: Arthropoda
- Clade: Pancrustacea
- Class: Insecta
- Order: Lepidoptera
- Family: Crambidae
- Genus: Culladiella
- Species: C. acacia

Binomial name
- Culladiella acacia Schouten, 1993

Species of moth

Culladiella acacia is a moth in the family Crambidae. It was described by Schouten in 1993. It is found in Kenya.
