= Calamotropha mesostrigalis =

Scientific classification
- Kingdom: Animalia
- Phylum: Arthropoda
- Clade: Pancrustacea
- Class: Insecta
- Order: Lepidoptera
- Family: Crambidae
- Subfamily: Crambinae
- Tribe: Calamotrophini
- Genus: Calamotropha
- Species: C. mesostrigalis

Binomial name
- Calamotropha mesostrigalis (Hampson, 1919)

Synonyms
- Chilo mesostrigalis Hampson, 1919

Species of moth

Calamotropha mesostrigalis is a moth in the family Crambidae. It was described by George Hampson in 1919. It is found in Mozambique.
