= Sameodesma =

Scientific classification
- Domain: Eukaryota
- Kingdom: Animalia
- Phylum: Arthropoda
- Class: Insecta
- Order: Lepidoptera
- Family: Crambidae
- Subfamily: Spilomelinae
- Genus: Sameodesma; Hampson, 1918

Genus of moths

Sameodesma is a genus of moths of the family Crambidae described by George Hampson in 1918.

== Species ==
- Sameodesma undilinealis Hampson, 1918
- Sameodesma xanthocraspia (Hampson, 1913)
