= Calamotropha shichito =

Scientific classification
- Kingdom: Animalia
- Phylum: Arthropoda
- Clade: Pancrustacea
- Class: Insecta
- Order: Lepidoptera
- Family: Crambidae
- Subfamily: Crambinae
- Tribe: Calamotrophini
- Genus: Calamotropha
- Species: C. shichito

Binomial name
- Calamotropha shichito (Marumo, 1931)

Synonyms
- Crambus shichito Marumo, 1931; Crambus subfamulellus Caradja & Meyrick, 1937

Species of moth

Calamotropha shichito is a moth in the family Crambidae. It was described by Nobukatsu Marumo in 1931. It is found on Japan's Kyushu island and in China.
