= Calamotropha lempkei =

Scientific classification
- Kingdom: Animalia
- Phylum: Arthropoda
- Clade: Pancrustacea
- Class: Insecta
- Order: Lepidoptera
- Family: Crambidae
- Subfamily: Crambinae
- Tribe: Calamotrophini
- Genus: Calamotropha
- Species: C. lempkei

Binomial name
- Calamotropha lempkei Schouten, 1993

Species of moth

Calamotropha lempkei is a moth in the family Crambidae. It was described by Schouten in 1993. It is found in Ivory Coast.
