= Calamotropha haplorus =

Scientific classification
- Kingdom: Animalia
- Phylum: Arthropoda
- Clade: Pancrustacea
- Class: Insecta
- Order: Lepidoptera
- Family: Crambidae
- Subfamily: Crambinae
- Tribe: Calamotrophini
- Genus: Calamotropha
- Species: C. haplorus

Binomial name
- Calamotropha haplorus (Turner, 1911)

Synonyms
- Crambus haplorus Turner, 1911

Species of moth

Calamotropha haplorus is a moth in the family Crambidae. It was described by Alfred Jefferis Turner in 1911. It is found in Australia, where it has been recorded from the Northern Territory.
