= Marwitzia costinigralis =

Scientific classification
- Kingdom: Animalia
- Phylum: Arthropoda
- Class: Insecta
- Order: Lepidoptera
- Family: Crambidae
- Genus: Marwitzia
- Species: M. costinigralis

Binomial name
- Marwitzia costinigralis Maes, 1998

Synonyms
- Marwitzia nigricostalis Maes, 1998

Species of moth

Marwitzia costinigralis is a moth in the family Crambidae. It was described by Koen V. N. Maes in 1998. It is found in Uganda.
