= Panotima angularis =

Scientific classification
- Kingdom: Animalia
- Phylum: Arthropoda
- Class: Insecta
- Order: Lepidoptera
- Family: Crambidae
- Genus: Panotima
- Species: P. angularis

Binomial name
- Panotima angularis (Hampson, 1897)

Synonyms
- Parthenodes angularis Hampson, 1897

Species of moth

Panotima angularis is a moth in the family Crambidae. It was described by George Hampson in 1897. It is found on Madagascar.
