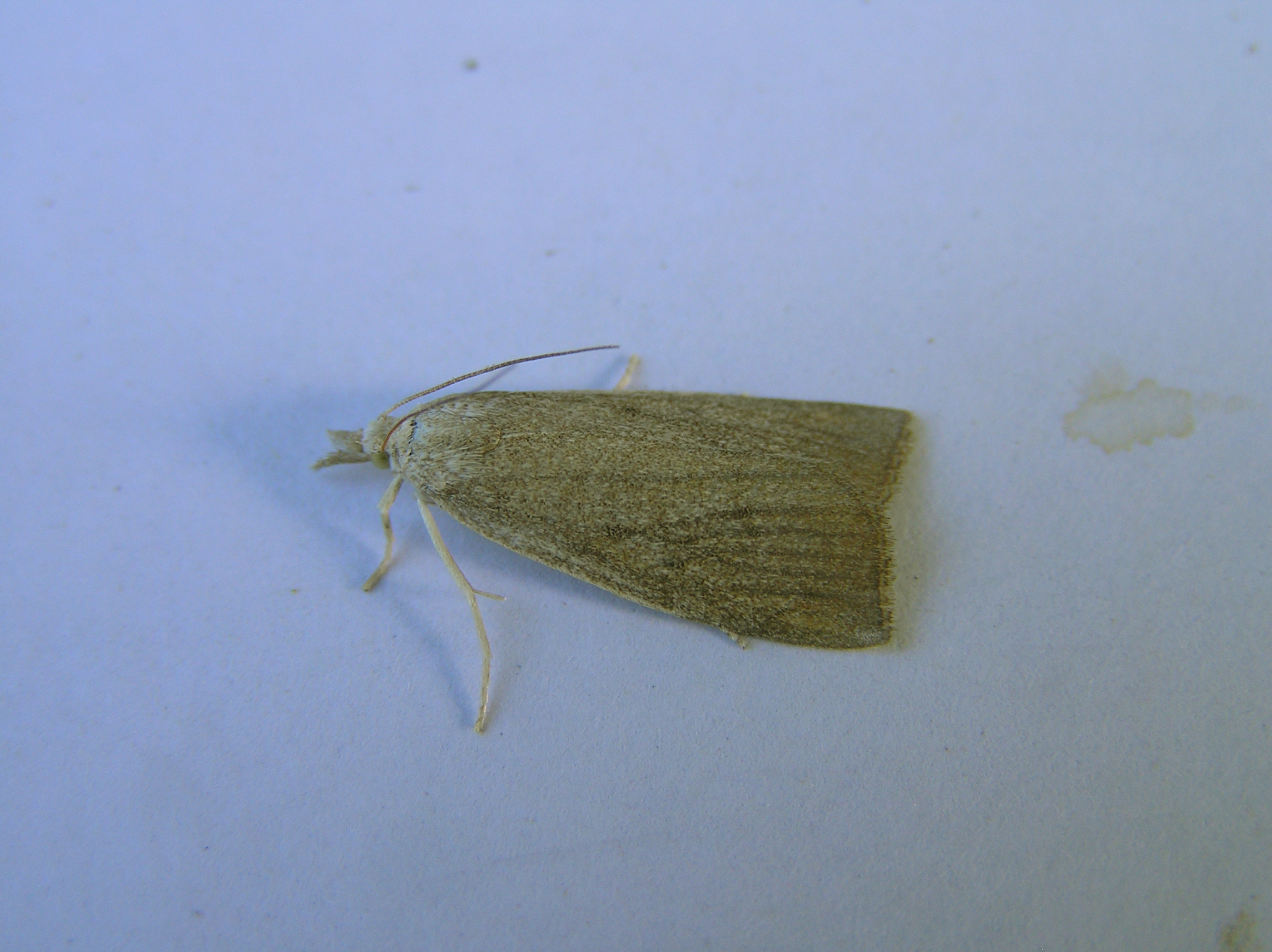

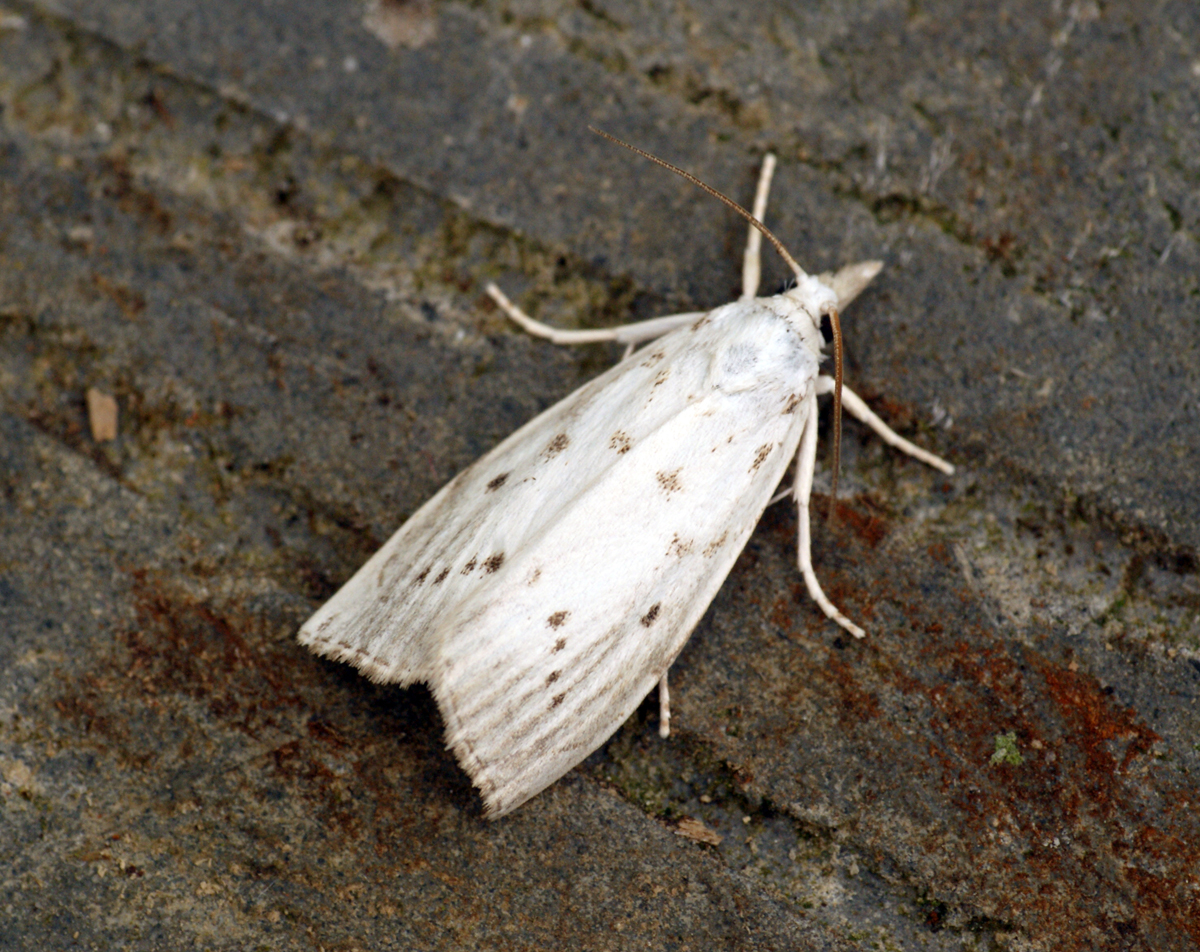

Scientific classification
- Kingdom: Animalia
- Phylum: Arthropoda
- Clade: Pancrustacea
- Class: Insecta
- Order: Lepidoptera
- Family: Crambidae
- Subfamily: Crambinae
- Tribe: Calamotrophini
- Genus: Calamotropha
- Species: C. paludella

Binomial name
- Calamotropha paludella (Hübner, 1824)

Synonyms
- List: Tinea paludella Hübner, 1824; Calamotropha afghanistanica Bleszynski, 1959; Chilo paramattellus Meyrick, 1878; Chilo obtusellus Stainton, 1856; Chilo parramattellus Meyrick, 1879; Conocrambus calamosus Hampson, 1919; Crambus carpherus Hampson, 1898; Crambus digitatus Osthelder, 1937; Crambus durandi; Crambus griseostrigata; Crambus nivellus; Crambus typhivorus Meyrick, 1932; Calamotropha paludella purellus (Leech, 1889); Calamotropha inouei Bleszynski, 1959; Crambus angulatus Shibuya, 1928; Crambus chionostola Hampson, 1919; Crambus flaviguttellus Wileman & South, 1917; Crambus purellus f. aurifusalis Caradja, 1927; Crambus purellus var. aurofusalis (Caradja, 1938)

= Calamotropha paludella =

Species of moth

Calamotropha paludella is a species of moth of the family Crambidae. It is found in Europe, Africa, Australia and large parts of Asia and was recently introduced accidentally to the Eastern United States.

The wingspan is 23–29 mm. The moth flies from June to August depending on the location.

The larvae feed on bulrush (Typha latifolia) and sometimes lesser bulrush (Typha angustifolia).
