= Calamotropha tripartitus =

Scientific classification
- Kingdom: Animalia
- Phylum: Arthropoda
- Clade: Pancrustacea
- Class: Insecta
- Order: Lepidoptera
- Family: Crambidae
- Subfamily: Crambinae
- Tribe: Calamotrophini
- Genus: Calamotropha
- Species: C. tripartitus

Binomial name
- Calamotropha tripartitus (Hampson, 1919)

Synonyms
- Crambus tripartitus Hampson, 1919

Species of moth

Calamotropha tripartitus is a moth in the family Crambidae. It was described by George Hampson in 1919. It is found in South Africa, where it has been recorded from KwaZulu-Natal.
