= Calamotropha heliocaustus =

Scientific classification
- Kingdom: Animalia
- Phylum: Arthropoda
- Clade: Pancrustacea
- Class: Insecta
- Order: Lepidoptera
- Family: Crambidae
- Subfamily: Crambinae
- Tribe: Calamotrophini
- Genus: Calamotropha
- Species: C. heliocaustus

Binomial name
- Calamotropha heliocaustus (Wallengren, 1876)

Synonyms
- Crambus heliocaustus Wallengren, 1876

Species of moth

Calamotropha heliocaustus is a moth in the family Crambidae. It was described by Wallengren in 1876. It is found in South Africa and Zimbabwe.
