= Mecyna procillusalis =

Scientific classification
- Kingdom: Animalia
- Phylum: Arthropoda
- Class: Insecta
- Order: Lepidoptera
- Family: Crambidae
- Genus: Mecyna
- Species: M. procillusalis

Binomial name
- Mecyna procillusalis (Walker, 1859)

Synonyms
- Botys procillusalis Walker, 1859; Pyrausta procillusalis; Botys flavissimalis Walker, 1866; Metasia holoxanthia Hampson, 1899; Metasia holoxantha Maes, 2014

Species of moth

Mecyna procillusalis is a moth in the family Crambidae. It was described by Francis Walker in 1859. It is found in South Africa.
