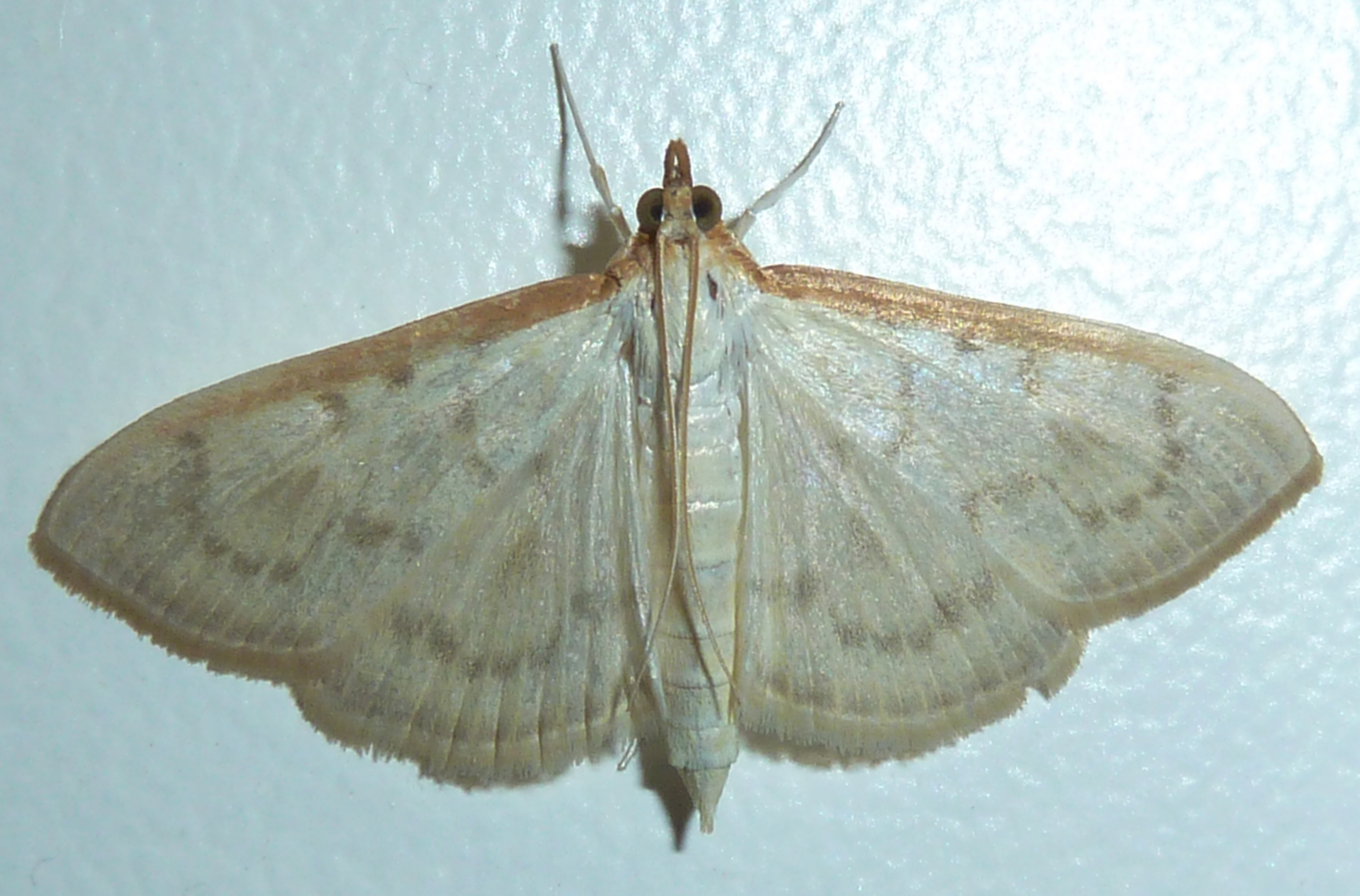

Scientific classification
- Kingdom: Animalia
- Phylum: Arthropoda
- Class: Insecta
- Order: Lepidoptera
- Family: Crambidae
- Tribe: Margaroniini
- Genus: Hodebertia; Leraut, 2003
- Species: H. testalis

Binomial name
- Hodebertia testalis (Fabricius, 1794)

Synonyms
- Phalaena testalis Fabricius, 1794; Pyrausta testalis; Palpita testalis; Botys melonalis Walker, 1859; Botys perpendiculalis Duponchel, 1833; Pleuroptya perpendicularis P. Leraut, 1980; Botys ruficostalis Lederer, 1855; Spilodes nitetisalis Walker, 1859

= Hodebertia =

Genus of moths

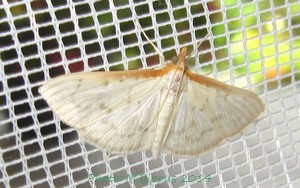
Hodebertia testalis

Hodebertia is a genus of micro-moth of the family Crambidae. It contains only one species, Hodebertia testalis, and is found in the tropics, but ranges north to parts of Europe on occasion.

== Description ==
Adults are white, with two ragged brown arcs across each wing. The larvae feed on Hibiscus, Gomphocarpus and Asclepias species (including Asclepias curassavica).

== Distribution ==
Hodebertia testalis is an African tropical species which has been recorded in the Democratic Republic of Congo, Kenya, Madagascar, Mozambique, Réunion, Saint Helena, Somalia, South Africa and Zambia. It is occasionally found in Europe and has been reported from Croatia, England (St Mary's, Isles of Scilly), France, Greece, Italy, Portugal, Spain and Switzerland. Elsewhere it has been found in Australia (Queensland), India, Indonesia, Japan, Saudi Arabia, Sri Lanka, Syria, Taiwan and Yemen.
