= Calamotropha discellus =

Scientific classification
- Kingdom: Animalia
- Phylum: Arthropoda
- Clade: Pancrustacea
- Class: Insecta
- Order: Lepidoptera
- Family: Crambidae
- Subfamily: Crambinae
- Tribe: Calamotrophini
- Genus: Calamotropha
- Species: C. discellus

Binomial name
- Calamotropha discellus (Walker, 1863)

Synonyms
- Chilo discellus Walker, 1863; Crambus mesoscia Hampson, 1919

Species of moth

Calamotropha discellus is a moth in the family Crambidae. It was described by the British entomologist, Francis Walker in 1863. It is found in Madagascar, South Africa and Gambia.
