= Marwitzia dichocrocis =

Scientific classification
- Kingdom: Animalia
- Phylum: Arthropoda
- Class: Insecta
- Order: Lepidoptera
- Family: Crambidae
- Genus: Marwitzia
- Species: M. dichocrocis

Binomial name
- Marwitzia dichocrocis (Hampson, 1913)

Synonyms
- Noorda dichocrocis Hampson, 1913; Dichocrocis polystidzalis Hampson, 1918; Marwitzia polystidzalis

Species of moth

Marwitzia dichocrocis is a moth in the family Crambidae. It was described by George Hampson in 1913. It is found in Ghana, South Africa and Uganda.
