= Pyrausta cinnamomealis =

Scientific classification
- Kingdom: Animalia
- Phylum: Arthropoda
- Class: Insecta
- Order: Lepidoptera
- Family: Crambidae
- Genus: Pyrausta
- Species: P. cinnamomealis

Binomial name
- Pyrausta cinnamomealis (Wallengren, 1860)

Synonyms
- Rhodaria cinnamomealis Wallengren, 1860

Species of moth

Pyrausta cinnamomealis is a moth in the family Crambidae. It was described by Wallengren in 1860. It is found in Cape of Good Hope, South Africa.
