= Syllepte purpurascens =

Scientific classification
- Kingdom: Animalia
- Phylum: Arthropoda
- Class: Insecta
- Order: Lepidoptera
- Family: Crambidae
- Genus: Syllepte
- Species: S. purpurascens

Binomial name
- Syllepte purpurascens (Hampson, 1899)

Synonyms
- Sylepta purpurascens Hampson, 1899

Species of moth

Syllepte purpurascens is a moth in the family Crambidae. It was described by George Hampson in 1899. It is found in the Democratic Republic of the Congo, Kenya, South Africa and Tanzania.

The wingspan is about 36 mm. Adults are dark fuscous, suffused with purple, the forewings with the antemedial line slightly defined by grey on the inner side. There is a quadrate white spot in the end of the cell. The postmedial line is defined by grey on the outer side, with two dentate white marks below the costa, strongly excurved between veins 5 and 2, then retracted to below the angle of the cell, then excurved again. The hindwings have traces of a discoidal spot. The medial line is excurved between veins 5 and 2, and slightly defined by grey on the outer side.
