= Calamotropha argenteociliella =

Scientific classification
- Kingdom: Animalia
- Phylum: Arthropoda
- Clade: Pancrustacea
- Class: Insecta
- Order: Lepidoptera
- Family: Crambidae
- Subfamily: Crambinae
- Tribe: Calamotrophini
- Genus: Calamotropha
- Species: C. argenteociliella

Binomial name
- Calamotropha argenteociliella Pagenstecher, 1893

Species of moth

Calamotropha argenteociliella is a moth in the family Crambidae. It was described by Arnold Pagenstecher in 1893. It is found in Mozambique.
