= Calamotropha anticella =

Scientific classification
- Kingdom: Animalia
- Phylum: Arthropoda
- Clade: Pancrustacea
- Class: Insecta
- Order: Lepidoptera
- Family: Crambidae
- Subfamily: Crambinae
- Tribe: Calamotrophini
- Genus: Calamotropha
- Species: C. anticella

Binomial name
- Calamotropha anticella (Walker, 1866)

Synonyms
- Ancylolomia anticella Walker, 1866

Species of moth

Calamotropha anticella is a moth in the family Crambidae. It was described by Francis Walker in 1866. It is found in South Africa and Sri Lanka.

== Description ==
Its wingspan is about 24–26 mm. In the male, the head and thorax are greyish suffused with coppery brown. Abdomen whitish. Forewings with costal and inner areas grey irrorated (sprinkled) with fuscous. The median area streaked with coppery brown. A black speck is found at the origin of vein 2. A postmedial line is excurved from costa to vein 6, then reduced to a series of specks. The interspaces of the outer area are streaked with white. A marginal series of black specks is present. Hindwings white slightly tinged with brown. Female with pure white hindwings.
