= Sameodesma undilinealis =

Scientific classification
- Kingdom: Animalia
- Phylum: Arthropoda
- Class: Insecta
- Order: Lepidoptera
- Family: Crambidae
- Genus: Sameodesma
- Species: S. undilinealis

Binomial name
- Sameodesma undilinealis Hampson, 1918

Species of moth

Sameodesma undilinealis is a moth in the family Crambidae. It is found in Zimbabwe.
