= Prionapteryx albimaculalis =

Scientific classification
- Kingdom: Animalia
- Phylum: Arthropoda
- Clade: Pancrustacea
- Class: Insecta
- Order: Lepidoptera
- Family: Crambidae
- Subfamily: Crambinae
- Tribe: Ancylolomiini
- Genus: Prionapteryx
- Species: P. albimaculalis

Binomial name
- Prionapteryx albimaculalis (Hampson, 1919)

Synonyms
- Prosmixis albimaculalis Hampson, 1919; Prionapteryx albimaculata Mey, 2011; Loxophantis pretoriella Błeszyński, 1970

Species of moth

Prionapteryx albimaculalis is a moth in the family Crambidae. It was described by George Hampson in 1919. It is found in Namibia, South Africa and Zimbabwe.
