= Anania fusalis =

Scientific classification
- Kingdom: Animalia
- Phylum: Arthropoda
- Clade: Pancrustacea
- Class: Insecta
- Order: Lepidoptera
- Family: Crambidae
- Genus: Anania
- Species: A. fusalis

Binomial name
- Anania fusalis (Hampson, 1912)

Synonyms
- Nacoleia fusalis Hampson, 1912; Lamprosema hottentota Hampson, 1918; Pionea epiphoenicealis Hampson, 1913; Pyrausta conistrotalis Hampson in Poulton, 1916

Species of moth

Anania fusalis is a moth in the family Crambidae. It was described by George Hampson in 1912. It is found in Cameroon, Equatorial Guinea, Kenya, Nigeria, Sierra Leone, South Africa, Tanzania and Uganda.
