= Culladiella sinuimargo =

Scientific classification
- Kingdom: Animalia
- Phylum: Arthropoda
- Clade: Pancrustacea
- Class: Insecta
- Order: Lepidoptera
- Family: Crambidae
- Genus: Culladiella
- Species: C. sinuimargo

Binomial name
- Culladiella sinuimargo (Hampson, 1919)

Synonyms
- Culladia sinuimargo Hampson, 1919

Species of moth

Culladiella sinuimargo is a moth in the family Crambidae. It was described by George Hampson in 1919. It is found in South Africa.

== Overview ==
The head and thorax of the culladiella sinuimargo are white and speckled with dark brown spots, and the abdomen is white tinged with reddish brown. The wings are white, with finely pencilled black-brown lines, with scattered dark brown and black spots.
