= Calamotropha argyrostola =

Scientific classification
- Kingdom: Animalia
- Phylum: Arthropoda
- Clade: Pancrustacea
- Class: Insecta
- Order: Lepidoptera
- Family: Crambidae
- Subfamily: Crambinae
- Tribe: Calamotrophini
- Genus: Calamotropha
- Species: C. argyrostola

Binomial name
- Calamotropha argyrostola (Hampson, 1919)

Synonyms
- Crambus argyrostola Hampson, 1919

Species of moth

Calamotropha argyrostola is a moth in the family Crambidae. It was described by George Hampson in 1919. It is found in South Africa.
