= Calamotropha torpidellus =

Scientific classification
- Kingdom: Animalia
- Phylum: Arthropoda
- Clade: Pancrustacea
- Class: Insecta
- Order: Lepidoptera
- Family: Crambidae
- Subfamily: Crambinae
- Tribe: Calamotrophini
- Genus: Calamotropha
- Species: C. torpidellus

Binomial name
- Calamotropha torpidellus (Zeller, 1852)

Synonyms
- Chilo torpidellus Zeller, 1852

Species of moth

Calamotropha torpidellus is a moth in the family Crambidae. It was described by Zeller in 1852. It is found in South Africa.
