= Sameodesma xanthocraspia =

Scientific classification
- Kingdom: Animalia
- Phylum: Arthropoda
- Class: Insecta
- Order: Lepidoptera
- Family: Crambidae
- Genus: Sameodesma
- Species: S. xanthocraspia

Binomial name
- Sameodesma xanthocraspia (Hampson, 1913)

Synonyms
- Thliptoceras xanthocraspia Hampson, 1913; Oeobia anthocosma Meyrick, 1933; Sameodes flavicostalis Hampson, 1918

Species of moth

Sameodesma xanthocraspia is a moth in the family Crambidae. It is found in the Democratic Republic of Congo (North Kivu), Ghana, South Africa and Zimbabwe.
