= Argentochiloides meridionalis =

Scientific classification
- Domain: Eukaryota
- Kingdom: Animalia
- Phylum: Arthropoda
- Class: Insecta
- Order: Lepidoptera
- Family: Crambidae
- Subfamily: Crambinae
- Tribe: incertae sedis
- Genus: Argentochiloides
- Species: A. meridionalis

Binomial name
- Argentochiloides meridionalis Bassi, 1999

Species of moth

Argentochiloides meridionalis is a moth in the family Crambidae. It was described by Graziano Bassi in 1999. It is found in South Africa.
