= Afroscoparia contemptalis =

Scientific classification
- Kingdom: Animalia
- Phylum: Arthropoda
- Clade: Pancrustacea
- Class: Insecta
- Order: Lepidoptera
- Family: Crambidae
- Genus: Afroscoparia
- Species: A. contemptalis

Binomial name
- Afroscoparia contemptalis (Walker, 1866)

Synonyms
- Scoparia contemptalis Walker, 1866

Species of moth

Afroscoparia contemptalis is a moth in the family Crambidae. It was described by Francis Walker in 1866. It is found in South Africa, where it is found in the south-western part of the Western Cape Province.

The length of the forewings is 6.5-8.5 mm for males and 7.5–8 mm for females.
