= Lirabotys rufitincta =

Scientific classification
- Kingdom: Animalia
- Phylum: Arthropoda
- Class: Insecta
- Order: Lepidoptera
- Family: Crambidae
- Genus: Lirabotys
- Species: L. rufitincta

Binomial name
- Lirabotys rufitincta (Hampson, 1913)

Synonyms
- Pyrausta rufitincta Hampson, 1913

Species of moth

Lirabotys rufitincta is a moth in the family Crambidae. It was described by George Hampson in 1913. It is found in South Africa.
