= Samuel Constant Snellen van Vollenhoven =

Dutch entomologist (1816–1880)

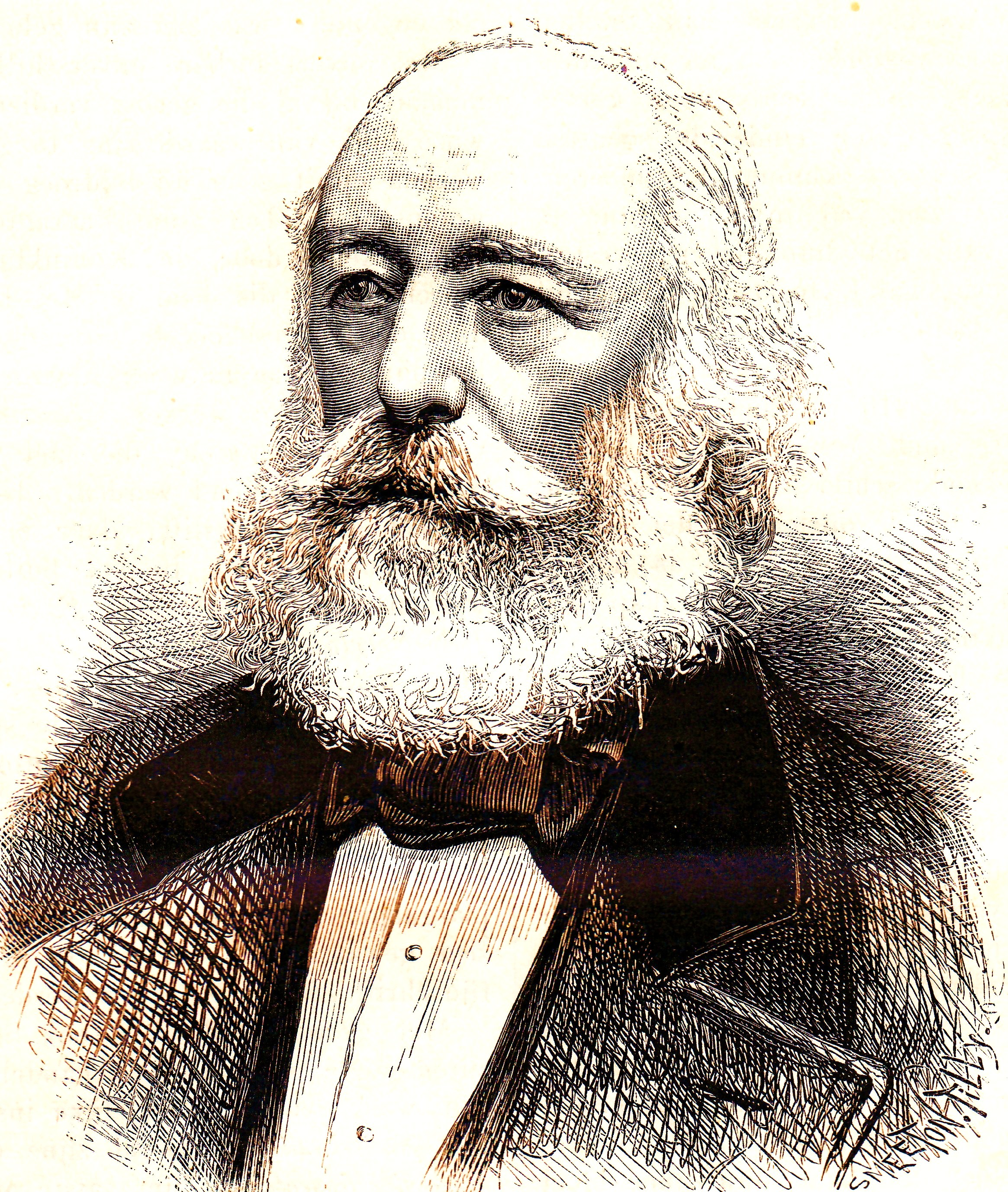
S. C. Snellen van Vollenhoven

Samuel Constant Snellen van Vollenhoven (18 October 1816, Rotterdam – 22 March 1880) was a Dutch entomologist. He is not to be confused with Pieter Cornelius Tobias Snellen another entomologist from Rotterdam.

He was curator of the entomological collections for the Natural History Museum, Leiden from 1854 to 1873, when he retired due to health problems. In 1857 he founded Tijdschrift voor Entomologie, a journal of systematic and evolutionary entomology published by the Netherlands Entomological Society. Snellen van Vollenhoven was a founder member of this Society. He described 9 genera and 471 species of insects. With Frederik Maurits van der Wulp he compiled the first checklist of the Diptera of the Netherlands.
