= Stanisław Błeszyński =

Polish entomologist (1927–1969)

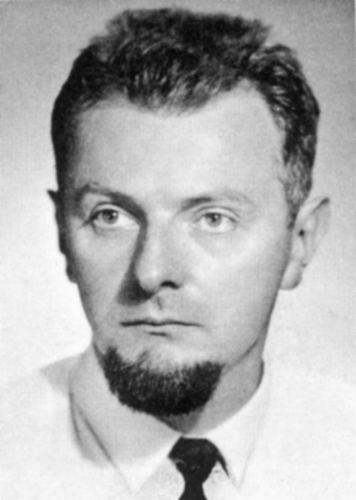
- Stanisław Błeszyński
- Born: 13 August 1927; Kraków, Poland
- Died: 24 December 1969 (aged 42); Bonn, West Germany
- Scientific career
- Fields: Entomology
- Workplaces: PhD Jagiellonian University; Hab. Maria Curie-Skłodowska University

Stanisław Błeszyński (13 August 1927 – 24 December 1969) was a Polish entomologist and lepidopterist specializing in Crambidae, the grass moths.

Błeszyński worked at the Institute of Systematics and Evolution of Animals of the Polish Academy of Sciences.

Stanislaw Bleszynski died in a car crash on Dec. 24th 1969 near Bonn, Germany.
