= Thaumatopsis magnificus =

Scientific classification
- Domain: Eukaryota
- Kingdom: Animalia
- Phylum: Arthropoda
- Class: Insecta
- Order: Lepidoptera
- Family: Crambidae
- Subfamily: Crambinae
- Tribe: Crambini
- Genus: Thaumatopsis
- Species: T. magnificus

Binomial name
- Thaumatopsis magnificus (Fernald, 1891)

Synonyms
- Propexus magnificus Fernald, 1891

Species of moth

Thaumatopsis magnificus is a moth in the family Crambidae. It was described by Charles H. Fernald in 1891. It is found in North America, where it has been recorded from New Mexico, Arizona and Colorado.

The wingspan is about 25 mm. The forewings are dull yellow with white stripes. The hindwings are uniform white. Adults are on wing in June and July.
