= Epina alleni =

Scientific classification
- Domain: Eukaryota
- Kingdom: Animalia
- Phylum: Arthropoda
- Class: Insecta
- Order: Lepidoptera
- Family: Crambidae
- Subfamily: Crambinae
- Tribe: incertae sedis
- Genus: Epina
- Species: E. alleni

Binomial name
- Epina alleni (Fernald, 1888)

Synonyms
- Diatraea alleni Fernald, 1888

Species of moth

Epina alleni is a moth in the family Crambidae. It was described by Charles H. Fernald in 1888. It is found in North America, where it has been recorded from Indiana, Maine, Massachusetts, Pennsylvania and South Carolina.

The wingspan is about 25–30 mm. Adults have cream hindwings with a dark brown terminal line. Adults have been recorded on wing from June to August.
