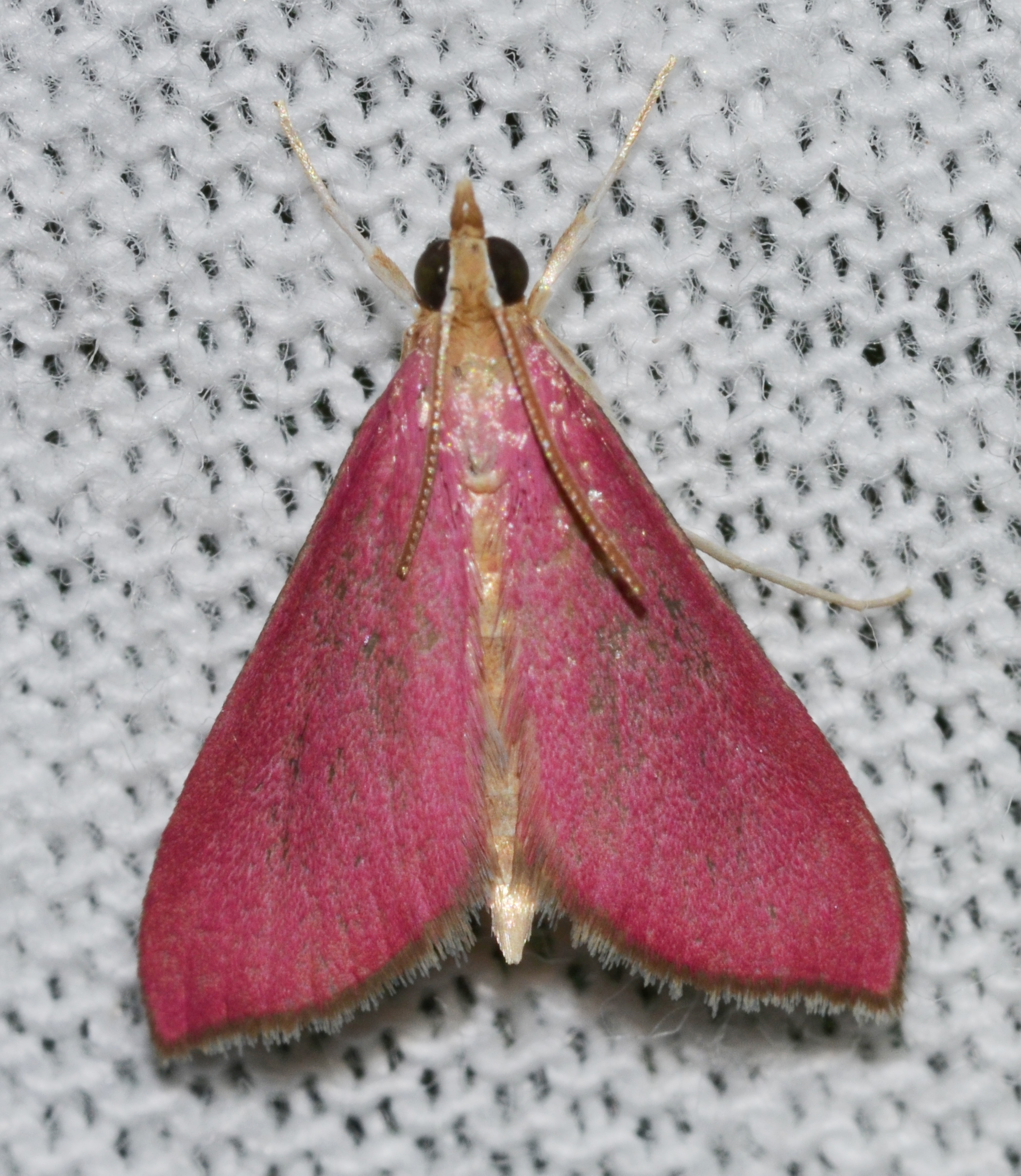

Scientific classification
- Kingdom: Animalia
- Phylum: Arthropoda
- Clade: Pancrustacea
- Class: Insecta
- Order: Lepidoptera
- Family: Crambidae
- Genus: Pyrausta
- Species: P. inornatalis

Binomial name
- Pyrausta inornatalis (Fernald, 1885)

Synonyms
- Botis inornatalis Fernald, 1885; Syllythria rosa Druce, 1895

= Pyrausta inornatalis =

Species of moth

Pyrausta inornatalis, the inornate pyrausta moth, is a moth in the family Crambidae. It was described by Charles H. Fernald in 1885. It is found in United States, where it has been recorded from Arizona, California, Florida, Arkansas, Kansas, Louisiana, Missouri, Oklahoma, Tennessee and Texas. It is also found in Mexico. It has also been recorded as being in Alabama, Illinois, Oregon, Georgia, Kentucky, Mississippi, North Carolina, South Carolina, Virginia, and West Virginia.

Since 2019, P. inornatalis is known to occur in Japan, where it is now established as a non-native species. The species was also observed in several locations in south-west France since 2024 and can now be considered established in Europe.

== Description ==
The wingspan of the imago is about 13-16 mm. The forewings are uniform reddish pink with no eye-spots or any other notable markings. The hindwings are pale brownish gray, but paler at the base and with a reddish pink along the outer margin. The abdomen of the moth is similar in color to the hindwings, with the thorax also having some of the reddish pink that is present on the forewings. The head of the moth hosts some brown antennae and mouth parts. The eyes are a yellowish green color and large. Adults have been recorded on wing from March to November.

== Larvae ==
Larvae which are fully grown are known to be a translucent light green in color with rows of spots that appear either black or black with white centers. The head of this larva is brown and has five stemmata. These fully grown larvae are typically up to 11 mm.

The color of the larvae can depend on the color of the host plant that the larvae consume, typically ranging from a bluish green to a pale red color.

== Pupae ==
The cocoon of this moth measures about 8 mm and is slim. The entire specimen will be a pale yellowish white color. The head has a pair of setae, with each consecutive segment also having a pair of setae, with an exception of the mesonotum and metanotum each having four pairs of setae. The antennae appear long and converge down the body posteriorly, though are shorter than the forewings.

== Host plants ==
The larvae of this moth feed primarily on Salvia species, including Salvia farinacea. They mainly feed on the flowers and buds of salvia species by boring into the unopened flowers near the base. Basil is a suspected possible alternative host plant for the larvae as well.

== Gallery ==
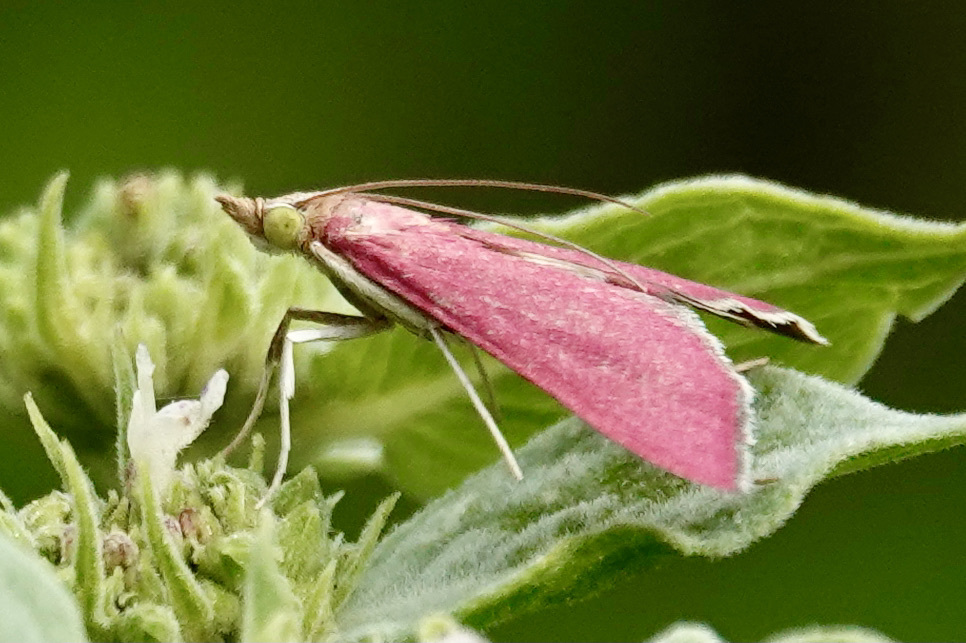
Pyrausta inorntalis seen from the left side

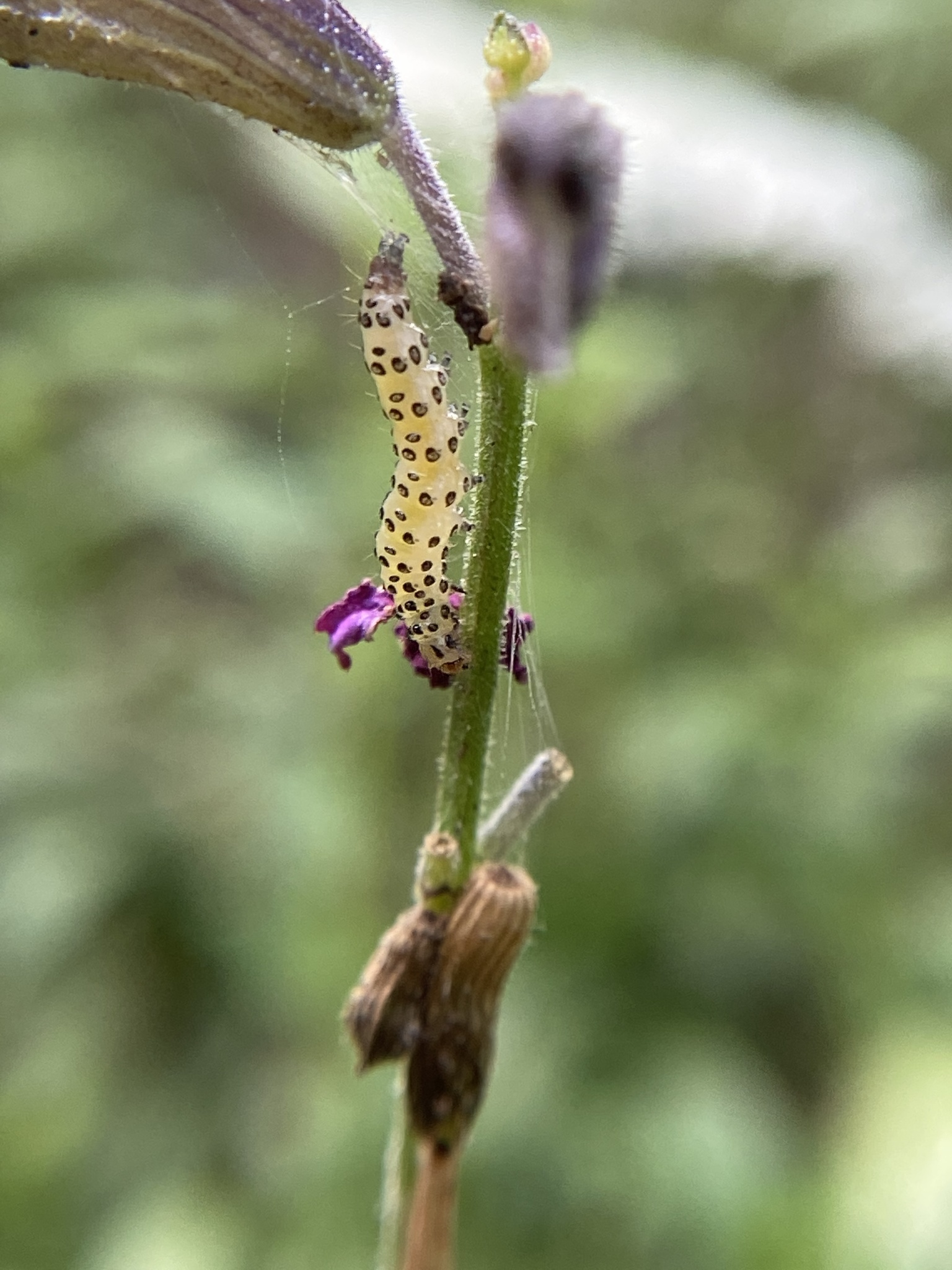
Larva of pyrausta inorntalis feeding on a host plant

Pyrausta inornatalis taking flight in Japan
