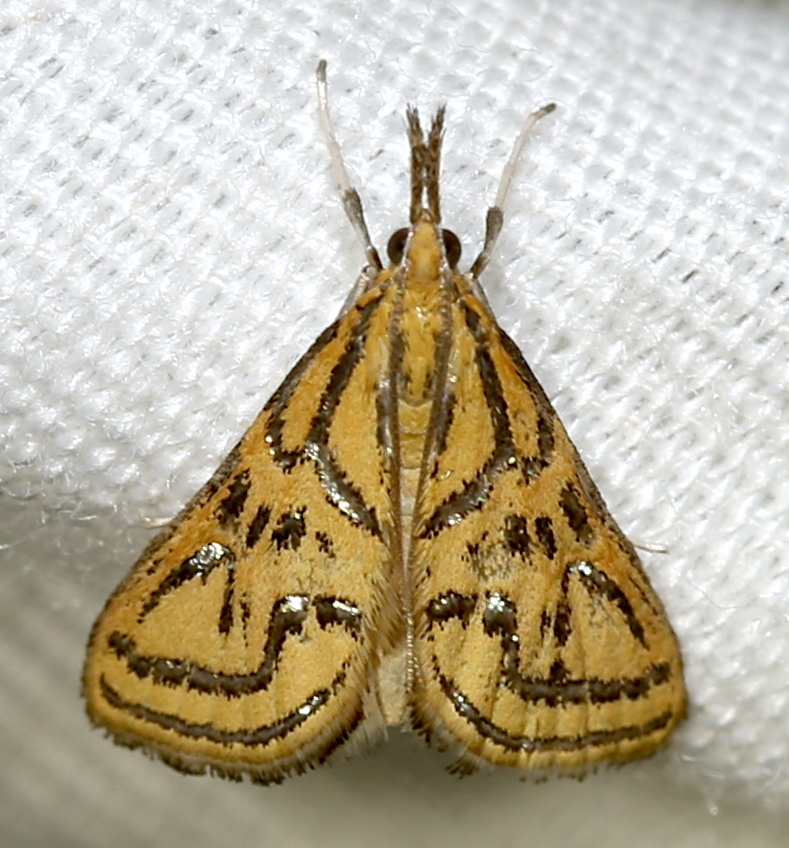

Scientific classification
- Kingdom: Animalia
- Phylum: Arthropoda
- Class: Insecta
- Order: Lepidoptera
- Family: Crambidae
- Genus: Daulia
- Species: D. magdalena

Binomial name
- Daulia magdalena (Fernald, 1892)

Synonyms
- Botys magdalena Fernald, 1892

= Daulia magdalena =

Species of moth

Daulia magdalena, the glittering Magdalena moth, is a moth in the family Crambidae. It was described by Charles H. Fernald in 1892. It is found in North America, where it has been recorded from Alabama and Florida.

The wingspan is 10 mm (0.39 in). Adults are on wing from August to April.
