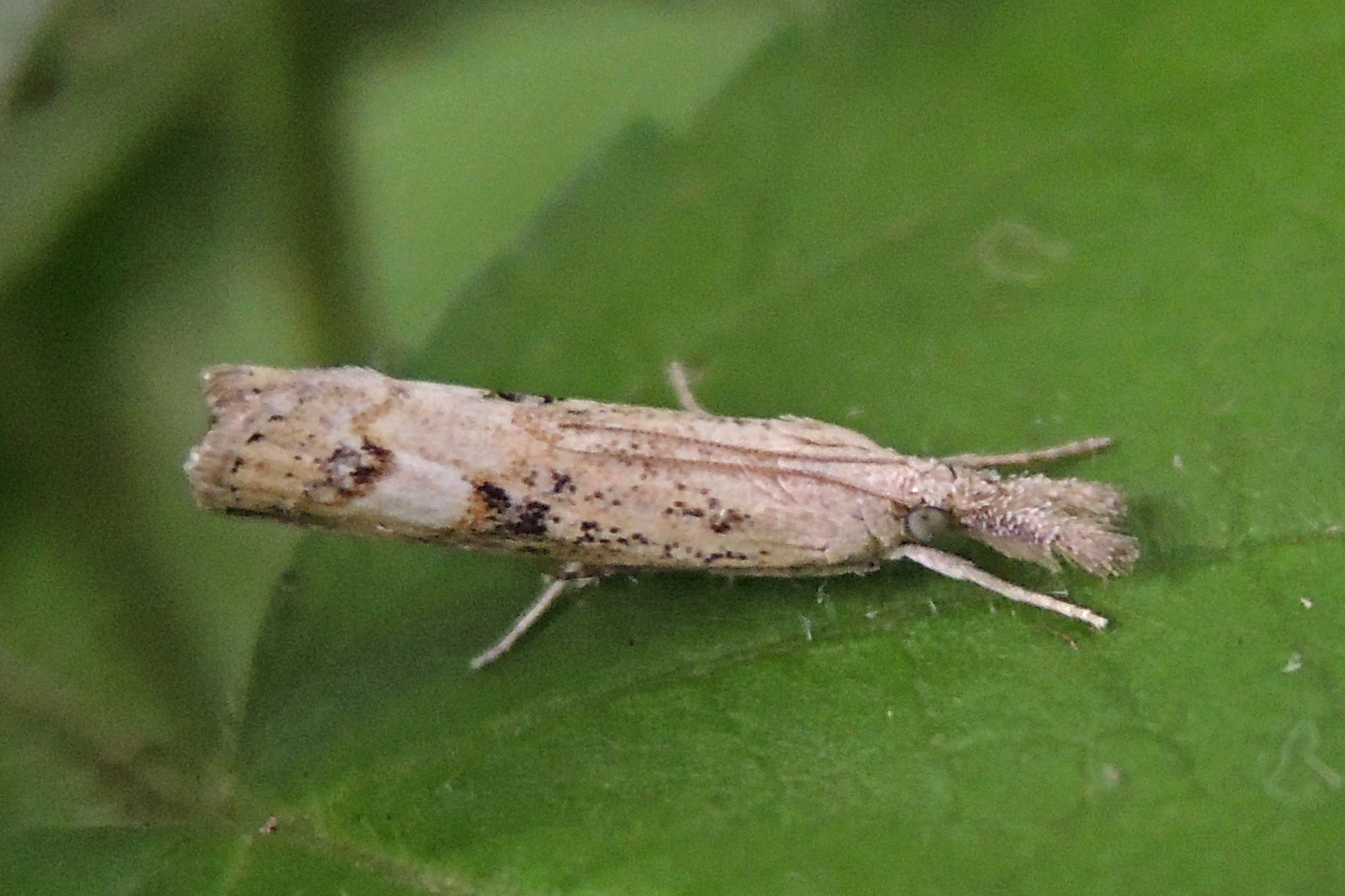

Scientific classification
- Kingdom: Animalia
- Phylum: Arthropoda
- Class: Insecta
- Order: Lepidoptera
- Family: Crambidae
- Subfamily: Crambinae
- Tribe: Crambini
- Genus: Neodactria
- Species: N. zeellus

Binomial name
- Neodactria zeellus (Fernald, 1885)

Synonyms
- Crambus zeellus Fernald, 1885

= Neodactria zeellus =

Species of moth

Neodactria zeellus is a species of moth in the family Crambidae. It was first described by Charles H. Fernald in 1885. It is found in North America, where it has been recorded from Alberta, Florida, Indiana, Maine, Maryland, Massachusetts, Mississippi, Ohio, Oklahoma, Pennsylvania and Tennessee.
