= Thaumatopsis bolterellus =

Scientific classification
- Domain: Eukaryota
- Kingdom: Animalia
- Phylum: Arthropoda
- Class: Insecta
- Order: Lepidoptera
- Family: Crambidae
- Subfamily: Crambinae
- Tribe: Crambini
- Genus: Thaumatopsis
- Species: T. bolterellus

Binomial name
- Thaumatopsis bolterellus (Fernald, 1887)

Synonyms
- Crambus bolterellus Fernald, 1887

Species of moth

Thaumatopsis bolterellus is a moth in the family Crambidae. It was described by Charles H. Fernald in 1887. It is found in North America, where it has been recorded from New Mexico and Texas.

The larvae probably feed on grasses.
