= Fissicrambus albilineellus =

Scientific classification
- Domain: Eukaryota
- Kingdom: Animalia
- Phylum: Arthropoda
- Class: Insecta
- Order: Lepidoptera
- Family: Crambidae
- Genus: Fissicrambus
- Species: F. albilineellus

Binomial name
- Fissicrambus albilineellus (Fernald, 1893)

Synonyms
- Crambus albilineellus Fernald, 1893; Crambus albilinellus Hampson, 1896

Species of moth

Fissicrambus albilineellus is a moth in the family Crambidae. It was described by Charles H. Fernald in 1893. It is found in North America, where it has been recorded from southern California.

The wingspan is about 24 mm (0.94 in). Adults are on wing from June to July.
