= Loxocrambus coloradellus =

Scientific classification
- Domain: Eukaryota
- Kingdom: Animalia
- Phylum: Arthropoda
- Class: Insecta
- Order: Lepidoptera
- Family: Crambidae
- Subfamily: Crambinae
- Tribe: Crambini
- Genus: Loxocrambus
- Species: L. coloradellus

Binomial name
- Loxocrambus coloradellus (Fernald, 1893)

Synonyms
- Crambus coloradellus Fernald, 1893

Species of moth

Loxocrambus coloradellus is a moth in the family Crambidae. It was described by Charles H. Fernald in 1893. It is found in North America, where it has been recorded from California and Colorado.

The wingspan is 17–22 mm. Adults have been recorded on wing in May and July.
