= Changeable =

Changeable may refer to:

- Changeable hawk-eagle, a species of bird
- Swift & Changeable, an unreleased album
- Changeable lizard, or Oriental garden lizard
- Changeable tree toad, or gray tree frog
- Changeable silk, clothes, or shot silk
- Changeable grass-veneer, or Fissicrambus mutabilis
