= Loxocrambus canellus =

Scientific classification
- Kingdom: Animalia
- Phylum: Arthropoda
- Clade: Pancrustacea
- Class: Insecta
- Order: Lepidoptera
- Family: Crambidae
- Subfamily: Crambinae
- Tribe: Crambini
- Genus: Loxocrambus
- Species: L. canellus

Binomial name
- Loxocrambus canellus Forbes, 1920

Species of moth

Loxocrambus canellus is a moth in the family Crambidae. It was described by William Trowbridge Merrifield Forbes in 1920. It is found in North America, where it has been recorded from Florida, Mississippi and Texas.

Its distinctive features include a lightest clay tint on the neckline and tegulae, with some of its legs being white. Torso appears to be white. The insect order Lepidoptera, which means "scaly-winged," is made up of both moths and butterflies. Thousands of tiny scales that overlap like roof tiles create the patterns and colors on their wings.
