= Daulia argyrophoralis =

Scientific classification
- Kingdom: Animalia
- Phylum: Arthropoda
- Class: Insecta
- Order: Lepidoptera
- Family: Crambidae
- Genus: Daulia
- Species: D. argyrophoralis

Binomial name
- Daulia argyrophoralis Hampson, 1907

Species of moth

Daulia argyrophoralis is a moth in the family Crambidae. It was described by George Hampson in 1907. It is found in Argentina.
