= Maria Elizabeth Fernald =

American entomologist (1839-1919)

- Born: May 24, 1839
- Died: October 6, 1919 (aged 80)
- Other name: Maria Elizabeth Smith
- Spouse: Charles H. Fernald
- Children: Henry Torsey Fernald
- Scientific career
- Fields: Entomology

Maria Elizabeth Smith Fernald (May 24, 1839 – October 6, 1919) was an American entomologist who wrote a major reference book, A Catalogue of the Coccidae of the World. She was also instrumental in identifying the caterpillar form of the economically destructive European spongy moth following its introduction into North America.

== Education ==
Maria Elizabeth Smith was born on May 24, 1839, to Ebenezer and Betsy (Torsey) Smith of Monmouth, Maine. She attended the Maine Wesleyan Seminary and Female College, graduating in the school's first class. She stayed at the school as an instructor for a time.

In 1862 or 1863, she married entomologist Charles H. Fernald, whom she had tutored in music. They had a son, Henry Torsey Fernald, in 1866, who also became an entomologist. She became interested in entomology through her husband and began her education in the subject in the 1870s by collecting insects for him around Maine State College in Orono, where he was teaching at the time.

== Career ==
Fernald developed into a capable and respected entomologist, an expert on the Coccidae, Tortricidae, and Tineidae families of moths and one of only a handful of women in a field that would remain almost exclusively male for another century. In the late 1870s, she began a catalogue of the family Tortricidae, commonly known as tortrix moths or leafroller moths. She later expanded this to include North American insects of all kinds, and one section of this work was published as A Catalogue of the Coccidae of the World in 1903. This "gigantic piece of work" as one authority called it, enumerated more than 1500 species and served as a vital reference work in a rapidly expanding field of knowledge. It was particularly valuable to investigators researching scale insects, which are highly destructive to agriculture, and it was still in use as a classic text decades after Fernald's death.

Around 1886, the Fernalds moved from Maine to Amherst, Massachusetts, where Charles took up a professorship at Massachusetts Agricultural College and was put in charge of the recently founded Massachusetts Agricultural Experiment Station. Three years later, the first of a devastating series of European gypsy moth plagues broke out—the first major outbreak since the insect's arrival in North America two decades earlier. Fernald had taken over the entomological work at the Experiment Station in Charles's absence, and thanks to her knowledge of Lepidoptera, she was able to quickly identify the caterpillars responsible for that first infestation, providing the key to subsequent control efforts.

Fernald died on October 6, 1919.
