= Neodactria modestellus =

Scientific classification
- Domain: Eukaryota
- Kingdom: Animalia
- Phylum: Arthropoda
- Class: Insecta
- Order: Lepidoptera
- Family: Crambidae
- Subfamily: Crambinae
- Tribe: Crambini
- Genus: Neodactria
- Species: N. modestellus

Binomial name
- Neodactria modestellus (Barnes & McDunnough, 1918)

Synonyms
- Crambus modestellus Barnes & McDunnough, 1918

Species of moth

Neodactria modestellus is a moth in the family Crambidae. It was described by William Barnes and James Halliday McDunnough in 1918. It is found in North America, where it has been recorded from Texas.
