= Thaumatopsis actuellus =

Scientific classification
- Domain: Eukaryota
- Kingdom: Animalia
- Phylum: Arthropoda
- Class: Insecta
- Order: Lepidoptera
- Family: Crambidae
- Subfamily: Crambinae
- Tribe: Crambini
- Genus: Thaumatopsis
- Species: T. actuellus

Binomial name
- Thaumatopsis actuellus Barnes & McDunnough, 1918

Species of moth

Thaumatopsis actuellus is a moth in the family Crambidae. It was described by William Barnes and James Halliday McDunnough in 1918. It is found in North America, where it has been recorded from Florida and Texas.

The wingspan is 23 mm. Adults have been recorded on wing in May, July and November.
