= Loxocrambus awemensis =

Scientific classification
- Domain: Eukaryota
- Kingdom: Animalia
- Phylum: Arthropoda
- Class: Insecta
- Order: Lepidoptera
- Family: Crambidae
- Subfamily: Crambinae
- Tribe: Crambini
- Genus: Loxocrambus
- Species: L. awemensis

Binomial name
- Loxocrambus awemensis McDunnough, 1929

Species of moth

Loxocrambus awemensis is a moth in the family Crambidae. It was described by James Halliday McDunnough in 1929. It is found in North America, where it has been recorded from Manitoba, Alberta, Michigan and Ontario. The habitat consists of sand dunes.

The wingspan is 22–25 mm. Adults are on wing in July and August.

Larvae have been reared from a pupa in a sand tube near dune grasses.
