= Thaumatopsis fernaldella =

Scientific classification
- Kingdom: Animalia
- Phylum: Arthropoda
- Class: Insecta
- Order: Lepidoptera
- Family: Crambidae
- Subfamily: Crambinae
- Tribe: Crambini
- Genus: Thaumatopsis
- Species: T. fernaldella

Binomial name
- Thaumatopsis fernaldella Kearfott, 1905

Synonyms
- Thaumatopsis fernaldella lagunella Dyar, 1912; Thaumatopsis fernaldella nortella Kearfott, 1905

Species of moth

Thaumatopsis fernaldella is a moth in the family Crambidae. It was described by William D. Kearfott in 1905. It is found in North America, where it has been recorded from Alberta, California, Florida, Maryland, Mississippi, Nevada, New Mexico, Oklahoma, Saskatchewan and Texas. The habitat consists of prairies.

The wingspan is 23–31 mm. Adults are on wing from April to October.
