= Epina =

Scientific classification
- Domain: Eukaryota
- Kingdom: Animalia
- Phylum: Arthropoda
- Class: Insecta
- Order: Lepidoptera
- Family: Crambidae
- Subfamily: Crambinae
- Tribe: incertae sedis
- Genus: Epina; Walker, 1866

Synonyms
- Diatraenopsis Dyar & Heinrich, 1927

Genus of moths

Epina is a genus of moths of the family Crambidae.

== Species ==
- Epina alleni (Fernald, 1888)
- Epina dichromella (Walker, 1866)
