= Fissicrambus artos =

Scientific classification
- Domain: Eukaryota
- Kingdom: Animalia
- Phylum: Arthropoda
- Class: Insecta
- Order: Lepidoptera
- Family: Crambidae
- Genus: Fissicrambus
- Species: F. artos

Binomial name
- Fissicrambus artos Błeszyński, 1963

Species of moth

Fissicrambus artos is a moth in the family Crambidae. It was described by Stanisław Błeszyński in 1963. It is found in Santa Catarina, Brazil.
