= Thaumatopsis digrammellus =

Scientific classification
- Kingdom: Animalia
- Phylum: Arthropoda
- Class: Insecta
- Order: Lepidoptera
- Family: Crambidae
- Subfamily: Crambinae
- Tribe: Crambini
- Genus: Thaumatopsis
- Species: T. digrammellus

Binomial name
- Thaumatopsis digrammellus (Hampson, 1919)

Synonyms
- Crambus digrammellus Hampson, 1919

Species of moth

Thaumatopsis digrammellus is a moth in the family Crambidae. It was described by George Hampson in 1919. It is found in Mexico.
