= Neodactria caliginosellus =

Scientific classification
- Kingdom: Animalia
- Phylum: Arthropoda
- Clade: Pancrustacea
- Class: Insecta
- Order: Lepidoptera
- Family: Crambidae
- Subfamily: Crambinae
- Tribe: Crambini
- Genus: Neodactria
- Species: N. caliginosellus

Binomial name
- Neodactria caliginosellus (Clemens, 1860)

Synonyms
- Crambus caliginosellus Clemens, 1860; Pediasia caliginosellus

Species of moth

Neodactria caliginosellus, the corn root webworm or black grass-veneer, is a moth in the family Crambidae. It was described by James Brackenridge Clemens in 1860. It is found in North America, where it has been recorded from Alabama, Alberta, California, Florida, Georgia, Illinois, Indiana, Maine, Maryland, Mississippi, North Carolina, Ohio, Oklahoma, Ontario, South Carolina and Tennessee. The habitat consists of grassy areas and fields.

The larvae feed on turf grasses and corn stalks. They have a pale white to gray body.
