= Fissicrambus quadrinotellus =

Scientific classification
- Kingdom: Animalia
- Phylum: Arthropoda
- Clade: Pancrustacea
- Class: Insecta
- Order: Lepidoptera
- Family: Crambidae
- Genus: Fissicrambus
- Species: F. quadrinotellus

Binomial name
- Fissicrambus quadrinotellus (Zeller, 1877)

Synonyms
- Crambus quadrinotellus Zeller, 1877

Species of moth

Fissicrambus quadrinotellus is a moth in the family Crambidae. It was described by Zeller in 1877. It is found in Panama and North America, where it has been recorded from Florida and Texas.

The wingspan is about 20 mm. Adults have been recorded on wing from April to May, August to September and in December in the southern United States.
