= Daulia subaurealis =

Scientific classification
- Kingdom: Animalia
- Phylum: Arthropoda
- Class: Insecta
- Order: Lepidoptera
- Family: Crambidae
- Genus: Daulia
- Species: D. subaurealis

Binomial name
- Daulia subaurealis (Walker, 1866)

Synonyms
- Lepyrodes subaurealis Walker, 1866

Species of moth

Daulia subaurealis is a moth in the family Crambidae. It was described by Francis Walker in 1866. It is found in South Africa.
