= Neodactria oktibbeha =

Scientific classification
- Kingdom: Animalia
- Phylum: Arthropoda
- Clade: Pancrustacea
- Class: Insecta
- Order: Lepidoptera
- Family: Crambidae
- Subfamily: Crambinae
- Tribe: Crambini
- Genus: Neodactria
- Species: N. oktibbeha

Binomial name
- Neodactria oktibbeha Landry & Brown, 2005

Species of moth

Neodactria oktibbeha is a moth in the family Crambidae. It was described by Bernard Landry and Richard L. Brown in 2005. It is found in central Mississippi, where it is only known from prairie remnants in the Black Belt (geological formation) of Oktibbeha and Lowndes counties.
