= Fissicrambus intermedius =

Scientific classification
- Domain: Eukaryota
- Kingdom: Animalia
- Phylum: Arthropoda
- Class: Insecta
- Order: Lepidoptera
- Family: Crambidae
- Genus: Fissicrambus
- Species: F. intermedius

Binomial name
- Fissicrambus intermedius (Kearfott, 1908)

Synonyms
- Crambus intermedius Kearfott, 1908

Species of moth

Fissicrambus intermedius is a moth in the family Crambidae. It was described by William D. Kearfott in 1908. It has been recorded from the US states of Arizona, California and Texas.

The wingspan is 16–20 mm. The forewings are dark ocherous above a median white streak and light ocherous below it as well as on the outer third. The hindwings are white in males and whitish gray in females. Adults are on wing from March to May and from August to October.
