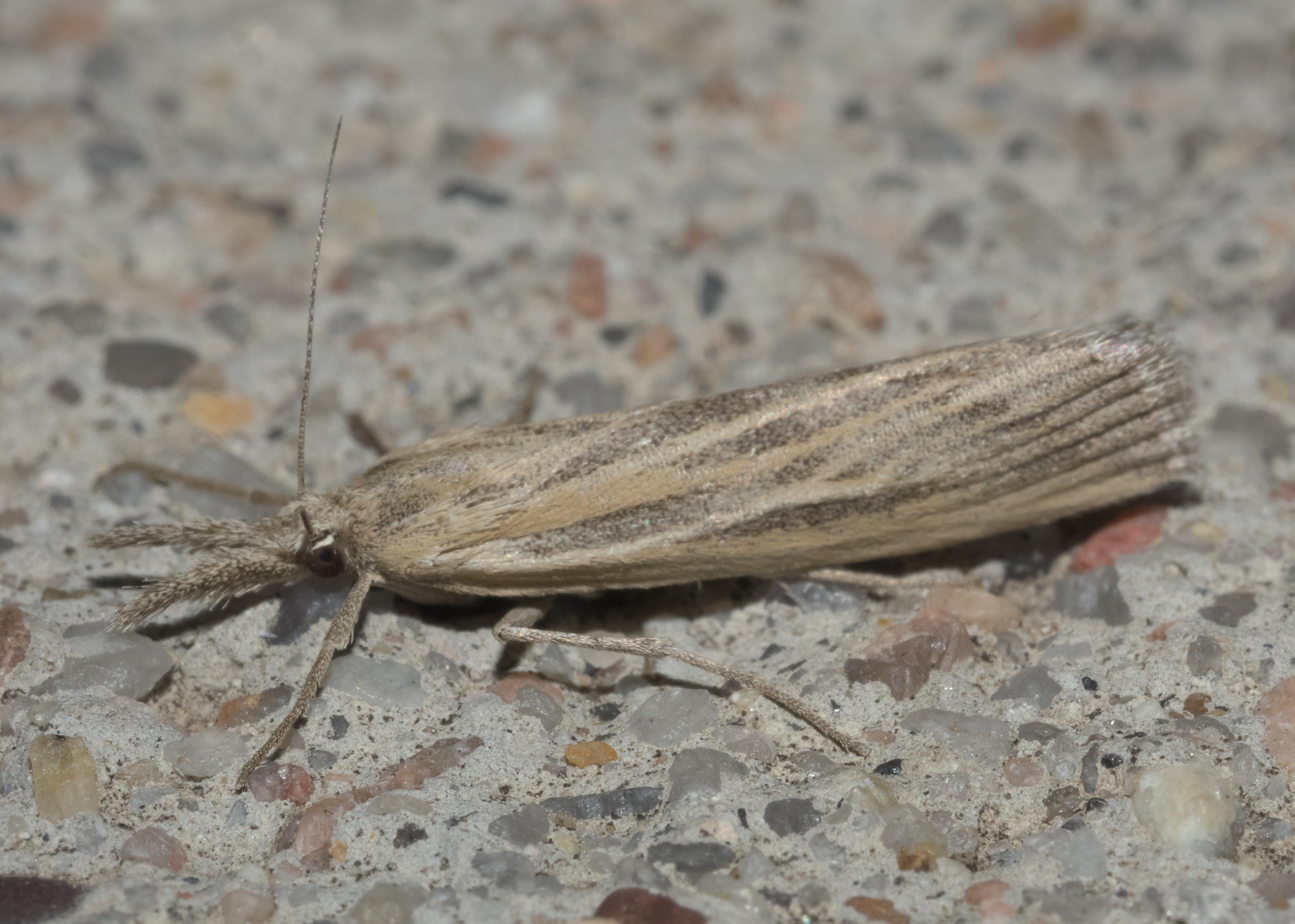

Scientific classification
- Kingdom: Animalia
- Phylum: Arthropoda
- Clade: Pancrustacea
- Class: Insecta
- Order: Lepidoptera
- Family: Crambidae
- Subfamily: Crambinae
- Tribe: Crambini
- Genus: Thaumatopsis
- Species: T. pexellus

Binomial name
- Thaumatopsis pexellus (Zeller, 1863)

Synonyms
- Crambus pexellus Zeller, 1863; Crambus macropterellus Zeller, 1863; Thaumatopsis longipalpus Morrison, 1874; Ubida pexellus strictalis Dyar, 1914; Thaumatopsis idion Dyar, 1919; Thaumatopsis pexella

= Thaumatopsis pexellus =

Species of moth

Thaumatopsis pexellus, the woolly grass-veneer, is a moth in the family Crambidae. It was described by Philipp Christoph Zeller in 1863. It is found in most of North America. The habitat consists of grasslands.

The wingspan is 21–32 mm. Adults are on wing from July to early September in most of the range.

The larvae feed on various grasses.

== Subspecies ==
- Thaumatopsis pexellus pexellus
- Thaumatopsis pexellus coloradella Kearfott, 1908 (Colorado, California, Alberta)
- Thaumatopsis pexellus gibsonella Kearfott, 1908
- Thaumatopsis pexellus strictalis (Dyar, 1914) (Mexico)
