= Neodactria murellus =

Scientific classification
- Kingdom: Animalia
- Phylum: Arthropoda
- Class: Insecta
- Order: Lepidoptera
- Family: Crambidae
- Subfamily: Crambinae
- Tribe: Crambini
- Genus: Neodactria
- Species: N. murellus

Binomial name
- Neodactria murellus (Dyar, 1904)

Synonyms
- Crambus murellus Dyar, 1904; Crambus simpliciellus Kearfott, 1908

Species of moth

Neodactria murellus is a moth in the family Crambidae. It was described by Harrison Gray Dyar Jr. in 1904. It is found in North America, where it has been recorded from Arkansas, British Columbia, Colorado, Illinois, Indiana, Manitoba, Michigan, New Jersey, Ohio, Oklahoma and Washington. The habitat consists of tallgrass prairies.

Adults have been recorded on wing from May to August.

The larvae probably feed on various grasses.
