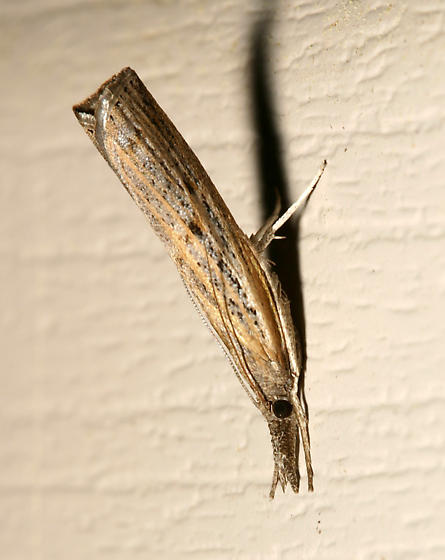

Scientific classification
- Kingdom: Animalia
- Phylum: Arthropoda
- Class: Insecta
- Order: Lepidoptera
- Family: Crambidae
- Genus: Fissicrambus
- Species: F. profanellus

Binomial name
- Fissicrambus profanellus (Walker, 1866)

Synonyms
- Crambus profanellus Walker, 1866

= Fissicrambus profanellus =

Species of moth

Fissicrambus profanellus is a moth of the family Crambidae. It is found in the southern part of the United States (including Alabama, Florida, South Carolina and Texas), the Caribbean (including Jamaica and the Virgin Islands) and Central America (including Nicaragua).

The wingspan is about 23 mm.
