= Thaumatopsis edonis =

Scientific classification
- Kingdom: Animalia
- Phylum: Arthropoda
- Class: Insecta
- Order: Lepidoptera
- Family: Crambidae
- Subfamily: Crambinae
- Tribe: Crambini
- Genus: Thaumatopsis
- Species: T. edonis

Binomial name
- Thaumatopsis edonis (Grote, 1880)

Synonyms
- Crambus (Propexus) edonis Grote, 1880

Species of moth

Thaumatopsis edonis is a moth in the family Crambidae. It was described by Augustus Radcliffe Grote in 1880. It is found in North America, where it has been recorded from Florida, Kentucky, Maine, Massachusetts, Mississippi, Missouri, Nebraska, New Jersey, Oklahoma and South Carolina. It is listed as threatened in the US state of Connecticut.

The wingspan is about 34 mm. Adults have been recorded on wing from August to November.
