= Fissicrambus minuellus =

Scientific classification
- Kingdom: Animalia
- Phylum: Arthropoda
- Class: Insecta
- Order: Lepidoptera
- Family: Crambidae
- Genus: Fissicrambus
- Species: F. minuellus

Binomial name
- Fissicrambus minuellus (Walker, 1863)

Synonyms
- Crambus minuellus Walker, 1863; Crambus santiagellus Schaus, 1922; Crambus habanella Schaus, 1922

Species of moth

Fissicrambus minuellus is a moth in the family Crambidae. It was described by Francis Walker in 1863. It is found in Honduras, Cuba, Puerto Rico and Florida.
