= Loxocrambus =

Scientific classification
- Kingdom: Animalia
- Phylum: Arthropoda
- Clade: Pancrustacea
- Class: Insecta
- Order: Lepidoptera
- Family: Crambidae
- Tribe: Crambini
- Genus: Loxocrambus; Forbes, 1920

Genus of insects

Loxocrambus is a genus of moths of the family Crambidae.

== Species ==
- Loxocrambus awemensis McDunnough, 1929
- Loxocrambus canellus Forbes, 1920
- Loxocrambus coloradellus (Fernald, 1893)
- Loxocrambus hospition (Błeszyński, 1963)
- Loxocrambus mohaviellus Forbes, 1920
