= Loxocrambus hospition =

Scientific classification
- Kingdom: Animalia
- Phylum: Arthropoda
- Clade: Pancrustacea
- Class: Insecta
- Order: Lepidoptera
- Family: Crambidae
- Subfamily: Crambinae
- Tribe: Crambini
- Genus: Loxocrambus
- Species: L. hospition

Binomial name
- Loxocrambus hospition (Błeszyński, 1963)

Synonyms
- Fissicrambus hospition Błeszyński, 1963

Species of moth

Loxocrambus hospition is a moth in the family Crambidae. It was described by Stanisław Błeszyński in 1963. It is found in North America, where it has been recorded from western Texas, through New Mexico to southern Arizona.

Adults are on wing from July to August.
