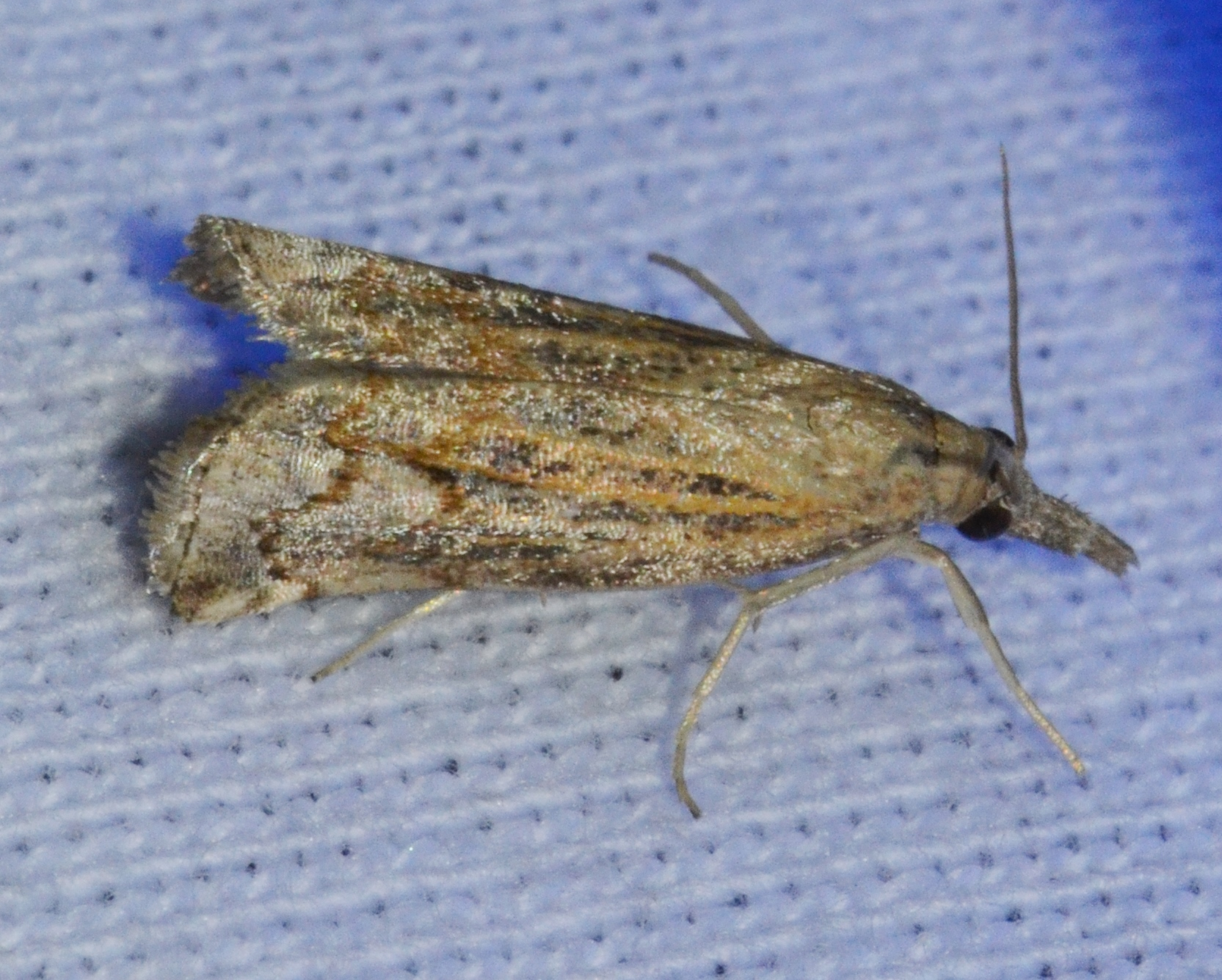
- Neodactria luteolellus

Scientific classification
- Kingdom: Animalia
- Phylum: Arthropoda
- Clade: Pancrustacea
- Class: Insecta
- Order: Lepidoptera
- Family: Crambidae
- Tribe: Crambini
- Genus: Neodactria; B. Landry, 1995

= Neodactria =

Genus of moths

Neodactria is a genus of moths of the family Crambidae.

== Species ==
- Neodactria caliginosellus (Clemens, 1860)
- Neodactria cochisensis Landry & Albu, 2012
- Neodactria daemonis Landry & Klots in Landry & Brown, 2005
- Neodactria glenni Landry & Klots in Landry & Metzler, 2002
- Neodactria luteolellus (Clemens, 1860)
- Neodactria modestellus (Barnes & McDunnough, 1918)
- Neodactria murellus (Dyar, 1904)
- Neodactria oktibbeha Landry & Brown, 2005
- Neodactria zeellus (Fernald, 1885)
