= Thaumatopsis crenulatella =

Scientific classification
- Kingdom: Animalia
- Phylum: Arthropoda
- Clade: Pancrustacea
- Class: Insecta
- Order: Lepidoptera
- Family: Crambidae
- Subfamily: Crambinae
- Tribe: Crambini
- Genus: Thaumatopsis
- Species: T. crenulatella

Binomial name
- Thaumatopsis crenulatella Kearfott, 1908

Species of moth

Thaumatopsis crenulatella is a moth in the family Crambidae. It was described by William D. Kearfott in 1908. It is found in the US states of Arizona, California, Colorado and Nevada.
