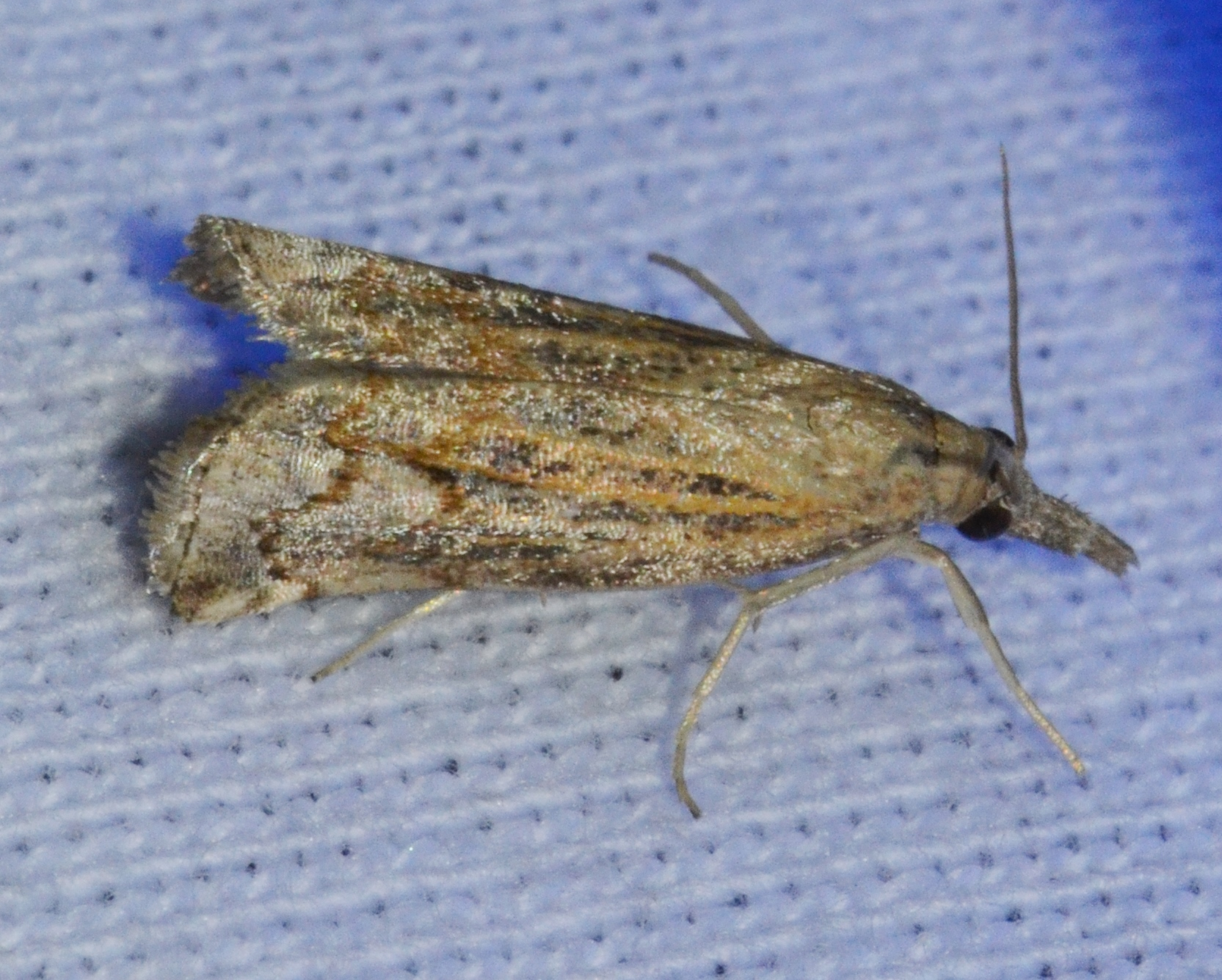

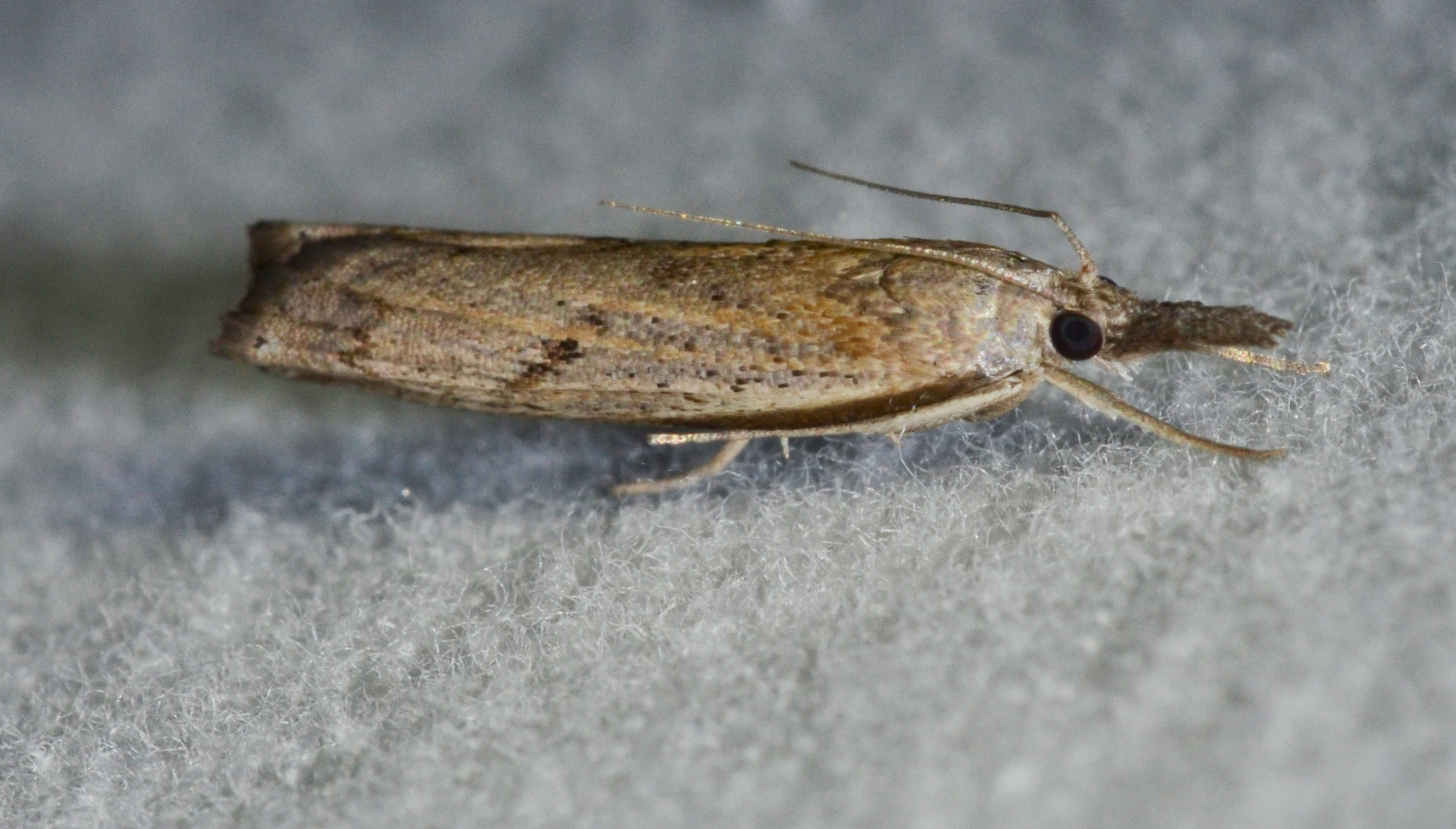

Scientific classification
- Kingdom: Animalia
- Phylum: Arthropoda
- Clade: Pancrustacea
- Class: Insecta
- Order: Lepidoptera
- Family: Crambidae
- Subfamily: Crambinae
- Tribe: Crambini
- Genus: Neodactria
- Species: N. luteolellus

Binomial name
- Neodactria luteolellus (Clemens, 1860)

Synonyms
- Crambus luteolellus Clemens, 1860; Crambus edredellus Schaus, 1922; Crambus duplicatus Grote, 1880; Crambus ulae Cockerell, 1888; Crambus holochrellus Fernald, 1896; Neodactria luteolellus refotalis Hulst, 1886

= Neodactria luteolellus =

Species of moth

Neodactria luteolellus, the mottled grass-veneer, is a moth in the family Crambidae. It was described by James Brackenridge Clemens in 1860. It is found in North America, where it has been recorded from Labrador and Quebec to North Carolina, west to Arizona and California and north to Alberta. The habitat consists of grassland areas in prairies, aspen parklands and boreal forests.

The wingspan is 13–24 mm. Adults are on wing from late June to mid-July in one generation per year.

The larvae feed on grasses.
