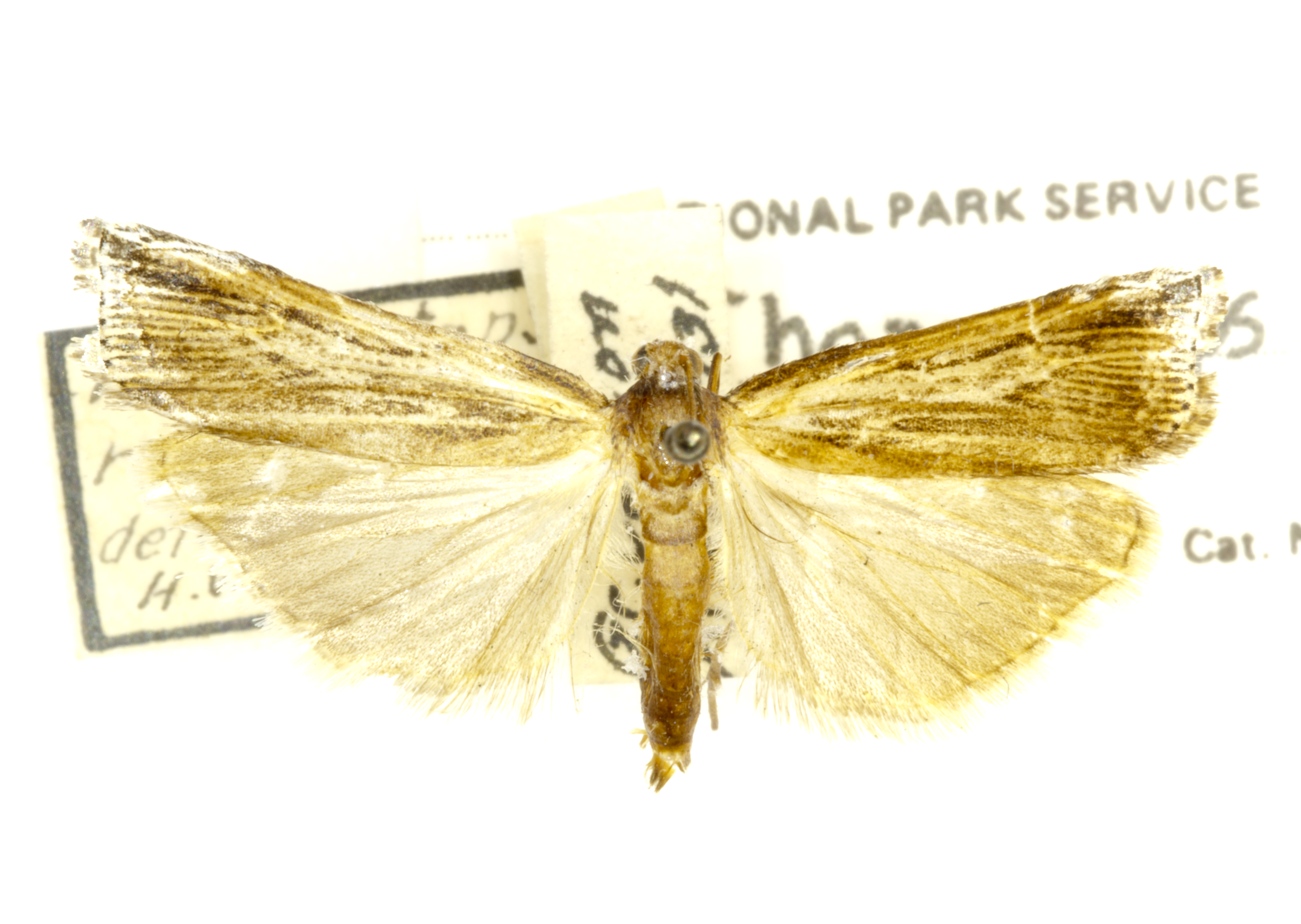

Scientific classification
- Kingdom: Animalia
- Phylum: Arthropoda
- Class: Insecta
- Order: Lepidoptera
- Family: Crambidae
- Subfamily: Crambinae
- Tribe: Crambini
- Genus: Thaumatopsis
- Species: T. repandus

Binomial name
- Thaumatopsis repandus (Grote, 1880)

Synonyms
- Crambus repandus Grote, 1880

= Thaumatopsis repandus =

Species of moth

Thaumatopsis repandus is a moth in the family Crambidae. It was described by Augustus Radcliffe Grote in 1880. It is found in North America, where it has been recorded from Arizona, British Columbia, California, Colorado, New Mexico, Oregon and Washington.
