= Thaumatopsis solutellus =

Scientific classification
- Kingdom: Animalia
- Phylum: Arthropoda
- Clade: Pancrustacea
- Class: Insecta
- Order: Lepidoptera
- Family: Crambidae
- Subfamily: Crambinae
- Tribe: Crambini
- Genus: Thaumatopsis
- Species: T. solutellus

Binomial name
- Thaumatopsis solutellus (Zeller, 1863)

Synonyms
- Crambus solutellus Zeller, 1863; Thaumatopsis daeckeellus Kearfott, 1903; Thaumatopsis daeckellus Bleszynski & Collins, 1962; Thaumatopsis striatellus Fernald, 1896

Species of moth

Thaumatopsis solutellus is a moth in the family Crambidae. It was described by Zeller in 1863. It is found in North America, where it has been recorded from Indiana, Maryland, Massachusetts, New Hampshire, New Jersey and Ontario.

The wingspan is 20–23 mm. Adults are on wing in September and October.
