= Fissicrambus hirundellus =

Scientific classification
- Domain: Eukaryota
- Kingdom: Animalia
- Phylum: Arthropoda
- Class: Insecta
- Order: Lepidoptera
- Family: Crambidae
- Genus: Fissicrambus
- Species: F. hirundellus

Binomial name
- Fissicrambus hirundellus Błeszyński, 1967

Species of moth

Fissicrambus hirundellus is a moth in the family Crambidae. It was described by Stanisław Błeszyński in 1967. It is found in Suriname.
