= Thaumatopsis fieldella =

Scientific classification
- Domain: Eukaryota
- Kingdom: Animalia
- Phylum: Arthropoda
- Class: Insecta
- Order: Lepidoptera
- Family: Crambidae
- Subfamily: Crambinae
- Tribe: Crambini
- Genus: Thaumatopsis
- Species: T. fieldella

Binomial name
- Thaumatopsis fieldella Barnes & McDunnough, 1912

Species of moth

Thaumatopsis fieldella is a moth in the family Crambidae. It was described by William Barnes and James Halliday McDunnough in 1912. It is found in North America, where it has been recorded from California.
