= Loxocrambus mohaviellus =

Scientific classification
- Kingdom: Animalia
- Phylum: Arthropoda
- Clade: Pancrustacea
- Class: Insecta
- Order: Lepidoptera
- Family: Crambidae
- Subfamily: Crambinae
- Tribe: Crambini
- Genus: Loxocrambus
- Species: L. mohaviellus

Binomial name
- Loxocrambus mohaviellus Forbes, 1920

Species of moth

Loxocrambus mohaviellus is a moth in the family Crambidae. It was described by William Trowbridge Merrifield Forbes in 1920. It is found in North America, where it has been recorded from California.
