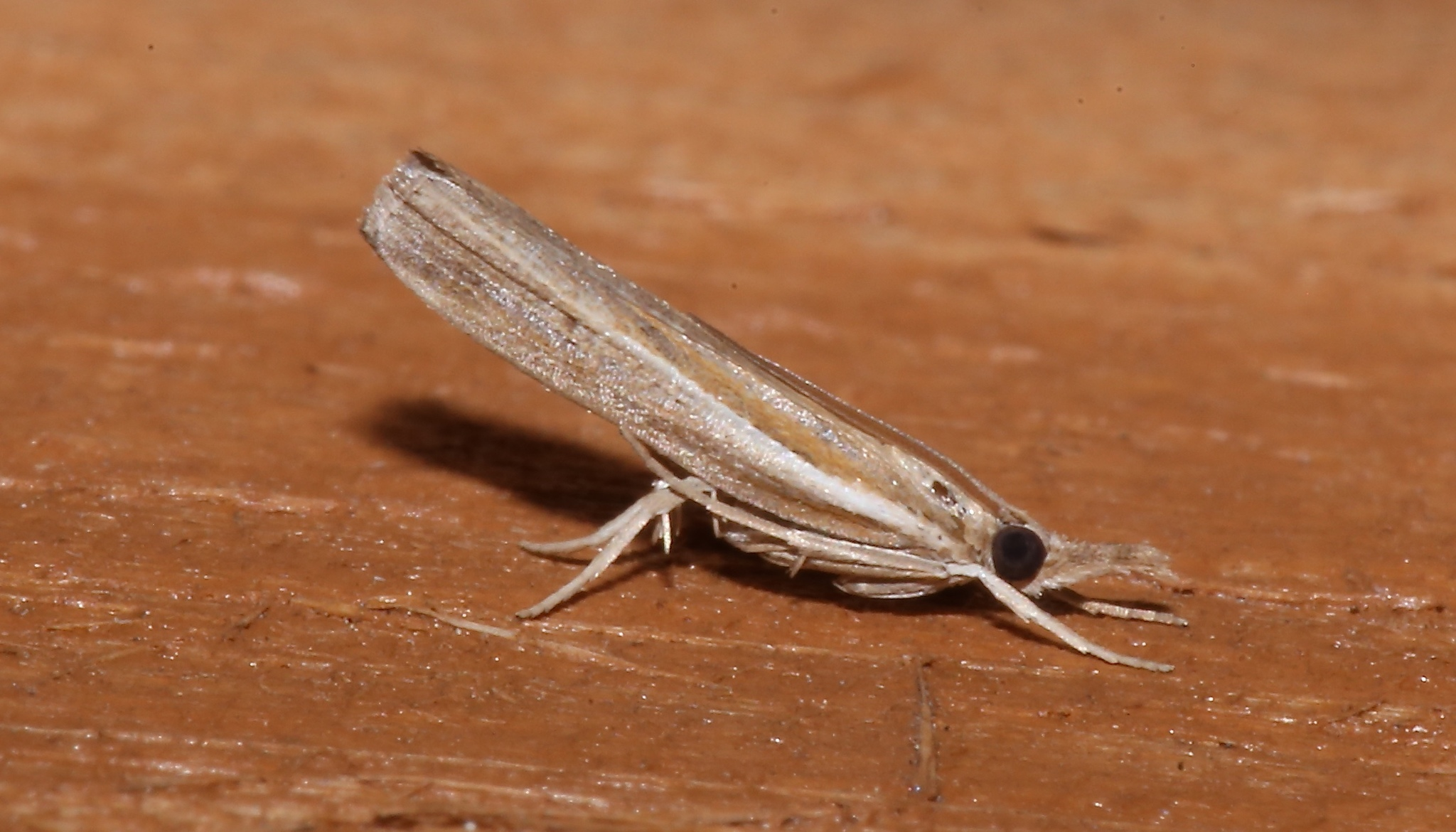

Scientific classification
- Domain: Eukaryota
- Kingdom: Animalia
- Phylum: Arthropoda
- Class: Insecta
- Order: Lepidoptera
- Family: Crambidae
- Genus: Fissicrambus
- Species: F. haytiellus

Binomial name
- Fissicrambus haytiellus (Zincken, 1821)

Synonyms
- Chilo haytiellus Zincken, 1821

= Fissicrambus haytiellus =

Carpet-grass webworm moth

Species of moth

Fissicrambus haytiellus, the carpet-grass webworm moth, is a moth in the family Crambidae. It was described by Zincken in 1821. It is found in the Dominican Republic, Cuba and the United States, where it has been recorded from Alabama, Florida, North Carolina and Texas.
