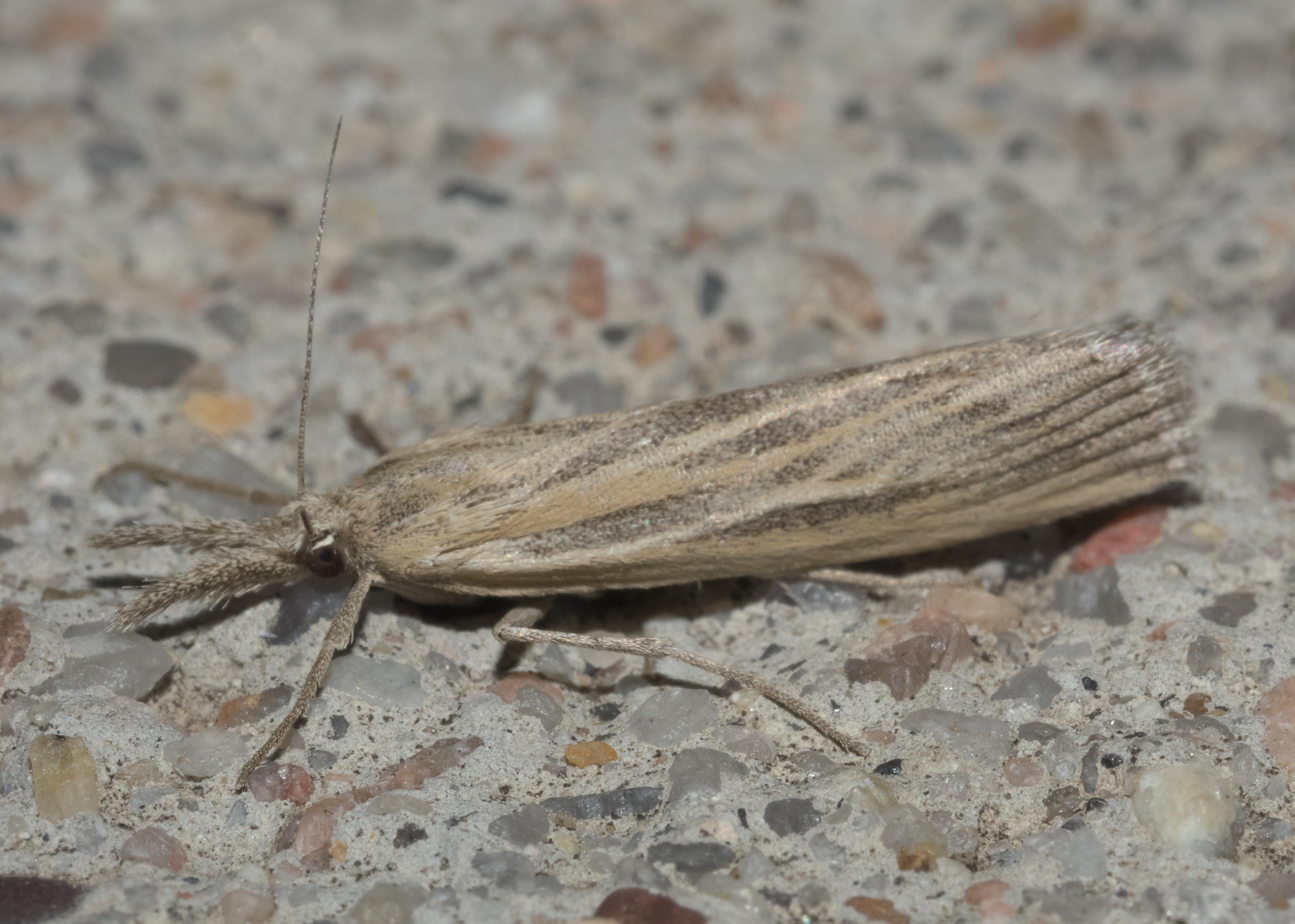
- Thaumatopsis pexellus

Scientific classification
- Domain: Eukaryota
- Kingdom: Animalia
- Phylum: Arthropoda
- Class: Insecta
- Order: Lepidoptera
- Family: Crambidae
- Tribe: Crambini
- Genus: Thaumatopsis; Morrison, 1874

Synonyms
- Propexus Grote, 1880

= Thaumatopsis =

Genus of moths

Thaumatopsis is a genus of moths of the family Crambidae.

== Species ==
- Thaumatopsis actuellus Barnes & McDunnough, 1918
- Thaumatopsis atomosella Kearfott, 1908
- Thaumatopsis bolterellus (Fernald, 1887)
- Thaumatopsis crenulatella Kearfott, 1908
- Thaumatopsis digrammellus (Hampson, 1919)
- Thaumatopsis edonis (Grote, 1880)
- Thaumatopsis fernaldella Kearfott, 1905
- Thaumatopsis fieldella Barnes & McDunnough, 1912
- Thaumatopsis floridella Barnes & McDunnough, 1913
- Thaumatopsis magnificus (Fernald, 1891)
- Thaumatopsis melchiellus (Druce, 1896)
- Thaumatopsis pectinifer (Zeller, 1877)
- Thaumatopsis pexellus (Zeller, 1863)
- Thaumatopsis repandus (Grote, 1880)
- Thaumatopsis solutellus (Zeller, 1863)
