= Daulia argentuosalis =

Scientific classification
- Kingdom: Animalia
- Phylum: Arthropoda
- Class: Insecta
- Order: Lepidoptera
- Family: Crambidae
- Genus: Daulia
- Species: D. argentuosalis

Binomial name
- Daulia argentuosalis (C. Swinhoe, 1890)

Synonyms
- Girtexta argentuosalis C. Swinhoe, 1890

Species of moth

Daulia argentuosalis is a moth belonging to the Crambidae family. It was described by Charles Swinhoe in 1890. It is found in Myanmar.
