= Daulia arizonensis =

Scientific classification
- Domain: Eukaryota
- Kingdom: Animalia
- Phylum: Arthropoda
- Class: Insecta
- Order: Lepidoptera
- Family: Crambidae
- Genus: Daulia
- Species: D. arizonensis

Binomial name
- Daulia arizonensis Munroe, 1957

Species of moth

Daulia arizonensis is a moth in the family Crambidae. It was described by Eugene G. Munroe in 1957. It is found in North America, where it has been recorded from Arizona and Texas. In the south, the range extends from Mexico to Argentina.

The wingspan is 18 mm. Adults are on wing in March and May and from September to November.
