= Thaumatopsis floridella =

Scientific classification
- Domain: Eukaryota
- Kingdom: Animalia
- Phylum: Arthropoda
- Class: Insecta
- Order: Lepidoptera
- Family: Crambidae
- Subfamily: Crambinae
- Tribe: Crambini
- Genus: Thaumatopsis
- Species: T. floridella

Binomial name
- Thaumatopsis floridella Barnes & McDunnough, 1913

Synonyms
- Thaumatopsis floridalis Klots, 1983

Species of moth

Thaumatopsis floridella, the Floridian grass-veneer, is a moth in the family Crambidae. It was described by William Barnes and James Halliday McDunnough in 1913. It is found in North America, where it has been recorded from coastal areas in Florida, Georgia, Mississippi, South Carolina and North Carolina, New Jersey, New York, and Rhode Island. It is also found in Cuba.

The wingspan is 23–31 mm. Adults are on wing from May to September.
