= Neodactria cochisensis =

Scientific classification
- Domain: Eukaryota
- Kingdom: Animalia
- Phylum: Arthropoda
- Class: Insecta
- Order: Lepidoptera
- Family: Crambidae
- Subfamily: Crambinae
- Tribe: Crambini
- Genus: Neodactria
- Species: N. cochisensis

Binomial name
- Neodactria cochisensis Landry & Albu, 2012

Species of moth

Neodactria cochisensis is a moth in the family Crambidae. It was described by Bernard Landry and Valeriu Albu in 2012. It is found in North America, where it has been recorded from the Huachuca Mountains and Chiricahua Mountains in Arizona.

The length of the forewings is 6.5–7 mm for males and 8.5 mm for females.

== Etymology ==
The species name is derived from Cochise County, the type locality.
