= Fissicrambus fissiradiellus =

Scientific classification
- Kingdom: Animalia
- Phylum: Arthropoda
- Class: Insecta
- Order: Lepidoptera
- Family: Crambidae
- Genus: Fissicrambus
- Species: F. fissiradiellus

Binomial name
- Fissicrambus fissiradiellus (Walker, 1863)

Synonyms
- Crambus fissiradiellus Walker, 1863; Crambus curtellus Walker, 1863; Crambus gestatellus Möschler, 1890

Species of moth

Fissicrambus fissiradiellus is a moth in the family Crambidae. It was described by Francis Walker in 1863.

== Habitat ==
It is found in Puerto Rico, Jamaica, the Dominican Republic and North America, where it is Florida, Texas and Virginia.
