= Daulia auriplumbea =

Scientific classification
- Domain: Eukaryota
- Kingdom: Animalia
- Phylum: Arthropoda
- Class: Insecta
- Order: Lepidoptera
- Family: Crambidae
- Genus: Daulia
- Species: D. auriplumbea

Binomial name
- Daulia auriplumbea (Warren, 1914)

Synonyms
- Platytes auriplumbea Warren, 1914

Species of moth

Daulia auriplumbea is a moth in the family Crambidae. It was described by William Warren in 1914. It is found in South Africa and Mozambique.
