= Epina dichromella =

Scientific classification
- Kingdom: Animalia
- Phylum: Arthropoda
- Class: Insecta
- Order: Lepidoptera
- Family: Crambidae
- Subfamily: Crambinae
- Tribe: incertae sedis
- Genus: Epina
- Species: E. dichromella

Binomial name
- Epina dichromella Walker, 1866

Synonyms
- Chilo matanzalis Schaus, 1922; Diatraea differentialis Fernald, 1888

Species of moth

Epina dichromella is a moth in the family Crambidae. It was described by Francis Walker in 1866. It is found in Cuba and the eastern United States, where it has been recorded from Florida, Maryland, North Carolina and South Carolina.
