= Thaumatopsis atomosella =

Scientific classification
- Domain: Eukaryota
- Kingdom: Animalia
- Phylum: Arthropoda
- Class: Insecta
- Order: Lepidoptera
- Family: Crambidae
- Subfamily: Crambinae
- Tribe: Crambini
- Genus: Thaumatopsis
- Species: T. atomosella

Binomial name
- Thaumatopsis atomosella Kearfott, 1908

Species of moth

Thaumatopsis atomosella is a moth in the family Crambidae. It was described by William D. Kearfott in 1908. It is found in the US states of Arizona and California.
