= Thaumatopsis pectinifer =

Scientific classification
- Kingdom: Animalia
- Phylum: Arthropoda
- Clade: Pancrustacea
- Class: Insecta
- Order: Lepidoptera
- Family: Crambidae
- Subfamily: Crambinae
- Tribe: Crambini
- Genus: Thaumatopsis
- Species: T. pectinifer

Binomial name
- Thaumatopsis pectinifer (Zeller, 1877)

Synonyms
- Crambus pectinifer Zeller, 1877

Species of moth

Thaumatopsis pectinifer is a moth in the family Crambidae. It was described by Zeller in 1877. It is found in North America, where it has been recorded from North Dakota to Oklahoma, Texas and southern Florida, as well as Michigan and Indiana.

The wingspan is 19–22 mm. Adults are on wing in March, from May to June and from August to November.

The larvae feed on various grasses, including corn. They bore the stem of their host plant.
