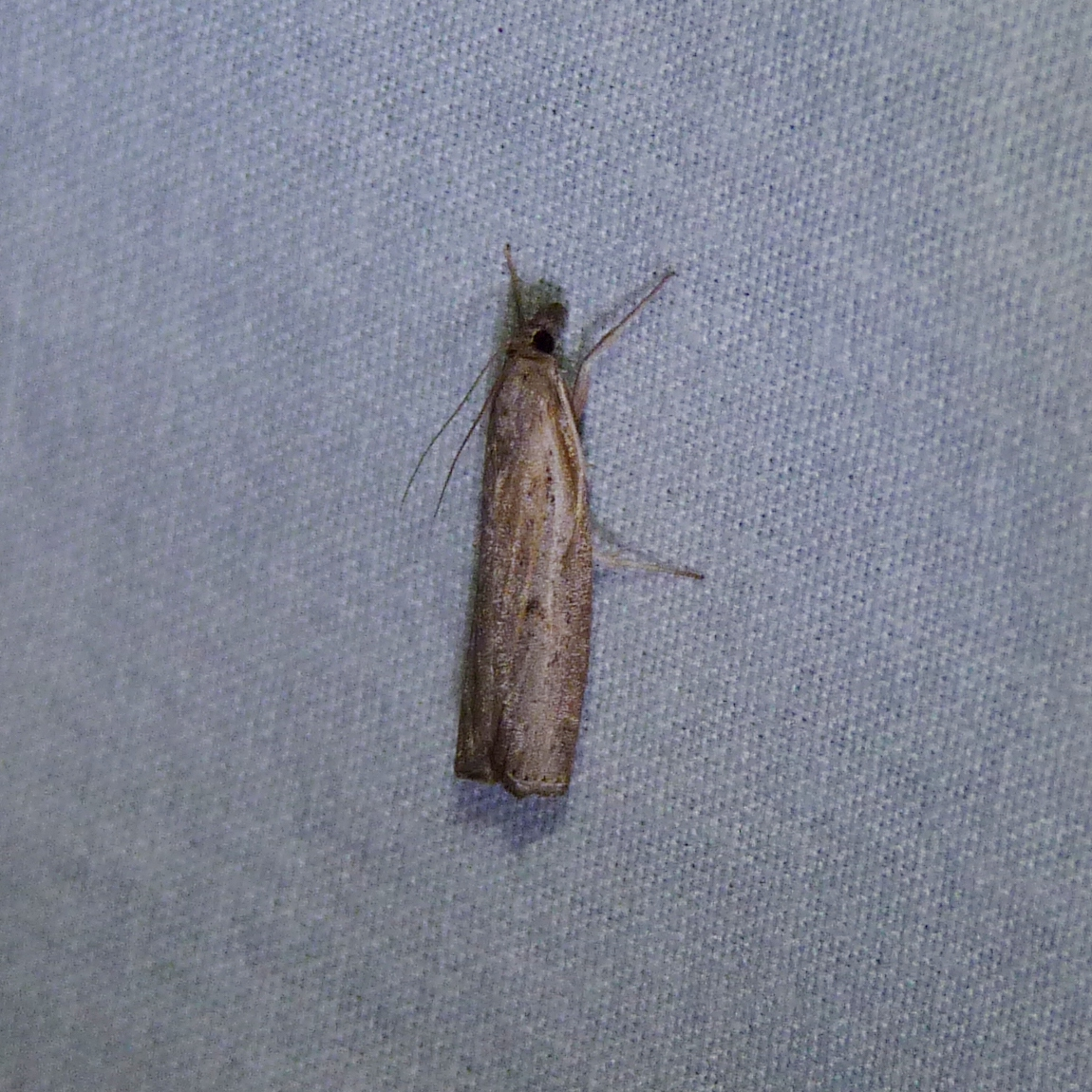
- Fissicrambus mutabilis

Scientific classification
- Domain: Eukaryota
- Kingdom: Animalia
- Phylum: Arthropoda
- Class: Insecta
- Order: Lepidoptera
- Family: Crambidae
- Tribe: Crambini
- Genus: Fissicrambus; Bleszynski, 1963

= Fissicrambus =

Genus of moths

Fissicrambus is a genus of moths of the family Crambidae.

== Species ==
- Fissicrambus adonis Bleszynski, 1963
- Fissicrambus albilineellus (Fernald, 1893)
- Fissicrambus alexanor Bleszynski, 1963
- Fissicrambus artos Bleszynski, 1963
- Fissicrambus briseis Bleszynski, 1963
- Fissicrambus fissiradiellus (Walker, 1863)
- Fissicrambus haytiellus (Zincken, 1821)
- Fissicrambus hemiochrellus (Zeller, 1877)
- Fissicrambus hirundellus Bleszynski, 1967
- Fissicrambus intermedius (Kearfott, 1908)
- Fissicrambus minuellus (Walker, 1863)
- Fissicrambus mutabilis (Clemens, 1860)
- Fissicrambus orion Bleszynski, 1963
- Fissicrambus porcellus Bleszynski, 1967
- Fissicrambus profanellus (Walker, 1866)
- Fissicrambus quadrinotellus (Zeller, 1877)
- Fissicrambus verselias Bleszynski, 1963
