= Thaumatopsis melchiellus =

Scientific classification
- Domain: Eukaryota
- Kingdom: Animalia
- Phylum: Arthropoda
- Class: Insecta
- Order: Lepidoptera
- Family: Crambidae
- Subfamily: Crambinae
- Tribe: Crambini
- Genus: Thaumatopsis
- Species: T. melchiellus

Binomial name
- Thaumatopsis melchiellus (H. Druce, 1896)

Synonyms
- Crambus melchiellus H. Druce, 1896

Species of moth

Thaumatopsis melchiellus is a moth in the family Crambidae. It was described by Herbert Druce in 1896. It is found in Guerrero, Mexico.
