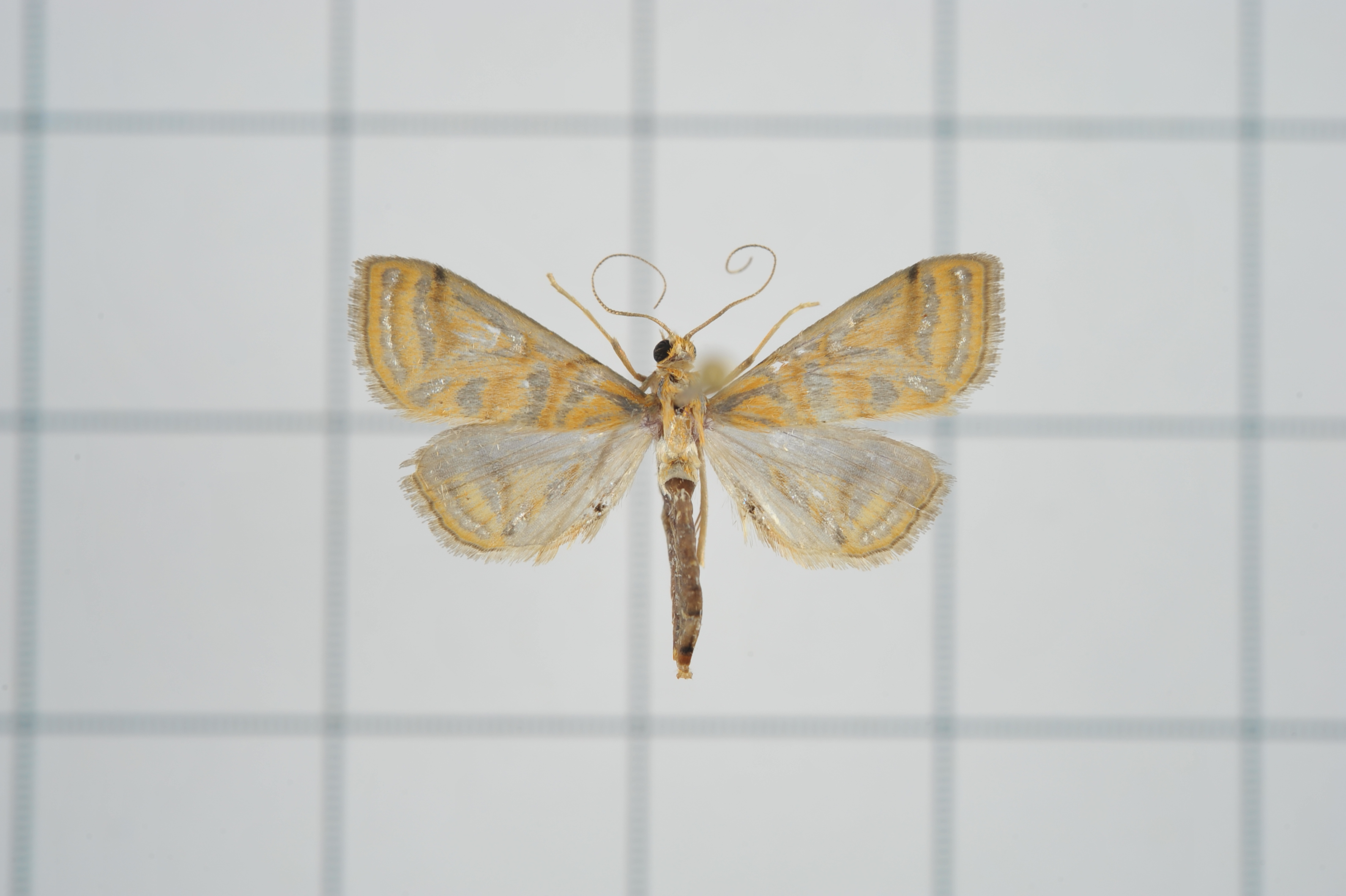

Scientific classification
- Domain: Eukaryota
- Kingdom: Animalia
- Phylum: Arthropoda
- Class: Insecta
- Order: Lepidoptera
- Family: Crambidae
- Genus: Daulia
- Species: D. afralis

Binomial name
- Daulia afralis Walker, 1859

= Daulia afralis =

Species of moth

Daulia afralis is a moth in the family Crambidae. It was described by Francis Walker in 1859. It is known from Borneo (type locality: Sarawak), Taiwan, Japan, Jeju Island (Korea), China, India, and Australia.

The wingspan is 17 mm (0.67 in) in males and 19 mm (0.75 in) in females.
