= Fissicrambus hemiochrellus =

Scientific classification
- Kingdom: Animalia
- Phylum: Arthropoda
- Clade: Pancrustacea
- Class: Insecta
- Order: Lepidoptera
- Family: Crambidae
- Genus: Fissicrambus
- Species: F. hemiochrellus

Binomial name
- Fissicrambus hemiochrellus (Zeller, 1877)

Synonyms
- Crambus hemiochrellus Zeller, 1877

Species of moth

Fissicrambus hemiochrellus is a moth in the family Crambidae. It was described by Zeller in 1877. It is found in North America, where it has been recorded from Alabama, Florida, Georgia, Mississippi and Oklahoma.

The wingspan is about 21 mm. Adults are on wing nearly year-round.
