= Daulia (moth) =

Scientific classification
- Kingdom: Animalia
- Phylum: Arthropoda
- Clade: Pancrustacea
- Class: Insecta
- Order: Lepidoptera
- Family: Crambidae
- Subfamily: Spilomelinae
- Genus: Daulia; Walker, 1859

Synonyms
- Girtexta Swinhoe, 1890

Genus of moths

Daulia is a genus of moths of the family Crambidae.

== Species ==
There are approximate nine recognized species:

- Daulia afralis Walker, 1859
- Daulia argentuosalis (Swinhoe, 1890)
- Daulia argyrophoralis Hampson, 1907
- Daulia argyrostrotalis Hampson, 1912
- Daulia arizonensis Munroe, 1957
- Daulia aurantialis Hampson, 1896
- Daulia auriplumbea (Warren, 1914)
- Daulia magdalena (Fernald, 1892)
- Daulia subaurealis (Walker, 1866)
