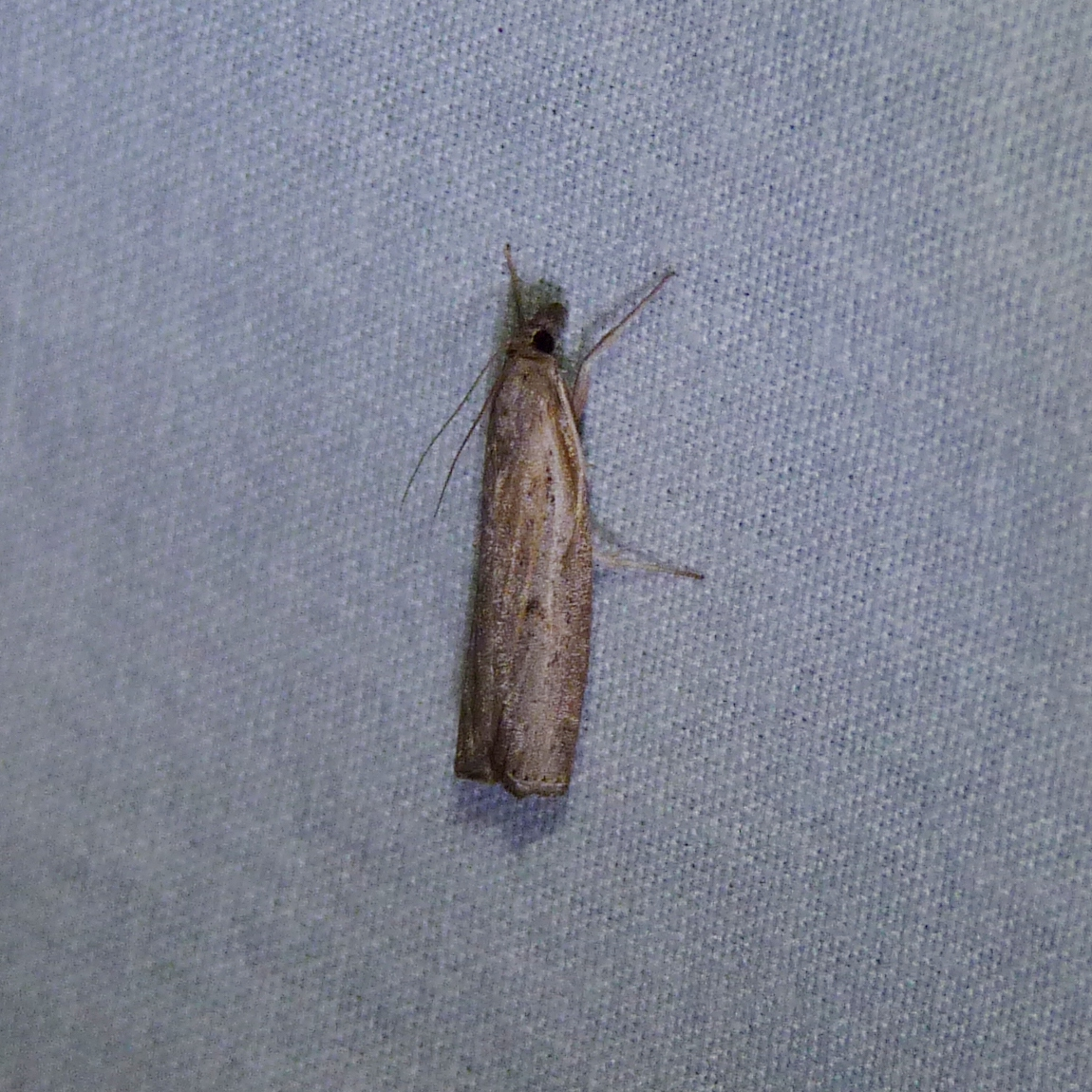

Scientific classification
- Kingdom: Animalia
- Phylum: Arthropoda
- Clade: Pancrustacea
- Class: Insecta
- Order: Lepidoptera
- Family: Crambidae
- Genus: Fissicrambus
- Species: F. mutabilis

Binomial name
- Fissicrambus mutabilis (Clemens, 1860)

Synonyms
- Crambus mutabilis Clemens, 1860; Crambus fuscicostellus Zeller, 1863

= Fissicrambus mutabilis =

Species of moth

Fissicrambus mutabilis, the changeable grass-veneer or striped sod webworm, is a moth of the family Crambidae. It is found from Quebec to Florida, west to Texas and Illinois and north to Ontario.

The wingspan is about 17 mm. Adults are on wing from June to August in two generations per year.

The larvae feed on various grasses. Partly grown larvae overwinter.
