= Charles H. Fernald =

American entomologist, geologist and zoologist

Charles Henry Fernald
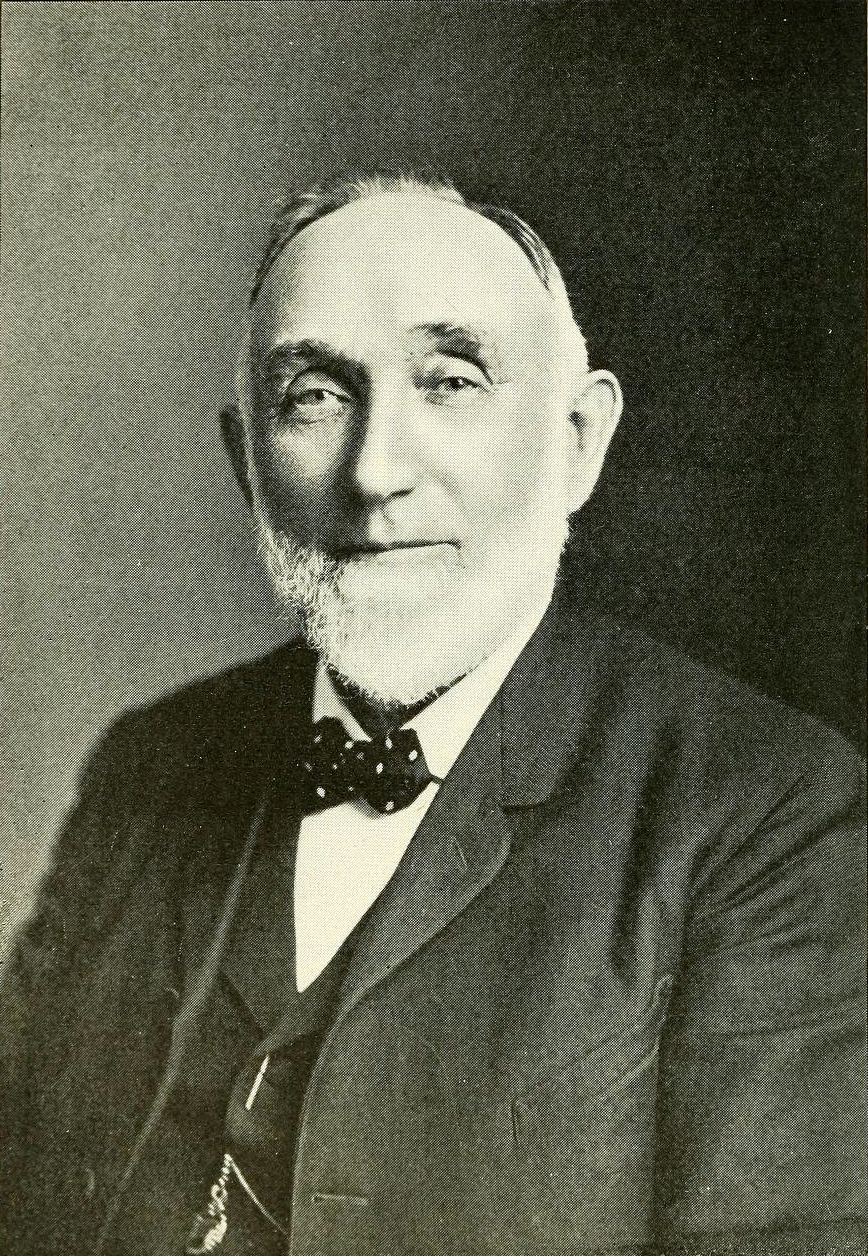
- Born: March 16, 1838; Mount Desert, Maine, U.S.
- Died: February 22, 1921 (aged 82); Amherst, Massachusetts, U.S.
- Education: Bowdoin College; University of Maine; Anderson School of Natural History
- Known for: Work on the eradication of the gypsy moth, first college-level teacher of economic entomology
- Spouse: Maria Elizabeth Fernald
- Scientific career
- Fields: Economic entomology, lepidopterology, geology, natural history
- Workplaces: University of Maine; University of Massachusetts Amherst
- Doctoral advisor: Louis Agassiz

Charles Henry Fernald (March 15, 1838 – February 22, 1921) was an American entomologist, geologist, and zoologist, who is credited as the first college professor of economic entomology. Fernald grew up at Fernald Point in Mount Desert, Maine, and went on to prepare for college at Maine Wesleyan Seminary before joining the navy in 1862. After receiving a master's degree from Bowdoin College he went on to serve as principal of several academies in Maine. Throughout his career he would document and describe several species of microlepidoptera and in 1886 became the first full-time professor and chair of the natural sciences at what is now the University of Massachusetts Amherst. Fernald Hall and the Fernald Entomological Society at the same institution, are named for him and his son, Henry Torsey Fernald, who would later hold the same position as his father. His wife, Maria Elizabeth Fernald, was a noted entomologist in her own right.

== Selected works ==
=== Textbooks ===
- The Butterflies of Maine (1884)
- The Grasses of Maine (1885)
- The Sphingidæ of New England (1886)
- The Orthoptera of New England (1888)
- The Crambidæ of North America (1896)
- The Gypsy Moth, coauthored with Edward H. Forbrush (1896)
- The Pterophoridæ of North America (1898)
- A List of North American Lepidoptera, contributor (1902)
- The Brown-tail Moth, coauthored with Archie H. Kirkland (1903)

=== Bulletins ===
- "The Grape-vine Leaf-hoppers", Bulletin No. 2, Hatch Experiment Station of the Massachusetts Agricultural College (1888)
- "Tuberculosis", Bulletin No. 3, Hatch Experiment Station of the Massachusetts Agricultural College (1889)
- "Household Pests", Bulletin No. 5, Hatch Experiment Station of the Massachusetts Agricultural College (1889)
- "Report on Insects", Bulletin No. 19, Hatch Experiment Station of the Massachusetts Agricultural College (1892)
- "Insecticides of the Horn Fly", Bulletin No. 24, Hatch Experiment Station of the Massachusetts Agricultural College (1894)
- "A New Pest in Massachusetts: The Brown Tail Moth", Special Bulletin, Hatch Experiment Station of the Massachusetts Agricultural College (1897)

=== Articles ===
- "Clothes Moths", published in The Canadian Entomologist, Vol. XIV, No. 9 (1882)
- "A Synonymical Catalogue of the Described Tortricidæ of North America", published in the Transactions of the American Entomological Society, Vol. X (1882)
- "The Evolution of Economic Entomology", a presidential address given before the American Association of Economic Entomologists, republished in Science, Vol. IV, No. 94 (1896)
