= A. barbieri =

A. barbieri may refer to:

- Abacetus barbieri, a ground beetle found in Vietnam
- Autocharis barbieri, a moth found in the Seychelles
