= Lipararchis =

Scientific classification
- Domain: Eukaryota
- Kingdom: Animalia
- Phylum: Arthropoda
- Class: Insecta
- Order: Lepidoptera
- Family: Crambidae
- Subfamily: Spilomelinae
- Genus: Lipararchis; Meyrick, 1934

Genus of moths

Lipararchis is a genus of moths of the family Crambidae.

== Species ==
- Lipararchis aspilus (Turner, 1915), described from Australia in the genus Calamochrous
- Lipararchis hyacinthopa Meyrick, 1934, the type species, described from Vunidawa on Fiji

== Former species ==
- Lipararchis tranquillalis (Lederer, 1863), now placed in the genus Bepea
