= Dicepolia roseobrunnea =

Scientific classification
- Kingdom: Animalia
- Phylum: Arthropoda
- Clade: Pancrustacea
- Class: Insecta
- Order: Lepidoptera
- Family: Crambidae
- Genus: Dicepolia
- Species: D. roseobrunnea

Binomial name
- Dicepolia roseobrunnea (Warren, 1889)

Synonyms
- Anemosa roseobrunnea Warren, 1889; Calamochrous roseobrunnea

Species of moth

Dicepolia roseobrunnea is a moth in the family Crambidae. Adults have forewing lengths of 7.2–10.3 mm (0.28–0.41 in) and forewing widths of 3.5–5.4 mm (0.14–0.21 in). It is highly variable in both size and coloration through its large range. It is native to much of South America, being found in Amazonia east of the Andes and north of Bolivia, all the way to the coastal Andes in Venezuela, in the Guianas, and in Trinidad. There is also a solitary Central American record from Honduras.

== Taxonomy ==
Dicepolia roseobrunnea was formally described in 1889 as Anemosa (?) roseobrunnea by the English entomologist William Warren based on an adult male specimen from the Jutaí River in Brazil. The species was occasionally placed in the genus Calamochrous during the late 19th century. The caterpillars of this moth had the Portuguese common name rosada da oiticica around 1940, when it was the cause of an infestation of Licania.

== Description ==
Adults of Dicepolia roseobrunnea have forewing lengths of 7.2–10.3 mm (0.28–0.41 in) and forewing widths of 3.5–5.4 mm (0.14–0.21 in). The forewings are pale brown to brownish-red and have highly variable patterns depending on the locality. Moths from Brazil are orange-brown centrally on the forewing while those from Venezuela and the Andes are brown. Moths from Guyana can have either color centrally. The ventral surface of the forewing is light brown, generally with no maculations. The hindwings are glossy white. The region near the apex has a brown wash between the veins. The ventral surface of the hindwing is brown near the tip.

== Distribution and habitat ==
Dicepolia roseobrunnea is widely distributed through South America. It is found in Amazonia and the Andes from Bolivia north through Peru and Brazil into the coastal Andes of Venezuela. It is further distributed in the Guianas, from Guyana through Suriname into French Guiana, and in Trinidad and Tobago. There is also a solitary record from Central America in Honduras. The moth is generally a species of moderately-high elevations, but can be found in lowlands.

Caterpillars of this moth feed on Licania species; they were an agricultural pest of Licania rigida in Brazil around 1940.
