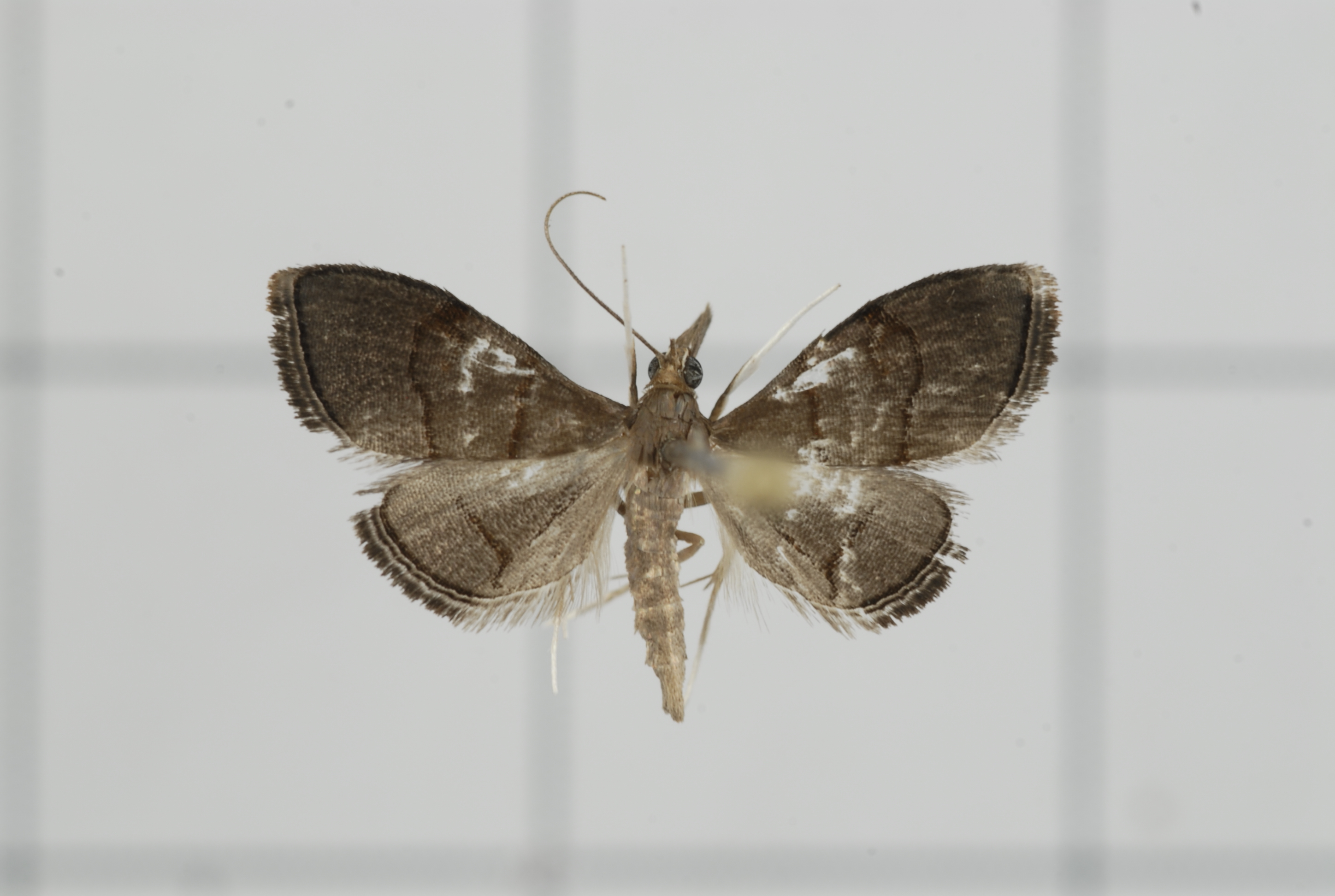

Scientific classification
- Kingdom: Animalia
- Phylum: Arthropoda
- Class: Insecta
- Order: Lepidoptera
- Family: Crambidae
- Subfamily: Odontiinae
- Genus: Clupeosoma; Snellen, 1880

= Clupeosoma =

Genus of moths

Clupeosoma is a genus of moths in the family Crambidae.

== Species ==
- Clupeosoma astrigalis Hampson, 1917
- Clupeosoma atristriata Hampson, 1917
- Clupeosoma cicatricale Munroe, 1977
- Clupeosoma cinerea (Warren, 1892)
- Clupeosoma glaucinalis Hampson, 1917
- Clupeosoma laniferalis Hampson, 1907
- Clupeosoma margarisemale Munroe, 1977
- Clupeosoma metachryson Hampson, 1897
- Clupeosoma microthyrale Munroe, 1977
- Clupeosoma orientalalis (Viette, 1954)
- Clupeosoma pellucidalis Snellen, 1880
- Clupeosoma rufistriata Hampson, 1917
- Clupeosoma sericialis (Hampson, 1896)

== Former species ==
- Clupeosoma purpureum Inoue, 1982
