= Autocharis marginata =

Scientific classification
- Domain: Eukaryota
- Kingdom: Animalia
- Phylum: Arthropoda
- Class: Insecta
- Order: Lepidoptera
- Family: Crambidae
- Genus: Autocharis
- Species: A. marginata

Binomial name
- Autocharis marginata Guillermet, 1996

Species of moth

Autocharis marginata is a species of moth of the family Crambidae described by Christian Guillermet in 1996. It is found on Réunion and Seychelles in the Indian Ocean, and in Mali.

It has a wingspan of 15 mm.

Visually this species looks very close to Autocharis hedyphaes.
