= Dicepolia artoides =

Scientific classification
- Kingdom: Animalia
- Phylum: Arthropoda
- Clade: Pancrustacea
- Class: Insecta
- Order: Lepidoptera
- Family: Crambidae
- Genus: Dicepolia
- Species: D. artoides

Binomial name
- Dicepolia artoides Hayden, 2009

Species of moth

Dicepolia artoides is a moth in the family Crambidae. It was described by the American entomologist James E. Hayden in 2009 and is named for its resemblance to the genus Arta. It is found on the eastern slopes of the Andes from Bolivia to Venezuela and has also been recorded from French Guiana. Adults have forewing lengths of 7.0–8.8 mm (0.28–0.35 in) and forewing widths of 3.5–4.6 mm (0.14–0.18 in). The forewings are brownish-red to brownish-violet and the hindwings are bronzy-washed white, irrotated with gray.

== Taxonomy ==
Dicepolia artoides was formally described in 2009 by the American entomologist James E. Hayden based on an adult male specimen from La Chorerra in Putumayo District, Peru. The species is named after the genus Arta, which it resembles in terms of having a generally vibrant reddish coloration and having a straight postmedial line.

== Description ==
Adults of Dicepolia artoides have forewing lengths of 7.0–8.8 mm (0.28–0.35 in) and forewing widths of 3.5–4.6 mm (0.14–0.18 in). The forewings are brownish-red to brownish-violet, although older specimens can have it fade to a dull brown-orange. There are dark reddish to brownish oblique bands across the wings in certain individuals and the costa are gray. The ventral surface of the forewing is bronze-brown. The hindwings are bronzy-washed white and irrotated with gray. The region near the apex has a pink suffusion, strongest on the veins.

== Distribution and habitat ==
Dicepolia artoides is widely distributed through South American. It is largely distributed on the eastern versant of the Andean mountains from Bolivia north through Peru and Ecuador into Venezuela, but is also found in French Guiana outside the Andes. It has been documented as an adult nearly year-round in different parts of its range.
