= Dicepolia marionalis =

Scientific classification
- Kingdom: Animalia
- Phylum: Arthropoda
- Class: Insecta
- Order: Lepidoptera
- Family: Crambidae
- Genus: Dicepolia
- Species: D. marionalis

Binomial name
- Dicepolia marionalis (Viette, 1958)

Synonyms
- Noorda marionalis Viette, 1958

Species of moth

Dicepolia marionalis is a species of moth of the family Crambidae. It is found in Madagascar.

The size stated in the original description is: A wingspan of 23 mm (0.91 in); length of the forewings: 22 mm (0.87 in).

Viette placed this moth in close relationship to: Autocharis carnosalis (Saalmüller, 1880).
