= Autocharis seyrigalis =

Scientific classification
- Kingdom: Animalia
- Phylum: Arthropoda
- Class: Insecta
- Order: Lepidoptera
- Family: Crambidae
- Genus: Autocharis
- Species: A. seyrigalis

Binomial name
- Autocharis seyrigalis (Marion & Viette, 1956)

Synonyms
- Noorda seyrigalis Marion & Viette, 1956

Species of moth

Autocharis seyrigalis is a moth in the family Crambidae. It is found in Madagascar.
