= Calamochrous homochroalis =

Scientific classification
- Domain: Eukaryota
- Kingdom: Animalia
- Phylum: Arthropoda
- Class: Insecta
- Order: Lepidoptera
- Family: Crambidae
- Genus: Calamochrous
- Species: C. homochroalis

Binomial name
- Calamochrous homochroalis C. Swinhoe, 1907

Species of moth

Calamochrous homochroalis is a moth in the family Crambidae. It was described by Charles Swinhoe in 1907. It is found on the Andamans in the Indian Ocean.
