= Calamochrous ferruginalis =

Scientific classification
- Kingdom: Animalia
- Phylum: Arthropoda
- Class: Insecta
- Order: Lepidoptera
- Family: Crambidae
- Genus: Calamochrous
- Species: C. ferruginalis

Binomial name
- Calamochrous ferruginalis Hampson, 1896

Species of moth

Calamochrous ferruginalis is a moth in the family Crambidae. It was described by George Hampson in 1896. It is found in India.
