= Calamochrous fulvitinctalis =

Scientific classification
- Kingdom: Animalia
- Phylum: Arthropoda
- Class: Insecta
- Order: Lepidoptera
- Family: Crambidae
- Genus: Calamochrous
- Species: C. fulvitinctalis

Binomial name
- Calamochrous fulvitinctalis Hampson, 1918

Species of moth

Calamochrous fulvitinctalis is a moth in the family Crambidae. It was described by George Hampson in 1918. It is found on the Admiralty Islands.
