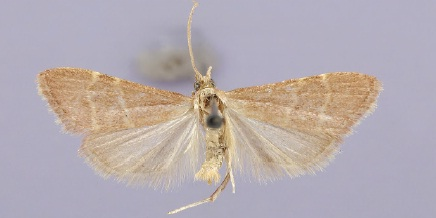

Scientific classification
- Kingdom: Animalia
- Phylum: Arthropoda
- Class: Insecta
- Order: Lepidoptera
- Family: Pyralidae
- Genus: Arta
- Species: A. brevivalvalis

Binomial name
- Arta brevivalvalis Cashatt in Solis, Cashatt & Scholtens, 2012

= Arta brevivalvalis =

Species of moth

Arta brevivalvalis is a species of moth of the family Pyralidae that is endemic to Arizona.

The forewings are reddish brown to purplish brown with ochreous antemedial and postmedial lines. The hindwings are greyish brown.
