= Dicepolia aerealis =

Scientific classification
- Kingdom: Animalia
- Phylum: Arthropoda
- Clade: Pancrustacea
- Class: Insecta
- Order: Lepidoptera
- Family: Crambidae
- Genus: Dicepolia
- Species: D. aerealis

Binomial name
- Dicepolia aerealis Hayden, 2009

Species of moth

Dicepolia aerealis is a moth in the family Crambidae. It was described by the American entomologist James E. Hayden in 2009 and is named for its bronze coloration. It is native to Costa Rica and Venezuela. Adults have forewing lengths of 6.6–8 mm (0.26–0.31 in) and forewing widths of 3.0–4.0 mm (0.12–0.16 in). The forewings are brown-orange to reddish-gold and have a smattering of dark scales. The hindwings are off white near the body and brass-colored towards the outer edge.

== Taxonomy ==
Dicepolia aerealis was formally described in 2009 by the American entomologist James E. Hayden based on an adult male specimen from Santa Rosa National Park in Guanacaste Province, Costa Rica. The specific epithet is derived from the Latin word meaning "bronze".

== Description ==
Adults of Dicepolia aerealis have forewing lengths of 6.6–8 mm (0.26–0.31 in) and forewing widths of 3.0–4.0 mm (0.12–0.16 in). The forewings are brown-orange to reddish-gold and have a smattering of dark scales. There are several poorly defined dark brownish oblique bands across the forewings and the costa has a dark brown band. The ventral surface of the forewing is brass-brown. The hindwings are off white near the body and brass-colored towards the outer edge. Ventrally, the hindwings are light yellow-white.

== Distribution and habitat ==
Dicepolia aerealis is native to Costa Rica and Venezuela. In Costa Rica, it is known from Guanacaste Province, while in Venezuela, it is known from the state of Barinas. The moth has been collected as an adult in February from Venezuela and from December to March from Costa Rica.
