= Autocharis egenula =

Scientific classification
- Domain: Eukaryota
- Kingdom: Animalia
- Phylum: Arthropoda
- Class: Insecta
- Order: Lepidoptera
- Family: Crambidae
- Genus: Autocharis
- Species: A. egenula

Binomial name
- Autocharis egenula E. Hering, 1901

Species of moth

Autocharis egenula is a moth in the family Crambidae. It was described by E. Hering in 1901. It is found on Sulawesi.
