= Clupeosoma laniferalis =

Scientific classification
- Kingdom: Animalia
- Phylum: Arthropoda
- Class: Insecta
- Order: Lepidoptera
- Family: Crambidae
- Genus: Clupeosoma
- Species: C. laniferalis

Binomial name
- Clupeosoma laniferalis Hampson, 1907

Species of moth

Clupeosoma laniferalis is a moth in the family Crambidae. It was described by George Hampson in 1907. It is found in Papua New Guinea, where it has been recorded from the Louisiade Archipelago.
