= Clupeosoma sericialis =

Scientific classification
- Kingdom: Animalia
- Phylum: Arthropoda
- Class: Insecta
- Order: Lepidoptera
- Family: Crambidae
- Genus: Clupeosoma
- Species: C. sericialis

Binomial name
- Clupeosoma sericialis (Hampson, 1896)

Synonyms
- Pleonectoides sericialis Hampson, 1896

Species of moth

Clupeosoma sericialis is a moth in the family Crambidae. It was described by George Hampson in 1896. It is found in Assam in India and Sumbawa in Indonesia.

The wingspan is about 16 mm. The forewings are pale silky purplish grey with a minutely waved indistinct submarginal line. There is a marginal series of dark specks.
