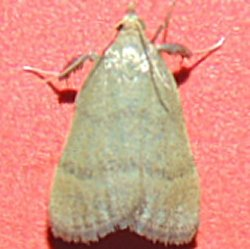

Scientific classification
- Kingdom: Animalia
- Phylum: Arthropoda
- Clade: Pancrustacea
- Class: Insecta
- Order: Lepidoptera
- Family: Pyralidae
- Genus: Arta
- Species: A. olivalis

Binomial name
- Arta olivalis Grote, 1878

= Arta olivalis =

Species of moth

Arta olivalis, the olive arta moth, is a species of snout moth in the genus Arta. It was described by Augustus Radcliffe Grote in 1878, and is known from the southern United States.

The wingspan is about 14 mm.
