= Clupeosoma glaucinalis =

Scientific classification
- Kingdom: Animalia
- Phylum: Arthropoda
- Class: Insecta
- Order: Lepidoptera
- Family: Crambidae
- Genus: Clupeosoma
- Species: C. glaucinalis

Binomial name
- Clupeosoma glaucinalis Hampson, 1917

Species of moth

Clupeosoma glaucinalis is a moth in the family Crambidae. It was described by George Hampson in 1917. It is found in Singapore and Indonesia, where it has been recorded from Sumbawa.

The wingspan is about 14 mm. The forewings are pale glaucous brown, faintly irrorated (sprinkled) with darker brown. The costa is darker brown. The postmedial line is white and defined by a minutely waved dark line on the outer side. The termen is ochreous with a series of blackish points. The hindwings are pale glaucous, irrorated with brown and with white costal and inner areas. There is a sinuous white postmedial line, defined on the outer side by a minutely waved dark line.
