= Hemiscopis suffusalis =

Scientific classification
- Kingdom: Animalia
- Phylum: Arthropoda
- Class: Insecta
- Order: Lepidoptera
- Family: Crambidae
- Genus: Hemiscopis
- Species: H. suffusalis

Binomial name
- Hemiscopis suffusalis (Walker, 1866)

Synonyms
- Scopula suffusalis Walker, 1866; Botys snellemanni Snellen, 1880; Hemiscopis suffusalis var. obscursalis Strand, 1918

Species of moth

Hemiscopis suffusalis is a moth in the family Crambidae. It was described by Francis Walker in 1866. It is found in Sri Lanka, Taiwan, Indonesia (Sumatra, Papua New Guinea), Australia and the Philippines.
