= Hemiscopis =

Scientific classification
- Domain: Eukaryota
- Kingdom: Animalia
- Phylum: Arthropoda
- Class: Insecta
- Order: Lepidoptera
- Family: Crambidae
- Subfamily: Odontiinae
- Genus: Hemiscopis; Warren, 1890

Genus of moths

Hemiscopis is a genus of moths of the family Crambidae.

== Species ==
- Hemiscopis expansa (Warren, 1892)
- Hemiscopis intermedialis (Munroe, 1977)
- Hemiscopis lophopedalis (de Joannis, 1927)
- Hemiscopis purpureum (Inoue, 1982)
- Hemiscopis sanguinea (Bänziger, 1987)
- Hemiscopis suffusalis (Walker, 1866)
- Hemiscopis violacea (T. P. Lucas, 1892)
