= Clupeosoma orientalalis =

Scientific classification
- Kingdom: Animalia
- Phylum: Arthropoda
- Class: Insecta
- Order: Lepidoptera
- Family: Crambidae
- Genus: Clupeosoma
- Species: C. orientalalis

Binomial name
- Clupeosoma orientalalis (Viette, 1958)

Synonyms
- Stenia orientalalis Viette, 1954; Noorda orientalalis

Species of moth

Clupeosoma orientalalis is a species of moth of the family Crambidae. It is found in Madagascar.

Viette placed this moth in a group with:

- Autocharis librodalis (Viette, 1958)
- Autocharis phortalis (Viette, 1958)
