= Hemiscopis lophopedalis =

Scientific classification
- Domain: Eukaryota
- Kingdom: Animalia
- Phylum: Arthropoda
- Class: Insecta
- Order: Lepidoptera
- Family: Crambidae
- Genus: Hemiscopis
- Species: H. lophopedalis

Binomial name
- Hemiscopis lophopedalis de Joannis, 1927

Synonyms
- Ptychopseustis lophopedalis; Prochoristis lophopedalis

Species of moth

Hemiscopis lophopedalis is a moth in the family Crambidae. It was described by Joseph de Joannis in 1927. It is found in Mozambique.
