= Autocharis putralis =

Scientific classification
- Kingdom: Animalia
- Phylum: Arthropoda
- Class: Insecta
- Order: Lepidoptera
- Family: Crambidae
- Genus: Autocharis
- Species: A. putralis

Binomial name
- Autocharis putralis (Viette, 1958)

Synonyms
- Noorda putralis Viette, 1958

Species of moth

Autocharis putralis is a species of moth of the family Crambidae described by Pierre Viette in 1958. It is found in Madagascar.

It has a wingspan of about 15 mm and the length of the forewings is 7 mm.
