= Dicepolia marginescriptalis =

Scientific classification
- Domain: Eukaryota
- Kingdom: Animalia
- Phylum: Arthropoda
- Class: Insecta
- Order: Lepidoptera
- Family: Crambidae
- Genus: Dicepolia
- Species: D. marginescriptalis

Binomial name
- Dicepolia marginescriptalis (Kenrick, 1917)

Synonyms
- Pyrausta marginescriptalis Kenrick, 1917

Species of moth

Dicepolia marginescriptalis is a moth in the family Crambidae. It was described by George Hamilton Kenrick in 1917. It is found on Madagascar.
