= Calamochrous carnealis =

Scientific classification
- Domain: Eukaryota
- Kingdom: Animalia
- Phylum: Arthropoda
- Class: Insecta
- Order: Lepidoptera
- Family: Crambidae
- Genus: Calamochrous
- Species: C. carnealis

Binomial name
- Calamochrous carnealis (C. Swinhoe, 1895)

Synonyms
- Notaspis carnealis C. Swinhoe, 1895

Species of moth

Calamochrous carnealis is a moth in the family Crambidae. It was described by Charles Swinhoe in 1895. It is found in India.
