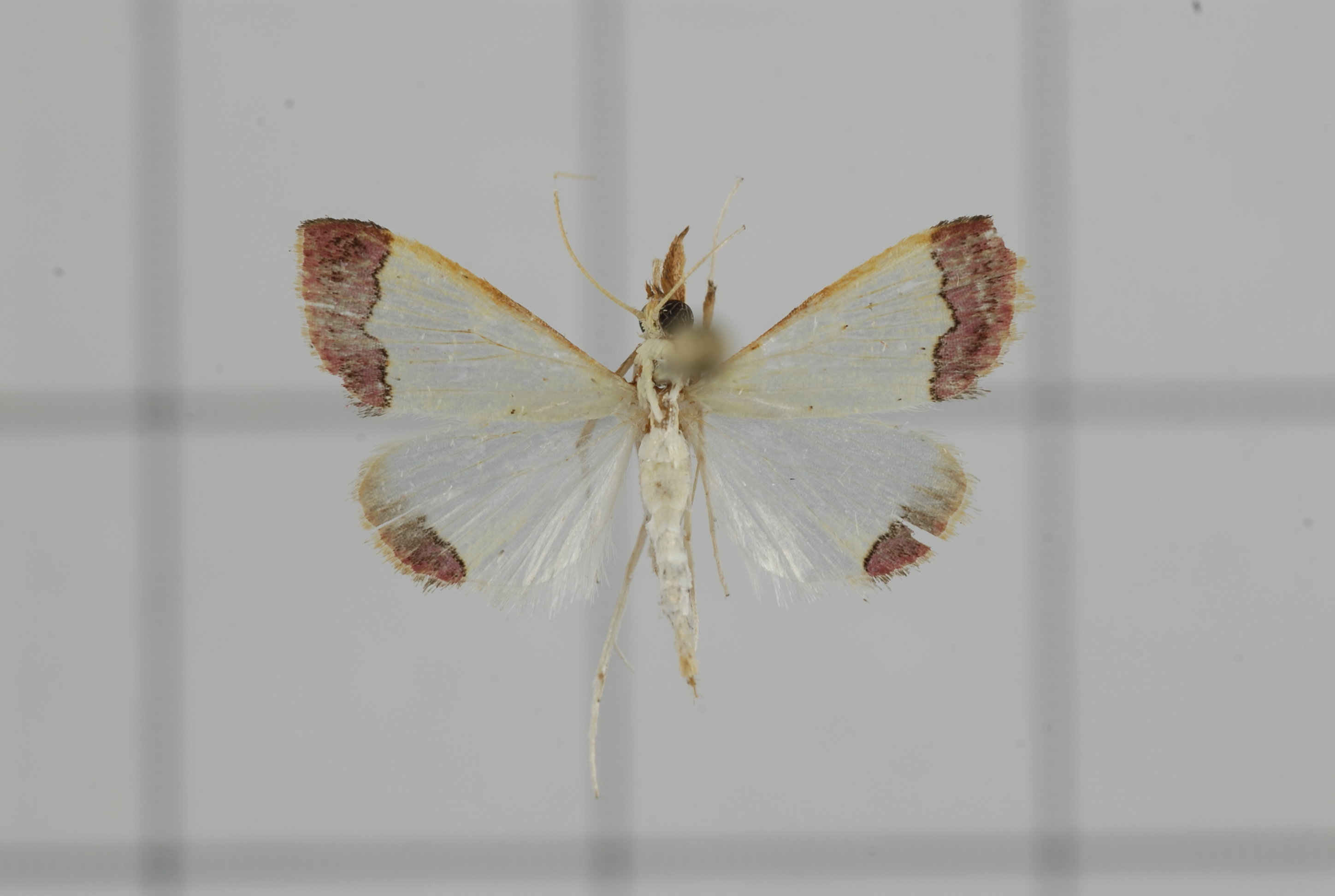

Scientific classification
- Domain: Eukaryota
- Kingdom: Animalia
- Phylum: Arthropoda
- Class: Insecta
- Order: Lepidoptera
- Family: Crambidae
- Genus: Autocharis
- Species: A. fessalis

Binomial name
- Autocharis fessalis (C. Swinhoe, 1886)

Synonyms
- Glyphodes fessalis C. Swinhoe, 1886; Autocharis amethystina C. Swinhoe, 1894

= Autocharis fessalis =

Species of moth

Autocharis fessalis is a moth in the family Crambidae. It was described by Charles Swinhoe in 1886. It is found in the Democratic Republic of the Congo, on the Seychelles and in South Africa, the United Arab Emirates, Yemen, Bhutan, India and Pakistan.
