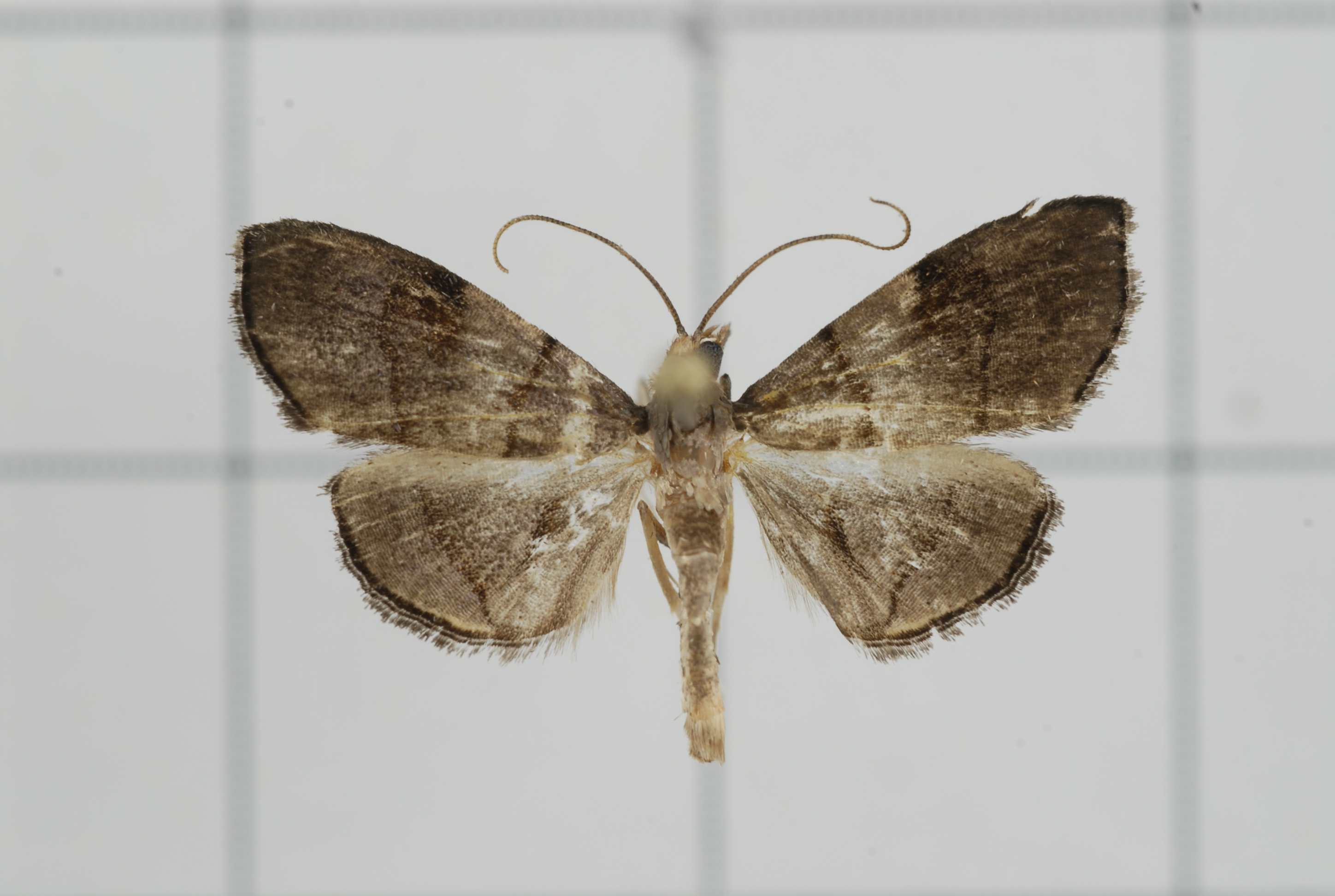

Scientific classification
- Kingdom: Animalia
- Phylum: Arthropoda
- Clade: Pancrustacea
- Class: Insecta
- Order: Lepidoptera
- Family: Crambidae
- Genus: Clupeosoma
- Species: C. cinerea

Binomial name
- Clupeosoma cinerea (Warren, 1892)

Synonyms
- Hemiscopis cinerea Warren, 1892; Clupeosoma cinereum

= Clupeosoma cinerea =

Species of moth

Clupeosoma cinerea is a moth in the family Crambidae. It was described by William Warren in 1892. It is found in Japan (Hokkaido, Honshu, Shikoku, Kyushu, Tsushima, Yakushima), Borneo, China, Russia and Taiwan.

The wingspan is 21–26 mm. The wings are fuscous cinereous (ash gray) with a slight purplish gloss. The transverse lines are dark brown.
