= Hemiscopis intermedialis =

Scientific classification
- Domain: Eukaryota
- Kingdom: Animalia
- Phylum: Arthropoda
- Class: Insecta
- Order: Lepidoptera
- Family: Crambidae
- Genus: Hemiscopis
- Species: H. intermedialis

Binomial name
- Hemiscopis intermedialis Munroe, 1977

Species of moth

Hemiscopis intermedialis is a moth in the family Crambidae. It was described by Eugene G. Munroe in 1977. It is found in Indonesia, where it has been recorded from Sumba.
