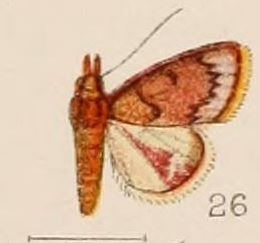

Scientific classification
- Kingdom: Animalia
- Phylum: Arthropoda
- Class: Insecta
- Order: Lepidoptera
- Family: Crambidae
- Genus: Calamochrous
- Species: C. purpuralis

Binomial name
- Calamochrous purpuralis Hampson, 1908

= Calamochrous purpuralis =

Species of moth

Calamochrous purpuralis is a moth in the family Crambidae that is found in Sri Lanka. It was described by George Hampson in 1908.

It has a wingspan of 22 mm.
