= Autocharis discalis =

Scientific classification
- Domain: Eukaryota
- Kingdom: Animalia
- Phylum: Arthropoda
- Class: Insecta
- Order: Lepidoptera
- Family: Crambidae
- Genus: Autocharis
- Species: A. discalis

Binomial name
- Autocharis discalis J. C. Shaffer & Munroe, 2007

Species of moth

Autocharis discalis is a moth in the family Crambidae. It was described by Jay C. Shaffer and Eugene G. Munroe in 2007. It is found on the Seychelles, where it has been recorded from Aldabra.
