= Clupeosoma astrigalis =

Scientific classification
- Kingdom: Animalia
- Phylum: Arthropoda
- Class: Insecta
- Order: Lepidoptera
- Family: Crambidae
- Genus: Clupeosoma
- Species: C. astrigalis

Binomial name
- Clupeosoma astrigalis Hampson, 1917

Species of moth

Clupeosoma astrigalis is a moth in the family Crambidae. It was described by George Hampson in 1917. It is found in Australia, where it has been recorded from Queensland.

The wingspan is about 16 mm. The forewings are pale rufous with an opalescent blue gloss up to the postmedial line. The terminal area is purplish rufous. The postmedial line is yellowish white, defined on the outer side by a slightly waved brown line. The costa beyond it is dark brown. The hindwings are pale rufous, with an opalescent black gloss. The costal and inner areas are whitish with an oblique yellowish-white postmedial band, defined on the outer side by a slightly waved brown line. The terminal area is purplish rufous, with a series of red-brown bars on the termen.
