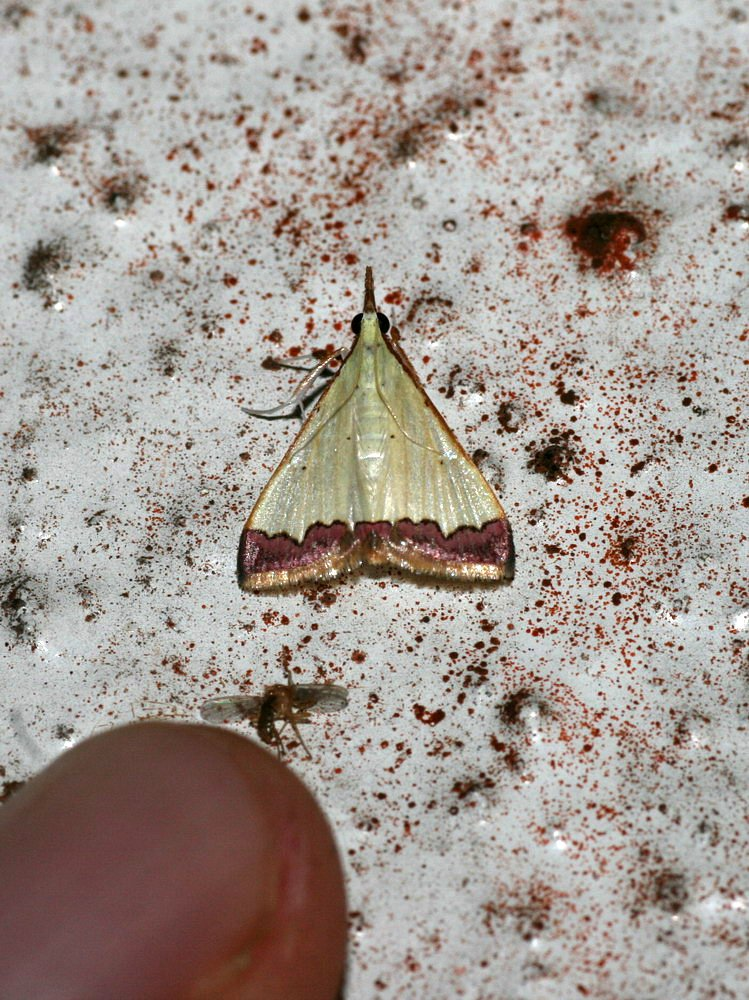
- Autocharis hedyphaes

Scientific classification
- Domain: Eukaryota
- Kingdom: Animalia
- Phylum: Arthropoda
- Class: Insecta
- Order: Lepidoptera
- Family: Crambidae
- Subfamily: Odontiinae
- Genus: Autocharis; Swinhoe, 1894

= Autocharis =

Genus of moths

Autocharis is a genus of moths of the family Crambidae.

== Species ==
- Autocharis albiplaga (Hampson, 1913)
- Autocharis arida Mey, 2011
- Autocharis arrondalis Seizmair, 2020
- Autocharis barbieri (Legrand, 1966)
- Autocharis bekilalis (Marion & Viette, 1956)
- Autocharis carnosalis (Saalmüller, 1880)
- Autocharis discalis J. C. Shaffer & Munroe, 2007
- Autocharis ecthaemata (Hampson, 1913)
- Autocharis egenula E. Hering, 1901
- Autocharis fessalis (Swinhoe, 1886)
- Autocharis hedyphaes (Turner, 1913)
- Autocharis jacobsalis (Marion & Viette, 1956)
- Autocharis librodalis (Viette, 1958)
- Autocharis linealis J. C. Shaffer & Munroe, 2007
- Autocharis marginata Guillermet in Viette & Guillermet, 1996
- Autocharis miltosoma (Turner, 1937)
- Autocharis mimetica (Lower, 1903)
- Autocharis phortalis (Viette, 1958)
- Autocharis putralis (Viette, 1958)
- Autocharis renalis Seizmair, 2020
- Autocharis sarobialis Amsel, 1970
- Autocharis seyrigalis (Marion & Viette, 1956)
- Autocharis sinualis (Hampson, 1899)
- Autocharis vohilavalis (Marion & Viette, 1956)

== Former species ==
- Autocharis catalalis (Viette, 1953), now placed in Mabilleodes
