= Autocharis albiplaga =

Scientific classification
- Kingdom: Animalia
- Phylum: Arthropoda
- Class: Insecta
- Order: Lepidoptera
- Family: Crambidae
- Genus: Autocharis
- Species: A. albiplaga

Binomial name
- Autocharis albiplaga (Hampson, 1913)

Synonyms
- Noorda albiplaga Hampson, 1913

Species of moth

Autocharis albiplaga is a moth in the family Crambidae. It was described by George Hampson in 1913. It is found in South Africa.
