= Autocharis arida =

Scientific classification
- Kingdom: Animalia
- Phylum: Arthropoda
- Clade: Pancrustacea
- Class: Insecta
- Order: Lepidoptera
- Family: Crambidae
- Genus: Autocharis
- Species: A. arida

Binomial name
- Autocharis arida Mey, 2011

Species of moth

Autocharis arida is a moth in the family Crambidae. It was described by Wolfram Mey in 2011. It is found in South Africa and Namibia.
