= Autocharis librodalis =

Scientific classification
- Kingdom: Animalia
- Phylum: Arthropoda
- Class: Insecta
- Order: Lepidoptera
- Family: Crambidae
- Genus: Autocharis
- Species: A. librodalis

Binomial name
- Autocharis librodalis (Viette, 1958)

Synonyms
- Noorda librodalis Viette, 1958

Species of moth

Autocharis librodalis is a species of moth of the family Crambidae described by Pierre Viette in 1958. It is found in Madagascar.

It has a wingspan of about 15 mm and the length of the forewings is 7 mm.

Viette placed this moth in a group with:

- Autocharis phortalis (Viette, 1958)
- Clupeosoma orientalalis (Viette, 1954)
