= Dicepolia rufeolalis =

Scientific classification
- Domain: Eukaryota
- Kingdom: Animalia
- Phylum: Arthropoda
- Class: Insecta
- Order: Lepidoptera
- Family: Crambidae
- Genus: Dicepolia
- Species: D. rufeolalis

Binomial name
- Dicepolia rufeolalis (Mabille, 1900)

Synonyms
- Pionea rufeolalis Mabille, 1900

Species of moth

Dicepolia rufeolalis is a moth in the family Crambidae. It was described by Paul Mabille in 1900. It is found on Madagascar.
