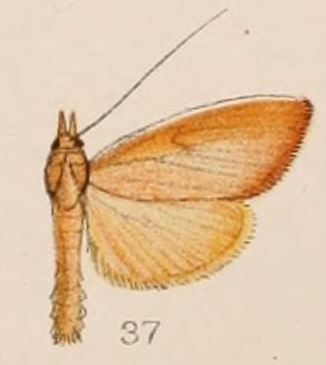

Scientific classification
- Kingdom: Animalia
- Phylum: Arthropoda
- Class: Insecta
- Order: Lepidoptera
- Family: Crambidae
- Genus: Calamochrous
- Species: C. sarcalis

Binomial name
- Calamochrous sarcalis Hampson, 1908

= Calamochrous sarcalis =

Species of moth

Calamochrous sarcalis is a moth in the family Crambidae that is found in Sri Lanka. It was described by George Hampson in 1908.

It has a wingspan of 34 mm.
