= Clupeosoma rufistriata =

Scientific classification
- Kingdom: Animalia
- Phylum: Arthropoda
- Class: Insecta
- Order: Lepidoptera
- Family: Crambidae
- Genus: Clupeosoma
- Species: C. rufistriata

Binomial name
- Clupeosoma rufistriata Hampson, 1917

Species of moth

Clupeosoma rufistriata is a moth in the family Crambidae. It was described by George Hampson in 1917. It is found in New Guinea.

The wingspan is about 18 mm. The forewings are glaucous, tinged with rufous and irrorated (sprinkled) with red brown. The costa is rufous to the end of the cell, then darker brown with the streaks below it rufous. The postmedial line is white with some blackish scales before it and defined on the outer side by a red-brown line. The area beyond it is pale rufous, the termen is tinged with purple with a dark red-brown line on it towards the apex, then a series of white striae. The hindwings are pale glaucous, tinged with brown, the costal and inner areas whitish. There is an oblique yellowish-white postmedial band, defined on the outer side by a slightly waved purplish-red line. The terminal area is pale purple and the termen is white with a series of rufous points.
