= Hemiscopis expansa =

Scientific classification
- Kingdom: Animalia
- Phylum: Arthropoda
- Class: Insecta
- Order: Lepidoptera
- Family: Crambidae
- Genus: Hemiscopis
- Species: H. expansa

Binomial name
- Hemiscopis expansa Warren, 1892

Species of moth

Hemiscopis expansa is a moth in the family Crambidae. It was described by William Warren in 1892. It is found in India.

The wingspan is about 30 mm. The forewings are glossy violet fuscous, with an ochreous tinge towards the hind margin. The first line is slightly rust coloured and the second line is dark brown. The costal fourth of the hindwings is clear pale ochreous, while the rest of the wing is pinkish fuscous.
