= Arta calidalis =

Scientific classification
- Kingdom: Animalia
- Phylum: Arthropoda
- Class: Insecta
- Order: Lepidoptera
- Family: Pyralidae
- Genus: Arta
- Species: A. calidalis

Binomial name
- Arta calidalis Hampson, 1906

Species of moth

Arta calidalis is a species of snout moth in the genus Arta. It was described by George Hampson in 1906, and is known from Guatemala and Paraguay.
