= Autocharis mimetica =

Scientific classification
- Domain: Eukaryota
- Kingdom: Animalia
- Phylum: Arthropoda
- Class: Insecta
- Order: Lepidoptera
- Family: Crambidae
- Genus: Autocharis
- Species: A. mimetica

Binomial name
- Autocharis mimetica (Lower, 1903)

Synonyms
- Clupeosoma mimetica Lower, 1903

Species of moth

Autocharis mimetica is a moth in the family Crambidae. It is found in Australia, where it has been recorded from Western Australia, the Northern Territory and Queensland.
