= Calamochrous minimalis =

Scientific classification
- Domain: Eukaryota
- Kingdom: Animalia
- Phylum: Arthropoda
- Class: Insecta
- Order: Lepidoptera
- Family: Crambidae
- Genus: Calamochrous
- Species: C. minimalis

Binomial name
- Calamochrous minimalis Caradja, 1931

Species of moth

Calamochrous minimalis is a moth in the family Crambidae. It was described by Aristide Caradja in 1931. It is found in China.
