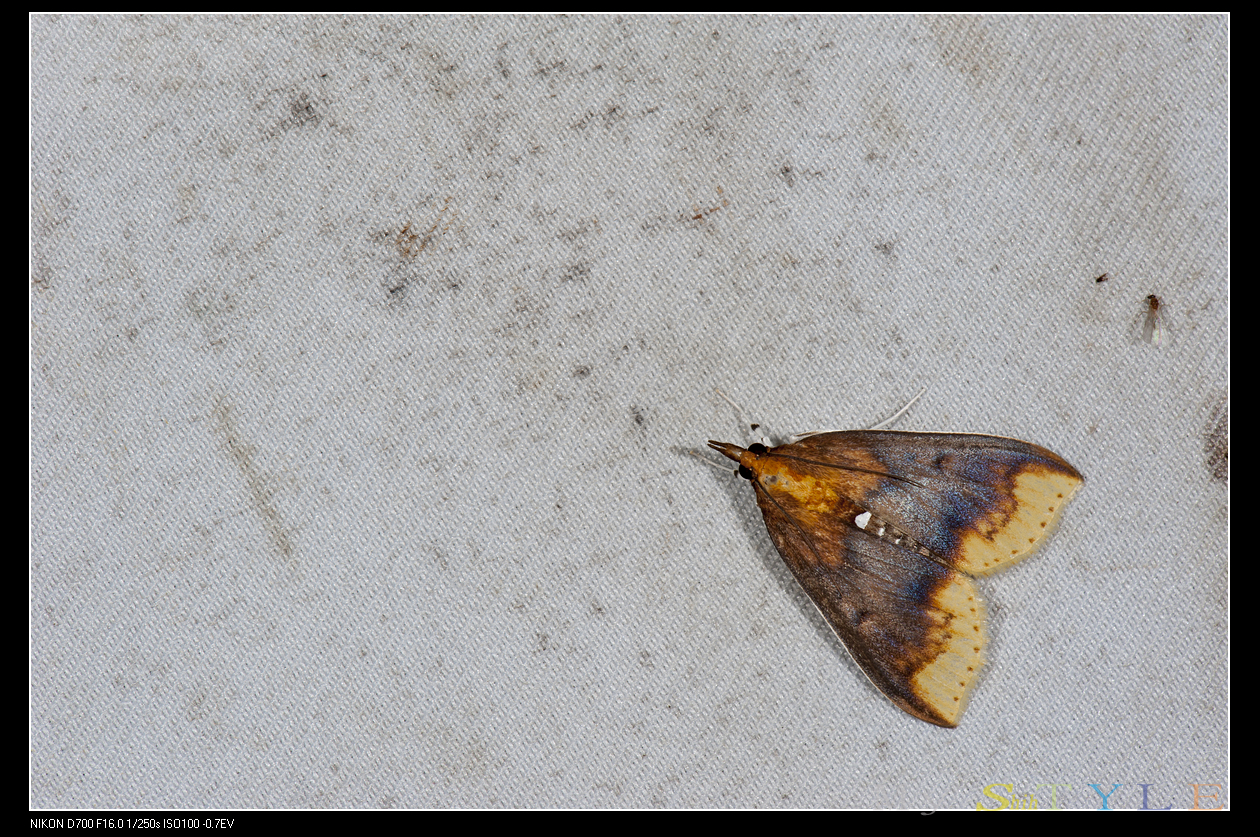
- Bepea tranquillalis

Scientific classification
- Domain: Eukaryota
- Kingdom: Animalia
- Phylum: Arthropoda
- Class: Insecta
- Order: Lepidoptera
- Family: Crambidae
- Genus: Bepea; Koçak & Kemal, 2007

Species
- Bepea tranquillalis; Bepea pyraustalis

Synonyms
- Notaspis Warren, 1892; Notesia Yamanaka, 1992

= Bepea =

Genus of moths

Bepea is a moth genus in the subfamily Spilomelinae of the family Crambidae.

The name Bepea is a replacement name, or nomen novum, proposed by Koçak & Kemal in 2007. The new name was necessary because the previous genus name, Notesia Yamanaka, 1992, was a junior homonym of Notesia Casey, 1922, a genus of weevils. Notesia Yamanaka, 1992, however, was also a replacement name, as the original name of the genus, Notaspis Warren, 1892, was a junior homonym of the mite genus Notaspis Hermann, 1804.

The genus currently comprises two species: the type species, Bepea tranquillalis, was described by Julius Lederer in 1863. It is found in Indonesia, Papua New Guinea and Taiwan. A second species, Bepea pyraustalis, was transferred to the genus by Koçak & Kemal (2007). It was described by Embrik Strand in 1918 in the genus Calamochrous based on specimens collected in Kankau and Kosempo on Taiwan.
