= Dicepolia venezolalis =

Scientific classification
- Kingdom: Animalia
- Phylum: Arthropoda
- Clade: Pancrustacea
- Class: Insecta
- Order: Lepidoptera
- Family: Crambidae
- Genus: Dicepolia
- Species: D. venezolalis

Binomial name
- Dicepolia venezolalis Hayden, 2009

Species of moth

Dicepolia venezolalis is a moth in the family Crambidae. It was described by the American entomologist James E. Hayden in 2009 and is named for the country in which it occurs. It is native to Venezuela and French Guiana. Adults have forewing lengths of 6.3–6.9 mm (0.25–0.27 in) and forewing widths of 3.2–3.8 mm (0.13–0.15 in). The forewings are grayish yellow-brown irrotated with darker brown. The hindwings are off-white and slightly hyaline.

== Taxonomy ==
Dicepolia venezolalis was formally described in 2009 by the American entomologist James E. Hayden based on an adult male specimen from the state of Amazonas in Venezuela. The species is named after the country in which it occurs.

== Description ==
Adults of Dicepolia venezolalis have forewing lengths of 6.3–6.9 mm (0.25–0.27 in) and forewing widths of 3.2–3.8 mm (0.13–0.15 in). These moths are usually grayish-yellow to orange-brown in coloration. The forewings are grayish yellow-brown irrotated with darker brown. There are well-defined brown oblique bands across the wings and concolorous costa. The ventral surface of the forewing is iridescent brown. The hindwings are off-white and slightly hyaline. The region near the apex is light brown and grades into the otherwise white wing. The ventral surface of the hindwing is pale gray to yellow-white.

== Distribution and habitat ==
Dicepolia venezolalis is native to Venezuela and French Guiana. It is known from Amazonas in Venezuela and from Pied Saut along the Oyapock River in French Guiana. Venezuelan adults were collected in November while Guianan ones are from December.
