= Autocharis sarobialis =

Scientific classification
- Kingdom: Animalia
- Phylum: Arthropoda
- Class: Insecta
- Order: Lepidoptera
- Family: Crambidae
- Genus: Autocharis
- Species: A. sarobialis

Binomial name
- Autocharis sarobialis Amsel, 1970

Species of moth

Autocharis sarobialis is a nocturnal moth in the family Crambidae, also known as Crambid snout moths. It is found in Afghanistan.
