= Dicepolia munroealis =

Scientific classification
- Kingdom: Animalia
- Phylum: Arthropoda
- Class: Insecta
- Order: Lepidoptera
- Family: Crambidae
- Genus: Dicepolia
- Species: D. munroealis

Binomial name
- Dicepolia munroealis (Viette, 1960)

Synonyms
- Noorda munroealis Viette, 1960

Species of moth

Dicepolia munroealis is a moth in the family Crambidae. It was described by Viette in 1960. It is found in Madagascar.
