= Clupeosoma cicatricale =

Scientific classification
- Domain: Eukaryota
- Kingdom: Animalia
- Phylum: Arthropoda
- Class: Insecta
- Order: Lepidoptera
- Family: Crambidae
- Genus: Clupeosoma
- Species: C. cicatricale

Binomial name
- Clupeosoma cicatricale Munroe, 1977

Species of moth

Clupeosoma cicatricale is a moth in the family Crambidae. It was described by Eugene G. Munroe in 1977. It lives on Sumatra.
