= Clupeosoma atristriata =

Scientific classification
- Kingdom: Animalia
- Phylum: Arthropoda
- Class: Insecta
- Order: Lepidoptera
- Family: Crambidae
- Genus: Clupeosoma
- Species: C. atristriata

Binomial name
- Clupeosoma atristriata Hampson, 1917

Species of moth

Clupeosoma atristriata is a moth in the family Crambidae. It was described by George Hampson in 1917. It is found in Papua New Guinea, including the Bismarck Archipelago and Indonesia, where it has been recorded from Timur.

The wingspan is about 20 mm. The forewings are pale glaucous with an opalescent blue gloss. The costa is rufous to the middle and then dark brown with black streaks below it. The postmedial line is brown, then yellowish white and defined on the outer side by a purplish-red line. The postmedial area is yellowish suffused with rufous. The terminal area is purple with a terminal series of minute dark brown spots defined by whitish. The hindwings are pale glaucous with an opalescent blue gloss. The costal and inner areas are whitish with an oblique white postmedial band, near the termen defined on the outer side by a slightly waved red line. The terminal area is purple, with a terminal series of minute purple-brown spots defined by white.
