= Clupeosoma pellucidalis =

Scientific classification
- Kingdom: Animalia
- Phylum: Arthropoda
- Class: Insecta
- Order: Lepidoptera
- Family: Crambidae
- Genus: Clupeosoma
- Species: C. pellucidalis

Binomial name
- Clupeosoma pellucidalis Snellen, 1880

Synonyms
- Noorda subrufalis Rothschild, 1915

Species of moth

Clupeosoma pellucidalis is a moth in the family Crambidae. It was described by Snellen in 1880. It is found in Indonesia, where it has been recorded from Sulawesi and Seram, as well as Australia, where it is found in the Northern Territory.

The wingspan is about 18 mm. The forewings are pale mouse-grey in the basal three-fifths. The outer three-fifths of the costal area and below it are sooty black brown. A double black and white band borders the mouse-grey area and there is a brick-red patch near the inner margin. There is also a double zig-zag line which is yellow on the inside and brick-red on the outside, as well as a bright mauve subterminal band and a terminal line of alternating buff and rufous spots. The hindwings are buff and pale mouse-grey with a buffy yellow line and a large brick-red patch. The subterminal band is mauve and the terminal line consists of alternating buff and rufous spots.
