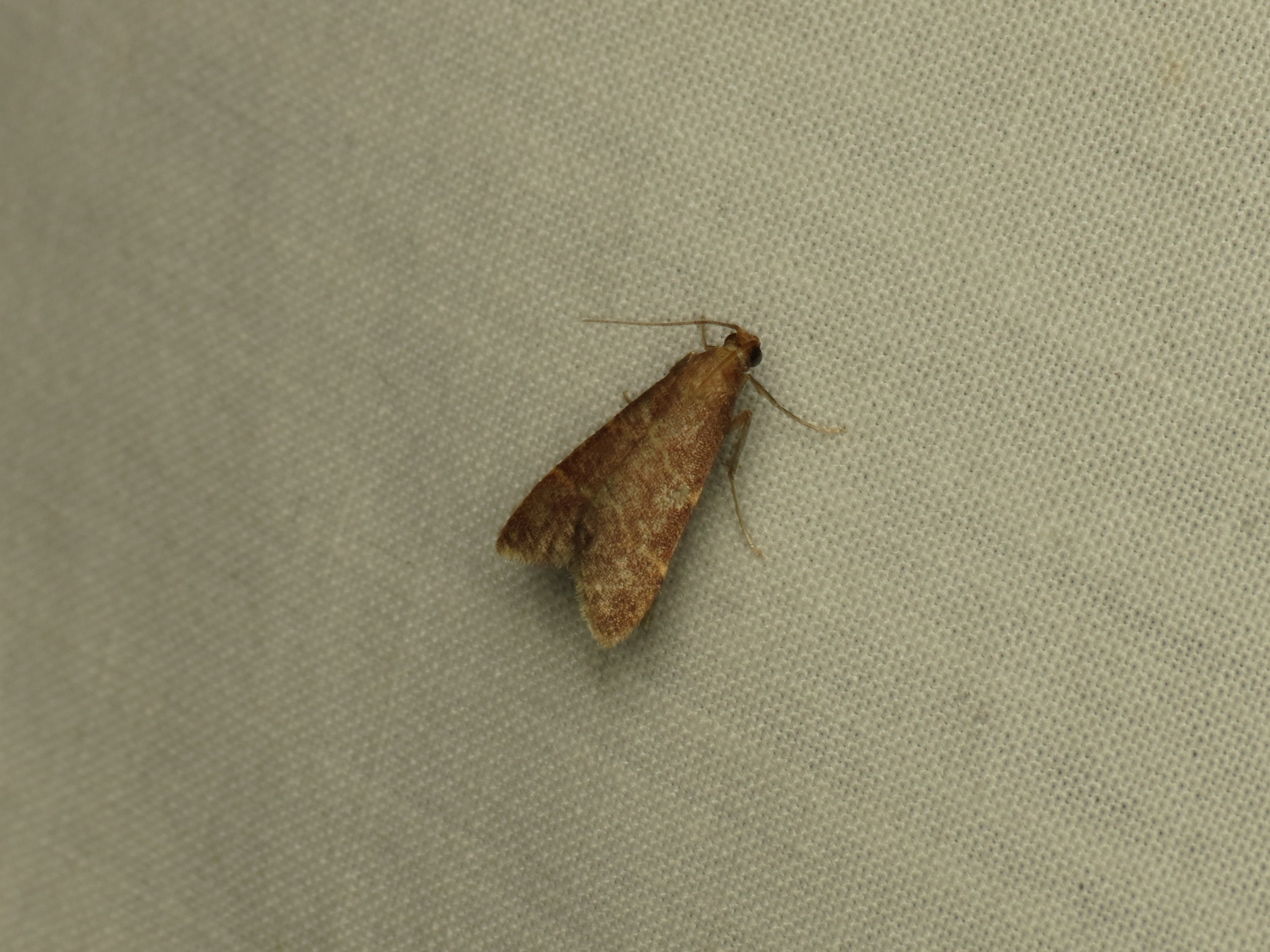

Scientific classification
- Kingdom: Animalia
- Phylum: Arthropoda
- Clade: Pancrustacea
- Class: Insecta
- Order: Lepidoptera
- Family: Pyralidae
- Genus: Arta
- Species: A. epicoenalis

Binomial name
- Arta epicoenalis Ragonot, 1891

Synonyms
- Xantippe descansalis Dyar, 1908; Xantippe beatifica Dyar, 1921

= Arta epicoenalis =

Species of moth

Arta epicoenalis is a species of snout moth in the genus Arta. It was described by Ragonot, in 1891, and is known from the United States, where it is found from California to Texas and Oklahoma.

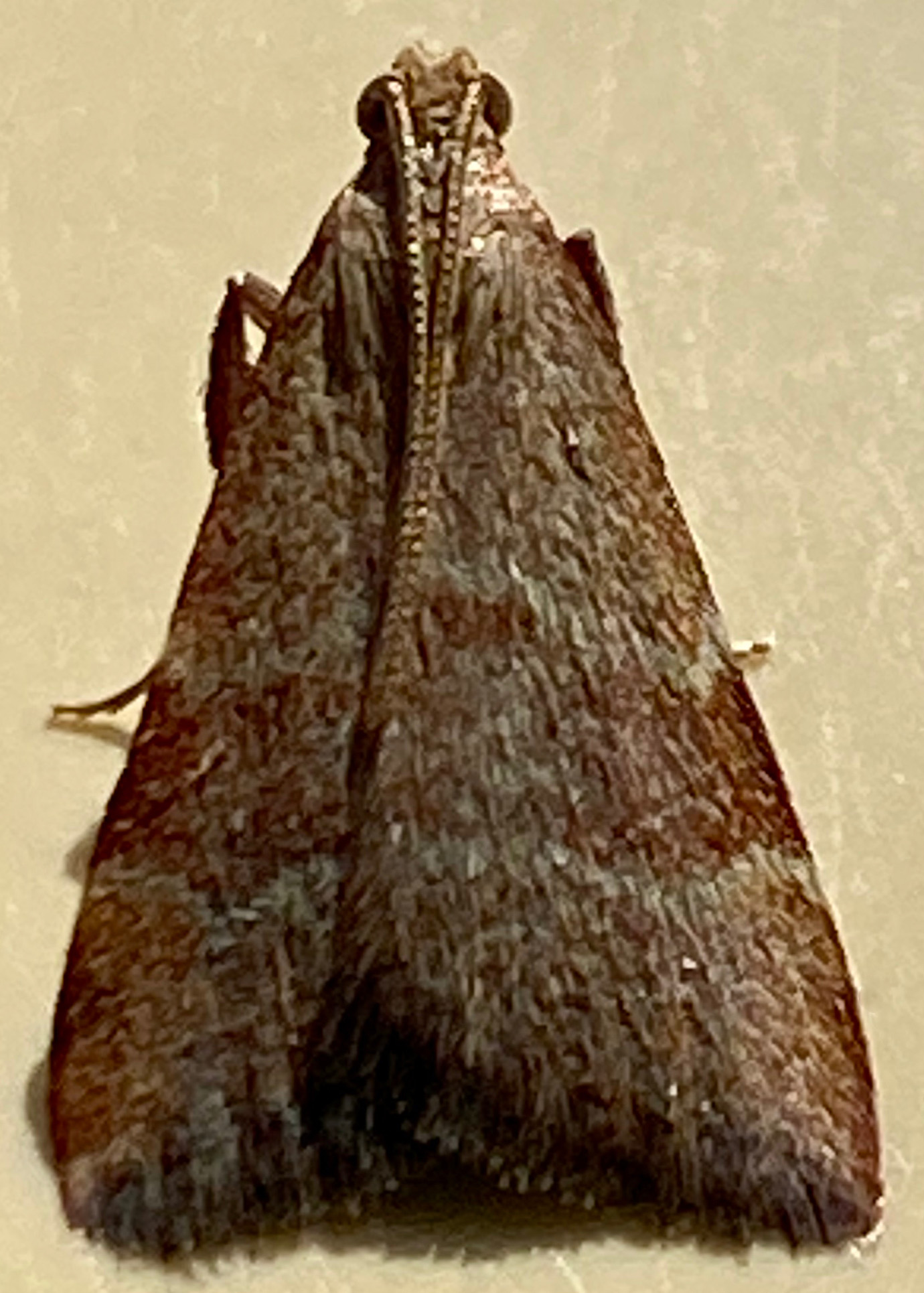
Arta epicoenalis. Oregon
