= Autocharis miltosoma =

Scientific classification
- Domain: Eukaryota
- Kingdom: Animalia
- Phylum: Arthropoda
- Class: Insecta
- Order: Lepidoptera
- Family: Crambidae
- Genus: Autocharis
- Species: A. miltosoma

Binomial name
- Autocharis miltosoma (Turner, 1937)

Synonyms
- Noorda miltosoma Turner, 1937

Species of moth

Autocharis miltosoma is a moth in the family Crambidae. It is found in Australia, where it has been recorded in Queensland.
