= Arta encaustalis =

Scientific classification
- Domain: Eukaryota
- Kingdom: Animalia
- Phylum: Arthropoda
- Class: Insecta
- Order: Lepidoptera
- Family: Pyralidae
- Genus: Arta
- Species: A. encaustalis

Binomial name
- Arta encaustalis Ragonot, 1891

Species of moth

Arta encaustalis is a species of snout moth in the genus Arta. It was described by Émile Louis Ragonot in 1891, and is known from Brazil.
