= Dicepolia vaga =

Scientific classification
- Kingdom: Animalia
- Phylum: Arthropoda
- Clade: Pancrustacea
- Class: Insecta
- Order: Lepidoptera
- Family: Crambidae
- Genus: Dicepolia
- Species: D. vaga

Binomial name
- Dicepolia vaga Hayden, 2009

Species of moth

Dicepolia vaga is a moth in the family Crambidae. It was described by the American entomologist James E. Hayden in 2009 and is named after its disjunct range. It is known from the Andes of Ecuador, Barro Colorado Island in Panama in the vicinity of the Panama Canal, and the mountains of Jamaica. Adults have forewing lengths of 8.6–10.8 mm (0.34–0.43 in) and forewing widths of 4.2–5.2 mm (0.17–0.20 in). The forewings are brownish-orange, with indistinct oblique gray bands formed by dark scales. The hindwings are bronze-colored

== Taxonomy ==
Dicepolia vaga was formally described in 2009 by the American entomologist James E. Hayden based on an adult male specimen from Barro Colorado Island in Panama. The specific epithet is derived from the Latin word meaning "wandering", alluding to the disjunct range of this moth.

== Description ==
Adults of Dicepolia vaga have forewing lengths of 8.6–10.8 mm (0.34–0.43 in) and forewing widths of 4.2–5.2 mm (0.17–0.20 in). The forewings are brownish-orange, with indistinct oblique gray bands formed by dark scales. These bands are clearly visible on both the ventral and dorsal surfaces of the forewing. The ventral surface of the forewing is light brown towards the body and dark orange towards the tip. The hindwings are bronze-colored. Dorsally, the body is generally brownish-red, except for the pale yellow dorsal surface of the abdomen.

== Distribution and habitat ==
Dicepolia vaga has a disjunct range in Central America, South America, and the Caribbean. It is the only Dicepolia species found regularly in the Antilles, with D. roseobrunnea and D. rufitinctalis having only solitary records from the region. It is known from the Andes of Ecuador, Barro Colorado Island in Panama in the vicinity of the Panama Canal, and the mountains of Jamaica.
