= Dicepolia =

Scientific classification
- Domain: Eukaryota
- Kingdom: Animalia
- Phylum: Arthropoda
- Class: Insecta
- Order: Lepidoptera
- Family: Crambidae
- Tribe: Eurrhypini
- Genus: Dicepolia; Snellen in Snellen, 1892

Synonyms
- Endolophia Hampson, 1899

Genus of moths

Dicepolia is a genus of moths of the family Crambidae.

== Species ==
- Dicepolia aerealis Hayden, 2009
- Dicepolia amazonalis Hayden, 2009
- Dicepolia artoides Hayden, 2009
- Dicepolia bicolor Hayden, 2009
- Dicepolia cuiabalis Hayden, 2009
- Dicepolia marginescriptalis (Kenrick, 1917)
- Dicepolia marionalis (Viette, 1958)
- Dicepolia munroealis (Viette, 1960)
- Dicepolia nigritinctalis Hayden, 2010
- Dicepolia roseobrunnea (Warren, 1889)
- Dicepolia rufeolalis (Mabille, 1900)
- Dicepolia rufitinctalis (Hampson, 1899)
- Dicepolia vaga Hayden, 2009
- Dicepolia venezolalis Hayden, 2009
