= Lipararchis aspilus =

Scientific classification
- Domain: Eukaryota
- Kingdom: Animalia
- Phylum: Arthropoda
- Class: Insecta
- Order: Lepidoptera
- Family: Crambidae
- Genus: Lipararchis
- Species: L. aspilus

Binomial name
- Lipararchis aspilus (Turner, 1915)

Synonyms
- Calamochrous aspilus Turner, 1915

Species of moth

Lipararchis aspilus is a moth in the family Crambidae. It is found in Australia, where it has been recorded from the Northern Territory.

The wingspan is 25 mm. The forewings are uniform whitish-brown. The hindwings are whitish, thinly scaled, towards apex slightly brownish-tinged. Adults have been recorded on wing in November.
