= Autocharis sinualis =

Scientific classification
- Kingdom: Animalia
- Phylum: Arthropoda
- Class: Insecta
- Order: Lepidoptera
- Family: Crambidae
- Genus: Autocharis
- Species: A. sinualis

Binomial name
- Autocharis sinualis (Hampson, 1899)

Synonyms
- Noorda sinualis Hampson, 1899

Species of moth

Autocharis sinualis is a moth in the family Crambidae. It is found in Eritrea, Rwanda and South Africa.
