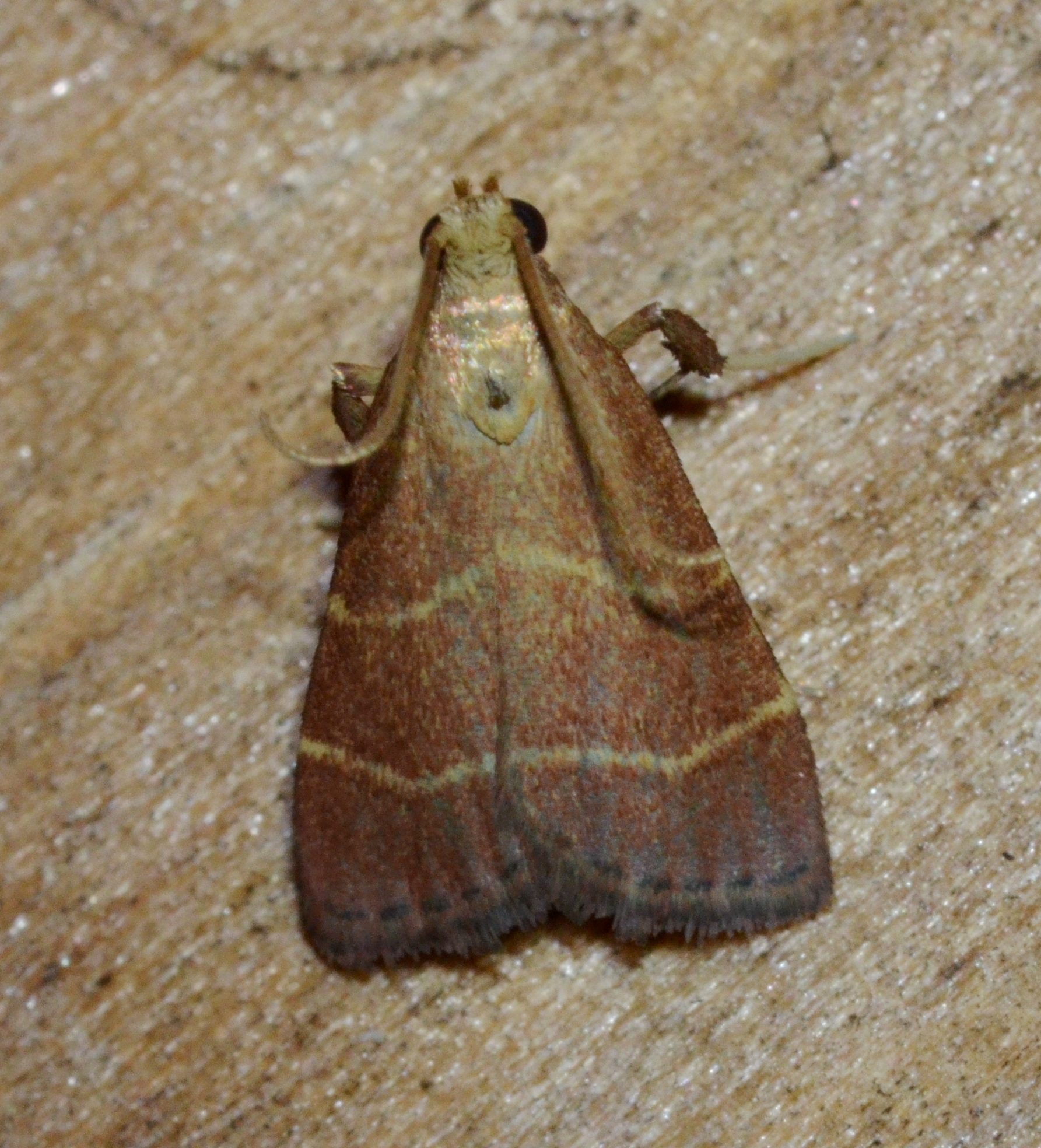

Scientific classification
- Kingdom: Animalia
- Phylum: Arthropoda
- Class: Insecta
- Order: Lepidoptera
- Family: Pyralidae
- Genus: Arta
- Species: A. statalis

Binomial name
- Arta statalis Grote, 1875

= Arta statalis =

Species of moth

Arta statalis, the posturing arta moth, is a species of snout moth in the genus Arta. It was described by Augustus Radcliffe Grote in 1875 and is the type species of its genus.

== Description ==
The wingspan of the posturing arta moth is about 15 mm and they rest with their hindwings tucked behind their forewings. The forewings are varying shades of brown and the shades are separated by thin, pale lines. Their yellow-brown antennae are most often positioned lying flat behind the head and over the wings when resting.

== Range and Habitat ==
The posturing arta moth is found in North America including Delaware, Florida, Georgia, Illinois, Iowa, Massachusetts, New Jersey, New York, North Carolina, Oklahoma, Pennsylvania, South Carolina, Tennessee and Virginia. It favors woodlands, residential areas and lake shorelines.

== Ecology ==
Little is known about the diet of this species. Its larval host plants are unknown and adults may not eat at all.
