= Lipararchis hyacinthopa =

Scientific classification
- Domain: Eukaryota
- Kingdom: Animalia
- Phylum: Arthropoda
- Class: Insecta
- Order: Lepidoptera
- Family: Crambidae
- Genus: Lipararchis
- Species: L. hyacinthopa

Binomial name
- Lipararchis hyacinthopa Meyrick, 1934

Species of moth

Lipararchis hyacinthopa is a moth in the family Crambidae. It was described by Edward Meyrick in 1934. It is found on Fiji.
