= Autocharis jacobsalis =

Scientific classification
- Kingdom: Animalia
- Phylum: Arthropoda
- Class: Insecta
- Order: Lepidoptera
- Family: Crambidae
- Genus: Autocharis
- Species: A. jacobsalis

Binomial name
- Autocharis jacobsalis (Marion & Viette, 1956)

Synonyms
- Noorda jacobsalis Marion & Viette, 1956

Species of moth

Autocharis jacobsalis is a moth in the family Crambidae. It was described by Hubert Marion and Pierre Viette in 1956. It is found in Madagascar and South Africa.
