= Dicepolia amazonalis =

Scientific classification
- Domain: Eukaryota
- Kingdom: Animalia
- Phylum: Arthropoda
- Class: Insecta
- Order: Lepidoptera
- Family: Crambidae
- Genus: Dicepolia
- Species: D. amazonalis

Binomial name
- Dicepolia amazonalis Hayden, 2009

Species of moth

Dicepolia amazonalis is a moth in the family Crambidae. It was described by James E. Hayden in 2009. It is found in the central Amazon basin, along the main trunk of the Amazon River and its tributaries.

The length of the forewings is 7.8–9 mm. Adults have been recorded on wing in February, from July to August and in September.

== Etymology ==
The species name refers to the distribution.
