= Autocharis ecthaemata =

Scientific classification
- Kingdom: Animalia
- Phylum: Arthropoda
- Class: Insecta
- Order: Lepidoptera
- Family: Crambidae
- Genus: Autocharis
- Species: A. ecthaemata

Binomial name
- Autocharis ecthaemata (Hampson, 1913)

Synonyms
- Noorda ecthaemata Hampson, 1913

Species of moth

Autocharis ecthaemata is a moth in the family Crambidae. It was described by George Hampson in 1913. It is found in Ethiopia, Kenya, Madagascar and on Aldabra atoll in the Seychelles.
