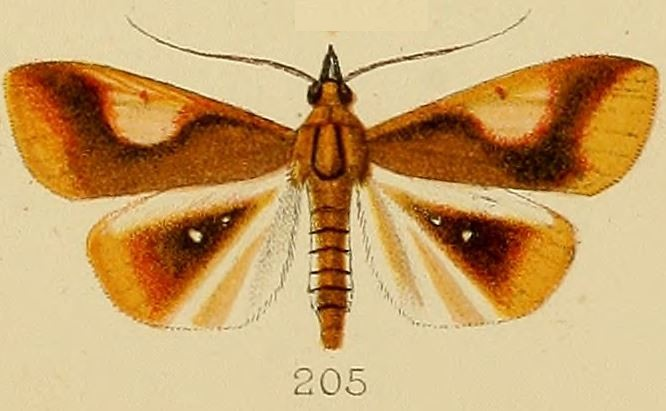

Scientific classification
- Domain: Eukaryota
- Kingdom: Animalia
- Phylum: Arthropoda
- Class: Insecta
- Order: Lepidoptera
- Family: Crambidae
- Genus: Calamochrous
- Species: C. albipunctalis

Binomial name
- Calamochrous albipunctalis Kenrick, 1907

= Calamochrous albipunctalis =

Species of moth

Calamochrous albipunctalis is a moth in the family Crambidae that is found in Papua New Guinea. It was described by George Hamilton Kenrick in 1907.

It has a wingspan of 44 mm.
