= Dicepolia rufitinctalis =

Scientific classification
- Kingdom: Animalia
- Phylum: Arthropoda
- Class: Insecta
- Order: Lepidoptera
- Family: Crambidae
- Genus: Dicepolia
- Species: D. rufitinctalis

Binomial name
- Dicepolia rufitinctalis (Hampson, 1899)

Synonyms
- Endolophia rufitinctalis Hampson, 1899

Species of moth

Dicepolia rufitinctalis is a moth in the family Crambidae. It was described by George Hampson in 1899. It is found from Veracruz in Mexico through Central America and across tropical South America to south-central Brazil (Federal District) along the coastal Andes. There is one record from the US state of Florida.

The length of the forewings is 5.1–7.2 mm. Adults have been recorded on wing from March to May in Central America, in February, from April to June and in September in northern South America and from August to November in the Andes.
