= Hemiscopis violacea =

Scientific classification
- Kingdom: Animalia
- Phylum: Arthropoda
- Clade: Pancrustacea
- Class: Insecta
- Order: Lepidoptera
- Family: Crambidae
- Genus: Hemiscopis
- Species: H. violacea

Binomial name
- Hemiscopis violacea (T. P. Lucas, 1892)

Synonyms
- Pyrausta violacea T. P. Lucas, 1892; Noorda nyctopa Turner, 1908

Species of moth

Hemiscopis violacea is a moth in the family Crambidae. It was described by Thomas Pennington Lucas in 1892. It is found in Australia, where it has been recorded from Queensland.

The wingspan is about 15 mm. The forewings are brown with two indistinct purplish bands.
