= Dicepolia cuiabalis =

Scientific classification
- Domain: Eukaryota
- Kingdom: Animalia
- Phylum: Arthropoda
- Class: Insecta
- Order: Lepidoptera
- Family: Crambidae
- Genus: Dicepolia
- Species: D. cuiabalis

Binomial name
- Dicepolia cuiabalis Hayden, 2009

Species of moth

Dicepolia cuiabalis is a moth in the family Crambidae. It was described by James E. Hayden in 2009. It is found in Brazil, where it has been recorded from Mato Grosso.

The length of the forewings is about 9.1 mm. Adults have been recorded on wing in late September.

== Etymology ==
The species name refers to Cuiabá, the city which is nearest to the type locality.
