= Calamochrous chilonalis =

Scientific classification
- Domain: Eukaryota
- Kingdom: Animalia
- Phylum: Arthropoda
- Class: Insecta
- Order: Lepidoptera
- Family: Crambidae
- Genus: Calamochrous
- Species: C. chilonalis

Binomial name
- Calamochrous chilonalis Lederer, 1863

Species of moth

Calamochrous chilonalis is a moth in the family Crambidae. It was described by Julius Lederer in 1863. It is found in Venezuela.
