= Autocharis vohilavalis =

Scientific classification
- Kingdom: Animalia
- Phylum: Arthropoda
- Class: Insecta
- Order: Lepidoptera
- Family: Crambidae
- Genus: Autocharis
- Species: A. vohilavalis

Binomial name
- Autocharis vohilavalis (Marion & Viette, 1956)

Synonyms
- Noorda vohilavalis Marion & Viette, 1956; Clupeosoma vohilavalis

Species of moth

Autocharis vohilavalis is a moth in the family Crambidae. It is found in Madagascar.
