= Autocharis bekilalis =

Scientific classification
- Kingdom: Animalia
- Phylum: Arthropoda
- Class: Insecta
- Order: Lepidoptera
- Family: Crambidae
- Genus: Autocharis
- Species: A. bekilalis

Binomial name
- Autocharis bekilalis (Marion & Viette, 1956)

Synonyms
- Noorda bekilalis Marion & Viette, 1956

Species of moth

Autocharis bekilalis is a moth in the family Crambidae. It was described by Hubert Marion and Pierre Viette in 1956. It is found on Madagascar.
