= Clupeosoma metachryson =

Scientific classification
- Kingdom: Animalia
- Phylum: Arthropoda
- Class: Insecta
- Order: Lepidoptera
- Family: Crambidae
- Genus: Clupeosoma
- Species: C. metachryson

Binomial name
- Clupeosoma metachryson Hampson, 1897

Species of moth

Clupeosoma metachryson is a moth in the family Crambidae. It was described by George Hampson in 1897. It is found in Papua New Guinea, where it has been recorded from Fergusson Island.

The wingspan is about 20 mm. The forewings are orange, suffused with fiery red scales and irrorated (speckled) with black. There is an orange antemedial line, as well as an ill-defined orange postmedial line. The hindwings are orange with a broad black marginal band.
