= Calamochrous pallidalis =

Scientific classification
- Kingdom: Animalia
- Phylum: Arthropoda
- Class: Insecta
- Order: Lepidoptera
- Family: Crambidae
- Genus: Calamochrous
- Species: C. pallidalis

Binomial name
- Calamochrous pallidalis Hampson, 1900

Species of moth

Calamochrous pallidalis is a moth in the family Crambidae, of the class Insecta. It was described by George Hampson in 1900. It is found in Central Asia.
