= Dicepolia bicolor =

Scientific classification
- Kingdom: Animalia
- Phylum: Arthropoda
- Clade: Pancrustacea
- Class: Insecta
- Order: Lepidoptera
- Family: Crambidae
- Genus: Dicepolia
- Species: D. bicolor

Binomial name
- Dicepolia bicolor Hayden, 2009

Species of moth

Dicepolia bicolor is a moth in the family Crambidae. It was described by the American entomologist James E. Hayden in 2009 and is named for its two-colored forewings. It is endemic to northwestern French Guiana. Adults have forewing lengths of 6.1–6.9 mm (0.24–0.27 in) and forewing widths of 2.9–3.9 mm (0.11–0.15 in). The forewings have a pale yellow to creamy white central region. The remainder of the forewing, both closer to the body and distal to the center, is dark wine-red in color. The hindwings are pale yellow towards the body, with the more distal regions, past three-fifth of the wing area, being wine-red.

== Taxonomy ==
Dicepolia bicolor was formally described in 2009 by the American entomologist James E. Hayden based on an adult male specimen from Saint-Jean-du-Maroni in French Guiana. The species is named after its highly contrasting, two-colored forewing.

== Description ==
Adults of Dicepolia bicolor have forewing lengths of 6.1–6.9 mm (0.24–0.27 in) and forewing widths of 2.9–3.9 mm (0.11–0.15 in). The species is mostly brownish-red to brownish-violet in its appearance. The forewings have a pale yellow to creamy white central region. The remainder of the forewing, both closer to the body and distal to the center, is dark wine-red in color. The costa are similarly colored. The ventral surface of the forewing is orange-red. The hindwings are pale yellow towards the body, with the more distal regions, past three-fifth of the wing area, being wine-red. The ventral surface of the hindwing is largely pale yellow.

== Distribution and habitat ==
Dicepolia bicolor is endemic to northwestern French Guiana. It is known from a single series collected in 1939 and is consequently poorly known.
