= Calamochrous brevipalpis =

Scientific classification
- Kingdom: Animalia
- Phylum: Arthropoda
- Class: Insecta
- Order: Lepidoptera
- Family: Crambidae
- Genus: Calamochrous
- Species: C. brevipalpis

Binomial name
- Calamochrous brevipalpis Snellen, 1890

Species of moth

Calamochrous brevipalpis is a moth in the family Crambidae. It was described by Snellen in 1890. It is found in India (Sikkim).
