= Autocharis phortalis =

Scientific classification
- Kingdom: Animalia
- Phylum: Arthropoda
- Class: Insecta
- Order: Lepidoptera
- Family: Crambidae
- Genus: Autocharis
- Species: A. phortalis

Binomial name
- Autocharis phortalis (Viette, 1958)

Synonyms
- Noorda phortalis Viette, 1958

Species of moth

Autocharis phortalis is a species of moth of the family Crambidae. It was described by Pierre Viette in 1958 and is found on Madagascar.

It has a wingspan of about 16.5–17 mm and the length of the forewings is 8 mm.

Viette placed this moth in a group with:

- Autocharis librodalis (Viette, 1958)
- Clupeosoma orientalalis (Viette, 1954)
