= Arta serialis =

Scientific classification
- Domain: Eukaryota
- Kingdom: Animalia
- Phylum: Arthropoda
- Class: Insecta
- Order: Lepidoptera
- Family: Pyralidae
- Genus: Arta
- Species: A. serialis

Binomial name
- Arta serialis Hampson, 1897

Species of moth

Arta serialis is a species of snout moth in the genus Arta. It was described by George Hampson in 1897 and is known from Brazil.
