= Arta bichordalis =

Scientific classification
- Domain: Eukaryota
- Kingdom: Animalia
- Phylum: Arthropoda
- Class: Insecta
- Order: Lepidoptera
- Family: Pyralidae
- Genus: Arta
- Species: A. bichordalis

Binomial name
- Arta bichordalis Ragonot, 1891

Species of moth

Arta bichordalis is a species of snout moth in the genus Arta. It was described by Émile Louis Ragonot, in 1891, and is known from Brazil.
