= Dicepolia nigritinctalis =

Scientific classification
- Domain: Eukaryota
- Kingdom: Animalia
- Phylum: Arthropoda
- Class: Insecta
- Order: Lepidoptera
- Family: Crambidae
- Genus: Dicepolia
- Species: D. nigritinctalis

Binomial name
- Dicepolia nigritinctalis Hayden, 2010

Species of moth

Dicepolia nigritinctalis is a moth in the family Crambidae. It was described by James E. Hayden in 2010. It is found in Cuba and Chiapas in Mexico.

The length of the forewings is 5–6 mm. Adults have been recorded on wing in June and July.

== Etymology ==
The species name refers to the uniform dark grey distal forewing fringe.
