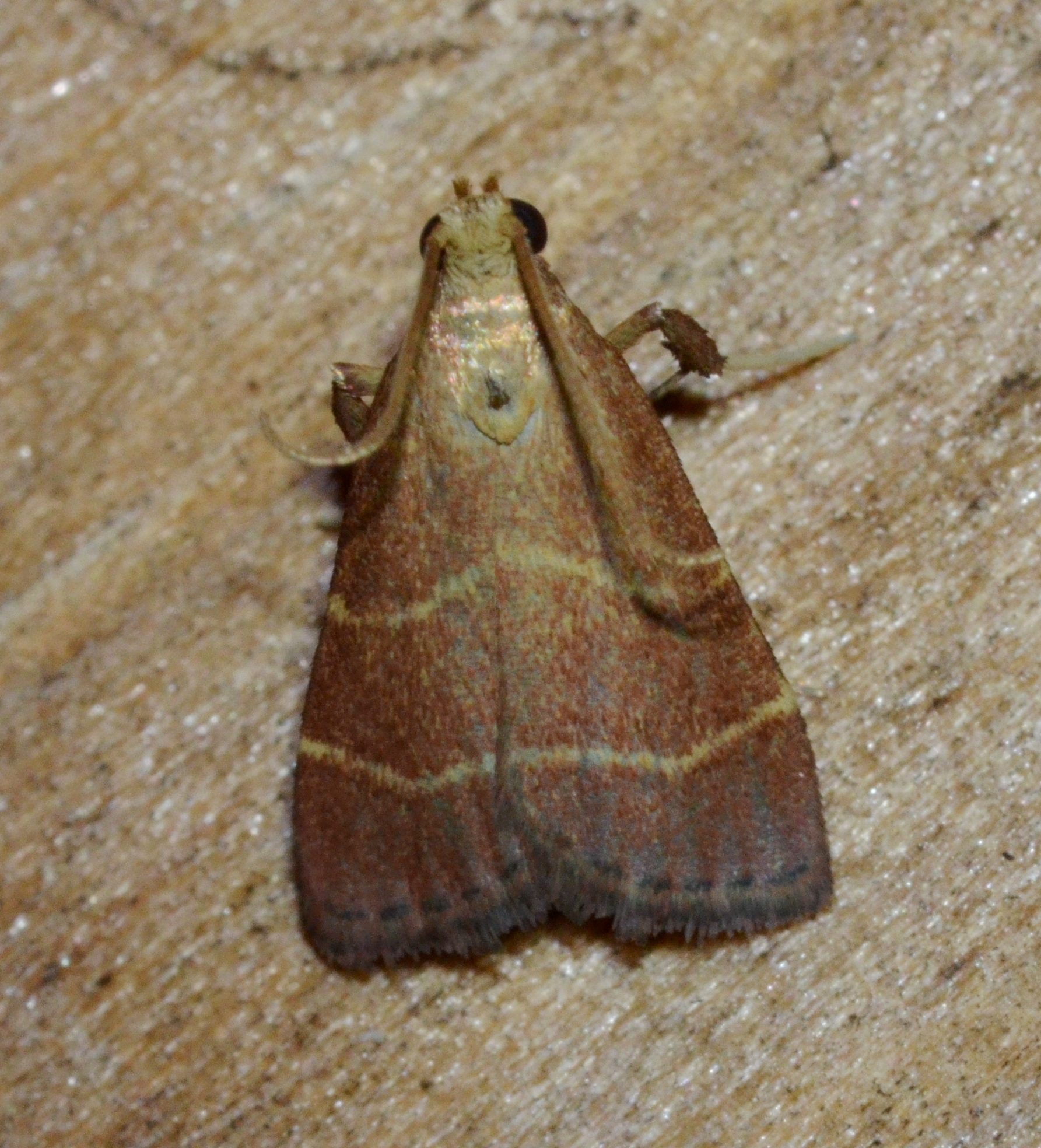
- Arta statalis

Scientific classification
- Kingdom: Animalia
- Phylum: Arthropoda
- Clade: Pancrustacea
- Class: Insecta
- Order: Lepidoptera
- Family: Pyralidae
- Subfamily: Chrysauginae
- Genus: Arta; Grote, 1875

Synonyms
- Xantippides Dyar, 1908

= Arta (moth) =

Genus of moths

Arta is a genus of snout moths. It was described by Augustus Radcliffe Grote in 1875.

== Species ==
- Arta bichordalis Ragonot, 1891 (from Brazil)
- Arta brevivalvalis Cashatt, 1968 (from Arizona)
- Arta calidalis Hampson, 1906 (from Central America)
- Arta encaustalis Ragonot, 1891 (from Brazil)
- Arta epicoenalis Ragonot, 1891 (from Arizona)
- Arta idioneura Meyrick, 1936 (from Venezuela)
- Arta incurvalis Schaus, 1913 (from Costa Rica)
- Arta olivalis Grote, 1878 (from USA)
- Arta serialis Hampson, 1897 (from Brazil)
- Arta solutalis Hampson, 1906 (from Central America)
- Arta statalis Grote, 1875 (from USA)
