= Autocharis carnosalis =

Scientific classification
- Kingdom: Animalia
- Phylum: Arthropoda
- Clade: Pancrustacea
- Class: Insecta
- Order: Lepidoptera
- Family: Crambidae
- Genus: Autocharis
- Species: A. carnosalis

Binomial name
- Autocharis carnosalis (Saalmüller, 1880)

Synonyms
- Botys carnosalis Saalmüller, 1880

Species of moth

Autocharis carnosalis is a species of moth of the family Crambidae. It was described by Max Saalmüller in 1880 and is found in northern Madagascar.

It has a wingspan of about 22 mm.
