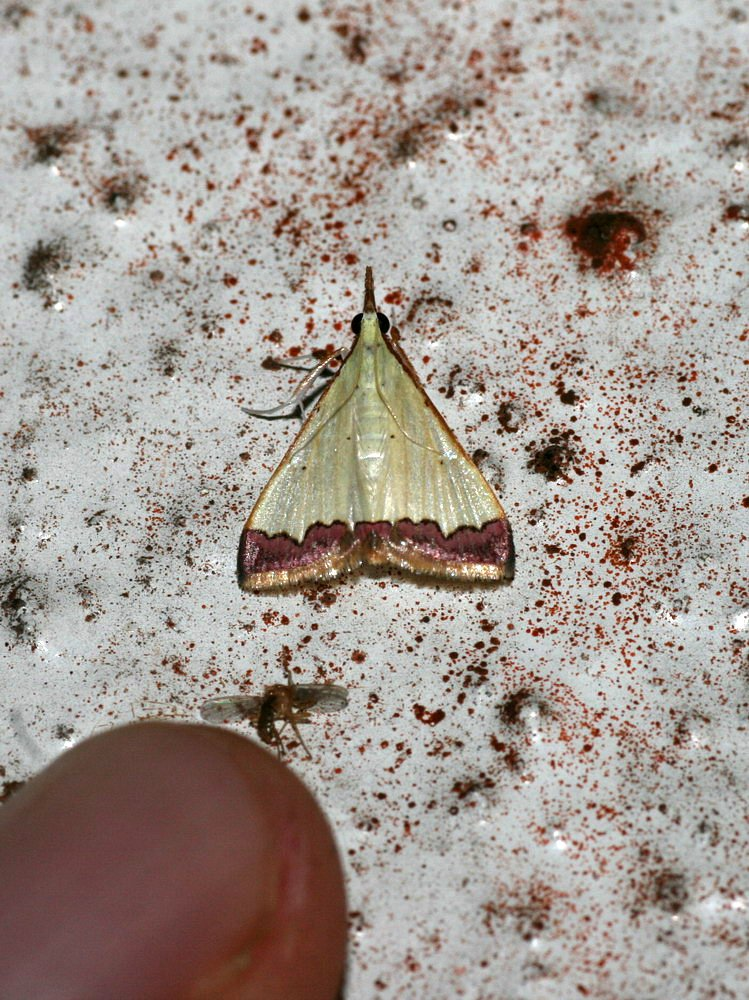

Scientific classification
- Domain: Eukaryota
- Kingdom: Animalia
- Phylum: Arthropoda
- Class: Insecta
- Order: Lepidoptera
- Family: Crambidae
- Genus: Autocharis
- Species: A. hedyphaes

Binomial name
- Autocharis hedyphaes (Turner, 1913)

Synonyms
- Noorda hedyphaes Turner, 1913

= Autocharis hedyphaes =

Species of moth

Autocharis hedyphaes is a moth of the family Crambidae described by Alfred Jefferis Turner in 1913. It is found in south-eastern Asia, including Malaysia. It is also present in Australia in northern Queensland.
