= Hemiscopis purpureum =

Scientific classification
- Kingdom: Animalia
- Phylum: Arthropoda
- Class: Insecta
- Order: Lepidoptera
- Family: Crambidae
- Genus: Hemiscopis
- Species: H. purpureum

Binomial name
- Hemiscopis purpureum (Inoue, 1982)

Synonyms
- Clupeosoma purpureum Inoue, 1982

Species of moth

Hemiscopis purpureum is a moth in the family Crambidae. It was described by Hiroshi Inoue in 1982. It is found in Japan.
