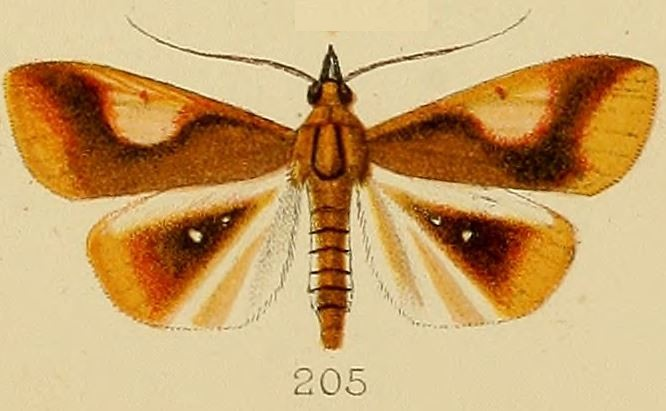
- Calamochrous albipunctalis

Scientific classification
- Kingdom: Animalia
- Phylum: Arthropoda
- Clade: Pancrustacea
- Class: Insecta
- Order: Lepidoptera
- Family: Crambidae
- Subfamily: Pyraustinae
- Genus: Calamochrous; Lederer, 1863

Synonyms
- Calamochrosta Lederer, 1863

= Calamochrous =

Genus of moths

Calamochrous is a genus of moths of the family Crambidae.

== Species ==
- Calamochrous chilonalis Lederer, 1863
- Calamochrous brevipalpis Snellen, 1890
- Calamochrous carnealis (Swinhoe, 1895)
- Calamochrous ferruginalis Hampson, 1896
- Calamochrous pallidalis Hampson, 1900
- Calamochrous albipunctalis Kenrick, 1907
- Calamochrous homochroalis Swinhoe, 1907
- Calamochrous purpuralis Hampson, 1908
- Calamochrous sarcalis Hampson, 1908
- Calamochrous fulvitinctalis Hampson, 1918
- Calamochrous minimalis Caradja, 1931
