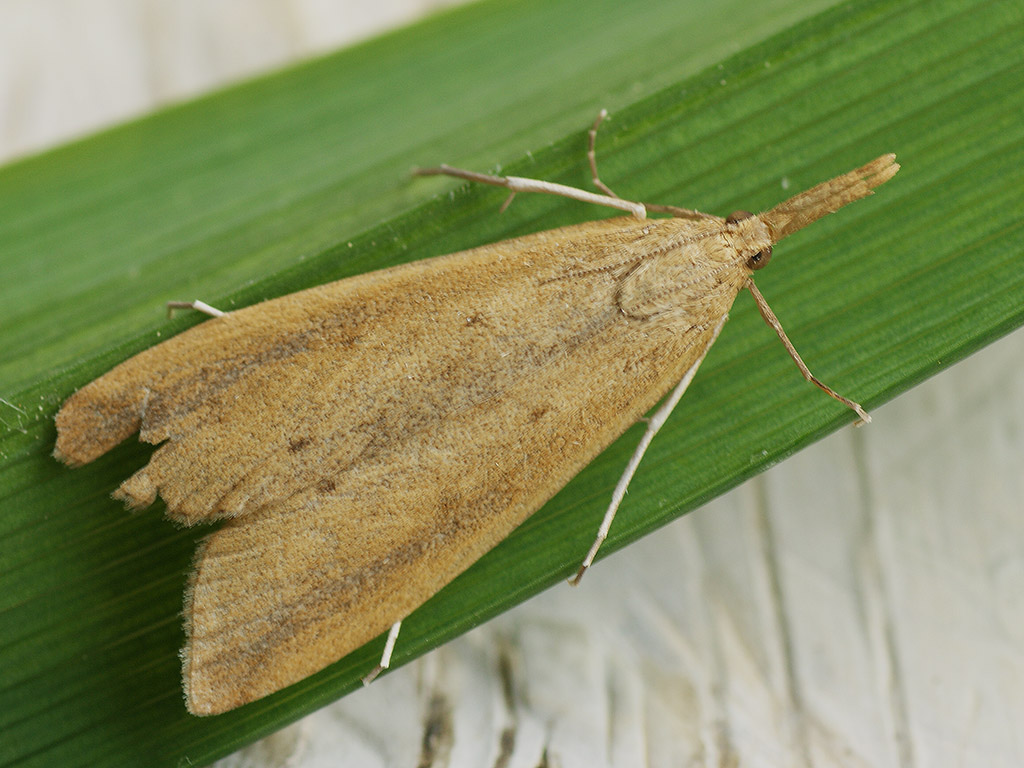
- Schoenobius gigantella

Scientific classification
- Kingdom: Animalia
- Phylum: Arthropoda
- Class: Insecta
- Order: Lepidoptera
- Family: Crambidae
- Subfamily: Schoenobiinae
- Genus: Schoenobius; Duponchel, 1836

Synonyms
- Erioproctus Zeller, 1839

= Schoenobius =

Genus of moths

Schoenobius is a genus of moths of the family Crambidae and typical of the subfamily Schoenobiinae. Species are found mostly in Europe.

== Species ==
- Schoenobius arimatheella (Schaus, 1922)
- Schoenobius damienella (Schaus, 1922)
- Schoenobius endochalybella (Hampson, 1896)
- Schoenobius endochralis (Hampson, 1919)
- Schoenobius flava (de Joannis, 1930)
- Schoenobius gigantella (Denis & Schiffermüller, 1775)
- Schoenobius immeritalis Walker, 1859
- Schoenobius irrorata (Hampson, 1919)
- Schoenobius latignathosius Amsel, 1956
- Schoenobius molybdoplecta (Dyar, 1914)
- Schoenobius parabolistes Meyrick, 1936 (from Brazil)
- Schoenobius pyraustalis Hampson, 1919
- Schoenobius retractalis (Hampson, 1919)
- Schoenobius sagitella (Hampson, 1896)
- Schoenobius scirpus Chen & Wu, 2014
- Schoenobius vittatalis (Hampson, 1919)
- Schoenobius vittatus Möschler, 1882

== Former species ==
- Schoenobius attenuata Hampson, 1919
- Schoenobius bipunctatus Rothschild in Sjöstedt, 1926
- Schoenobius caminarius Zeller, 1852
- Schoenobius hasegawai Shibuya, 1927
- Schoenobius ignitalis Hampson, 1919
- Schoenobius incertellus Walker, 1863
- Schoenobius melanostigmus Turner, 1922
