= Donacaula montivagellus =

Scientific classification
- Kingdom: Animalia
- Phylum: Arthropoda
- Clade: Pancrustacea
- Class: Insecta
- Order: Lepidoptera
- Family: Crambidae
- Genus: Donacaula
- Species: D. montivagellus

Binomial name
- Donacaula montivagellus (Zeller, 1863)

Synonyms
- Schoenobius montivagellus Zeller, 1863; Donacaula montivagella

Species of moth

Donacaula montivagellus is a moth in the family Crambidae. It was described by Philipp Christoph Zeller in 1863. It is found in Venezuela and Cuba.
