= Schoenobius pyraustalis =

Scientific classification
- Kingdom: Animalia
- Phylum: Arthropoda
- Class: Insecta
- Order: Lepidoptera
- Family: Crambidae
- Genus: Schoenobius
- Species: S. pyraustalis

Binomial name
- Schoenobius pyraustalis Hampson, 1919

Synonyms
- Chilo gildasellus Schaus, 1924; Schoenobius gildasellus

Species of moth

Schoenobius pyraustalis is a moth in the family Crambidae. It was described by George Hampson in 1919. It is found in Argentina.

The wingspan is about 22 mm. The forewings are yellowish, suffused with rufous, but the costal area is suffused with dark red brown up to the end of the cell. The hindwings are glossy white, tinged with brown, except towards the base.
