= Donacaula microforficellus =

Scientific classification
- Domain: Eukaryota
- Kingdom: Animalia
- Phylum: Arthropoda
- Class: Insecta
- Order: Lepidoptera
- Family: Crambidae
- Genus: Donacaula
- Species: D. microforficellus

Binomial name
- Donacaula microforficellus (Amsel, 1956)

Synonyms
- Schoenobius microforficella Amsel, 1956; Donacaula microforficella

Species of moth

Donacaula microforficellus is a moth in the family Crambidae. It was described by Hans Georg Amsel in 1956. It is found in Venezuela.
