= Donacaula dispersella =

Scientific classification
- Kingdom: Animalia
- Phylum: Arthropoda
- Clade: Pancrustacea
- Class: Insecta
- Order: Lepidoptera
- Family: Crambidae
- Genus: Donacaula
- Species: D. dispersella

Binomial name
- Donacaula dispersella (Robinson, 1870)

Synonyms
- Schoenobius dispersellus Robinson, 1870; Donacaula dispersellus; Schoenobius melinellus dispersellus; Donacaula melinella dispersella

Species of moth

Donacaula dispersella is a moth in the family Crambidae. It was described by Robinson in 1870. It is found in North America, where it has been recorded from Alberta, Manitoba, Nova Scotia, Ontario, Quebec, Saskatchewan, Arizona, Arkansas, Colorado, Connecticut, Florida, Georgia, Illinois, Kansas, Kentucky, Louisiana, Maine, Maryland, Massachusetts, Michigan, Mississippi, Nebraska, Nevada, New Hampshire, New Jersey, New York, North Carolina, Oklahoma, Pennsylvania, South Carolina, Tennessee, Texas, Utah, Vermont and Virginia.
