= Donacaula unipunctellus =

Scientific classification
- Domain: Eukaryota
- Kingdom: Animalia
- Phylum: Arthropoda
- Class: Insecta
- Order: Lepidoptera
- Family: Crambidae
- Genus: Donacaula
- Species: D. unipunctellus

Binomial name
- Donacaula unipunctellus (Robinson, 1870)

Synonyms
- Schoenobius unipunctellus Robinson, 1870; Donacaula unipunctella

Species of moth

Donacaula unipunctellus is a moth in the family Crambidae. It was described by Robinson in 1870. It is found in North America, where it has been recorded from Nova Scotia, Alabama, Florida, Georgia, Louisiana, Maine, Mississippi, New Jersey, New York, North Carolina, South Carolina, Texas, Utah and Virginia.

Adults have been recorded on wing nearly year round in the southern part of the range.
