= Schoenobius damienella =

Scientific classification
- Domain: Eukaryota
- Kingdom: Animalia
- Phylum: Arthropoda
- Class: Insecta
- Order: Lepidoptera
- Family: Crambidae
- Genus: Schoenobius
- Species: S. damienella

Binomial name
- Schoenobius damienella (Schaus, 1922)

Synonyms
- Platytes damienella Schaus, 1922

Species of moth

Schoenobius damienella is a moth in the family Crambidae. It was described by Schaus in 1922. It is found in Brazil.
