= Donacaula rufalis =

Scientific classification
- Kingdom: Animalia
- Phylum: Arthropoda
- Class: Insecta
- Order: Lepidoptera
- Family: Crambidae
- Genus: Donacaula
- Species: D. rufalis

Binomial name
- Donacaula rufalis (Hampson, 1919)

Synonyms
- Schoenobius rufalis Hampson, 1919

Species of moth

Donacaula rufalis is a moth in the family Crambidae. It was described by George Hampson in 1919. It is found in Kenya, Madagascar and Uganda.
