= Schoenobius parabolistes =

Scientific classification
- Kingdom: Animalia
- Phylum: Arthropoda
- Class: Insecta
- Order: Lepidoptera
- Family: Crambidae
- Genus: Schoenobius
- Species: S. parabolistes

Binomial name
- Schoenobius parabolistes Meyrick, 1936

Synonyms
- Chilo scissellus Berg (nec. McVind)

Species of moth

Schoenobius parabolistes is a moth in the family Crambidae. It is found in Brazil (Rio Grande del Sul) and Argentina.
