= Donacaula flavus =

Scientific classification
- Domain: Eukaryota
- Kingdom: Animalia
- Phylum: Arthropoda
- Class: Insecta
- Order: Lepidoptera
- Family: Crambidae
- Genus: Donacaula
- Species: D. flavus

Binomial name
- Donacaula flavus de Joannis, 1929

Species of moth

Donacaula flavus is a moth in the family Crambidae. It was described by Joseph de Joannis in 1929. It is found in Vietnam.
