= Donacaula albicostella =

Scientific classification
- Domain: Eukaryota
- Kingdom: Animalia
- Phylum: Arthropoda
- Class: Insecta
- Order: Lepidoptera
- Family: Crambidae
- Genus: Donacaula
- Species: D. albicostella

Binomial name
- Donacaula albicostella (Fernald, 1888)

Synonyms
- Schoenobius melinellus albicostellus Fernald, 1888; Donacula melinellus albicostellus; Schoenobius melinellus uniformellus Dyar, 1917; Donacula melinellus uniformellus

Species of moth

Donacaula albicostella is a moth in the family Crambidae. It was described by Charles H. Fernald in 1888. It is found in North America, where it has been recorded from Alberta, British Columbia, Manitoba, California, Connecticut, Illinois, Maine, Massachusetts, Michigan, Minnesota, New Jersey, Utah and Wisconsin.
