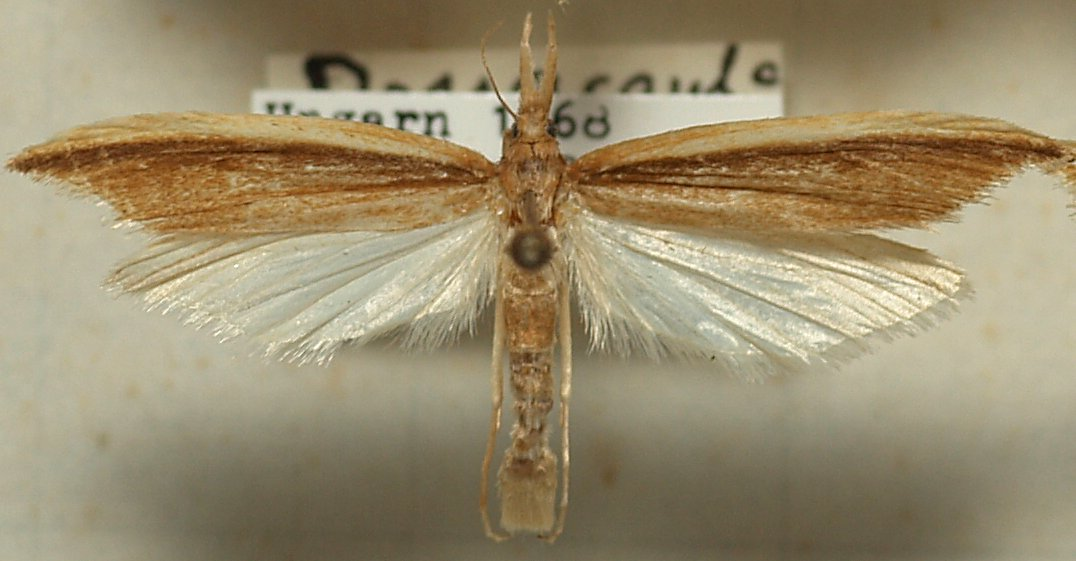

Scientific classification
- Domain: Eukaryota
- Kingdom: Animalia
- Phylum: Arthropoda
- Class: Insecta
- Order: Lepidoptera
- Family: Crambidae
- Genus: Donacaula
- Species: D. mucronella

Binomial name
- Donacaula mucronella (Denis & Schiffermüller, 1775)

Synonyms
- Tinea mucronella Denis & Schiffermüller, 1775; Crambus mucronatus Fabricius, 1798; Tinea acuminella Hübner, 1805; Thopeutis acuminalis Hübner, 1825

= Donacaula mucronella =

Species of moth

Donacaula mucronella is a species of moth of the family Crambidae. It is found in Europe.

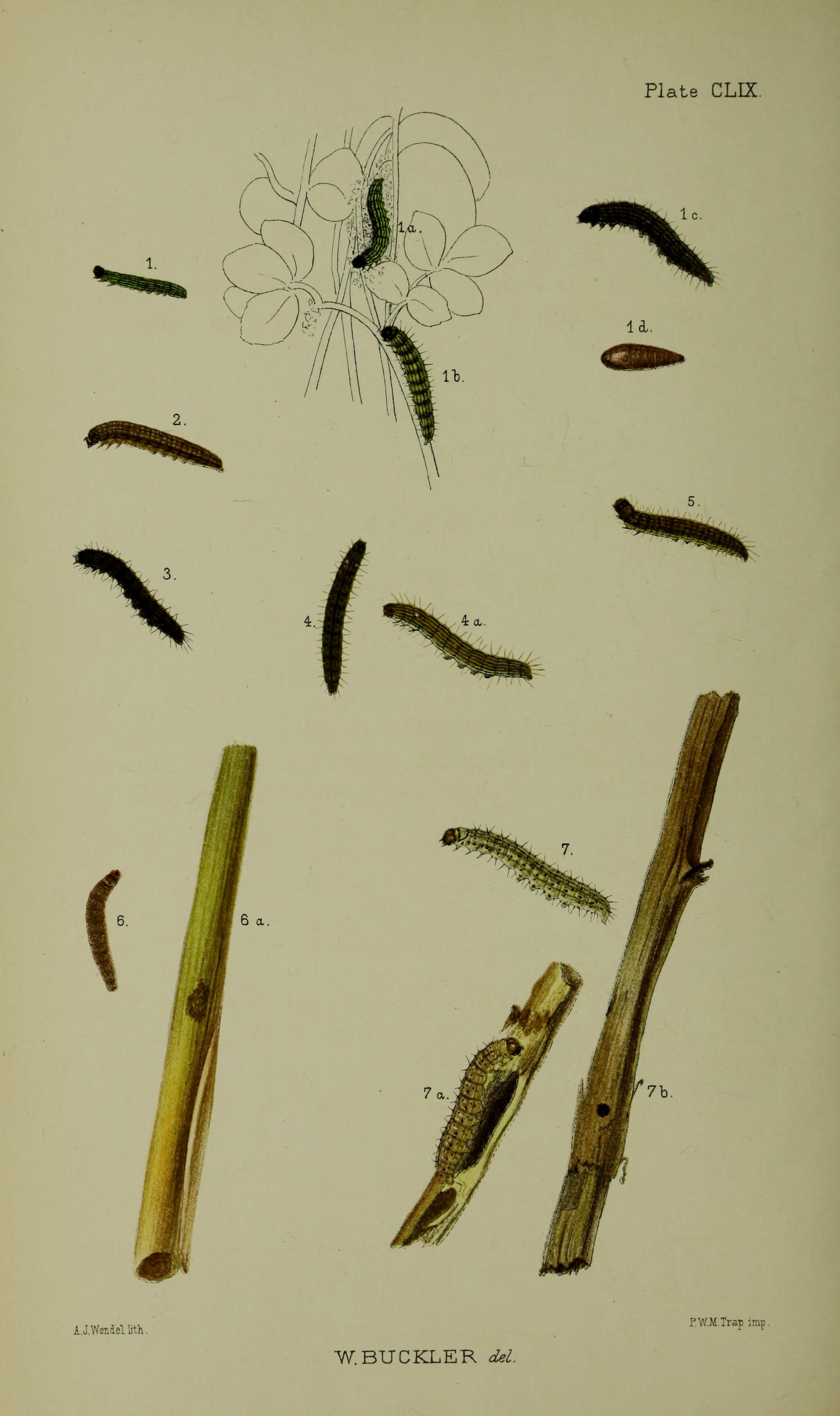
Fig. 6 larva after final moult 6a stem of Carex containing it

The wingspan is 22–26 mm for the male and 29–35 mm for females. The forewings are brown; an ochreous- whitish costal streak, edged below with dark fuscous suffusion. Hindwings fuscous-whitish. See also Parsons et al.

The moth flies from June to September depending on the location.

The larvae feed on Carex, Carex riparia, Glyceria maxima and Phragmites.
