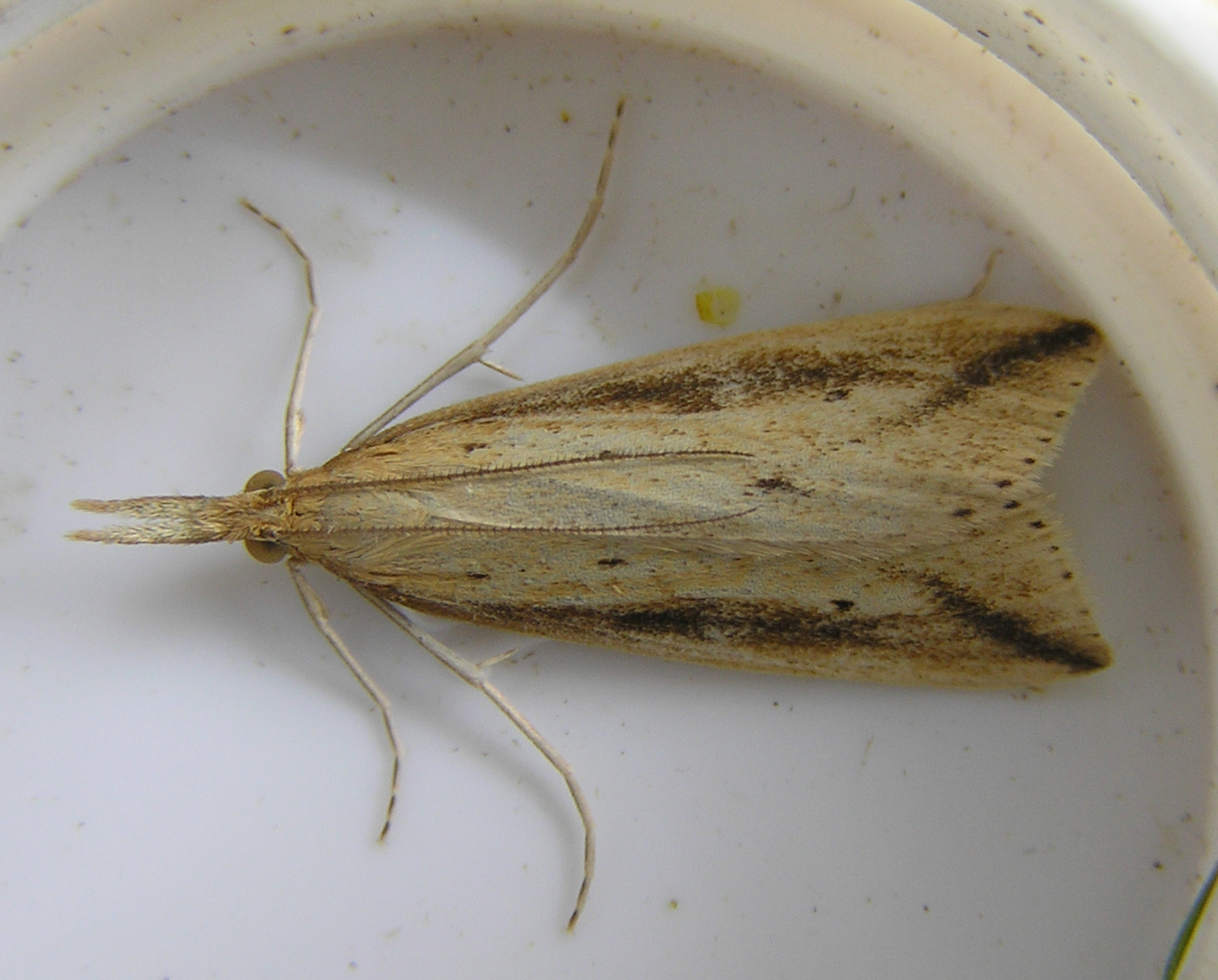
- Male

Scientific classification
- Kingdom: Animalia
- Phylum: Arthropoda
- Class: Insecta
- Order: Lepidoptera
- Family: Crambidae
- Genus: Donacaula
- Species: D. forficella

Binomial name
- Donacaula forficella (Thunberg, 1794)

Synonyms
- Schoenobius forficella; Tinea forficella Thunberg, 1794; Chilo caudellus Stephens, 1834; Donacaula forficella f. intermedia Dufrane, 1957; Donacaula forficella f. tripartita Dufrane, 1957; Palparia caudea Haworth, 1811; Palparia consorta Haworth, 1811; Palparia hirta Haworth, 1811; Schoenobius forficellus ab. uniformata Dufrane, 1946; Tinea consortella Hübner, 1796; Tinea lanceolella Hübner, 1810; Topeutis lanceolalis Hübner, 1825

= Donacaula forficella =

Species of moth

Donacaula forficella is a species of moth of the family Crambidae described by Carl Peter Thunberg in 1794. It is found in China (Heilongjiang), Europe and South Africa.

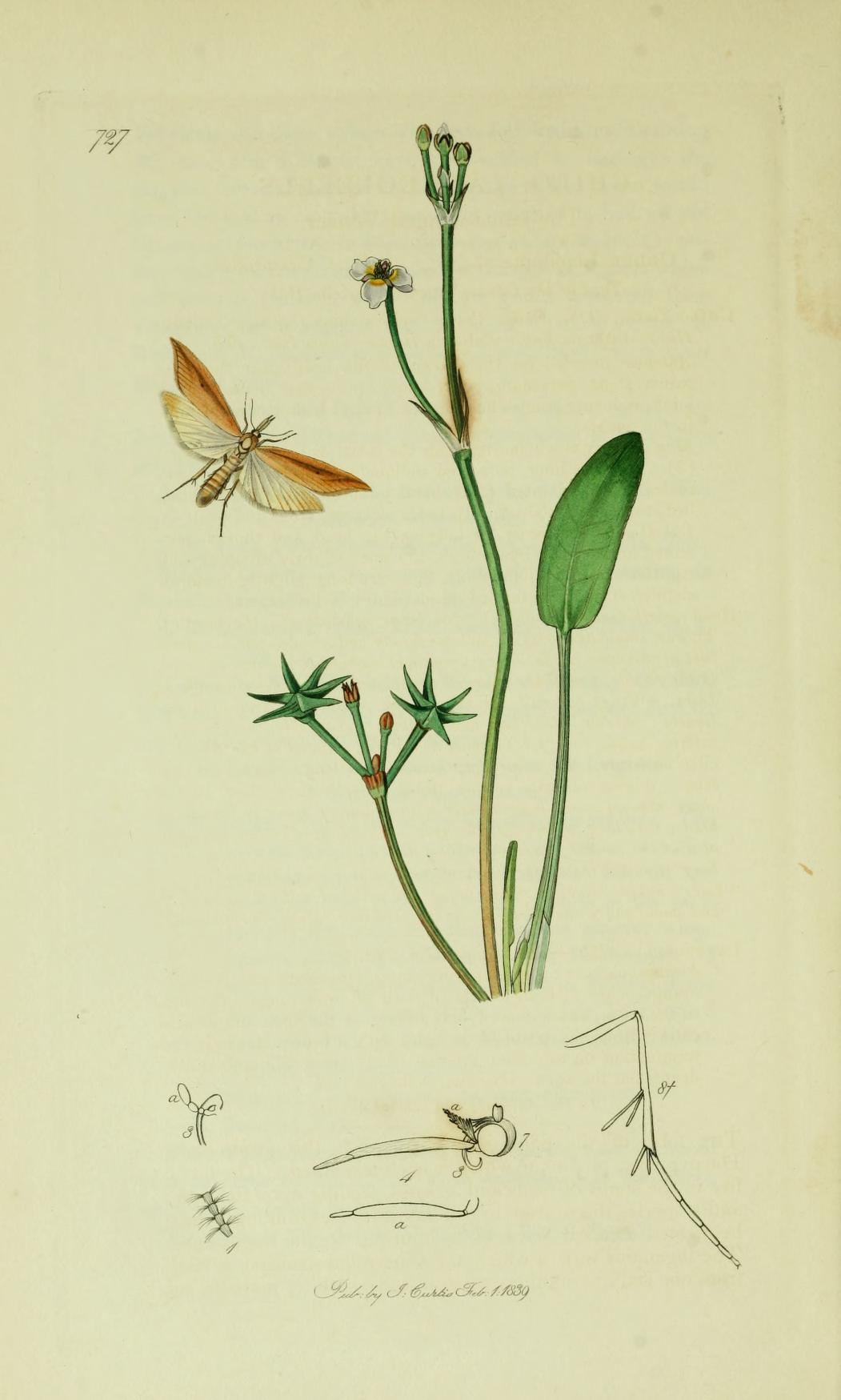
Illustration from John Curtis's British Entomology Volume 6

The wingspan is 25–30 mm. The forewings are pale ochre in both sexes. In the apical area there is an oblique characteristic line, which can also be very weak or almost invisible. Specimens with a reduced apical line are called Form uniformata Dufrane, 1946.

The larvae feed on Carex, Glyceria maxima and Phragmites.
