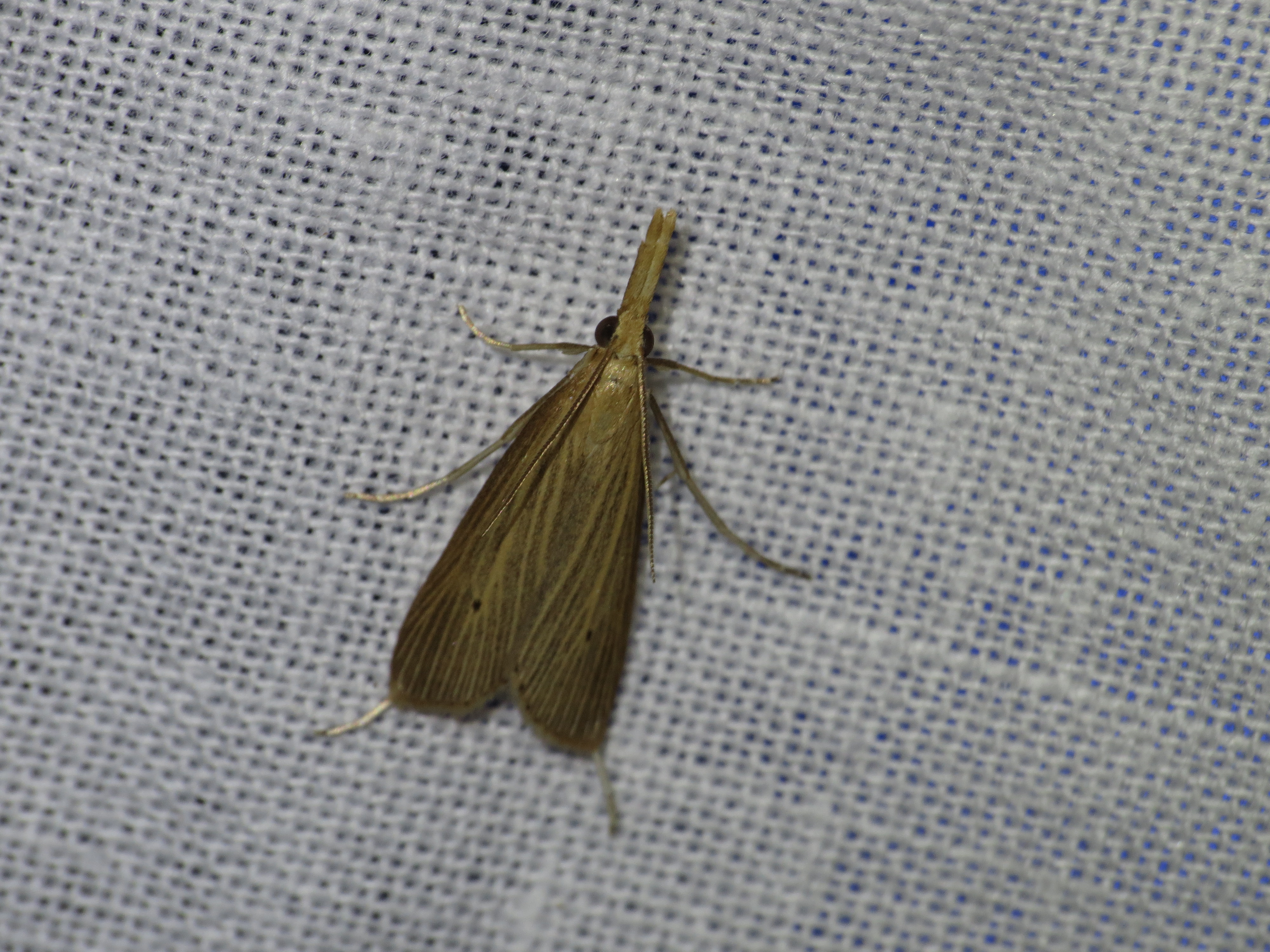
- Donacaula roscidellus (Dyar, 1917), to MV light, Kissimmee, Florida, 2015

Scientific classification
- Kingdom: Animalia
- Phylum: Arthropoda
- Class: Insecta
- Order: Lepidoptera
- Family: Crambidae
- Genus: Donacaula
- Species: D. roscidellus

Binomial name
- Donacaula roscidellus (Dyar, 1917)

Synonyms
- Schoenobius roscidellus Dyar, 1917; Donacaula roscidellus; Schoenobius bicolorellus Hoffmann, 1932; Donacaula bicolorellus; Donacaula bicolorella

= Donacaula roscidellus =

Species of moth

Donacaula roscidellus, the brown donacaula moth, is a moth in the family Crambidae. It was described by Harrison Gray Dyar Jr. in 1917. It is found in Mexico (Veracruz) and the United States, where it has been recorded from Florida, Kentucky, Louisiana, Mississippi and Texas.

The length of the forewings is 18–30 mm. Adults have been recorded on wing from February to November.
