= Schoenobius immeritalis =

Scientific classification
- Kingdom: Animalia
- Phylum: Arthropoda
- Class: Insecta
- Order: Lepidoptera
- Family: Crambidae
- Genus: Schoenobius
- Species: S. immeritalis

Binomial name
- Schoenobius immeritalis Walker, 1859

Synonyms
- Araxes decursella Walker, 1863; Schoenobius micralis Hampson, 1919

Species of moth

Schoenobius immeritalis is a moth in the family Crambidae. It was described by Francis Walker in 1859. It is found in Sri Lanka and Fujian, China.

== Description ==
The wingspan of the male is 14–20 mm and the female is 14–28 mm. Palpi with second joint about twice the length of head. Male bright ochreous-yellow colored. Hindwings paler. Female straw colored with fulvous anal tuft and whitish hindwings.
