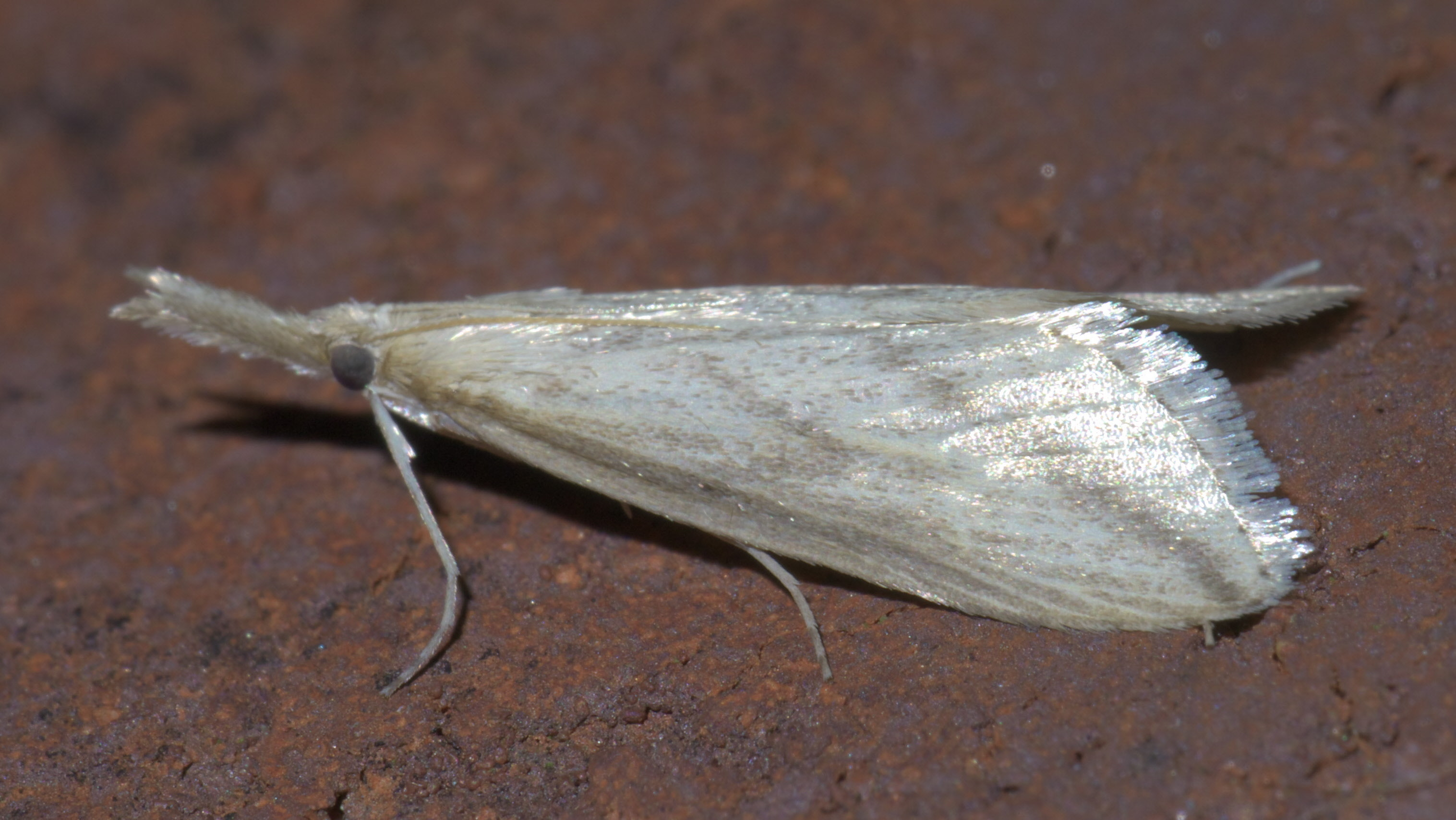
- Donacaula longirostrallus, crambid snout moth

Scientific classification
- Kingdom: Animalia
- Phylum: Arthropoda
- Clade: Pancrustacea
- Class: Insecta
- Order: Lepidoptera
- Family: Crambidae
- Genus: Donacaula
- Species: D. longirostrallus

Binomial name
- Donacaula longirostrallus (Clemens, 1860)

Synonyms
- Chilo longirostrallus Clemens, 1861; Schoenobius longirostrellus; Donacaula longirostrella; Schoenobius amblyptepennis Dyar, 1917; Donacaula amblyptepennis

= Donacaula longirostrallus =

Species of moth

Donacaula longirostrallus, the long-beaked donacaula moth, is a moth in the family Crambidae. It was described by James Brackenridge Clemens in 1860. It is found in North America, where it has been recorded from Nova Scotia, Ontario, Quebec, Alabama, Arkansas, Connecticut, Florida, Louisiana, Maine, Massachusetts, Michigan, Mississippi, Nebraska, New Jersey, New York, North Carolina, Pennsylvania, Texas, Vermont and Virginia.

The length of the forewings is 22–28 mm. Adults have been recorded on wing from May to September.
