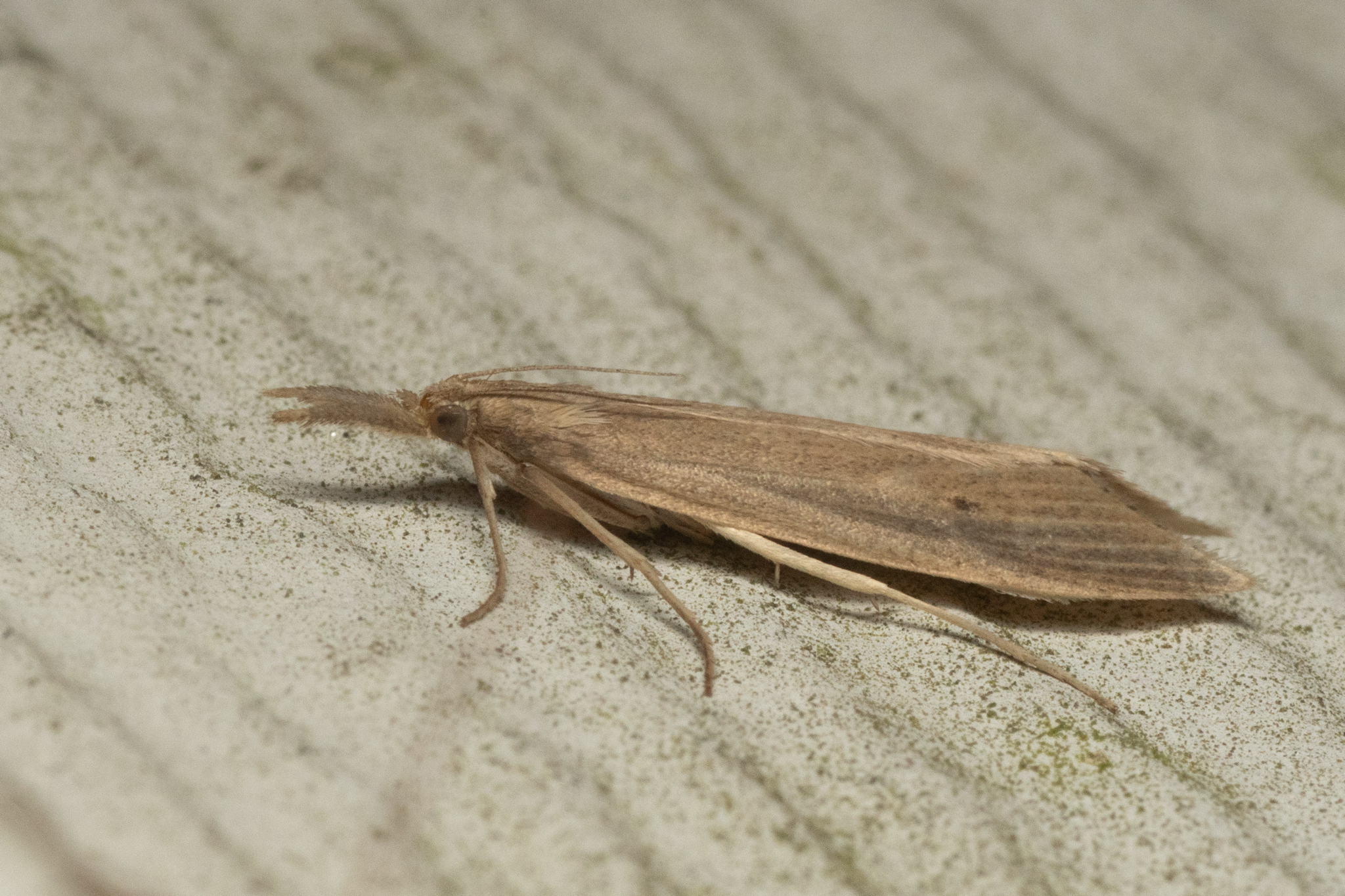

Scientific classification
- Kingdom: Animalia
- Phylum: Arthropoda
- Clade: Pancrustacea
- Class: Insecta
- Order: Lepidoptera
- Family: Crambidae
- Genus: Donacaula
- Species: D. aquilellus

Binomial name
- Donacaula aquilellus (Clemens, 1860)

Synonyms
- Chilo aquilellus Clemens, 1861; Schoenobius aquilellus; Donacaula aquilella; Schoenobius clemensellus Robinson, 1870

= Donacaula aquilellus =

Species of moth

Donacaula aquilellus is a species of moth in the family Crambidae. It was described by James Brackenridge Clemens in 1860. It is found in North America, where it has been recorded from Alabama, Georgia, Massachusetts, Mississippi, New Jersey, New York, North Carolina and South Carolina.

== Description ==
The length of the forewings is 21–35 mm. Adults have been recorded on wing from April to September and in December.
