= Donacaula pallulellus =

Scientific classification
- Domain: Eukaryota
- Kingdom: Animalia
- Phylum: Arthropoda
- Class: Insecta
- Order: Lepidoptera
- Family: Crambidae
- Genus: Donacaula
- Species: D. pallulellus

Binomial name
- Donacaula pallulellus (Barnes & McDunnough, 1912)

Synonyms
- Schoenobius pallulellus Barnes & McDunnough, 1912; Donacaula pallulella

Species of moth

Donacaula pallulellus is a moth in the family Crambidae. It was described by William Barnes and James Halliday McDunnough in 1912. It is found in North America, where it has been recorded from Alabama, Arizona, California, New York and Texas.

The length of the forewings is 20–30 mm. Adults have been recorded on wing from June to July and in September.
