= Schoenobius retractalis =

Scientific classification
- Kingdom: Animalia
- Phylum: Arthropoda
- Class: Insecta
- Order: Lepidoptera
- Family: Crambidae
- Genus: Schoenobius
- Species: S. retractalis

Binomial name
- Schoenobius retractalis (Hampson, 1919)

Synonyms
- Argyria retractalis Hampson, 1919

Species of moth

Schoenobius retractalis is a moth in the family Crambidae. It was described by George Hampson in 1919. It is found in Guyana.

The wingspan is 16 mm. The basal area of the forewings is white with a cupreous-brown costal edge. There is a patch of cupreous-brown suffusion and a black antemedial line. The medial area is cupreous brown with a white streak below the costa. The hindwings are silky white with a cupreous-brown terminal line.
