= Schoenobius vittatus =

Scientific classification
- Domain: Eukaryota
- Kingdom: Animalia
- Phylum: Arthropoda
- Class: Insecta
- Order: Lepidoptera
- Family: Crambidae
- Genus: Schoenobius
- Species: S. vittatus

Binomial name
- Schoenobius vittatus Möschler, 1882

Synonyms
- Chilo vinosellus Hampson, 1896

Species of moth

Schoenobius vittatus is a moth in the family Crambidae. It was described by Heinrich Benno Möschler in 1882. It is found in Suriname and Belize.

The wingspan is about 30 mm. The forewings are dark red-brown with a purplish tinge and with purplish suffusion in the cell and on the outer area. There is also a whitish mark at the lower angle of the cell and a series of whitish submarginal specks. There is a marginal series of black specks. The hindwings are paler, except for the outer area.
