= Donacaula sordidellus =

Scientific classification
- Domain: Eukaryota
- Kingdom: Animalia
- Phylum: Arthropoda
- Class: Insecta
- Order: Lepidoptera
- Family: Crambidae
- Genus: Donacaula
- Species: D. sordidellus

Binomial name
- Donacaula sordidellus (Zincken, 1821)

Synonyms
- Chilo sordidellus Zincken, 1821; Schoenobius sordidellus; Donacaula sordidella

Species of moth

Donacaula sordidellus is a moth in the family Crambidae. It was described by Johann Leopold Theodor Friedrich Zincken in 1821. It is found in North America, where it has been recorded from Florida, Louisiana, Mississippi, Nebraska, New Jersey, New York, North Carolina, North Dakota, South Carolina and Texas.

Adults have been recorded on wing year round in the southern part of the range.
