= Schoenobius latignathosius =

Scientific classification
- Domain: Eukaryota
- Kingdom: Animalia
- Phylum: Arthropoda
- Class: Insecta
- Order: Lepidoptera
- Family: Crambidae
- Genus: Schoenobius
- Species: S. latignathosius

Binomial name
- Schoenobius latignathosius Amsel, 1956

Species of moth

Schoenobius latignathosius is a moth in the family Crambidae. It was described by Hans Georg Amsel in 1956 and is found in Venezuela.
