= Schoenobius arimatheella =

Scientific classification
- Domain: Eukaryota
- Kingdom: Animalia
- Phylum: Arthropoda
- Class: Insecta
- Order: Lepidoptera
- Family: Crambidae
- Genus: Schoenobius
- Species: S. arimatheella

Binomial name
- Schoenobius arimatheella (Schaus, 1922)

Synonyms
- Platytes arimatheella Schaus, 1922; Platytes arimathaeella Bleszynski, 1966

Species of moth

Schoenobius arimatheella is a moth in the family Crambidae. It was described by Schaus in 1922. It is found in Nicaragua.
