= Donacaula porrectellus =

Scientific classification
- Kingdom: Animalia
- Phylum: Arthropoda
- Class: Insecta
- Order: Lepidoptera
- Family: Crambidae
- Genus: Donacaula
- Species: D. porrectellus

Binomial name
- Donacaula porrectellus (Walker, 1863)

Synonyms
- Chilo porrectellus Walker, 1863; Donacaula porrectella

Species of moth

Donacaula porrectellus is a moth in the family Crambidae. It was described by Francis Walker in 1863. It is found in Bolivia, Brazil (Mato Grosso, Pará), Guyana, Peru and Venezuela.
