= Donacaula immanis =

Scientific classification
- Kingdom: Animalia
- Phylum: Arthropoda
- Clade: Pancrustacea
- Class: Insecta
- Order: Lepidoptera
- Family: Crambidae
- Genus: Donacaula
- Species: D. immanis

Binomial name
- Donacaula immanis (Zeller, 1877)

Synonyms
- Schoenobius immanis Zeller, 1877; Schoenobius lanceolellus Hampson, 1895; Donacaula lanceolella; Donacaula lanceolellus

Species of moth

Donacaula immanis is a moth in the family Crambidae. It was described by Philipp Christoph Zeller in 1877. It is found in Bolivia and the Brazilian states of Amazonas and Rio Grande do Sul.
