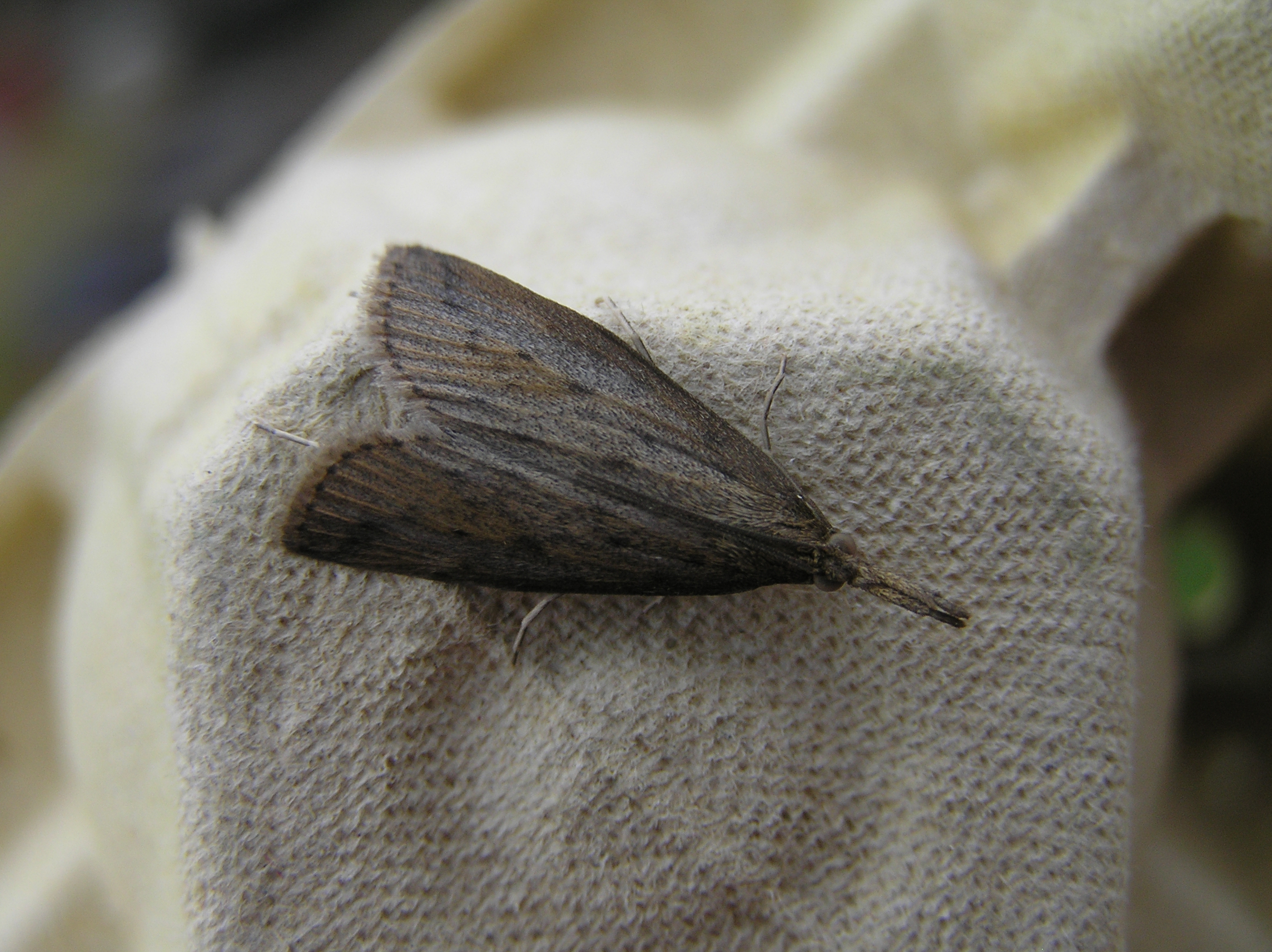
- Male
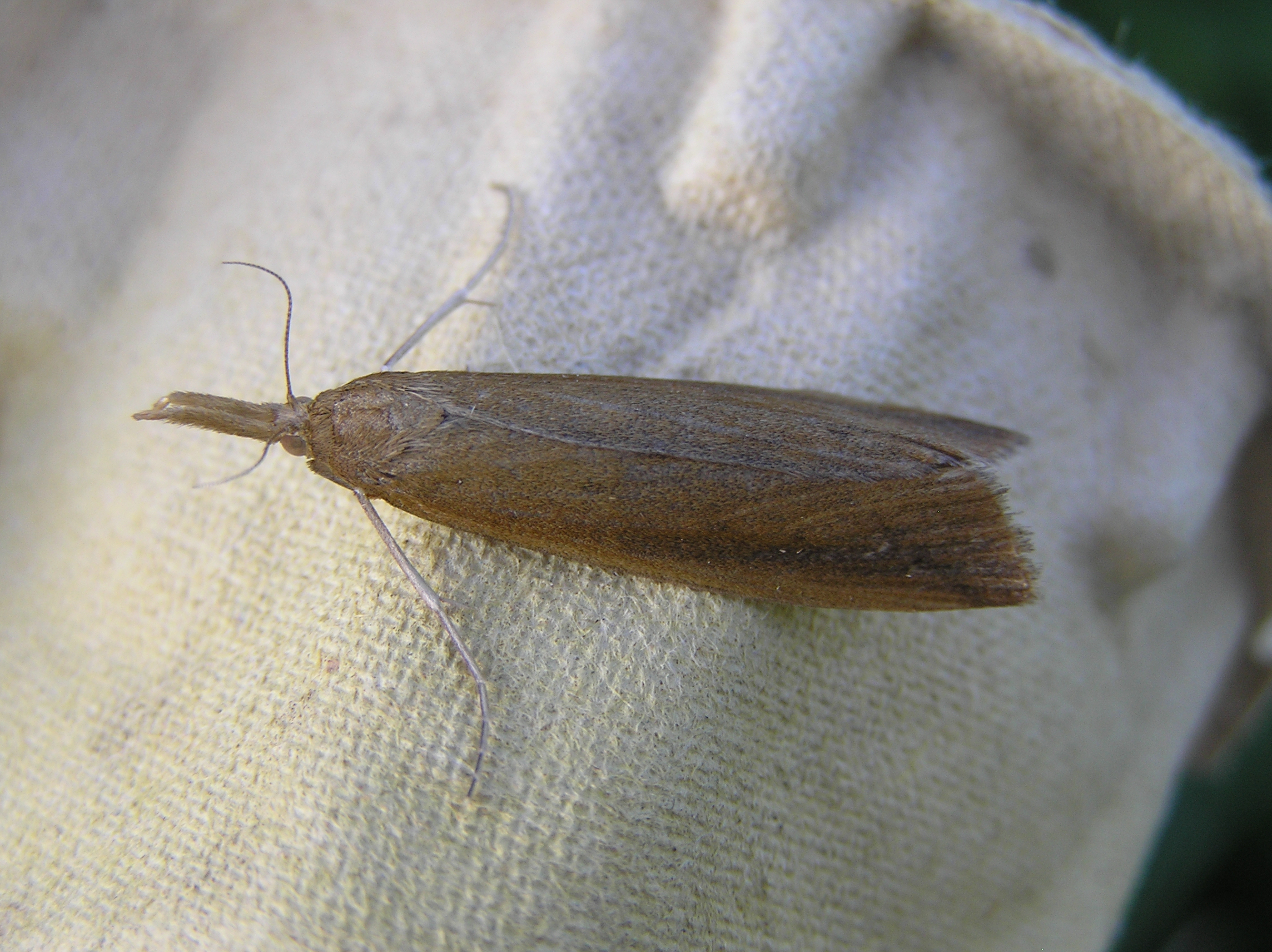
- Female

Scientific classification
- Domain: Eukaryota
- Kingdom: Animalia
- Phylum: Arthropoda
- Class: Insecta
- Order: Lepidoptera
- Family: Crambidae
- Genus: Schoenobius
- Species: S. gigantella

Binomial name
- Schoenobius gigantella (Denis & Schiffermüller, 1775)

Synonyms
- Tinea gigantella Denis & Schiffermüller, 1775; Chilo punctigerellus Stephens, 1834; Chilo punctigerellus Stephens, 1829; Chilo spurcatellus Walker, 1863; Schoenobius gigantella majoralis Hampson, 1896; Palparia fumea Haworth, 1811; Palparia gigantea Haworth, 1811; Schoenobius gigantella sasakii Inoue, 1982; Schoenobius gigantellus ab. punctivittellus Erfurth, 1933; Schoenobius gigantellus f. nigristriellus Popescu-Gorj, Olaru & Draghia, 1972; Topeutis gigantalis Hübner, 1825

= Schoenobius gigantella =

Species of moth

Schoenobius gigantella is a species of moth of the family Crambidae. It is found in Europe and China (Heilongjiang, Neimenggu, Beijing, Tianjin, Hebei, Shanxi, Shandong, Henan, Xinjiang, Jiangsu, Hunan, Guangdong).

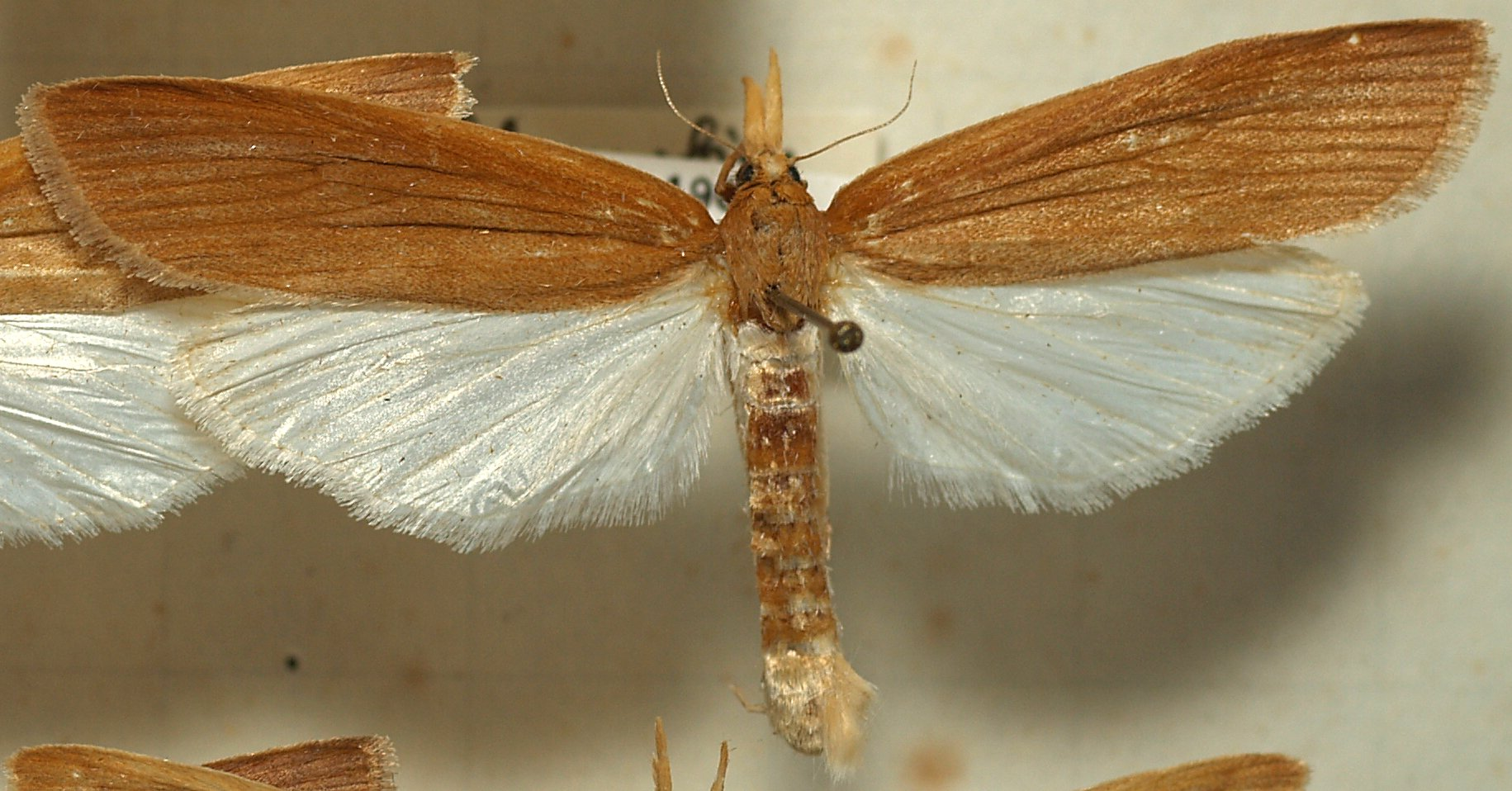
Mounted adult

The wingspan is 25–30 mm for the males and 41–46 mm for the females. The moth flies from June to August depending on the location.

The larvae feed on Phragmites species and Glyceria maxima.
