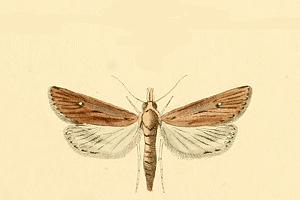

Scientific classification
- Kingdom: Animalia
- Phylum: Arthropoda
- Clade: Pancrustacea
- Class: Insecta
- Order: Lepidoptera
- Family: Crambidae
- Genus: Donacaula
- Species: D. niloticus

Binomial name
- Donacaula niloticus (Zeller, 1867)

Synonyms
- Schoenobius niloticus Zeller, 1867; Donacaula nilotica; Schoenobius niloticus alpherakii Staudinger, 1874; Schoenobius alpherakii f. nigrolineata Popescu-Gorj & Draghia, 1968; Schoenobius argophthalmus Meyrick, 1933; Schoenobius niloticus vescerellus Chrétien, 1910

= Donacaula niloticus =

Species of moth

Donacaula niloticus is a species of moth in the family Crambidae. It is found in Bulgaria, Romania, Greece, China (Gansu), Turkey, Russia, India and North Africa, including Algeria and Egypt.

The forewings are luteous yellow with black spots and a white spot surrounded with black on the transverse vein. The hindwings are whitish with a transverse row of brownish spots posteriorly.
