= Donacaula phaeopastalis =

Scientific classification
- Kingdom: Animalia
- Phylum: Arthropoda
- Clade: Pancrustacea
- Class: Insecta
- Order: Lepidoptera
- Family: Crambidae
- Genus: Donacaula
- Species: D. phaeopastalis

Binomial name
- Donacaula phaeopastalis (Hampson, 1919)

Synonyms
- Schoenobius phaeopastalis Hampson, 1919

Species of moth

Donacaula phaeopastalis is a moth in the family Crambidae. It was described by George Hampson in 1919. It is found in South Africa.
