= Donacaula dodatellus =

Scientific classification
- Kingdom: Animalia
- Phylum: Arthropoda
- Class: Insecta
- Order: Lepidoptera
- Family: Crambidae
- Genus: Donacaula
- Species: D. dodatellus

Binomial name
- Donacaula dodatellus (Walker, 1864)

Synonyms
- Chilo dodatellus Walker, 1864; Schoenobius dodatellus; Schoenobius fulvitinctalis Hampson, 1919; Schoenobius ochraceellus Snellen, 1880; Chilo aditellus Walker, 1864

Species of moth

Donacaula dodatellus is a moth in the family Crambidae. It was described by Francis Walker in 1864. It is found in China (Yunnan), Japan, India, Myanmar, Sri Lanka, the Philippines and on Sumatra.

== Description ==
The wingspan of the male is about 24 mm. Palpi with second joint about three times the length of the head. In the male, the head and thorax are ochreous, suffused with copper red. Abdomen ochreous. Forewings ochreous, thickly streaked with copper red. The costal area fuscous to near apex. A diffused fuscous streak found on median nervure and vein 5, which bent up to apex. Two black spots found on discocellulars. There is a speck at origin of vein 2 and three specks on vein 1. A marginal black specks series is present. Hindwings are whitish.
