= Schoenobius sagitella =

Scientific classification
- Kingdom: Animalia
- Phylum: Arthropoda
- Class: Insecta
- Order: Lepidoptera
- Family: Crambidae
- Genus: Schoenobius
- Species: S. sagitella

Binomial name
- Schoenobius sagitella (Hampson, 1896)

Synonyms
- Platytes sagitella Hampson, 1896

Species of moth

Schoenobius sagitella is a moth in the family Crambidae. It was described by George Hampson in 1896. It is found in Brazil.
