= Donacaula uxorialis =

Scientific classification
- Kingdom: Animalia
- Phylum: Arthropoda
- Class: Insecta
- Order: Lepidoptera
- Family: Crambidae
- Genus: Donacaula
- Species: D. uxorialis

Binomial name
- Donacaula uxorialis (Dyar, 1921)

Synonyms
- Schoenobius uxorialis Dyar, 1921

Species of moth

Donacaula uxorialis is a moth in the family Crambidae. It was described by Harrison Gray Dyar Jr. in 1921. It is found in North America, where it has been recorded from Florida and Texas.

Adults have been recorded on wing from January to October.
