= Donacaula semifuscalis =

Scientific classification
- Kingdom: Animalia
- Phylum: Arthropoda
- Class: Insecta
- Order: Lepidoptera
- Family: Crambidae
- Genus: Donacaula
- Species: D. semifuscalis

Binomial name
- Donacaula semifuscalis (Hampson, 1919)

Synonyms
- Schoenobius semifuscalis Hampson, 1919

Species of moth

Donacaula semifuscalis is a moth in the family Crambidae. It was described by George Hampson in 1919. It is found in the Brazilian states of Mato Grosso and Pernambuco and in Bolivia.
