= Donacaula tripunctellus =

Scientific classification
- Domain: Eukaryota
- Kingdom: Animalia
- Phylum: Arthropoda
- Class: Insecta
- Order: Lepidoptera
- Family: Crambidae
- Genus: Donacaula
- Species: D. tripunctellus

Binomial name
- Donacaula tripunctellus (Robinson, 1870)

Synonyms
- Schoenobius tripunctellus Robinson, 1870; Donacaula tripunctella

Species of moth

Donacaula tripunctellus is a moth in the family Crambidae. It was described by Robinson in 1870. It is found in North America, where it has been recorded from Arkansas, Florida, Louisiana, Mississippi, Oklahoma and Texas.

The length of the forewings is 20–25 mm. Adults have been recorded on wing in January, from April to September and in November.
