= Schoenobius molybdoplecta =

Scientific classification
- Kingdom: Animalia
- Phylum: Arthropoda
- Class: Insecta
- Order: Lepidoptera
- Family: Crambidae
- Genus: Schoenobius
- Species: S. molybdoplecta

Binomial name
- Schoenobius molybdoplecta (Dyar, 1914)

Synonyms
- Argyria molybdoplecta Dyar, 1914

Species of moth

Schoenobius molybdoplecta is a moth in the family Crambidae. It was described by Harrison Gray Dyar Jr. in 1914. It is found in Panama.

The wingspan is 14–24 mm. The forewings are dark grey, the inner area shaded with dull yellow. The hindwings are whitish, shading to fuscous at the margin.
