= Schoenobius scirpus =

Scientific classification
- Kingdom: Animalia
- Phylum: Arthropoda
- Clade: Pancrustacea
- Class: Insecta
- Order: Lepidoptera
- Family: Crambidae
- Genus: Schoenobius
- Species: S. scirpus

Binomial name
- Schoenobius scirpus Chen & Wu, 2014

Species of moth

Schoenobius scirpus is a moth in the family Crambidae. It was described by Fu-Qiang Chen and Chun-Sheng Wu in 2014. It is found in Guangxi, China.

The larvae feed on Scirpus grossus.

== Etymology ==
The species name refers to the genus name of the host plant.
