= Schoenobius vittatalis =

Scientific classification
- Kingdom: Animalia
- Phylum: Arthropoda
- Class: Insecta
- Order: Lepidoptera
- Family: Crambidae
- Genus: Schoenobius
- Species: S. vittatalis

Binomial name
- Schoenobius vittatalis (Hampson, 1919)

Synonyms
- Argyria vittatalis Hampson, 1919

Species of moth

Schoenobius vittatalis is a moth in the family Crambidae. It was described by George Hampson in 1919. It is found in São Paulo in Brazil and in Paraguay.

The wingspan is 32–36 mm. The forewings are cupreous brown. The hindwings are pale cupreous brown. There is a dark terminal line.
