= Schoenobius flava =

Scientific classification
- Domain: Eukaryota
- Kingdom: Animalia
- Phylum: Arthropoda
- Class: Insecta
- Order: Lepidoptera
- Family: Crambidae
- Genus: Schoenobius
- Species: S. flava

Binomial name
- Schoenobius flava (de Joannis, 1930)

Synonyms
- Scirpophaga flava de Joannis, 1930; Scirpophaga flavus; Schoenobius flavus

Species of moth

Schoenobius flava is a moth in the family Crambidae. It was described by Joseph de Joannis in 1930. It is found in Vietnam.
