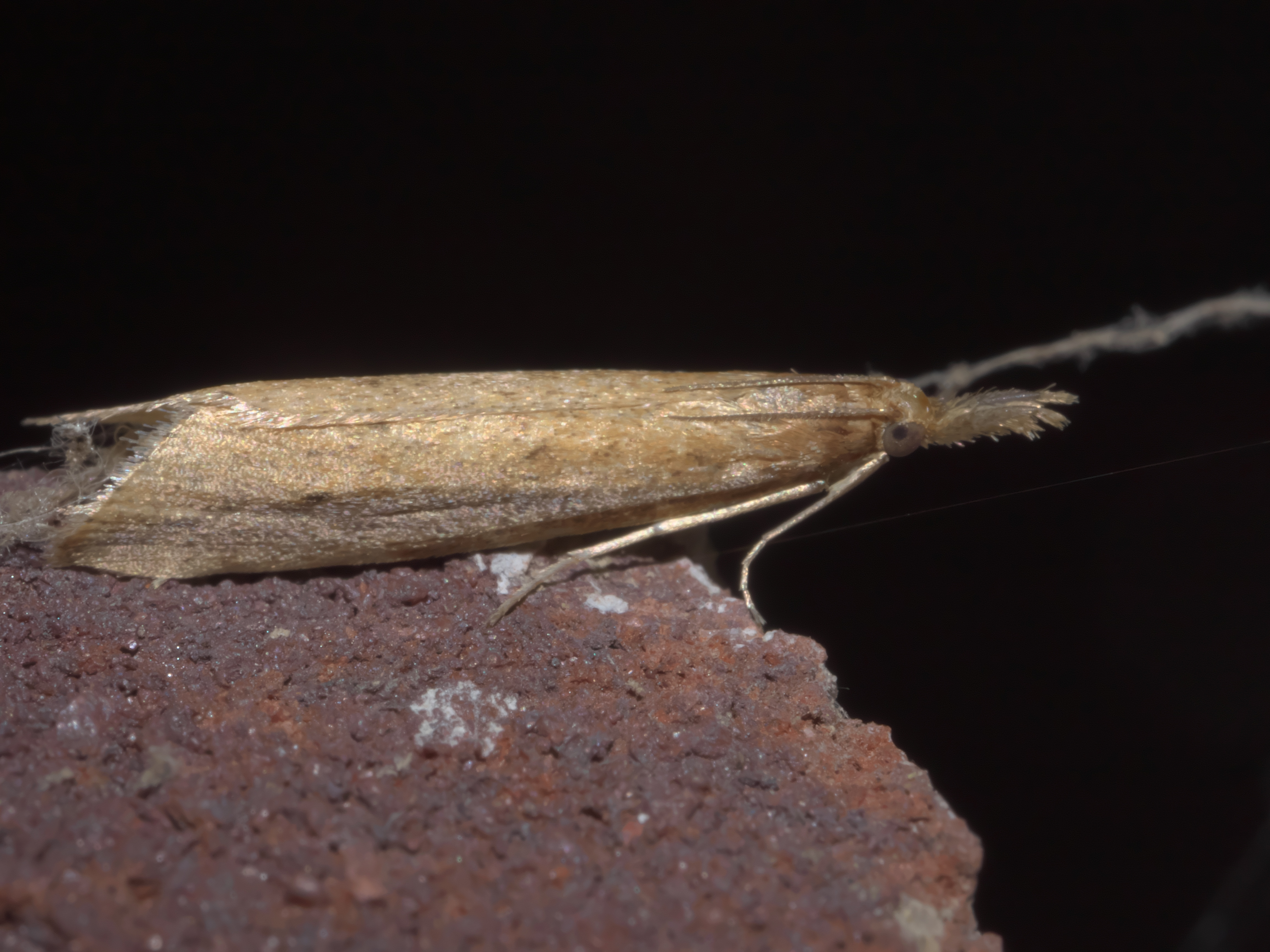

Scientific classification
- Kingdom: Animalia
- Phylum: Arthropoda
- Clade: Pancrustacea
- Class: Insecta
- Order: Lepidoptera
- Family: Crambidae
- Subfamily: Schoenobiinae
- Genus: Donacaula; Meyrick, 1890

Type species
- Tinea mucronella Denis & Schiffermüller, 1775

= Donacaula =

Genus of moths

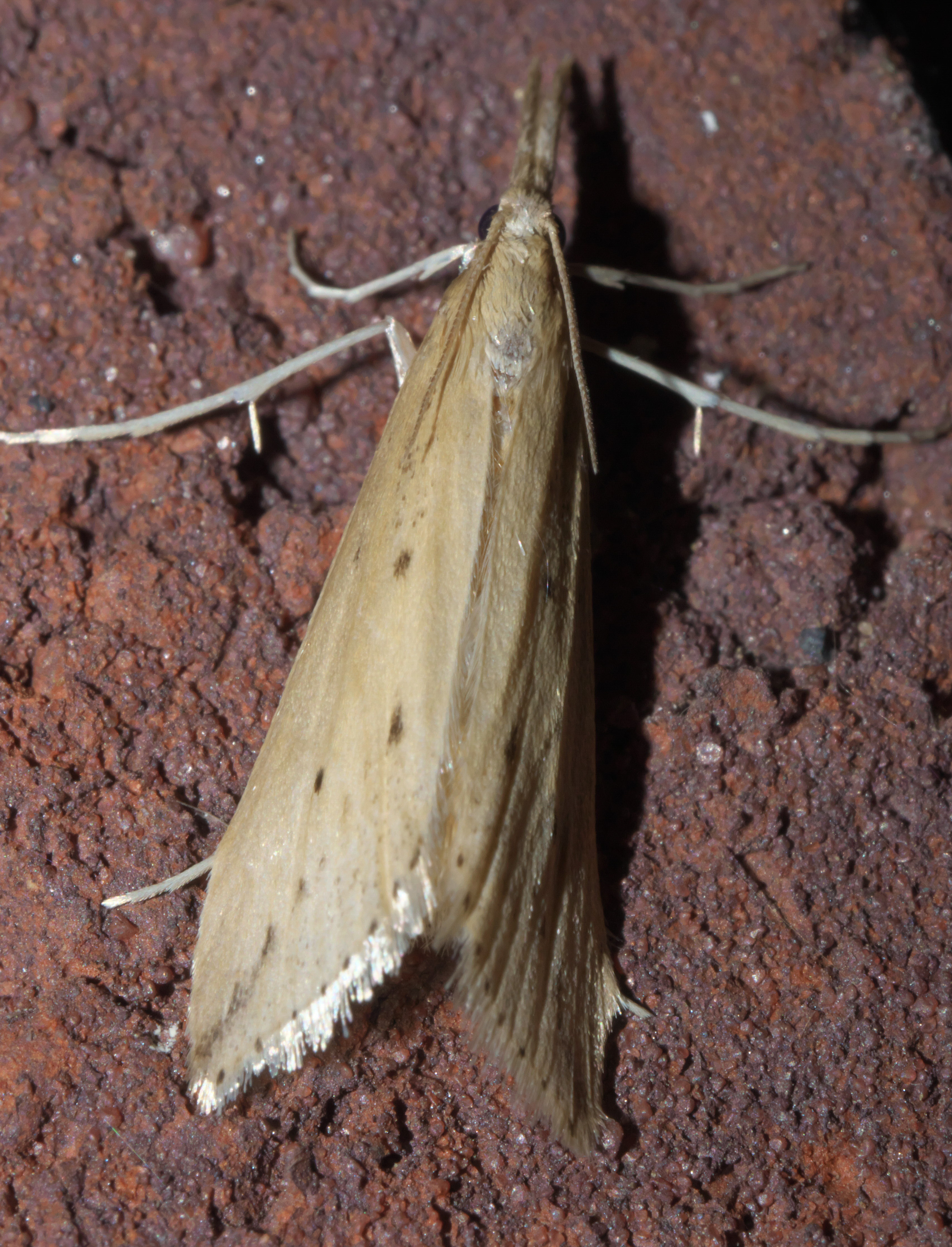
Donacaula

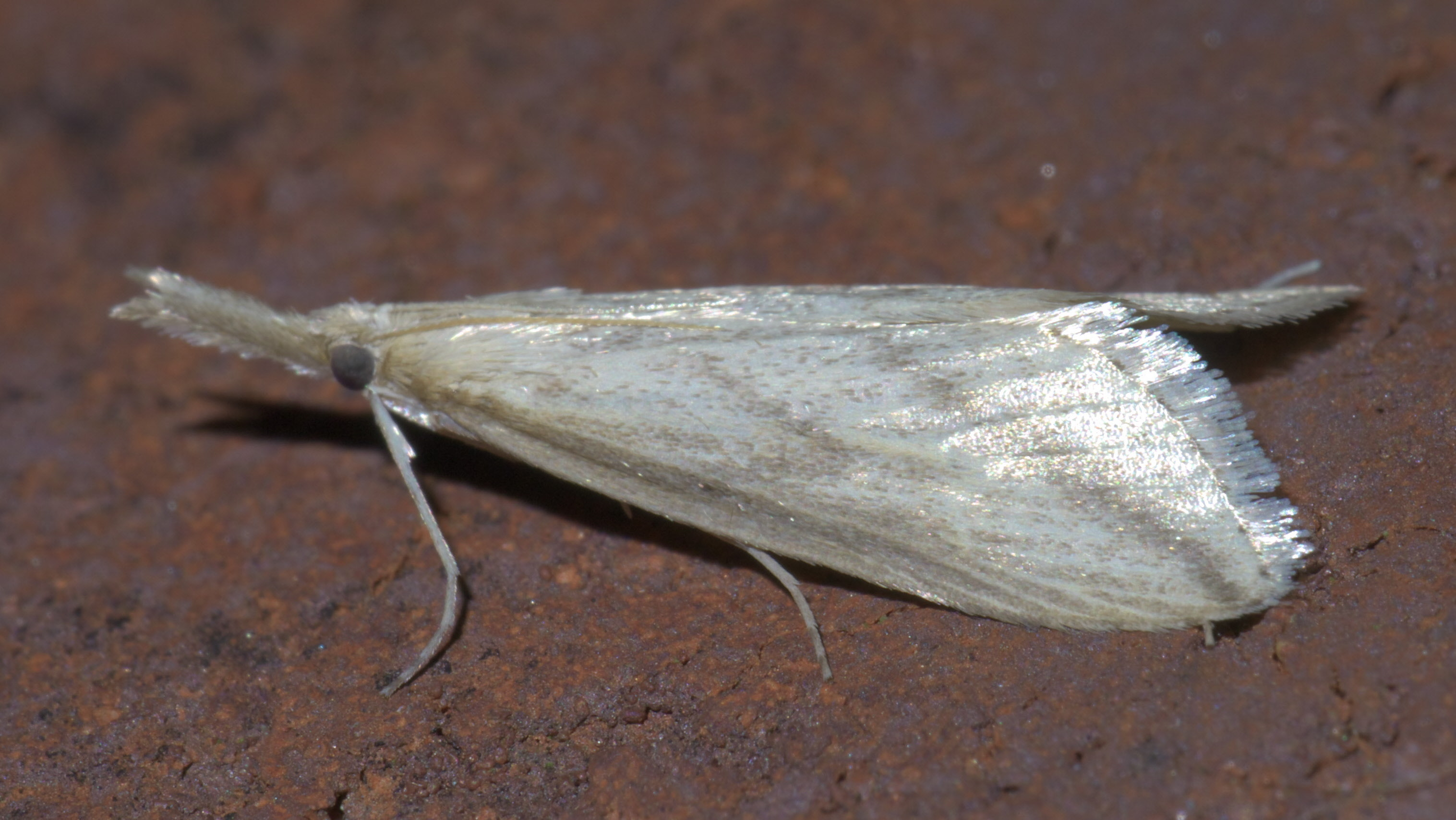
Donacaula

Donacaula is a genus of moths of the family Crambidae. The genus was erected by Edward Meyrick in 1890.

Four species of this genus are represented in the Palearctic region, four species in Africa, two species in the Oriental region, seven species in the Neotropical region and twenty-one in the Nearctic region.

== Species ==
- Donacaula albicostella (Fernald, 1888)
- Donacaula aquilellus Clemens, 1860
- Donacaula caminarius (Zeller) (Ethiopian region)
- Donacaula dispersella Robinson
- Donacaula dodatellus (Walker, 1864) (Oriental)
- Donacaula flavus de Joannis, 1929 (Oriental)
- Donacaula forficella (Thunberg, 1794) (Palearctic)
- Donacaula hasegawai (Shibuya, 1927) (Palearctic)
- Donacaula ignitalis (Hampson, 1919) (Ethiopian region)
- Donacaula immanis (Zeller, 1877) (Neotropical)
- Donacaula longirostrallus (Clemens, 1860)
- Donacaula maximellus (Fernald, 1891)
- Donacaula melinella Clemens, 1860
- Donacaula microforficellus (Amsel, 1956) (Neotropical)
- Donacaula montivagellus (Zeller, 1863) (Neotropical)
- Donacaula mucronella (Denis & Schiffermüller, 1775) (Palearctic)
- Donacaula niloticus (Zeller, 1867) (Palearctic)
- Donacaula nitidellus (Dyar, 1917)
- Donacaula pallulellus (Barnes & McDunnough, 1912)
- Donacaula phaeopastalis (Hampson, 1919) (Ethiopian region)
- Donacaula porrectellus (Walker, 1863) (Neotropical)
- Donacaula pulverealis (Hampson, 1919) (Neotropical)
- Donacaula roscidellus (Dyar, 1917)
- Donacaula rufalis (Hampson, 1919) (Ethiopian region)
- Donacaula semifuscalis (Hampson, 1919) (Neotropical)
- Donacaula sicarius (Zeller, 1863)
- Donacaula sordidellus (Zincken, 1821)
- Donacaula tripunctellus (Robinson, 1870)
- Donacaula unipunctellus (Robinson, 1870)
- Donacaula uxorialis (Dyar, 1921)

== Former species ==
- Donacaula amblyptepennis (Dyar, 1917)
- Donacaula bicolorellus (F. Hoffmann, 1934)
- Donacaula lanceolellus (Hampson, 1895)

== Unpublished species ==
The species below were described in an unpublished doctoral dissertation by Edda Lis Martínez in 2010.

- Donacaula flavusella
- Donacaula linealis
- Donacaula luridusella
- Donacaula microlinealis
- Donacaula ochronella
- Donacaula parealis
- Donacaula quadrisella
- Donacaula ravella
- Donacaula sinusella
- Donacaula tannisella
