= Schoenobius irrorata =

Scientific classification
- Kingdom: Animalia
- Phylum: Arthropoda
- Clade: Pancrustacea
- Class: Insecta
- Order: Lepidoptera
- Family: Crambidae
- Genus: Schoenobius
- Species: S. irrorata

Binomial name
- Schoenobius irrorata (Hampson, 1919)

Synonyms
- Topeutis irrorata Hampson, 1919; Schoenobius irroratus

Species of moth

Schoenobius irrorata is a moth in the family Crambidae. It was described by George Hampson in 1919. It is found in Paraná, Brazil.

The wingspan is 12–16 mm. The forewings are ochreous, tinged with red brown and irrorated (speckled) with dark brown and with a brown costal edge. The subterminal line is brownish and the termen is more strongly tinged with brown. The hindwings are silvery white with a subterminal series of reddish-brown spots and a terminal series of more distinct spots.
