= Schoenobius endochalybella =

Scientific classification
- Kingdom: Animalia
- Phylum: Arthropoda
- Class: Insecta
- Order: Lepidoptera
- Family: Crambidae
- Genus: Schoenobius
- Species: S. endochalybella

Binomial name
- Schoenobius endochalybella (Hampson, 1896)

Synonyms
- Platytes endochalybella Hampson, 1896

Species of moth

Schoenobius endochalybella is a moth in the family Crambidae. It was described by George Hampson in 1896. It is found in Paraná, Brazil.

The wingspan is 26 mm. The forewings are dark vinous brown, the inner area is golden bronze with two small brown and white lunules at the middle. There is a pale white-edged triangular mark beyond the lower angle of the cell, as well as a white marginal band. The hindwings are pale, the apical area is tinged with fuscous. There is a fuscous submarginal line.
