= Donacaula maximellus =

Scientific classification
- Domain: Eukaryota
- Kingdom: Animalia
- Phylum: Arthropoda
- Class: Insecta
- Order: Lepidoptera
- Family: Crambidae
- Genus: Donacaula
- Species: D. maximellus

Binomial name
- Donacaula maximellus (Fernald, 1891)

Synonyms
- Schoenobius maximellus Fernald, 1891; Donacaula maximella

Species of moth

Donacaula maximellus is a moth in the family Crambidae. It was described by Charles H. Fernald in 1891. It is found in North America, where it has been recorded from Florida, Georgia, Louisiana, Mississippi, Nebraska, North Carolina and South Carolina.

Adults have been recorded year round.

Larvae have been recorded feeding on Zizaniopsis miliacea.
