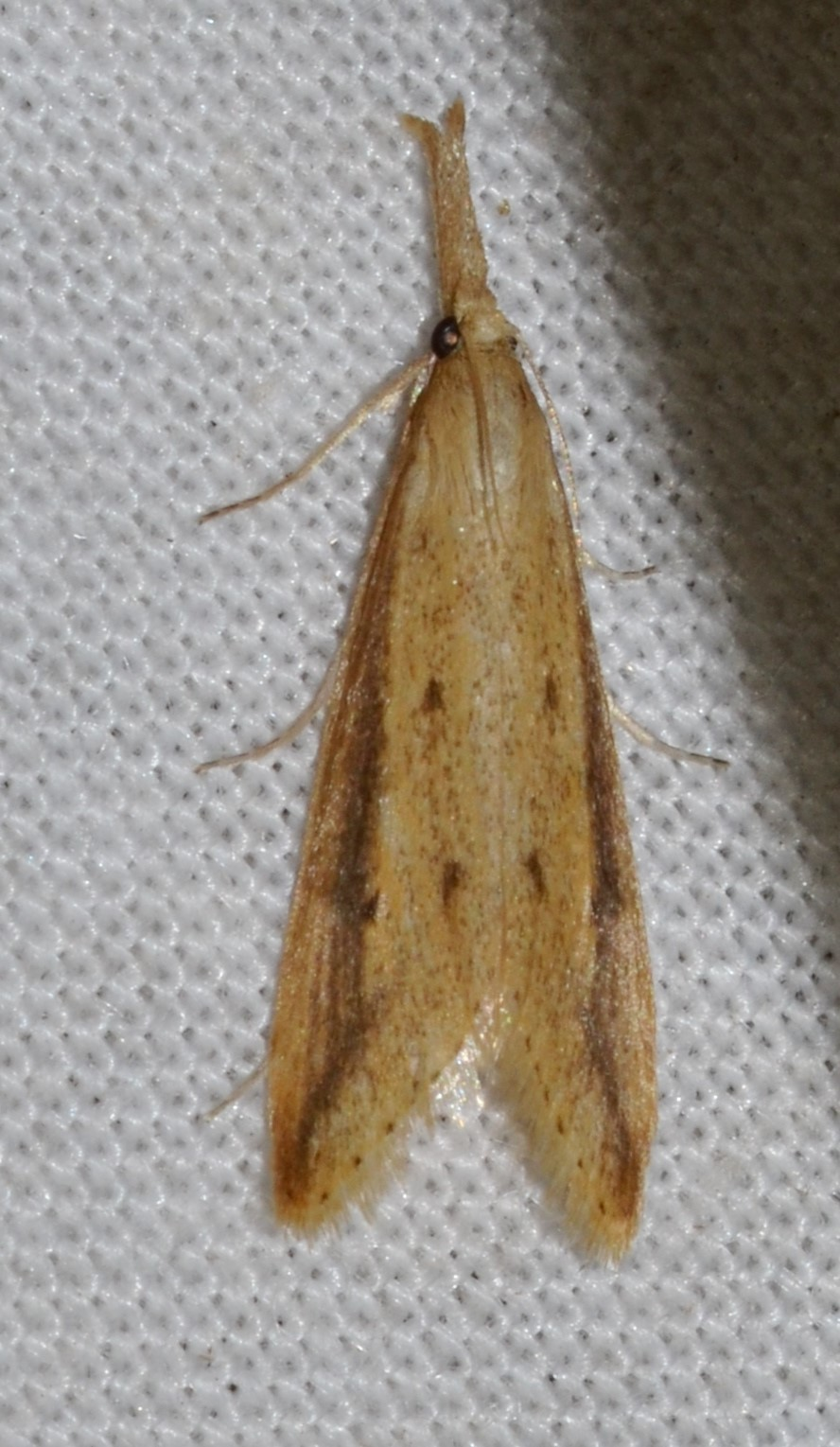

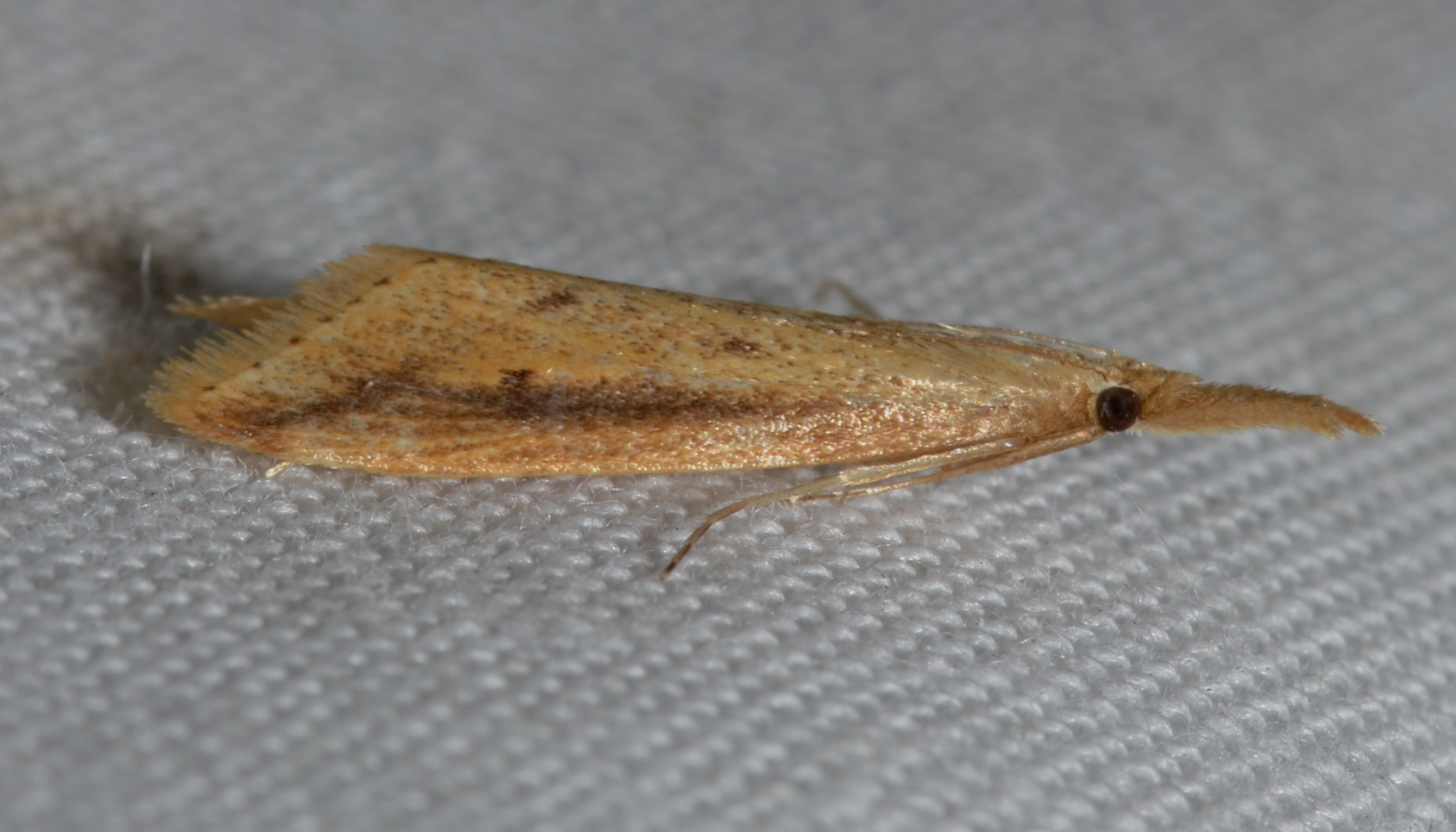

Scientific classification
- Kingdom: Animalia
- Phylum: Arthropoda
- Clade: Pancrustacea
- Class: Insecta
- Order: Lepidoptera
- Family: Crambidae
- Genus: Donacaula
- Species: D. melinella

Binomial name
- Donacaula melinella Clemens, 1860

Synonyms
- Chilo melinellus Clemens, 1861; Schoenobius melinellus

= Donacaula melinella =

Species of moth

Donacaula melinella is a moth in the family Crambidae. It was described by James Brackenridge Clemens in 1860. It is found in North America, where it has been recorded from Ontario, Alabama, Arizona, Arkansas, Connecticut, Delaware, Florida, Georgia, Illinois, Indiana, Kentucky, Louisiana, Maine, Maryland, Massachusetts, Michigan, Mississippi, Nebraska, New Jersey, New York, North Carolina, Pennsylvania, South Carolina, Texas and Virginia.

The length of the forewings is 21–34 mm. The main flight period is March to August, although adults have been recorded in most months.
