= Donacaula nitidellus =

Scientific classification
- Kingdom: Animalia
- Phylum: Arthropoda
- Class: Insecta
- Order: Lepidoptera
- Family: Crambidae
- Genus: Donacaula
- Species: D. nitidellus

Binomial name
- Donacaula nitidellus (Dyar, 1917)

Synonyms
- Schoenobius nitidella Dyar, 1917; Donacaula nitidella

Species of moth

Donacaula nitidellus is a moth in the family Crambidae. It was described by Harrison Gray Dyar Jr. in 1917. It is found in North America, where it has been recorded from Alberta, Alabama, Connecticut, Georgia, Maryland, Massachusetts, Mississippi, New Jersey, New York, North Carolina, South Carolina and Texas.

The length of the forewings is 22–39 mm. The forewings are greyish beige. The hindwings of the males are yellowish grey, sometimes with a longitudinal grey line. The female hindwings are yellowish white, always without the grey line. Adults have been recorded on wing from April to December.
