= Schoenobius endochralis =

Scientific classification
- Kingdom: Animalia
- Phylum: Arthropoda
- Class: Insecta
- Order: Lepidoptera
- Family: Crambidae
- Genus: Schoenobius
- Species: S. endochralis

Binomial name
- Schoenobius endochralis (Hampson, 1919)

Synonyms
- Argyria endochralis Hampson, 1919

Species of moth

Schoenobius endochralis is a moth in the family Crambidae. It was described by George Hampson in 1919. It is found in Argentina.

The wingspan is 36 mm. The forewings are pale rufous. The hindwings are whitish, tinged with rufous. There is a fine brown terminal line.
