= Donacaula caminarius =

Scientific classification
- Kingdom: Animalia
- Phylum: Arthropoda
- Clade: Pancrustacea
- Class: Insecta
- Order: Lepidoptera
- Family: Crambidae
- Genus: Donacaula
- Species: D. caminarius

Binomial name
- Donacaula caminarius (Zeller, 1852)

Synonyms
- Schoenobius caminarius Zeller, 1852

Species of insect

Donacaula caminarius is a moth in the family Crambidae. It was described by Zeller in 1852. It is found in South Africa.
