= Donacaula ignitalis =

Scientific classification
- Kingdom: Animalia
- Phylum: Arthropoda
- Class: Insecta
- Order: Lepidoptera
- Family: Crambidae
- Genus: Donacaula
- Species: D. ignitalis

Binomial name
- Donacaula ignitalis (Hampson, 1919)

Synonyms
- Schoenobius ignitalis Hampson, 1919

Species of moth

Donacaula ignitalis is a moth in the family Crambidae. It was described by George Hampson in 1919. It is found in South Africa.
