= Donacaula hasegawai =

Scientific classification
- Domain: Eukaryota
- Kingdom: Animalia
- Phylum: Arthropoda
- Class: Insecta
- Order: Lepidoptera
- Family: Crambidae
- Genus: Donacaula
- Species: D. hasegawai

Binomial name
- Donacaula hasegawai (Shibuya, 1927)

Synonyms
- Schoenobius hasegawai Shibuya, 1927

Species of moth

Donacaula hasegawai is a moth in the family Crambidae. It was described by Shibuya in 1927. It is found in Korea.
