= Ancylolomia cervicella =

Scientific classification
- Kingdom: Animalia
- Phylum: Arthropoda
- Clade: Pancrustacea
- Class: Insecta
- Order: Lepidoptera
- Family: Crambidae
- Subfamily: Crambinae
- Tribe: Ancylolomiini
- Genus: Ancylolomia
- Species: A. cervicella

Binomial name
- Ancylolomia cervicella Błeszyński, 1970

Species of moth

Ancylolomia cervicella, the Bright grass-moth is a moth in the family Crambidae. It was described by Stanisław Błeszyński in 1970. It is found in India and Sri Lanka. It is externally similar to Ancylolomia felderella, having a reddish-brown but is distinguishable by its bright white stripe. It is similar to Ancylolomia argentata, but less red in shade, and has a black instead of silver streak on the lower forewing. It also varies in distribution, being found in India.
