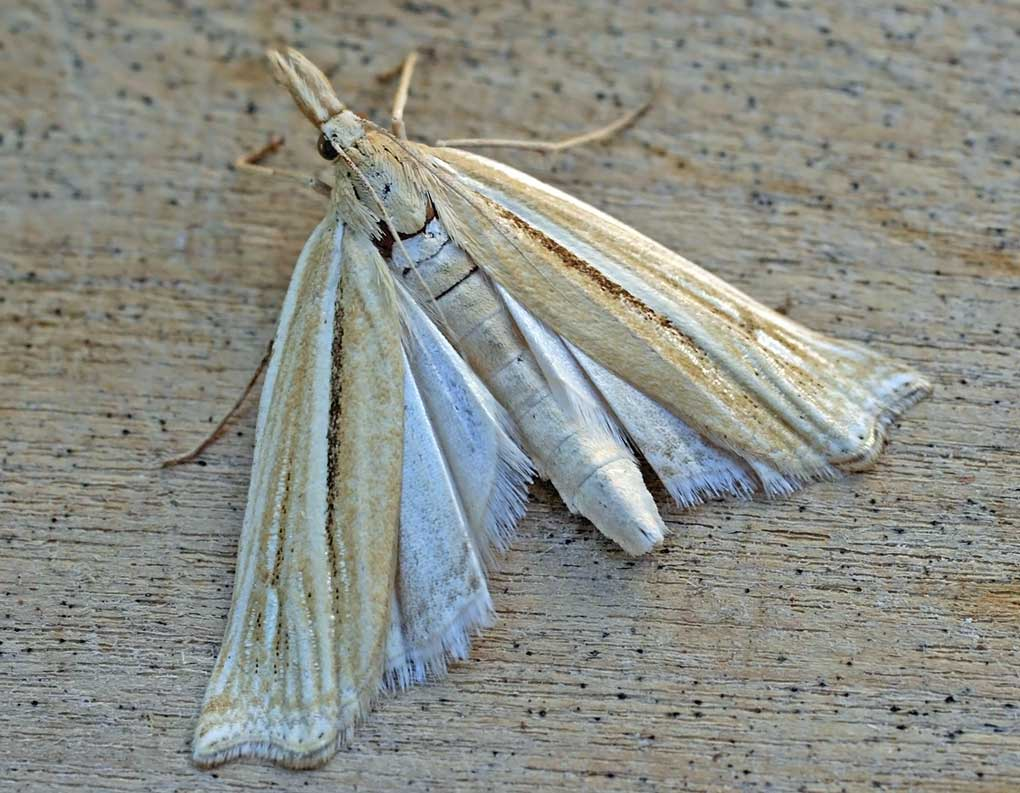
- Ancylolomia tentaculella

Scientific classification
- Domain: Eukaryota
- Kingdom: Animalia
- Phylum: Arthropoda
- Class: Insecta
- Order: Lepidoptera
- Family: Crambidae
- Subfamily: Crambinae
- Tribe: Ancylolomiini
- Genus: Ancylolomia; Hübner, 1825

Synonyms
- Acylolomia Hampson, 1919; Jartheza Walker, 1863; Pseudoctenella Strand, 1907; Ctenus Mabille, 1906; Tollia Amsel, 1949

= Ancylolomia =

Genus of moths

Ancylolomia is a genus of moths of the family Crambidae described by Jacob Hübner in 1825.

== Description ==
Palpi porrect (stretched forward), thickly clothed with hair, and extending about three times the length of head. Maxillary palp triangularly scaled. Frons oblique. Abdomen long. Tibia with outer spurs about two-thirds lengths of inner. Forewings long and narrow. The rounded apex. The outer margin excised below apex, then excurved. Veins 3, 4 and 5 from angle of cell and veins 7, 8 and 9 stalked. Vein 10 free and vein 11 becoming coincident with vein 12. Hindwings with vein 3 from close to angle of cell. Veins 4 and 5 from angle or stalked. Vein 6 from above middle of discocellulars and obsolescent. Vein 7 anastomosing (fused together) with vein 8.

== Species ==
- Ancylolomia aduncella Wang & Sung, 1981
- Ancylolomia agraphella Hampson, 1919
- Ancylolomia albicostalis Hampson, 1919
- Ancylolomia arabella Błeszyński, 1965
- Ancylolomia argentata Moore, 1885
- Ancylolomia argenteovittata Aurivillius, 1910
- Ancylolomia atrifasciata Hampson, 1919
- Ancylolomia auripaleella Marion, 1954
- Ancylolomia caffra Zeller, 1877
- Ancylolomia capensis Zeller, 1852
- Ancylolomia carcinella Wang & Sung, 1981
- Ancylolomia castaneata Hampson, 1919
- Ancylolomia cervicella Błeszyński, 1970
- Ancylolomia chrysargyria Hampson, 1919
- Ancylolomia chrysographellus (Kollar & Redtenbacher, 1844)
- Ancylolomia claudia Bassi, 2013
- Ancylolomia croesus Hampson, 1919
- Ancylolomia disparalis Hübner, 1825
- Ancylolomia dives Hampson, 1919
- Ancylolomia drosogramma Meyrick, 1936
- Ancylolomia elisa Bassi, 2013
- Ancylolomia elongata D. Lucas, 1917
- Ancylolomia endophaealis Hampson, 1910
- Ancylolomia felderella Błeszyński, 1970
- Ancylolomia fulvitinctalis Hampson, 1919
- Ancylolomia gracilis Fawcett, 1918
- Ancylolomia hamatella Wang & Sung, 1981
- Ancylolomia holochrea Hampson, 1919
- Ancylolomia indica C. Felder, R. Felder & Rogenhofer, 1875
- Ancylolomia inornata Staudinger, 1870
- Ancylolomia intricata Błeszyński, 1970
- Ancylolomia irrorata Hampson, 1919
- Ancylolomia jacquelinae Rougeot, 1984
- Ancylolomia japonica Zeller, 1877
- Ancylolomia kuznetzovi Błeszyński, 1965
- Ancylolomia laverna Błeszyński, 1970
- Ancylolomia lentifascialis Hampson, 1919
- Ancylolomia likiangella Błeszyński, 1970
- Ancylolomia locupletellus (Kollar & Redtenbacher, 1844)
- Ancylolomia longicorniella Song & Chen in Chen, Song, Yuan & Zhang, 2004
- Ancylolomia melanella Hampson, 1919
- Ancylolomia melanothoracia Hampson, 1919
- Ancylolomia micropalpella Amsel, 1951
- Ancylolomia minutella Turati, 1926
- Ancylolomia mirabilis Wallengren, 1876
- Ancylolomia nigrifasciata Bassi, 2004
- Ancylolomia obscurella de Joannis, 1927
- Ancylolomia obstitella (Swinhoe, 1886)
- Ancylolomia ophiralis Hampson, 1919
- Ancylolomia orchidea Błeszyński, 1970
- Ancylolomia palpella (Denis & Schiffermüller, 1775)
- Ancylolomia paraetoniella Turati, 1924
- Ancylolomia parentii Bassi in Bassi & Trematerra, 2014
- Ancylolomia pectinatellus (Zeller, 1847)
- Ancylolomia pectinifera Hampson, 1910
- Ancylolomia perfasciata Hampson, 1919
- Ancylolomia planicosta E. L. Martin, 1956
- Ancylolomia prepiella Hampson, 1919
- Ancylolomia punctistrigellus (Mabille, 1880)
- Ancylolomia rotaxella Błeszyński, 1965
- Ancylolomia saharae P. Leraut, 2012
- Ancylolomia sansibarica Zeller, 1877
- Ancylolomia saundersiella Zeller, 1863
- Ancylolomia shafferi Rougeot, 1977
- Ancylolomia shefferialis Rougeot, 1984
- Ancylolomia simplella de Joannis, 1913
- Ancylolomia taprobanensis Zeller, 1863
- Ancylolomia tentaculella (Hübner, 1796)
- Ancylolomia tripolitella Rebel, 1909
- Ancylolomia tripunctalis Maes, 2011
- Ancylolomia umbonella Wang & Sung, 1981
- Ancylolomia uniformella Hampson, 1896
- Ancylolomia westwoodi Zeller, 1863
