= Ancylolomia gracilis =

Scientific classification
- Kingdom: Animalia
- Phylum: Arthropoda
- Clade: Pancrustacea
- Class: Insecta
- Order: Lepidoptera
- Family: Crambidae
- Subfamily: Crambinae
- Tribe: Ancylolomiini
- Genus: Ancylolomia
- Species: A. gracilis

Binomial name
- Ancylolomia gracilis Fawcett, 1918

Synonyms
- Ancylolomia urruna Strand, 1920; Ancylolomia stenochta Błeszyński & Collins, 1962

Species of moth

Ancylolomia gracilis is a moth in the family Crambidae. It was described by James Farish Malcolm Fawcett in 1918. It is found in the Democratic Republic of the Congo, Ethiopia, Kenya and Rwanda.

== Subspecies ==
- Ancylolomia gracilis gracilis
- Ancylolomia gracilis stenochtha Meyrick, 1934 (Democratic Republic of the Congo)
