= Ancylolomia laverna =

Scientific classification
- Kingdom: Animalia
- Phylum: Arthropoda
- Clade: Pancrustacea
- Class: Insecta
- Order: Lepidoptera
- Family: Crambidae
- Subfamily: Crambinae
- Tribe: Ancylolomiini
- Genus: Ancylolomia
- Species: A. laverna

Binomial name
- Ancylolomia laverna Błeszyński, 1970

Species of moth

Ancylolomia laverna is a moth in the genus Ancylolomia in the family Crambidae. It was described by Stanisław Błeszyński in 1970. It is found in Myanmar.
