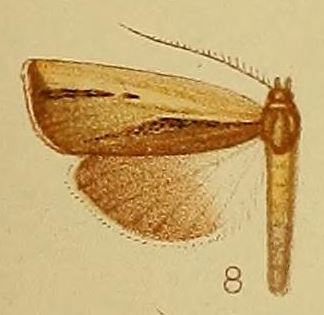

Scientific classification
- Kingdom: Animalia
- Phylum: Arthropoda
- Clade: Pancrustacea
- Class: Insecta
- Order: Lepidoptera
- Family: Crambidae
- Subfamily: Crambinae
- Tribe: Ancylolomiini
- Genus: Ancylolomia
- Species: A. endophaealis

Binomial name
- Ancylolomia endophaealis Hampson, 1910

= Ancylolomia endophaealis =

Species of moth

Ancylolomia endophaealis is a moth in the family Crambidae. It was described by George Hampson in 1910. It is found in the Democratic Republic of the Congo.
