= Ancylolomia obstitella =

Scientific classification
- Kingdom: Animalia
- Phylum: Arthropoda
- Clade: Pancrustacea
- Class: Insecta
- Order: Lepidoptera
- Family: Crambidae
- Subfamily: Crambinae
- Tribe: Ancylolomiini
- Genus: Ancylolomia
- Species: A. obstitella

Binomial name
- Ancylolomia obstitella (C. Swinhoe, 1886)

Synonyms
- Jartheza obstitella C. Swinhoe, 1886

Species of moth

Ancylolomia obstitella, the Opaque grass-moth is a moth in the family Crambidae. It was described by Charles Swinhoe in 1886. It is found in India.
