= Ancylolomia intricata =

Scientific classification
- Kingdom: Animalia
- Phylum: Arthropoda
- Clade: Pancrustacea
- Class: Insecta
- Order: Lepidoptera
- Family: Crambidae
- Subfamily: Crambinae
- Tribe: Ancylolomiini
- Genus: Ancylolomia
- Species: A. intricata

Binomial name
- Ancylolomia intricata Błeszyński, 1970

Species of moth

Ancylolomia intricata, the Intricate grass-moth is a moth in the family Crambidae. It was described by Stanisław Błeszyński in 1970. It is found in India (Assam).
