= Ancylolomia longicorniella =

Scientific classification
- Kingdom: Animalia
- Phylum: Arthropoda
- Clade: Pancrustacea
- Class: Insecta
- Order: Lepidoptera
- Family: Crambidae
- Subfamily: Crambinae
- Tribe: Ancylolomiini
- Genus: Ancylolomia
- Species: A. longicorniella

Binomial name
- Ancylolomia longicorniella Song & Chen in Chen, Song, Yuan & Zhang, 2004

Species of moth

Ancylolomia longicorniella is a moth in the family Crambidae. It was described by Shi-Mei Song and Tie-Mei Chen in 2004. It is found in China (Guangdong).
