= Ancylolomia taprobanensis =

Scientific classification
- Kingdom: Animalia
- Phylum: Arthropoda
- Clade: Pancrustacea
- Class: Insecta
- Order: Lepidoptera
- Family: Crambidae
- Subfamily: Crambinae
- Tribe: Ancylolomiini
- Genus: Ancylolomia
- Species: A. taprobanensis

Binomial name
- Ancylolomia taprobanensis Zeller, 1863

Synonyms
- Ancylolomia taprobanensis chrysanthema Bleszynski, 1970; Ancylolomia taprobanensis javae Bleszynski, 1970

Species of moth

Ancylolomia taprobanensis, the Chocolate grass-moth is a moth in the family Crambidae. It was described by Zeller in 1863. It is found in Mozambique, India and Sri Lanka, as well as on Java.
