= Ancylolomia paraetoniella =

Scientific classification
- Kingdom: Animalia
- Phylum: Arthropoda
- Clade: Pancrustacea
- Class: Insecta
- Order: Lepidoptera
- Family: Crambidae
- Subfamily: Crambinae
- Tribe: Ancylolomiini
- Genus: Ancylolomia
- Species: A. paraetoniella

Binomial name
- Ancylolomia paraetoniella Turati, 1924

Species of moth

Ancylolomia paraetoniella is a moth in the family Crambidae. It was described by Turati in 1924. It is found in Libya.
