= Ancylolomia elongata =

Scientific classification
- Kingdom: Animalia
- Phylum: Arthropoda
- Clade: Pancrustacea
- Class: Insecta
- Order: Lepidoptera
- Family: Crambidae
- Subfamily: Crambinae
- Tribe: Ancylolomiini
- Genus: Ancylolomia
- Species: A. elongata

Binomial name
- Ancylolomia elongata D. Lucas, 1917

Synonyms
- Ancylolomia nigrilinea de Joannis, 1923; Tollia (Ancylolomia) maroccana Amsel, 1951

Species of moth

Ancylolomia elongata is a moth in the family Crambidae. It was described by Daniel Lucas in 1917. It is found in North Africa, where it has been recorded from Algeria and Morocco.
