= Ancylolomia simplella =

Scientific classification
- Kingdom: Animalia
- Phylum: Arthropoda
- Clade: Pancrustacea
- Class: Insecta
- Order: Lepidoptera
- Family: Crambidae
- Subfamily: Crambinae
- Tribe: Ancylolomiini
- Genus: Ancylolomia
- Species: A. simplella

Binomial name
- Ancylolomia simplella de Joannis, 1913

Species of moth

Ancylolomia simplella is a moth in the family Crambidae. It was described by Joseph de Joannis in 1913. It is found in Eritrea, Kenya, South Africa, Zimbabwe, and Mali.
