= Ancylolomia argenteovittata =

Scientific classification
- Kingdom: Animalia
- Phylum: Arthropoda
- Clade: Pancrustacea
- Class: Insecta
- Order: Lepidoptera
- Family: Crambidae
- Subfamily: Crambinae
- Tribe: Ancylolomiini
- Genus: Ancylolomia
- Species: A. argenteovittata

Binomial name
- Ancylolomia argenteovittata Aurivillius, 1910

Species of moth

Ancylolomia argenteovittata is a moth in the family Crambidae. It was described by Per Olof Christopher Aurivillius in 1910. It is found in Ethiopia and Tanzania.
