= Ancylolomia prepiella =

Scientific classification
- Kingdom: Animalia
- Phylum: Arthropoda
- Clade: Pancrustacea
- Class: Insecta
- Order: Lepidoptera
- Family: Crambidae
- Subfamily: Crambinae
- Tribe: Ancylolomiini
- Genus: Ancylolomia
- Species: A. prepiella

Binomial name
- Ancylolomia prepiella Hampson, 1919

Species of moth

Ancylolomia prepiella is a moth in the family Crambidae. It was described by George Hampson in 1919. It is found in Lesotho and South Africa.
