= Ancylolomia kuznetzovi =

Scientific classification
- Kingdom: Animalia
- Phylum: Arthropoda
- Clade: Pancrustacea
- Class: Insecta
- Order: Lepidoptera
- Family: Crambidae
- Subfamily: Crambinae
- Tribe: Ancylolomiini
- Genus: Ancylolomia
- Species: A. kuznetzovi

Binomial name
- Ancylolomia kuznetzovi Błeszyński, 1965

Species of moth

Ancylolomia kuznetzovi is a moth in the family Crambidae. It was described by Stanisław Błeszyński in 1965. It is found in Turkmenistan.
