= Ancylolomia saharae =

Scientific classification
- Kingdom: Animalia
- Phylum: Arthropoda
- Clade: Pancrustacea
- Class: Insecta
- Order: Lepidoptera
- Family: Crambidae
- Subfamily: Crambinae
- Tribe: Ancylolomiini
- Genus: Ancylolomia
- Species: A. saharae

Binomial name
- Ancylolomia saharae Leraut, 2012

Species of moth

Ancylolomia saharae is a moth in the family Crambidae. It was described by Patrice J.A. Leraut in 2012. It is found in Mauritania.
