= Ancylolomia pectinatellus =

Scientific classification
- Kingdom: Animalia
- Phylum: Arthropoda
- Clade: Pancrustacea
- Class: Insecta
- Order: Lepidoptera
- Family: Crambidae
- Subfamily: Crambinae
- Tribe: Ancylolomiini
- Genus: Ancylolomia
- Species: A. pectinatellus

Binomial name
- Ancylolomia pectinatellus (Zeller, 1847)

Synonyms
- Crambus pectinatellus Zeller, 1847

Species of moth

Ancylolomia pectinatellus is a species of moth in the family Crambidae. It is found in Italy, Hungary, Croatia, Bulgaria, the Republic of Macedonia, Greece, Asia Minor, Syria, the Palestinian territories, Iraq and Iran.

The wingspan is about 25 mm.
