= Ancylolomia obscurella =

Scientific classification
- Kingdom: Animalia
- Phylum: Arthropoda
- Clade: Pancrustacea
- Class: Insecta
- Order: Lepidoptera
- Family: Crambidae
- Subfamily: Crambinae
- Tribe: Ancylolomiini
- Genus: Ancylolomia
- Species: A. obscurella

Binomial name
- Ancylolomia obscurella de Joannis, 1927

Synonyms
- Ancylolomia chrysographella var. obscurella de Joannis, 1927

Species of moth

Ancylolomia obscurella is a moth in the family Crambidae. It was described by Joseph de Joannis in 1927. It is found in Mozambique.
