= Ancylolomia westwoodi =

Westwood's grass-moth

Scientific classification
- Kingdom: Animalia
- Phylum: Arthropoda
- Clade: Pancrustacea
- Class: Insecta
- Order: Lepidoptera
- Family: Crambidae
- Subfamily: Crambinae
- Tribe: Ancylolomiini
- Genus: Ancylolomia
- Species: A. westwoodi

Binomial name
- Ancylolomia westwoodi Zeller, 1863

Species of moth

Ancylolomia westwoodi, the Westwood's grass-moth, is a moth in the family Crambidae. It was described by Zeller in 1863. It is found in Afghanistan, Iran, western Pakistan, India, Sri Lanka, Sulawesi, Java, Bali, Malaysia, Sumatra and Australia, where it has been recorded from the Northern Territory and Queensland. It is externally indistinguishable from Ancylolomia indica, but generally darker. A.w.bitubirosella is one of the most common Crambinae in India.

== Subspecies ==
- Ancylolomia westwoodi westwoodi (Australia)
- Ancylolomia westwoodi bitubirosella Amsel, 1959 (Afghanistan, Iran, western Pakistan, India, Sri Lanka, Sulawesi, Java, Bali, Malaysia, Sumatra)
