= Ancylolomia planicosta =

Scientific classification
- Kingdom: Animalia
- Phylum: Arthropoda
- Clade: Pancrustacea
- Class: Insecta
- Order: Lepidoptera
- Family: Crambidae
- Subfamily: Crambinae
- Tribe: Ancylolomiini
- Genus: Ancylolomia
- Species: A. planicosta

Binomial name
- Ancylolomia planicosta E. L. Martin, 1956

Species of moth

Ancylolomia planicosta is a moth in the family Crambidae. It was described by E. L. Martin in 1956. It is found in Ethiopia, Kenya, Rwanda and South Africa.
