= Ancylolomia mirabilis =

Scientific classification
- Kingdom: Animalia
- Phylum: Arthropoda
- Clade: Pancrustacea
- Class: Insecta
- Order: Lepidoptera
- Family: Crambidae
- Subfamily: Crambinae
- Tribe: Ancylolomiini
- Genus: Ancylolomia
- Species: A. mirabilis

Binomial name
- Ancylolomia mirabilis Wallengren, 1876

Species of moth

Ancylolomia mirabilis is a moth in the family Crambidae. It was described by Wallengren in 1876. It is found in South Africa.
