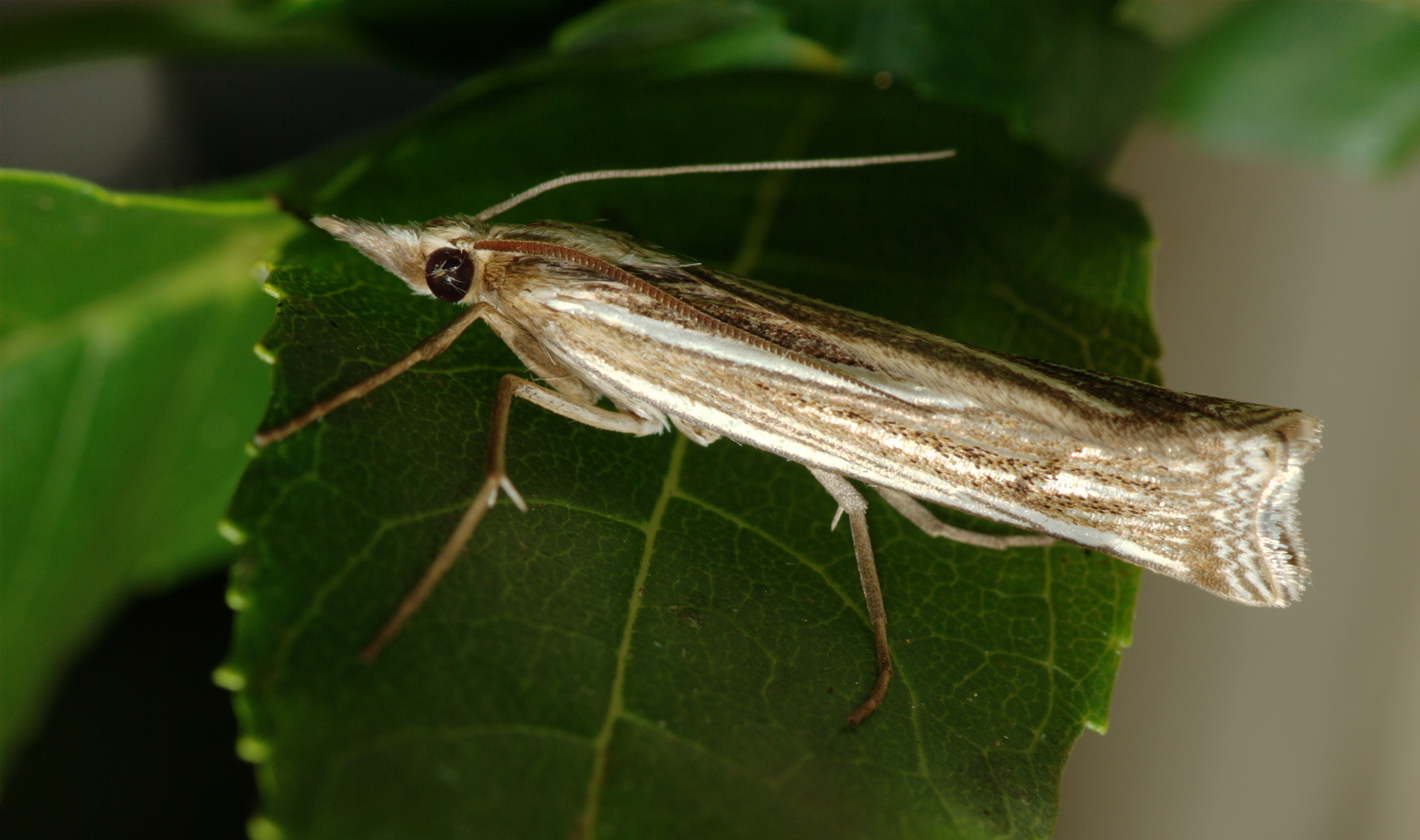

Scientific classification
- Kingdom: Animalia
- Phylum: Arthropoda
- Clade: Pancrustacea
- Class: Insecta
- Order: Lepidoptera
- Family: Crambidae
- Subfamily: Crambinae
- Tribe: Ancylolomiini
- Genus: Ancylolomia
- Species: A. tentaculella

Binomial name
- Ancylolomia tentaculella (Hübner, 1796)

Synonyms
- Tinea tentaculella Hübner, 1796; Ancylolomia irakella Amsel, 1949; Palparia tentaculea (Haworth, 1811); Ancylolomia tentalis (Hübner, [1825])

= Ancylolomia tentaculella =

Species of moth

Ancylolomia tentaculella is a species of moth of the family Crambidae found in Asia and Europe. It was first described by the German entomologist Jacob Hübner in 1796. The larvae feed on grasses.

== Distribution ==
It is found in Southern and Central Europe, Anatolia and the Middle East.

== Description ==
The wingspan is 30–34 mm.

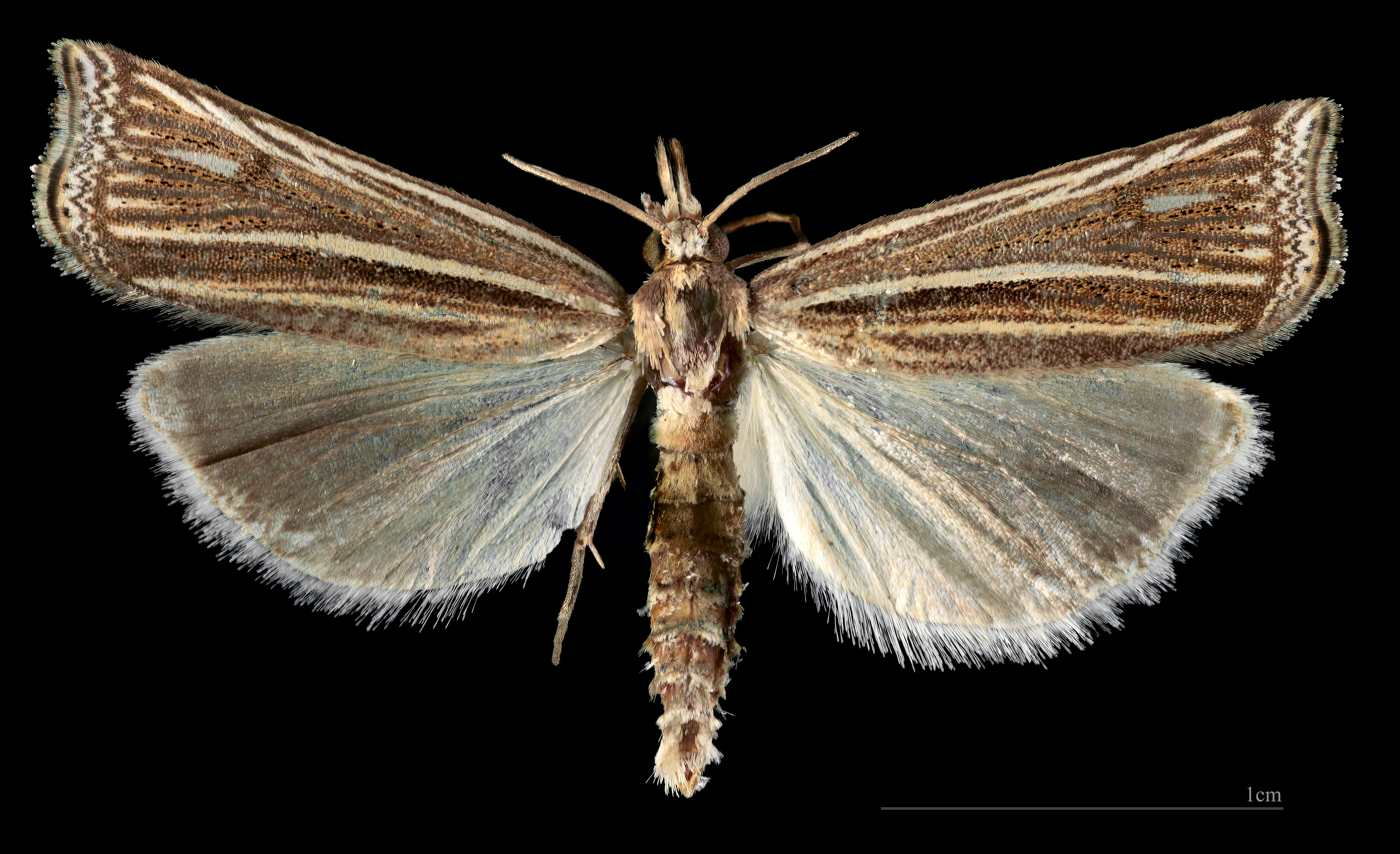
♂

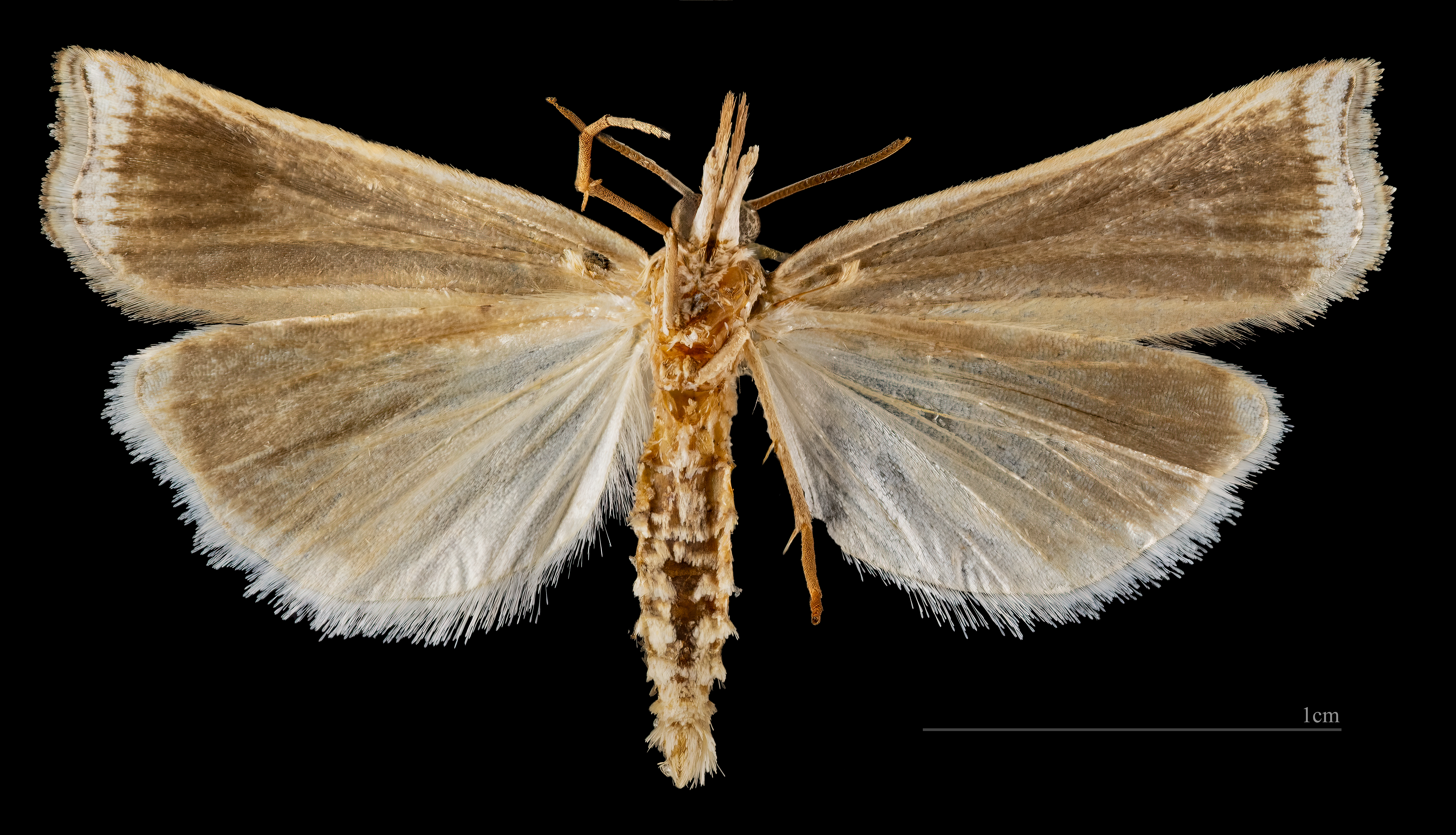
♂ △

== Biology ==
The moth flies from June to July in England; in Southern Europe they fly from June to September. The larvae feed on larger grasses.
