= Ancylolomia punctistrigellus =

Scientific classification
- Kingdom: Animalia
- Phylum: Arthropoda
- Clade: Pancrustacea
- Class: Insecta
- Order: Lepidoptera
- Family: Crambidae
- Subfamily: Crambinae
- Tribe: Ancylolomiini
- Genus: Ancylolomia
- Species: A. punctistrigellus

Binomial name
- Ancylolomia punctistrigellus (Mabille, 1880)

Synonyms
- Crambus punctistrigellus Mabille, 1880

Species of moth

Ancylolomia punctistrigellus is a species of moth in the family Crambidae. It is found in Madagascar.
