= Ancylolomia inornata =

Scientific classification
- Kingdom: Animalia
- Phylum: Arthropoda
- Clade: Pancrustacea
- Class: Insecta
- Order: Lepidoptera
- Family: Crambidae
- Subfamily: Crambinae
- Tribe: Ancylolomiini
- Genus: Ancylolomia
- Species: A. inornata

Binomial name
- Ancylolomia inornata Staudinger, 1870

Synonyms
- Ancylolomia anargyrella Chrétien, 1896; Chilo rabatellus D. Lucas, 1939; Ctenus confusella Turati, 1929; Ctenus malacellus Mabille, 1906; Ancylolomia inornatella Hampson, 1896

Species of moth

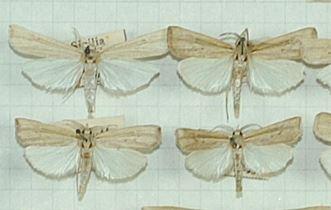
Ancylolomia inornata

Ancylolomia inornata is a species of moth in the family Crambidae described by Otto Staudinger in 1870. It is found in Spain, Portugal and Italy, North Africa (including Morocco, Algeria, Libya and Tunisia), Southern Africa (including Zambia and South Africa) and Pakistan.
