= Ancylolomia tripolitella =

Scientific classification
- Kingdom: Animalia
- Phylum: Arthropoda
- Clade: Pancrustacea
- Class: Insecta
- Order: Lepidoptera
- Family: Crambidae
- Subfamily: Crambinae
- Tribe: Ancylolomiini
- Genus: Ancylolomia
- Species: A. tripolitella

Binomial name
- Ancylolomia tripolitella Rebel, 1909 (Note: Some sources give the year of description as 1908, but based on the volume number of Zoologische Jahrbücher, 1909 seems to be correct.)

Species of moth

Ancylolomia tripolitella is a species of moth in the family Crambidae described by Hans Rebel in 1909. It is found in Spain and on Sardinia, Malta, and the Canary Islands, in Iran, and in Algeria, Libya, Syria, Jordan and Bahrain.
