= Ancylolomia claudia =

Scientific classification
- Kingdom: Animalia
- Phylum: Arthropoda
- Clade: Pancrustacea
- Class: Insecta
- Order: Lepidoptera
- Family: Crambidae
- Subfamily: Crambinae
- Tribe: Ancylolomiini
- Genus: Ancylolomia
- Species: A. claudia

Binomial name
- Ancylolomia claudia Bassi, 2013

Species of moth

Ancylolomia claudia is a moth in the family Crambidae. It was described by Graziano Bassi in 2013. It is found in Kenya and Tanzania.
