= Ancylolomia chrysographellus =

Angled grass moth

Scientific classification
- Kingdom: Animalia
- Phylum: Arthropoda
- Clade: Pancrustacea
- Class: Insecta
- Order: Lepidoptera
- Family: Crambidae
- Subfamily: Crambinae
- Tribe: Ancylolomiini
- Genus: Ancylolomia
- Species: A. chrysographellus

Binomial name
- Ancylolomia chrysographellus Kollar & Redtenbacher, 1844

Synonyms
- Chilo chrysographellus Kollar & Redtenbacher, 1844; Ancylolomia basistriga Moore, 1886; Ancylolomia bassistriga Błeszyński & Collins, 1962; Jartheza cassimella Swinhoe, 1887; Jartheza responsella Walker, 1863; Jartheza xylinella Walker, 1863

Species of moth

Ancylolomia chrysographellus, the angled grass moth, is a species of moth in the family Crambidae. It is found on Cyprus and in Kenya, Uganda, Yemen, India, Pakistan, Sri Lanka, Myanmar, China, Korea, Japan, Taiwan, the Philippines and Indonesia.

== Description ==
The wingspan is 25–30 mm for females and 20 mm for males. Antennae of male with short uniseriate laminated branches, which is simple in female. It is a brownish-ochreous moth. Forewings with silvery and yellow fascia, with streaks of black scales on them in cell and the interspaces beyond and below it. A minutely dentate submarginal silvery line with a more prominent tooth at vein 3. A whitish marginal band with a series of dark specks on it. Cilia silvery. Hindwings whitish, pale fuscous, or dark fuscous in Sri Lankan specimens. The forewings may have a white fascia developed on median nervure.

It is a minor pest of rice. The larvae are known to feed on many grasses.
