= Ancylolomia tripunctalis =

Scientific classification
- Kingdom: Animalia
- Phylum: Arthropoda
- Clade: Pancrustacea
- Class: Insecta
- Order: Lepidoptera
- Family: Crambidae
- Subfamily: Crambinae
- Tribe: Ancylolomiini
- Genus: Ancylolomia
- Species: A. tripunctalis

Binomial name
- Ancylolomia tripunctalis Maes, 2011

Species of moth

Ancylolomia tripunctalis is a moth in the family Crambidae. It was described by Koen V. N. Maes in 2011. It is found in Cameroon.
