= Ancylolomia carcinella =

Scientific classification
- Kingdom: Animalia
- Phylum: Arthropoda
- Clade: Pancrustacea
- Class: Insecta
- Order: Lepidoptera
- Family: Crambidae
- Subfamily: Crambinae
- Tribe: Ancylolomiini
- Genus: Ancylolomia
- Species: A. carcinella

Binomial name
- Ancylolomia carcinella Wang & Sung, 1981

Species of moth

Ancylolomia carcinella is a moth in the family Crambidae. It was described by Wang and Sung in 1981. It is found in China (Yunnan).
