= Ancylolomia saundersiella =

Scientific classification
- Kingdom: Animalia
- Phylum: Arthropoda
- Clade: Pancrustacea
- Class: Insecta
- Order: Lepidoptera
- Family: Crambidae
- Subfamily: Crambinae
- Tribe: Ancylolomiini
- Genus: Ancylolomia
- Species: A. saundersiella

Binomial name
- Ancylolomia saundersiella Zeller, 1863

Synonyms
- Jartheza biplagella Moore, 1872

Species of moth

Ancylolomia saundersiella, the Black-streaked grass-moth is a moth in the family Crambidae. It was described by Zeller in 1863. It is found in South India, and is known from Pune, Mumbai, Bangalore, and other parts.
