= Ancylolomia shefferialis =

Scientific classification
- Kingdom: Animalia
- Phylum: Arthropoda
- Clade: Pancrustacea
- Class: Insecta
- Order: Lepidoptera
- Family: Crambidae
- Subfamily: Crambinae
- Tribe: Ancylolomiini
- Genus: Ancylolomia
- Species: A. shefferialis

Binomial name
- Ancylolomia shefferialis Rougeot, 1984

Species of moth

Ancylolomia shefferialis is a moth in the family Crambidae. It was described by Rougeot in 1984. It is found in Ethiopia.
