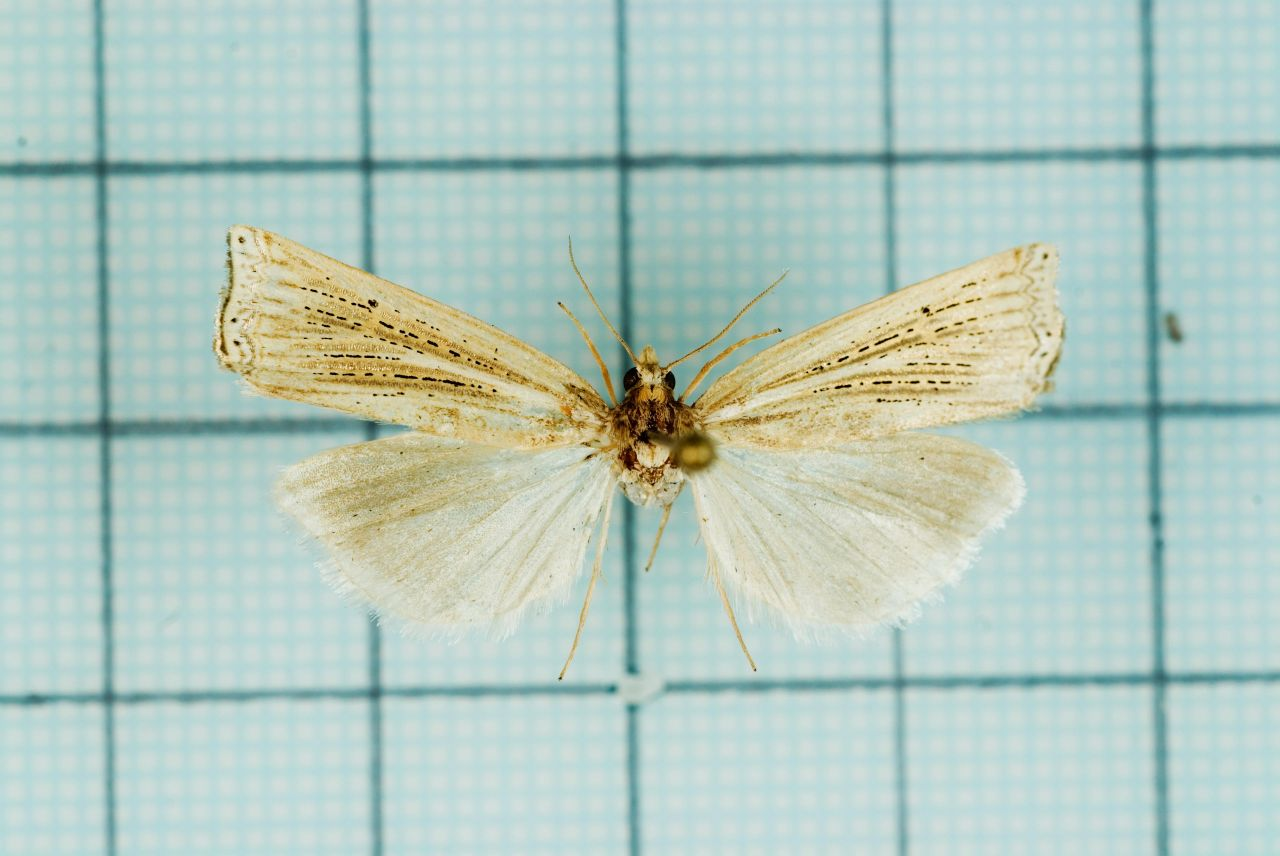

Scientific classification
- Kingdom: Animalia
- Phylum: Arthropoda
- Clade: Pancrustacea
- Class: Insecta
- Order: Lepidoptera
- Family: Crambidae
- Subfamily: Crambinae
- Tribe: Ancylolomiini
- Genus: Ancylolomia
- Species: A. japonica

Binomial name
- Ancylolomia japonica Zeller, 1877

= Ancylolomia japonica =

Species of moth

Ancylolomia japonica is a moth of the family Crambidae. It is found in Ussuri, Korea, Japan, China (Yunnan, Gansu, Shandong, Fujian, Guangdong), Tibet and Taiwan.

The wingspan is 24–38 mm.
