= Ancylolomia perfasciata =

Scientific classification
- Kingdom: Animalia
- Phylum: Arthropoda
- Clade: Pancrustacea
- Class: Insecta
- Order: Lepidoptera
- Family: Crambidae
- Subfamily: Crambinae
- Tribe: Ancylolomiini
- Genus: Ancylolomia
- Species: A. perfasciata

Binomial name
- Ancylolomia perfasciata Hampson, 1919

Species of moth

Ancylolomia perfasciata is a species of moth in the family Crambidae. This species is known from eastern and southern Africa (Ethiopia, Kenya, Zimbabwe, Uganda and South Africa) and from Madagascar.

Its wingspan is 32–42 mm.
