= Ancylolomia shafferi =

Scientific classification
- Kingdom: Animalia
- Phylum: Arthropoda
- Clade: Pancrustacea
- Class: Insecta
- Order: Lepidoptera
- Family: Crambidae
- Subfamily: Crambinae
- Tribe: Ancylolomiini
- Genus: Ancylolomia
- Species: A. shafferi

Binomial name
- Ancylolomia shafferi Rougeot, 1977

Species of moth

Ancylolomia shafferi is a moth in the family Crambidae. It was described by Rougeot in 1977. It is found in Ethiopia and has a pale grey head, abdomen, and thorax.
