= Ancylolomia palpella =

Scientific classification
- Kingdom: Animalia
- Phylum: Arthropoda
- Clade: Pancrustacea
- Class: Insecta
- Order: Lepidoptera
- Family: Crambidae
- Subfamily: Crambinae
- Tribe: Ancylolomiini
- Genus: Ancylolomia
- Species: A. palpella

Binomial name
- Ancylolomia palpella (Denis & Schiffermuller, 1775)

Synonyms
- Tinea palpella Denis & Schiffermuller, 1775; Ancylolomia palpella var. sovinskyi Krulikovsky, 1909; Ancylolomia palpella gracilella Caradja, 1916; Ancylolomia palpigeralis Hübner, 1825; Ancylolomia palpella syriaca Rebel, 1911; Ancylolomia affinis Rothschild, 1921; Ancylolomia syriaca var. mesopotamica Rebel, 1918

Species of moth

Ancylolomia palpella is a species of moth in the family Crambidae described by Michael Denis and Ignaz Schiffermüller in 1775. It is found in Belgium, France, Spain, Portugal, Italy, Austria, the Czech Republic, Slovakia, Poland, Hungary, Croatia, Romania, Bulgaria, the Republic of Macedonia, Albania, Greece, Ukraine, Russia, Transcaucasia, Asia Minor, Lebanon, the Palestinian territories, Iraq, Syria, Iran and Central Asia.

The wingspan is 31–36 mm for males and 34–45 mm for females. Adults are on wing from June to October in two generations per year.

The larvae feed in the stems of various grasses within a silken gallery. Pupation takes place in a cocoon covered in grass detritus.

== Subspecies ==
- Ancylolomia palpella palpella (Europe, western Russia, the Ural, Transcaucasia, Asia Minor, the Palestinian Territories, Iraq, Syria, Iran)
- Ancylolomia palpella syriaca Rebel, 1911 (the Palestinian Territories, Lebanon, Asia Minor, Syria, Iraq)
- Ancylolomia palpella gracilella Caradja, 1916 (Central Asia: Aulie-Ata)
