= Ancylolomia sansibarica =

Scientific classification
- Kingdom: Animalia
- Phylum: Arthropoda
- Clade: Pancrustacea
- Class: Insecta
- Order: Lepidoptera
- Family: Crambidae
- Subfamily: Crambinae
- Tribe: Ancylolomiini
- Genus: Ancylolomia
- Species: A. sansibarica

Binomial name
- Ancylolomia sansibarica Zeller, 1877

Species of moth

Ancylolomia sansibarica is a moth in the family Crambidae. It was described by Zeller in 1877. It is found in Tanzania, where it has been recorded from Zanzibar.
