= Ancylolomia parentii =

Scientific classification
- Kingdom: Animalia
- Phylum: Arthropoda
- Clade: Pancrustacea
- Class: Insecta
- Order: Lepidoptera
- Family: Crambidae
- Subfamily: Crambinae
- Tribe: Ancylolomiini
- Genus: Ancylolomia
- Species: A. parentii

Binomial name
- Ancylolomia parentii Bassi in Bassi & Trematerra, 2014

Species of moth

Ancylolomia parentii is a moth in the family Crambidae. It was described by Graziano Bassi in 2014. It is found in Mozambique.
