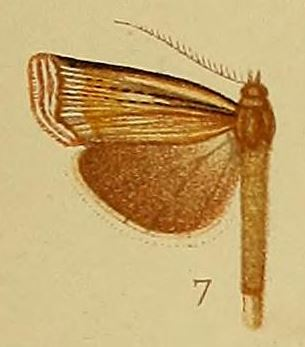

Scientific classification
- Kingdom: Animalia
- Phylum: Arthropoda
- Clade: Pancrustacea
- Class: Insecta
- Order: Lepidoptera
- Family: Crambidae
- Subfamily: Crambinae
- Tribe: Ancylolomiini
- Genus: Ancylolomia
- Species: A. pectinifera

Binomial name
- Ancylolomia pectinifera Hampson, 1910

= Ancylolomia pectinifera =

Species of moth

Ancylolomia pectinifera is a moth in the family Crambidae. It was described by George Hampson in 1910. It is found in Kenya, Somalia, South Africa, Zambia and Zimbabwe.
