= Ancylolomia minutella =

Scientific classification
- Kingdom: Animalia
- Phylum: Arthropoda
- Clade: Pancrustacea
- Class: Insecta
- Order: Lepidoptera
- Family: Crambidae
- Subfamily: Crambinae
- Tribe: Ancylolomiini
- Genus: Ancylolomia
- Species: A. minutella

Binomial name
- Ancylolomia minutella Turati, 1926

Species of moth

Ancylolomia minutella is a moth in the family Crambidae. It was described by Turati in 1926. It is found in Libya.
