= Ancylolomia indica =

Scientific classification
- Kingdom: Animalia
- Phylum: Arthropoda
- Clade: Pancrustacea
- Class: Insecta
- Order: Lepidoptera
- Family: Crambidae
- Subfamily: Crambinae
- Tribe: Ancylolomiini
- Genus: Ancylolomia
- Species: A. indica

Binomial name
- Ancylolomia indica C. Felder, R. Felder & Rogenhofer, 1875

Species of moth

Ancylolomia indica, the Indian pale grass moth is a moth in the family Crambidae. It was described by Cajetan Felder, Rudolf Felder and Alois Friedrich Rogenhofer in 1875. It is found in India. It is externally indistinguishable from the nominate subspecies of Ancylolomia westwoodi. It is one of the most common species from the genus found in India.
