= Ancylolomia locupletellus =

Scientific classification
- Kingdom: Animalia
- Phylum: Arthropoda
- Clade: Pancrustacea
- Class: Insecta
- Order: Lepidoptera
- Family: Crambidae
- Subfamily: Crambinae
- Tribe: Ancylolomiini
- Genus: Ancylolomia
- Species: A. locupletellus

Binomial name
- Ancylolomia locupletellus (Kollar & Redtenbacher, 1844)

Synonyms
- Chilo locupletellus Kollar & Redtenbacher, 1844

Species of moth

Ancylolomia locupletellus, the Glossy grass-moth is a moth in the family Crambidae. It was described by Vincenz Kollar and Ludwig Redtenbacher in 1844. It is found in India.

== Description ==
The wingspan is about 22 mm in the male and 34 mm in the female. The antennae of the male have short uniseriate laminated branches, which are simple in the female. The ground color of the forewings is dark greyish. There are prominent white fascia on the costa and below the median nervure. The marginal band is whitish. Hindwings pale fuscous with a white margin.

Larva feeds on Frullania squarrosa by boring into the stem.
