= Ancylolomia auripaleella =

Scientific classification
- Kingdom: Animalia
- Phylum: Arthropoda
- Clade: Pancrustacea
- Class: Insecta
- Order: Lepidoptera
- Family: Crambidae
- Subfamily: Crambinae
- Tribe: Ancylolomiini
- Genus: Ancylolomia
- Species: A. auripaleella

Binomial name
- Ancylolomia auripaleella Marion, 1954

Species of moth

Ancylolomia auripaleella is a moth in the family Crambidae. It was described by Hubert Marion in 1954. It is found on Madagascar.
