= Ancylolomia capensis =

Scientific classification
- Kingdom: Animalia
- Phylum: Arthropoda
- Clade: Pancrustacea
- Class: Insecta
- Order: Lepidoptera
- Family: Crambidae
- Subfamily: Crambinae
- Tribe: Ancylolomiini
- Genus: Ancylolomia
- Species: A. capensis

Binomial name
- Ancylolomia capensis Zeller, 1852

Synonyms
- Ancylolomia chrysolinealis Fawcett, 1918; Ancylolomia cinerifusa de Joannis, 1927

Species of moth

Ancylolomia capensis is a species of moth in the family Crambidae. this species is known from central, eastern and southern Africa (Congo, Kenya, Mozambique, Rwanda, South Africa and Madagascar).
