= Ancylolomia uniformella =

Scientific classification
- Kingdom: Animalia
- Phylum: Arthropoda
- Clade: Pancrustacea
- Class: Insecta
- Order: Lepidoptera
- Family: Crambidae
- Subfamily: Crambinae
- Tribe: Ancylolomiini
- Genus: Ancylolomia
- Species: A. uniformella

Binomial name
- Ancylolomia uniformella Hampson, 1896

Species of moth

Ancylolomia uniformella, the Plain grass-moth is a moth in the family Crambidae. It was described by George Hampson in 1896. It is found in India. It is easily distinguished from other Ancylolomia species by its lack of silver stripes on the forewing.
