= Ancylolomia argentata =

Scientific classification
- Kingdom: Animalia
- Phylum: Arthropoda
- Clade: Pancrustacea
- Class: Insecta
- Order: Lepidoptera
- Family: Crambidae
- Subfamily: Crambinae
- Tribe: Ancylolomiini
- Genus: Ancylolomia
- Species: A. argentata

Binomial name
- Ancylolomia argentata Moore, 1885

Species of moth

Ancylolomia argentata is a moth in the family Crambidae. It was described by Frederic Moore in 1885. It is found in Sri Lanka.
