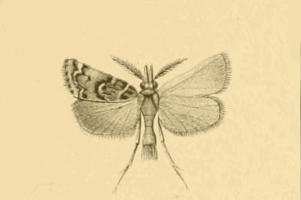

Scientific classification
- Domain: Eukaryota
- Kingdom: Animalia
- Phylum: Arthropoda
- Class: Insecta
- Order: Lepidoptera
- Family: Crambidae
- Subfamily: Crambinae
- Tribe: Ancylolomiini
- Genus: Prionapteryx; Stephens, 1834

Synonyms
- Alloea Turner, 1947; Calarina Walker, 1866; Hypotomorpha Rebel, 1892; Nuarace Walker, 1863; Naurace Bleszynski & Collins, 1962; Pindicitora Walker, 1863; Pindicitra Shibuya, 1928; Platytesia Strand, 1918; Prionopteryx Zeller, 1863; Loxophantis Meyrick, 1935

= Prionapteryx =

Genus of moths

Prionapteryx is a genus of moths of the family Crambidae.

== Species ==
- Prionapteryx achatina Zeller, 1863
- Prionapteryx acreonalis (Walker, 1863)
- Prionapteryx africalis Hampson, 1896
- Prionapteryx albescens (Hampson, 1919)
- Prionapteryx albiceps (Hampson, 1919)
- Prionapteryx albicostalis (Hampson, 1919)
- Prionapteryx albimaculalis (Hampson, 1919)
- Prionapteryx albipennis Butler, 1886
- Prionapteryx albofascialis (Hampson, 1919)
- Prionapteryx amathusia Bassi & Mey in Mey, 2011
- Prionapteryx annusalis (Walker, 1863)
- Prionapteryx arenalis (Hampson, 1919)
- Prionapteryx argentescens (Hampson, 1919)
- Prionapteryx banaadirensis Bassi, 2013
- Prionapteryx bergii (Zeller, 1877)
- Prionapteryx brevivittalis Hampson, 1919
- Prionapteryx cuneolalis (Hulst, 1886)
- Prionapteryx delicatellus Caradja, 1927
- Prionapteryx diaperatalis (Hampson, 1919)
- Prionapteryx diaplecta (Meyrick, 1936)
- Prionapteryx eberti Bassi & Mey in Bassi, 2013
- Prionapteryx elongata (Zeller, 1877)
- Prionapteryx endoleuca (Hampson, 1919)
- Prionapteryx eugraphis (Walker, 1863)
- Prionapteryx flavipars (Hampson, 1919)
- Prionapteryx hedyscopa (Lower, 1905)
- Prionapteryx helena Bassi, 2013
- Prionapteryx indentella (Kearfott, 1908)
- Prionapteryx lancerotella (Rebel, 1892)
- Prionapteryx mesozonalis Hampson, 1919
- Prionapteryx moghrebana (D. Lucas, 1954)
- Prionapteryx molybdella (Hampson, 1919)
- Prionapteryx nebulifera Stephens, 1834
- Prionapteryx neotropicalis (Hampson, 1896)
- Prionapteryx nephalia (Meyrick, 1936)
- Prionapteryx ochrifasciata (Hampson, 1919)
- Prionapteryx phaeomesa (Hampson, 1919)
- Prionapteryx plumbealis (Hampson, 1919)
- Prionapteryx rubricalis Hampson, 1919
- Prionapteryx rubrifusalis (Hampson, 1919)
- Prionapteryx santella (Kearfott, 1908)
- Prionapteryx scitulellus (Walker, 1866)
- Prionapteryx selenalis (Hampson, 1919)
- Prionapteryx serpentella Kearfott, 1908
- Prionapteryx somala Bassi, 2013
- Prionapteryx spasmatica Meyrick, 1936
- Prionapteryx splendida Bassi & Mey in Mey, 2011
- Prionapteryx termia (Meyrick, 1885)
- Prionapteryx texturella (Zeller, 1877)
- Prionapteryx triplecta (Meyrick, 1935)
- Prionapteryx yavapai (Kearfott, 1908)

== Former species ==
- Prionapteryx albipunctella (Marion, 1957)
- Prionapteryx albostigmata (Rothschild, 1921)
- Prionapteryx alikangiella (Strand, 1918)
- Prionapteryx alternalis Maes, 2002
- Prionapteryx amselella (Bleszynski, 1965)
- Prionapteryx carmensita Bleszynski, 1970
- Prionapteryx diffusilinea (Hampson, 1919)
- Prionapteryx invectalis (Walker, 1863)
- Prionapteryx margherita (Bleszynski, 1965)
- Prionapteryx nigrifascialis (Walker, 1866)
- Prionapteryx obeliscota (Meyrick, 1936)
- Prionapteryx rufistrigalis (Fawcett, 1918)
- Prionapteryx soudanensis (Hampson, 1919)
- Prionapteryx strioliger (Rothschild, 1913)
- Prionapteryx thysbesalis Walker, 1863
