= Surattha =

Scientific classification
- Domain: Eukaryota
- Kingdom: Animalia
- Phylum: Arthropoda
- Class: Insecta
- Order: Lepidoptera
- Family: Crambidae
- Subfamily: Crambinae
- Tribe: Ancylolomiini
- Genus: Surattha; Walker, 1863

Genus of moths

Surattha is a genus of moths of the family Crambidae. The genus was synonymized with Prionapteryx by Stanisław Błeszyński in 1967. Its status was later revised by Graziano Bassi and Wolfram Mey in 2011.

== Description ==
Its palpi are porrect (extending forward) and thickly scaled, extending about one and half times length of head. Maxillary palp triangularly scaled. Frons with a conical process. Antennae of male bipectinated, usually with long branches. Tibia with long spurs, where the outer spurs about two-thirds the length of the inner. Forewings long and narrow, with rounded apex. Vein 3 from near angle of cell and veins 4 and 5 usually on a long stalk. Veins 6, 7, 10 and 11 free. Hindwings with vein 3 from near angle of cell and vein 5 absent. Vein 6 obsolescent from above middle of discocellulars and vein 7 anastomosing (fusing) with vein 8.

== Species ==
- Surattha africalis (Hampson, 1919)
- Surattha albipunctella Marion, 1957
- Surattha albistigma Wileman & South, 1918
- Surattha albostigmata Rothschild, 1921
- Surattha amselella Błeszyński, 1965
- Surattha carmensita (Błeszyński, 1970)
- Surattha diffusilinea Hampson, 1919
- Surattha fuscilella Swinhoe, 1895
- Surattha invectalis Walker, 1863
- Surattha luteola Bassi & Mey in Mey, 2011
- Surattha margherita Błeszyński, 1965
- Surattha nigrifascialis (Walker, 1866)
- Surattha obeliscota Meyrick, 1936
- Surattha rufistrigalis Fawcett, 1918
- Surattha soudanensis Hampson, 1919
- Surattha strioliger Rothschild, 1913
