= Prionapteryx cuneolalis =

Scientific classification
- Kingdom: Animalia
- Phylum: Arthropoda
- Clade: Pancrustacea
- Class: Insecta
- Order: Lepidoptera
- Family: Crambidae
- Subfamily: Crambinae
- Tribe: Ancylolomiini
- Genus: Prionapteryx
- Species: P. cuneolalis

Binomial name
- Prionapteryx cuneolalis (Hulst, 1886)

Synonyms
- Crambus cuneolalis Hulst, 1886

Species of moth

Prionapteryx cuneolalis is a species of moth in the family Crambidae. It was first described by George Duryea Hulst in 1886 and is found in North America, where it has been recorded from Texas.
