= Prionapteryx spasmatica =

Scientific classification
- Kingdom: Animalia
- Phylum: Arthropoda
- Clade: Pancrustacea
- Class: Insecta
- Order: Lepidoptera
- Family: Crambidae
- Subfamily: Crambinae
- Tribe: Ancylolomiini
- Genus: Prionapteryx
- Species: P. spasmatica

Binomial name
- Prionapteryx spasmatica Meyrick, 1936

Species of moth

Prionapteryx spasmatica is a moth in the family Crambidae. It is found in Argentina.
