= Prionapteryx africalis =

Scientific classification
- Kingdom: Animalia
- Phylum: Arthropoda
- Clade: Pancrustacea
- Class: Insecta
- Order: Lepidoptera
- Family: Crambidae
- Subfamily: Crambinae
- Tribe: Ancylolomiini
- Genus: Prionapteryx
- Species: P. africalis

Binomial name
- Prionapteryx africalis Hampson, 1896

Species of moth

Prionapteryx africalis is a moth in the family Crambidae. It was described by George Hampson in 1896. It is found in the Democratic Republic of the Congo and Ghana.
