= Prionapteryx rubricalis =

Scientific classification
- Kingdom: Animalia
- Phylum: Arthropoda
- Clade: Pancrustacea
- Class: Insecta
- Order: Lepidoptera
- Family: Crambidae
- Subfamily: Crambinae
- Tribe: Ancylolomiini
- Genus: Prionapteryx
- Species: P. rubricalis

Binomial name
- Prionapteryx rubricalis (Hampson, 1919)

Synonyms
- Prionopteryx rubricalis Hampson, 1919

Species of moth

Prionapteryx rubricalis is a moth in the family Crambidae. It is found in Nigeria.
