= Prionapteryx achatina =

Scientific classification
- Kingdom: Animalia
- Phylum: Arthropoda
- Clade: Pancrustacea
- Class: Insecta
- Order: Lepidoptera
- Family: Crambidae
- Subfamily: Crambinae
- Tribe: Ancylolomiini
- Genus: Prionapteryx
- Species: P. achatina

Binomial name
- Prionapteryx achatina Zeller, 1863

Synonyms
- Crambus delectalis Hulst, 1886

Species of moth

Prionapteryx achatina is a moth in the family Crambidae. It was described by Zeller in 1863. It is found in North America, where it has been recorded from Arizona, Colorado, Florida, Georgia, Indiana, Maryland, Massachusetts, Minnesota, New Hampshire, New Jersey, North Carolina, Ohio, South Carolina and Wisconsin.
