= Prionapteryx texturella =

Scientific classification
- Kingdom: Animalia
- Phylum: Arthropoda
- Clade: Pancrustacea
- Class: Insecta
- Order: Lepidoptera
- Family: Crambidae
- Subfamily: Crambinae
- Tribe: Ancylolomiini
- Genus: Prionapteryx
- Species: P. texturella

Binomial name
- Prionapteryx texturella (Zeller, 1877)

Synonyms
- Prionopteryx texturella Zeller, 1877

Species of moth

Prionapteryx texturella is a moth in the family Crambidae. It is found in Madagascar and Tanzania (Zanzibar).
