= Prionapteryx termia =

Scientific classification
- Kingdom: Animalia
- Phylum: Arthropoda
- Clade: Pancrustacea
- Class: Insecta
- Order: Lepidoptera
- Family: Crambidae
- Subfamily: Crambinae
- Tribe: Ancylolomiini
- Genus: Prionapteryx
- Species: P. termia

Binomial name
- Prionapteryx termia (Meyrick, 1885)

Synonyms
- Thinasotia termia Meyrick, 1885

Species of moth

Prionapteryx termia is a moth in the family Crambidae. It is found in Australia, where it has been recorded from Queensland.
