= Prionapteryx arenalis =

Scientific classification
- Kingdom: Animalia
- Phylum: Arthropoda
- Clade: Pancrustacea
- Class: Insecta
- Order: Lepidoptera
- Family: Crambidae
- Subfamily: Crambinae
- Tribe: Ancylolomiini
- Genus: Prionapteryx
- Species: P. arenalis

Binomial name
- Prionapteryx arenalis (Hampson, 1919)

Synonyms
- Surattha arenalis Hampson, 1919

Species of moth

Prionapteryx arenalis is a moth in the family Crambidae. It was described by George Hampson in 1919. It is found in the Punjab region of what was British India.

The wingspan is 24–26 mm. The forewings are whitish, uniformly suffused with pale reddish brown and with traces of a sinuous dark line. The hindwings are whitish, strongly suffused with reddish brown.
