= Prionapteryx plumbealis =

Scientific classification
- Kingdom: Animalia
- Phylum: Arthropoda
- Clade: Pancrustacea
- Class: Insecta
- Order: Lepidoptera
- Family: Crambidae
- Subfamily: Crambinae
- Tribe: Ancylolomiini
- Genus: Prionapteryx
- Species: P. plumbealis

Binomial name
- Prionapteryx plumbealis (Hampson, 1919)

Synonyms
- Prosmixis plumbealis Hampson, 1919

Species of moth

Prionapteryx plumbealis is a moth in the family Crambidae. It is found in Namibia and Zimbabwe.
