= Prionapteryx rubrifusalis =

Scientific classification
- Kingdom: Animalia
- Phylum: Arthropoda
- Clade: Pancrustacea
- Class: Insecta
- Order: Lepidoptera
- Family: Crambidae
- Subfamily: Crambinae
- Tribe: Ancylolomiini
- Genus: Prionapteryx
- Species: P. rubrifusalis

Binomial name
- Prionapteryx rubrifusalis (Hampson, 1919)

Synonyms
- Surattha rubrifusalis Hampson, 1919

Species of moth

Prionapteryx rubrifusalis is a moth in the family Crambidae. It is found in Kenya.
