= Prionapteryx nephalia =

Scientific classification
- Kingdom: Animalia
- Phylum: Arthropoda
- Clade: Pancrustacea
- Class: Insecta
- Order: Lepidoptera
- Family: Crambidae
- Subfamily: Crambinae
- Tribe: Ancylolomiini
- Genus: Prionapteryx
- Species: P. nephalia

Binomial name
- Prionapteryx nephalia (Meyrick, 1936)

Synonyms
- Prionopteryx nephalia Meyrick, 1936

Species of moth

Prionapteryx nephalia is a moth in the family Crambidae, found in Argentina.
