= Surattha fuscilella =

Scientific classification
- Domain: Eukaryota
- Kingdom: Animalia
- Phylum: Arthropoda
- Class: Insecta
- Order: Lepidoptera
- Family: Crambidae
- Subfamily: Crambinae
- Tribe: Ancylolomiini
- Genus: Surattha
- Species: S. fuscilella

Binomial name
- Surattha fuscilella C. Swinhoe, 1895

Species of moth

Surattha fuscilella is a moth in the family Crambidae. It was described by Charles Swinhoe in 1895. It is found in India.
