= Prionapteryx diaperatalis =

Scientific classification
- Kingdom: Animalia
- Phylum: Arthropoda
- Clade: Pancrustacea
- Class: Insecta
- Order: Lepidoptera
- Family: Crambidae
- Subfamily: Crambinae
- Tribe: Ancylolomiini
- Genus: Prionapteryx
- Species: P. diaperatalis

Binomial name
- Prionapteryx diaperatalis (Hampson, 1919)

Synonyms
- Mesolia diaperatalis Hampson, 1919; Mesolia diaperalis Błeszyński & Collins, 1962

Species of moth

Prionapteryx diaperatalis is a moth in the family Crambidae. It was described by George Hampson in 1919. It is found in Mexico.
