= Prionapteryx scitulellus =

Scientific classification
- Kingdom: Animalia
- Phylum: Arthropoda
- Clade: Pancrustacea
- Class: Insecta
- Order: Lepidoptera
- Family: Crambidae
- Subfamily: Crambinae
- Tribe: Ancylolomiini
- Genus: Prionapteryx
- Species: P. scitulellus

Binomial name
- Prionapteryx scitulellus (Walker, 1866)

Synonyms
- Surattha scitulellus Walker, 1866

Species of moth

Prionapteryx scitulellus is a moth in the family Crambidae described by Francis Walker in 1866. It is found in India, Sri Lanka and Kenya.

In the male, the wingspan measures around 16 mm, while in the female, it extends to approximately 24 mm. The forewings exhibit a brownish-ochreous hue, adorned with a black discocellular spot and a sequence of black specks along the margin. As for the hindwings, they present a pale fuscous or whitish tone.

The larvae of P. scitulellus nourish themselves by consuming the leaves of diverse plants, such as jute, tea, and mango. Although they pose only a minor threat, they can be considered as pests affecting these crops.

== Description ==
The wingspan is about 16 mm in the male and 24 mm in the female. Forewings with veins 4 and 5 stalked. It is a brownish-ochreous moth. Head, thorax, and abdomen tinged with fuscous. Forewings with diffused fuscous on basal inner area and defining the inner side of the oblique ochreous medial band, where the area between which and the oblique submarginal band is fuscous except on the costal area. A black discocellular spot. The submarginal band dentate inwards below costa. The marginal area fuscous, with a series of black specks. Hindwings pale fuscous or whitish.
