= Prionapteryx amathusia =

Scientific classification
- Kingdom: Animalia
- Phylum: Arthropoda
- Clade: Pancrustacea
- Class: Insecta
- Order: Lepidoptera
- Family: Crambidae
- Subfamily: Crambinae
- Tribe: Ancylolomiini
- Genus: Prionapteryx
- Species: P. amathusia

Binomial name
- Prionapteryx amathusia Bassi & Mey, 2011

Species of moth

Prionapteryx amathusia is a moth in the family Crambidae. It was described by Graziano Bassi and Wolfram Mey in 2011. It is found in Namibia.
