= Prionapteryx nebulifera =

Scientific classification
- Kingdom: Animalia
- Phylum: Arthropoda
- Clade: Pancrustacea
- Class: Insecta
- Order: Lepidoptera
- Family: Crambidae
- Subfamily: Crambinae
- Tribe: Ancylolomiini
- Genus: Prionapteryx
- Species: P. nebulifera

Binomial name
- Prionapteryx nebulifera Stephens, 1834

Species of moth

Prionapteryx nebulifera, the clouded veneer moth, is a moth in the family Crambidae. It was described by Stephens in 1834. It is found in North America, where it has been recorded from Florida, Georgia, Maryland, Michigan, New Hampshire, Ontario, South Carolina and Wisconsin.

Adults have been recorded on wing from May to August.

The larvae feed on Ericaceae species, including Leiophyllum buxifolium and probably Gaylussacia species. Pupation takes place in the larval retreat.

== Etymology ==
The species name is derived from Latin nebula (meaning mist, fog, clouds) and fera (meaning bearing).
