= Prionapteryx hedyscopa =

Scientific classification
- Kingdom: Animalia
- Phylum: Arthropoda
- Clade: Pancrustacea
- Class: Insecta
- Order: Lepidoptera
- Family: Crambidae
- Subfamily: Crambinae
- Tribe: Ancylolomiini
- Genus: Prionapteryx
- Species: P. hedyscopa

Binomial name
- Prionapteryx hedyscopa (Lower, 1905)

Synonyms
- Surattha hedyscopa Lower, 1905

Species of moth

Prionapteryx hedyscopa is a moth in the family Crambidae. It was described by Oswald Bertram Lower in 1905. It is found in Australia, where it has been recorded from New South Wales.

The wingspan is 18–24 mm (0.71–0.94 in). The forewings are ochreous, somewhat irrorated (sprinkled) with ferruginous and fuscous. The hindwings are fuscous grey, paler and becoming grey on the basal half. Adults have been recorded on wing in February.
