= Prionapteryx acreonalis =

Scientific classification
- Kingdom: Animalia
- Phylum: Arthropoda
- Clade: Pancrustacea
- Class: Insecta
- Order: Lepidoptera
- Family: Crambidae
- Subfamily: Crambinae
- Tribe: Ancylolomiini
- Genus: Prionapteryx
- Species: P. acreonalis

Binomial name
- Prionapteryx acreonalis (Walker, 1863)

Synonyms
- Pindicitora acreonalis Walker, 1863

Species of moth

Prionapteryx acreonalis is a moth in the family Crambidae. It was described by Francis Walker in 1863. It is found in Sri Lanka.
