= Prionapteryx phaeomesa =

Scientific classification
- Kingdom: Animalia
- Phylum: Arthropoda
- Clade: Pancrustacea
- Class: Insecta
- Order: Lepidoptera
- Family: Crambidae
- Subfamily: Crambinae
- Tribe: Ancylolomiini
- Genus: Prionapteryx
- Species: P. phaeomesa

Binomial name
- Prionapteryx phaeomesa (Hampson, 1919)

Synonyms
- Surattha phaeomesa Hampson, 1919

Species of moth

Prionapteryx phaeomesa is a moth in the family Crambidae. It is found in Tanzania.
