= Prionapteryx delicatellus =

Scientific classification
- Kingdom: Animalia
- Phylum: Arthropoda
- Clade: Pancrustacea
- Class: Insecta
- Order: Lepidoptera
- Family: Crambidae
- Subfamily: Crambinae
- Tribe: Ancylolomiini
- Genus: Prionapteryx
- Species: P. delicatellus

Binomial name
- Prionapteryx delicatellus Caradja, 1927

Species of moth

Prionapteryx delicatellus is a moth in the family Crambidae. It was described by Aristide Caradja in 1927. It is found in Sichuan, China.
