= Prionapteryx moghrebana =

Scientific classification
- Kingdom: Animalia
- Phylum: Arthropoda
- Clade: Pancrustacea
- Class: Insecta
- Order: Lepidoptera
- Family: Crambidae
- Subfamily: Crambinae
- Tribe: Ancylolomiini
- Genus: Prionapteryx
- Species: P. moghrebana

Binomial name
- Prionapteryx moghrebana (D. Lucas, 1954)

Synonyms
- Hypotomorpha moghrebana D. Lucas, 1954

Species of moth

Prionapteryx moghrebana is a moth in the family Crambidae. It was described by Daniel Lucas in 1954. It is found in Morocco.
