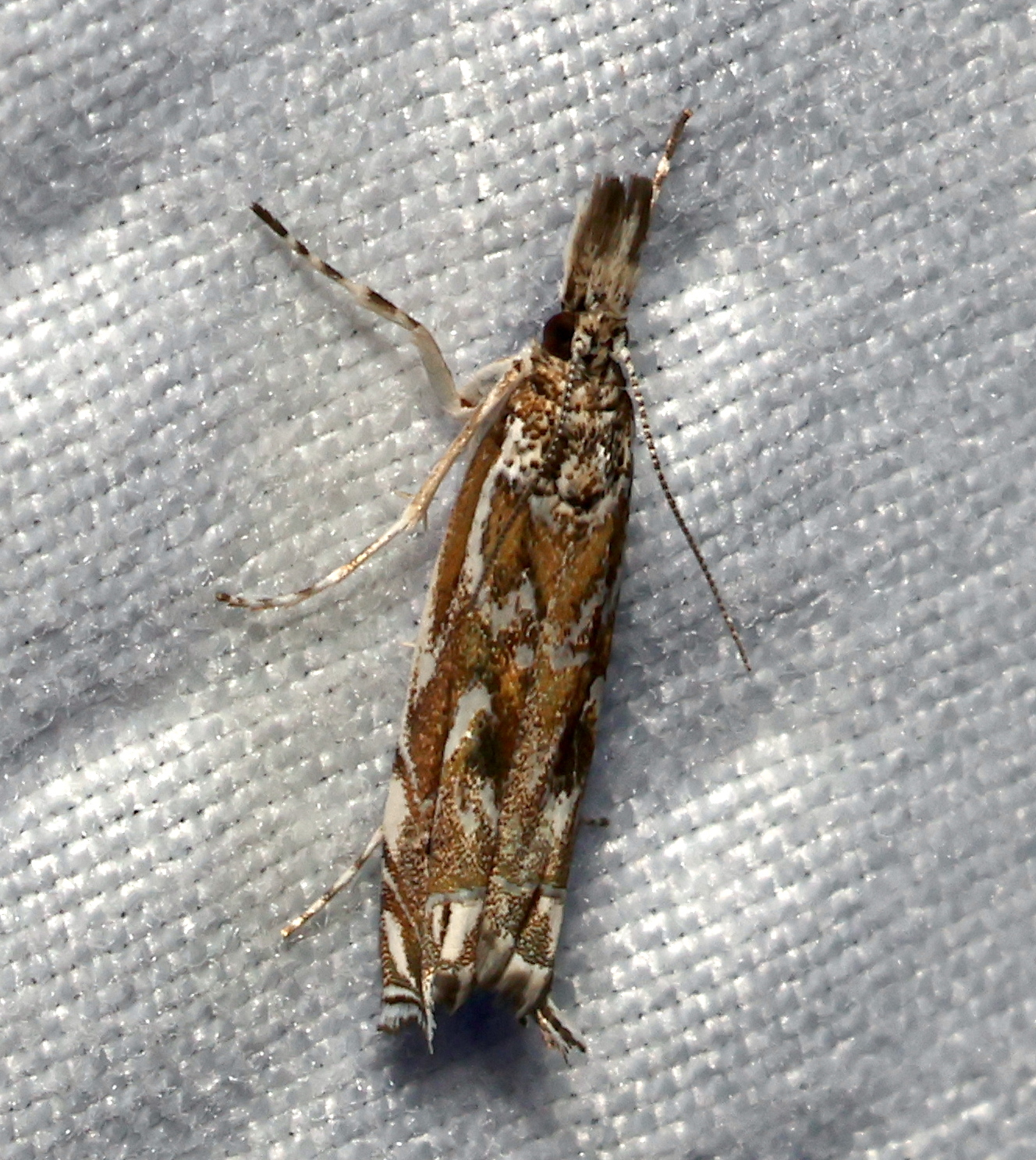

Scientific classification
- Kingdom: Animalia
- Phylum: Arthropoda
- Clade: Pancrustacea
- Class: Insecta
- Order: Lepidoptera
- Family: Crambidae
- Subfamily: Crambinae
- Tribe: Ancylolomiini
- Genus: Prionapteryx
- Species: P. serpentella

Binomial name
- Prionapteryx serpentella Kearfott, 1908

= Prionapteryx serpentella =

Species of moth

Prionapteryx serpentella is a moth in the family Crambidae. It is found in North America, where it has been recorded from Florida, Louisiana, North Carolina and South Carolina.
