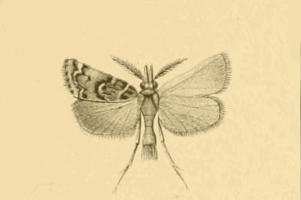

Scientific classification
- Kingdom: Animalia
- Phylum: Arthropoda
- Clade: Pancrustacea
- Class: Insecta
- Order: Lepidoptera
- Family: Crambidae
- Subfamily: Crambinae
- Tribe: Ancylolomiini
- Genus: Prionapteryx
- Species: P. lancerotella

Binomial name
- Prionapteryx lancerotella (Rebel, 1892)

Synonyms
- Hypotomorpha lancerotella Rebel, 1892

= Prionapteryx lancerotella =

Species of moth

Prionapteryx lancerotella is a species of moth in the family Crambidae. It is found on the Canary Islands.

The wingspan is 17–20 mm.
