= Prionapteryx neotropicalis =

Scientific classification
- Kingdom: Animalia
- Phylum: Arthropoda
- Clade: Pancrustacea
- Class: Insecta
- Order: Lepidoptera
- Family: Crambidae
- Subfamily: Crambinae
- Tribe: Ancylolomiini
- Genus: Prionapteryx
- Species: P. neotropicalis

Binomial name
- Prionapteryx neotropicalis (Hampson, 1896)

Synonyms
- Surattha neotropicalis Hampson, 1896

Species of moth

Prionapteryx neotropicalis is a moth in the family Crambidae. It is found in Argentina.
