= Surattha luteola =

Scientific classification
- Kingdom: Animalia
- Phylum: Arthropoda
- Clade: Pancrustacea
- Class: Insecta
- Order: Lepidoptera
- Family: Crambidae
- Subfamily: Crambinae
- Tribe: Ancylolomiini
- Genus: Surattha
- Species: S. luteola

Binomial name
- Surattha luteola Bassi & Mey, 2011

Species of moth

Surattha luteola is a species of moth belonging to the family Crambidae. It was formally described in 2011 by entomologists Graziano Bassi and Wolfram Mey. The species has been recorded in parts of southern Africa, specifically in Angola, Namibia, and South Africa, where it inhabits regional ecosystems suitable for its survival.
