= Prionapteryx santella =

Scientific classification
- Kingdom: Animalia
- Phylum: Arthropoda
- Clade: Pancrustacea
- Class: Insecta
- Order: Lepidoptera
- Family: Crambidae
- Subfamily: Crambinae
- Tribe: Ancylolomiini
- Genus: Prionapteryx
- Species: P. santella

Binomial name
- Prionapteryx santella (Kearfott, 1908)

Synonyms
- Surattha santella Kearfott, 1908

Species of moth

Prionapteryx santella is a moth in the family Crambidae. It is found in North America, where it has been recorded from Arizona.

The wingspan is 19 mm. The forewings are white, with shades and marks of light and dark ochreous brown. The hindwings are light, smoky grey.
