= Prionapteryx bergii =

Scientific classification
- Kingdom: Animalia
- Phylum: Arthropoda
- Clade: Pancrustacea
- Class: Insecta
- Order: Lepidoptera
- Family: Crambidae
- Subfamily: Crambinae
- Tribe: Ancylolomiini
- Genus: Prionapteryx
- Species: P. bergii

Binomial name
- Prionapteryx bergii (Zeller, 1877)

Synonyms
- Prionopteryx bergii Zeller, 1877

Species of moth

Prionapteryx bergii is a moth in the family Crambidae. It was described by Zeller in 1877. It is found in Argentina.
