= Prionapteryx molybdella =

Scientific classification
- Kingdom: Animalia
- Phylum: Arthropoda
- Clade: Pancrustacea
- Class: Insecta
- Order: Lepidoptera
- Family: Crambidae
- Subfamily: Crambinae
- Tribe: Ancylolomiini
- Genus: Prionapteryx
- Species: P. molybdella

Binomial name
- Prionapteryx molybdella (Hampson, 1919)

Synonyms
- Prosmixis molybdella Hampson, 1919

Species of moth

Prionapteryx molybdella is a moth in the family Crambidae. It was described by George Hampson in 1919. It is found in South Africa, where it has been recorded from the Eastern Cape.
