= Prionapteryx triplecta =

Scientific classification
- Kingdom: Animalia
- Phylum: Arthropoda
- Clade: Pancrustacea
- Class: Insecta
- Order: Lepidoptera
- Family: Crambidae
- Subfamily: Crambinae
- Tribe: Ancylolomiini
- Genus: Prionapteryx
- Species: P. triplecta

Binomial name
- Prionapteryx triplecta (Meyrick, 1935)

Synonyms
- Loxophantis triplecta Meyrick, 1935

Species of moth

Prionapteryx triplecta is a moth in the family Crambidae. It was described by Edward Meyrick in 1935. It is found in the Democratic Republic of the Congo.
