= Prionapteryx diaplecta =

Scientific classification
- Kingdom: Animalia
- Phylum: Arthropoda
- Clade: Pancrustacea
- Class: Insecta
- Order: Lepidoptera
- Family: Crambidae
- Subfamily: Crambinae
- Tribe: Ancylolomiini
- Genus: Prionapteryx
- Species: P. diaplecta

Binomial name
- Prionapteryx diaplecta (Meyrick, 1936)

Synonyms
- Loxophantis diaplecta Meyrick, 1936

Species of moth

Prionapteryx diaplecta is a moth in the family Crambidae. It was described by Edward Meyrick in 1936. It is found in Burundi and Kenya.
