= Prionapteryx yavapai =

Scientific classification
- Kingdom: Animalia
- Phylum: Arthropoda
- Clade: Pancrustacea
- Class: Insecta
- Order: Lepidoptera
- Family: Crambidae
- Subfamily: Crambinae
- Tribe: Ancylolomiini
- Genus: Prionapteryx
- Species: P. yavapai

Binomial name
- Prionapteryx yavapai (Kearfott, 1908)

Synonyms
- Eugrotea yavapai Kearfott, 1908

Species of moth

Prionapteryx yavapai is a moth in the family Crambidae. It is found in North America, where it has been recorded from Arizona.
