= Prionapteryx albicostalis =

Scientific classification
- Kingdom: Animalia
- Phylum: Arthropoda
- Clade: Pancrustacea
- Class: Insecta
- Order: Lepidoptera
- Family: Crambidae
- Subfamily: Crambinae
- Tribe: Ancylolomiini
- Genus: Prionapteryx
- Species: P. albicostalis

Binomial name
- Prionapteryx albicostalis (Hampson, 1919)

Synonyms
- Surattha albicostalis Hampson, 1919

Species of moth

Prionapteryx albicostalis is a moth in the family Crambidae. It was described by George Hampson in 1919. It is found in what was Madras State in India.

The wingspan is 28 millimetres (1.1 in). The forewings are white, suffused with rufous and irrorated (sprinkled) with black in the interspaces. The costal area is pure white, with a slight rufous tinge towards the base. The hindwings are white, faintly tinged with red brown.
