= Prionapteryx albipennis =

Scientific classification
- Kingdom: Animalia
- Phylum: Arthropoda
- Clade: Pancrustacea
- Class: Insecta
- Order: Lepidoptera
- Family: Crambidae
- Subfamily: Crambinae
- Tribe: Ancylolomiini
- Genus: Prionapteryx
- Species: P. albipennis

Binomial name
- Prionapteryx albipennis (Butler, 1886)

Synonyms
- Surattha albipennis Butler, 1886

Species of moth

Prionapteryx albipennis is a moth in the family Crambidae. It was described by Arthur Gardiner Butler in 1886. It is found in India.
