= Prionapteryx splendida =

Scientific classification
- Kingdom: Animalia
- Phylum: Arthropoda
- Clade: Pancrustacea
- Class: Insecta
- Order: Lepidoptera
- Family: Crambidae
- Subfamily: Crambinae
- Tribe: Ancylolomiini
- Genus: Prionapteryx
- Species: P. splendida

Binomial name
- Prionapteryx splendida Bassi & Mey, 2011

Species of moth

Prionapteryx splendida is a moth in the family Crambidae. It was described by Graziano Bassi and Wolfram Mey in 2011. It is found in South Africa, where it has been recorded from both the Eastern Cape and Western Cape.
