= Surattha diffusilinea =

Scientific classification
- Kingdom: Animalia
- Phylum: Arthropoda
- Class: Insecta
- Order: Lepidoptera
- Family: Crambidae
- Subfamily: Crambinae
- Tribe: Ancylolomiini
- Genus: Surattha
- Species: S. diffusilinea

Binomial name
- Surattha diffusilinea Hampson, 1919

Synonyms
- Prionapteryx diffusilinea; Alloea xylochroa Turner, 1947

Species of moth

Surattha diffusilinea is a moth in the family Crambidae. It was described by George Hampson in 1919. It is found in Australia, where it has been recorded from New South Wales.

The forewings are white, faintly tinged with rufous and slightly irrorated (sprinkled) with blackish. There is a black antemedial line and two similar medial lines. The hindwings are white, faintly tinged with rufous.
