= Surattha albostigmata =

Scientific classification
- Domain: Eukaryota
- Kingdom: Animalia
- Phylum: Arthropoda
- Class: Insecta
- Order: Lepidoptera
- Family: Crambidae
- Subfamily: Crambinae
- Tribe: Ancylolomiini
- Genus: Surattha
- Species: S. albostigmata

Binomial name
- Surattha albostigmata Rothschild, 1921

Synonyms
- Prionapteryx albostigmata

Species of moth

Surattha albostigmata is a moth in the family Crambidae. It was described by Rothschild in 1921. It is found in Niger.
