= Surattha albistigma =

Scientific classification
- Domain: Eukaryota
- Kingdom: Animalia
- Phylum: Arthropoda
- Class: Insecta
- Order: Lepidoptera
- Family: Crambidae
- Subfamily: Crambinae
- Tribe: Ancylolomiini
- Genus: Surattha
- Species: S. albistigma

Binomial name
- Surattha albistigma Wileman & South, 1918

Synonyms
- Platytes (Platytesia) alikangiella Strand, 1918

Species of moth

Surattha albistigma is a moth in the family Crambidae. It is found in Taiwan.
