= Surattha nigrifascialis =

Scientific classification
- Kingdom: Animalia
- Phylum: Arthropoda
- Class: Insecta
- Order: Lepidoptera
- Family: Crambidae
- Subfamily: Crambinae
- Tribe: Ancylolomiini
- Genus: Surattha
- Species: S. nigrifascialis

Binomial name
- Surattha nigrifascialis (Walker, 1866)

Synonyms
- Scopula nigrifascialis Walker, 1866; Prionapteryx nigrifascialis; Calarina albirenella Walker, 1866

Species of moth

Surattha nigrifascialis is a moth in the family Crambidae. It is found in India.
