= Surattha obeliscota =

Scientific classification
- Kingdom: Animalia
- Phylum: Arthropoda
- Class: Insecta
- Order: Lepidoptera
- Family: Crambidae
- Subfamily: Crambinae
- Tribe: Ancylolomiini
- Genus: Surattha
- Species: S. obeliscota

Binomial name
- Surattha obeliscota Meyrick, 1936

Synonyms
- Prionapteryx obeliscota (Meyrick 1936)

Species of moth

Surattha obeliscota is a species of moth in the family Crambidae. It is found on Cyprus, as well as in Lebanon.
