= Surattha invectalis =

Scientific classification
- Kingdom: Animalia
- Phylum: Arthropoda
- Class: Insecta
- Order: Lepidoptera
- Family: Crambidae
- Subfamily: Crambinae
- Tribe: Ancylolomiini
- Genus: Surattha
- Species: S. invectalis

Binomial name
- Surattha invectalis (Walker, 1863)

Synonyms
- Prionapteryx invectalis; Pindicitora thysbesalis Walker, 1863

Species of moth

Surattha invectalis is a moth in the family Crambidae. It was described by Francis Walker in 1863. It is found in Sri Lanka, India, Java, Indonesia, Myanmar, and Kenya.

== Description ==
Its wingspan is about 22–30 mm in the male and 26–32 mm in the female. Forewings with veins 4 and 5 stalked. It is a greyish-ochreous moth and irrorated (sprinkled) with fuscous. Forewings with indistinct pale waved antemedial line, with fuscous suffusion on the edges. There are similar, more distinct medial and postmedial lines, where the latter angled on vein 5, the former with dentate dark marks on its outer edge, with latter on its inner. A white spot beyond discocellulars. A marginal black specks series and a line through the cilia. Hindwings pale or dark fuscous, rarely pure white.
