= Surattha carmensita =

Scientific classification
- Domain: Eukaryota
- Kingdom: Animalia
- Phylum: Arthropoda
- Class: Insecta
- Order: Lepidoptera
- Family: Crambidae
- Subfamily: Crambinae
- Tribe: Ancylolomiini
- Genus: Surattha
- Species: S. carmensita

Binomial name
- Surattha carmensita (Błeszyński, 1970)

Synonyms
- Prionapteryx carmensita Błeszyński, 1970

Species of moth

Surattha carmensita is a moth in the family Crambidae. It was described by Stanisław Błeszyński in 1970. It is found in Kenya.
