= Surattha margherita =

Scientific classification
- Domain: Eukaryota
- Kingdom: Animalia
- Phylum: Arthropoda
- Class: Insecta
- Order: Lepidoptera
- Family: Crambidae
- Subfamily: Crambinae
- Tribe: Ancylolomiini
- Genus: Surattha
- Species: S. margherita

Binomial name
- Surattha margherita Błeszyński, 1965

Synonyms
- Prionapteryx margherita

Species of moth

Surattha margherita is a moth in the family Crambidae. It was described by Stanisław Błeszyński in 1965. It is found in Turkey.
