= Surattha africalis =

Scientific classification
- Kingdom: Animalia
- Phylum: Arthropoda
- Class: Insecta
- Order: Lepidoptera
- Family: Crambidae
- Subfamily: Crambinae
- Tribe: Ancylolomiini
- Genus: Surattha
- Species: S. africalis

Binomial name
- Surattha africalis Hampson, 1919

Synonyms
- Prionapteryx alternalis Maes, 2002; Surattha alternalis (Maes, 2002)

Species of moth

Surattha africalis is a species of moth in the family Crambidae. It is found in Kenya, Namibia, South Africa, Sudan and Tanzania.
