= Surattha rufistrigalis =

Scientific classification
- Domain: Eukaryota
- Kingdom: Animalia
- Phylum: Arthropoda
- Class: Insecta
- Order: Lepidoptera
- Family: Crambidae
- Subfamily: Crambinae
- Tribe: Ancylolomiini
- Genus: Surattha
- Species: S. rufistrigalis

Binomial name
- Surattha rufistrigalis Fawcett, 1918

Synonyms
- Prionapteryx rufistrigalis

Species of moth

Surattha rufistrigalis is a moth in the family Crambidae. It is found in Ethiopia and Kenya.
