= Surattha albipunctella =

Scientific classification
- Domain: Eukaryota
- Kingdom: Animalia
- Phylum: Arthropoda
- Class: Insecta
- Order: Lepidoptera
- Family: Crambidae
- Subfamily: Crambinae
- Tribe: Ancylolomiini
- Genus: Surattha
- Species: S. albipunctella

Binomial name
- Surattha albipunctella Marion, 1957

Synonyms
- Prionapteryx albipunctella

Species of moth

Surattha albipunctella is a moth in the family Crambidae. It was described by Hubert Marion in 1957. It is found in Senegal.
