= Surattha strioliger =

Scientific classification
- Kingdom: Animalia
- Phylum: Arthropoda
- Class: Insecta
- Order: Lepidoptera
- Family: Crambidae
- Subfamily: Crambinae
- Tribe: Ancylolomiini
- Genus: Surattha
- Species: S. strioliger

Binomial name
- Surattha strioliger Rothschild, 1913

Synonyms
- Prionapteryx strioliger; Surattha stroblei Amsel, 1954

Species of moth

Surattha strioliger is a moth in the family Crambidae. It is found in Iran, Saudi Arabia and the United Arab Emirates.
