= Charltoniada =

Scientific classification
- Domain: Eukaryota
- Kingdom: Animalia
- Phylum: Arthropoda
- Class: Insecta
- Order: Lepidoptera
- Family: Crambidae
- Subfamily: Crambinae
- Tribe: incertae sedis
- Genus: Charltoniada; Strand, 1918

Genus of moths

Charltoniada is a genus of moths of the family Crambidae.

== Species ==
- Charltoniada acrocapna (Turner, 1911)
- Charltoniada apicella (Hampson, 1896)

== Former species ==
- Charltoniada interstriatellus (Hampson, 1896)
