= Charltoniada apicella =

Scientific classification
- Kingdom: Animalia
- Phylum: Arthropoda
- Class: Insecta
- Order: Lepidoptera
- Family: Crambidae
- Subfamily: Crambinae
- Tribe: incertae sedis
- Genus: Charltoniada
- Species: C. apicella

Binomial name
- Charltoniada apicella (Hampson, 1896)

Synonyms
- Platytes apicella Hampson, 1896

Species of moth

Charltoniada apicella is a moth in the family Crambidae. It was described by George Hampson in 1896. It is found in India (Khasi Hills) and Sri Lanka.

== Description ==
Its wingspan is 24 mm. The head, thorax and abdomen are white and reddish brown. Antennae annulated (ringed) with brown. Forewings whitish, the base of costa, cell, disk and inner area suffused with rufous and irrorated (sprinkled) with brown, leaving a streak below the costa white. There are traces of a highly dentate antemedial line. A black spot found at lower angle of cell. Outer area whitish, the veins streaked with brown. An oblique brown line across apex, then becoming sinuous and slightly waved with a prominent semicircular brown mark beyond it on apical part of costa. A brown marginal line becoming macular (spotted) at the middle. Hindwings white, tinged with fuscous.
