= Classeya hexagona =

Scientific classification
- Kingdom: Animalia
- Phylum: Arthropoda
- Clade: Pancrustacea
- Class: Insecta
- Order: Lepidoptera
- Family: Crambidae
- Subfamily: Crambinae
- Tribe: Calamotrophini
- Genus: Classeya
- Species: C. hexagona

Binomial name
- Classeya hexagona Song & Chen in Chen, Song, Yuan & Zhang, 2002

Species of moth

Classeya hexagona is a moth in the family Crambidae. It was described by Shi-Mei Song and Tie-Mei Chen in 2002. It is found in Yunnan, China.
