= Classeya =

Scientific classification
- Kingdom: Animalia
- Phylum: Arthropoda
- Clade: Pancrustacea
- Class: Insecta
- Order: Lepidoptera
- Family: Crambidae
- Subfamily: Crambinae
- Tribe: Calamotrophini
- Genus: Classeya; Bleszynski, 1960

Genus of moths

Classeya is a genus of moths of the family Crambidae.

== Species ==
- Classeya aphrodite Bleszynski, 1964
- Classeya argyrodonta (Hampson, 1910)
- Classeya bicuspidalis (Hampson, 1919)
- Classeya bleszynskii Bassi, 1999
- Classeya hexagona T.M. Chen & S.M. Song, 2002
- Classeya interstriatellus (Hampson, 1896)
- Classeya luteomarginata Bassi, 1999
- Classeya medea Bleszynski, 1964
- Classeya niveifascialis (Hampson, 1896)
- Classeya placydioni Bleszynski, 1960
- Classeya preissneri Bleszynski, 1964
- Classeya quadricuspis (Hampson, 1919)
- Classeya symetrica Bassi, 1999
- Classeya trichelites (Meyrick, 1936)
