= Classeya quadricuspis =

Scientific classification
- Kingdom: Animalia
- Phylum: Arthropoda
- Clade: Pancrustacea
- Class: Insecta
- Order: Lepidoptera
- Family: Crambidae
- Subfamily: Crambinae
- Tribe: Calamotrophini
- Genus: Classeya
- Species: C. quadricuspis

Binomial name
- Classeya quadricuspis (Hampson, 1919)

Synonyms
- Argyria quadricuspis Hampson, 1919

Species of moth

Classeya quadricuspis is a moth in the family Crambidae. It was described by George Hampson in 1919. It is found in Ethiopia, Kenya and Zambia.
