= Classeya placydioni =

Scientific classification
- Kingdom: Animalia
- Phylum: Arthropoda
- Clade: Pancrustacea
- Class: Insecta
- Order: Lepidoptera
- Family: Crambidae
- Subfamily: Crambinae
- Tribe: Calamotrophini
- Genus: Classeya
- Species: C. placydioni

Binomial name
- Classeya placydioni Błeszyński, 1960

Synonyms
- Classeya palcydioni Chen, Song, Yuan & Zhang, 2002

Species of moth

Classeya placydioni is a moth in the family Crambidae. It was described by Stanisław Błeszyński in 1960. It is found in Senegal.
