= Classeya luteomarginata =

Scientific classification
- Kingdom: Animalia
- Phylum: Arthropoda
- Clade: Pancrustacea
- Class: Insecta
- Order: Lepidoptera
- Family: Crambidae
- Subfamily: Crambinae
- Tribe: Calamotrophini
- Genus: Classeya
- Species: C. luteomarginata

Binomial name
- Classeya luteomarginata Bassi, 1999

Species of moth

Classeya luteomarginata is a moth in the family Crambidae. It was described by Graziano Bassi in 1999. It is found in Nigeria.
