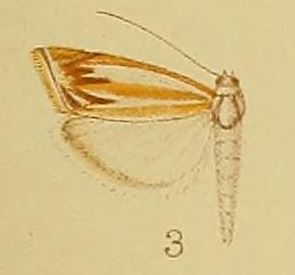

Scientific classification
- Kingdom: Animalia
- Phylum: Arthropoda
- Clade: Pancrustacea
- Class: Insecta
- Order: Lepidoptera
- Family: Crambidae
- Subfamily: Crambinae
- Tribe: Calamotrophini
- Genus: Classeya
- Species: C. argyrodonta

Binomial name
- Classeya argyrodonta (Hampson, 1910)

Synonyms
- Platytes argyrodonta Hampson, 1910; Eschata diplophanes Meyrick, 1933

= Classeya argyrodonta =

Species of moth

Classeya argyrodonta is a moth in the family Crambidae. It was described by George Hampson in 1910. It is found in the Democratic Republic of the Congo, Kenya, Mozambique, South Africa, Zambia and Zimbabwe.
