= Classeya preissneri =

Scientific classification
- Kingdom: Animalia
- Phylum: Arthropoda
- Clade: Pancrustacea
- Class: Insecta
- Order: Lepidoptera
- Family: Crambidae
- Subfamily: Crambinae
- Tribe: Calamotrophini
- Genus: Classeya
- Species: C. preissneri

Binomial name
- Classeya preissneri Błeszyński, 1964

Species of moth

Classeya preissneri is a moth in the family Crambidae. It was described by Stanisław Błeszyński in 1964. It is found in Yunnan, China.
