= Classeya bleszynskii =

Scientific classification
- Kingdom: Animalia
- Phylum: Arthropoda
- Clade: Pancrustacea
- Class: Insecta
- Order: Lepidoptera
- Family: Crambidae
- Subfamily: Crambinae
- Tribe: Calamotrophini
- Genus: Classeya
- Species: C. bleszynskii

Binomial name
- Classeya bleszynskii Bassi, 1999

Species of moth

Classeya bleszynskii is a moth in the family Crambidae. It was described by Graziano Bassi in 1999. It is found in Kenya.
