= Classeya trichelites =

Scientific classification
- Kingdom: Animalia
- Phylum: Arthropoda
- Clade: Pancrustacea
- Class: Insecta
- Order: Lepidoptera
- Family: Crambidae
- Subfamily: Crambinae
- Tribe: Calamotrophini
- Genus: Classeya
- Species: C. trichelites

Binomial name
- Classeya trichelites (Meyrick, 1936)

Synonyms
- Crambus trichelites Meyrick, 1936

Species of moth

Classeya trichelites is a moth in the family Crambidae. It was described by Edward Meyrick in 1936. It is found in the Democratic Republic of the Congo and South Africa.
