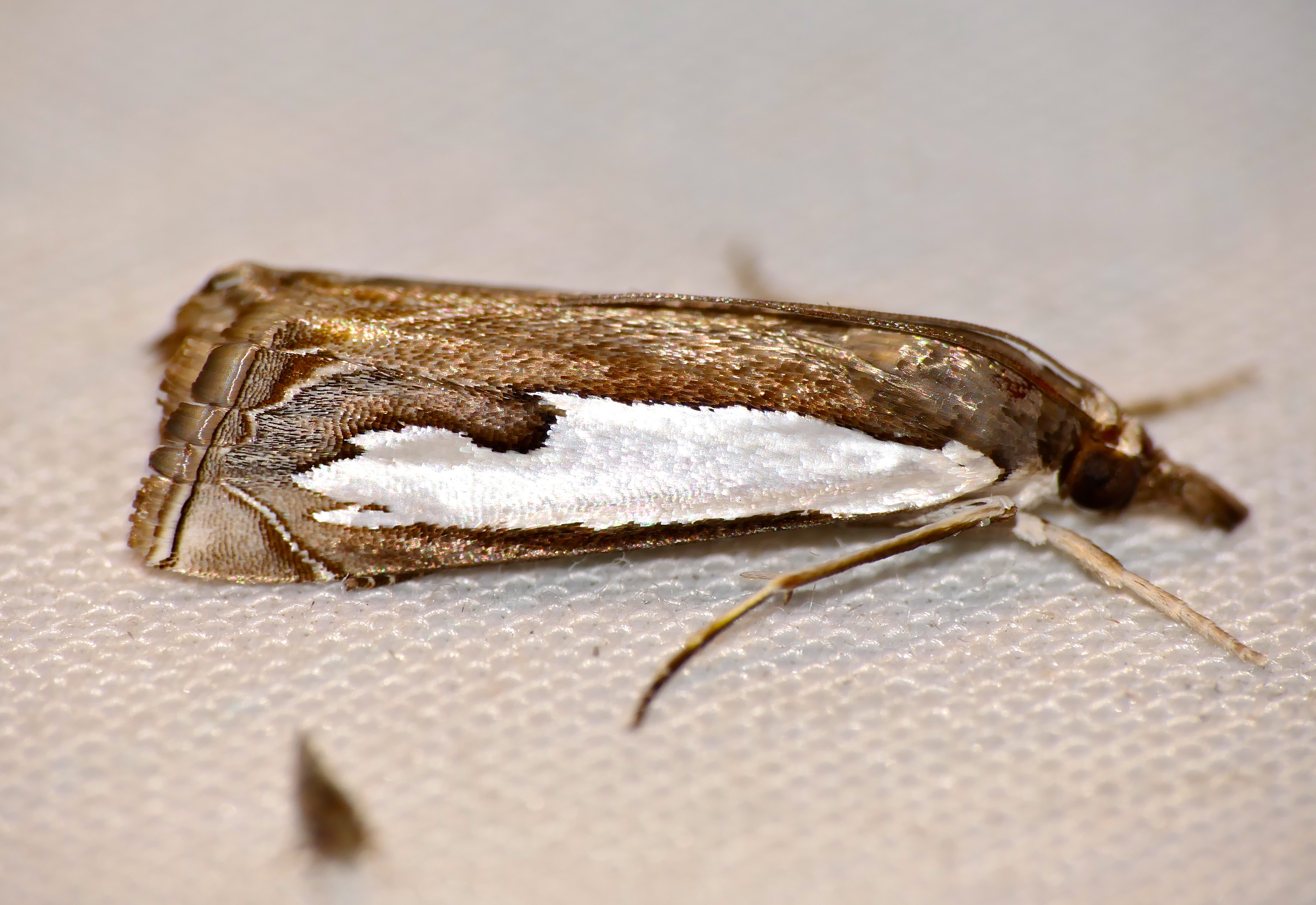

Scientific classification
- Kingdom: Animalia
- Phylum: Arthropoda
- Clade: Pancrustacea
- Class: Insecta
- Order: Lepidoptera
- Family: Crambidae
- Subfamily: Crambinae
- Tribe: Calamotrophini
- Genus: Classeya
- Species: C. bicuspidalis

Binomial name
- Classeya bicuspidalis (Hampson, 1919)

Synonyms
- Argyria bicuspidalis Hampson, 1919

= Classeya bicuspidalis =

Species of moth

Classeya bicuspidalis is a moth in the family Crambidae. It was described by George Hampson in 1919. It is found in the Democratic Republic of the Congo, Malawi, Mozambique and Zimbabwe.
