= Charltoniada acrocapna =

Scientific classification
- Domain: Eukaryota
- Kingdom: Animalia
- Phylum: Arthropoda
- Class: Insecta
- Order: Lepidoptera
- Family: Crambidae
- Subfamily: Crambinae
- Tribe: incertae sedis
- Genus: Charltoniada
- Species: C. acrocapna

Binomial name
- Charltoniada acrocapna (Turner, 1911)

Synonyms
- Microtalis acrocapna Turner, 1911; Charltoniada difficilis Strand, 1918; Crambus apicenotatus Hampson, 1919; Diatraea decorata de Joannis, 1930

Species of moth

Charltoniada acrocapna is a moth in the family Crambidae. It was described by Alfred Jefferis Turner in 1911. It is found in Vietnam, Taiwan and Australia, where it has been recorded from the Northern Territory.
