= List of moths of Australia (Pyralidae) =

Partial list of Australian moths

This is a list of the Australian moth species of the family Pyralidae. It also acts as an index to the species articles and forms part of the full List of moths of Australia.

== Subfamily Chrysauginae ==
- Anassodes mesozonalis (Hampson, 1917)
- Anemosa exanthes (Meyrick, 1885)
- Anemosa isadasalis Walker, 1859
- Hednotodes callichroa Lower, 1893
- Hednotodes metaxantha (Hampson, 1918)
- Polyterpnes polyrrhoda Turner, 1932

== Subfamily Crambinae ==
- Anaclastis apicistrigellus (Meyrick, 1879)
- Ancylolomia westwoodi Zeller, 1863
- Autarotis milvellus (Meyrick, 1879)
- Autarotis polioleuca (Turner, 1911)
- Batiana remotella Walker, 1866
- Bissetia subfumalis (Hampson, 1896)
- Bleszynskia malacelloides (Bleszynski, 1955)
- Calamotropha delatalis (Walker, 1863)
- Calamotropha dielota (Meyrick, 1886)
- Calamotropha haplorus (Turner, 1911)
- Calamotropha leptogrammellus (Meyrick, 1879)
- Calamotropha paludella (Hübner, 1824)
- Catancyla brunnea Hampson, 1919
- Charltoniada acrocapna (Turner, 1911)
- Chilo crypsimetalla (Turner, 1911)
- Conocrambus medioradiellus (Hampson, 1919)
- Conocrambus xuthochroa (Turner, 1947)
- Corynophora argentifascia (Hampson, 1919)
- Corynophora lativittalis (Walker, 1863)
- Corynophora torrentellus (Meyrick, 1879)
- Culladia cuneiferellus (Walker, 1863)
- Culladia hastiferalis (Walker, 1865)
- Deanolis sublimbalis Snellen, 1899
- Diadexia anchylocrossa Turner, 1924
- Diadexia argyropasta Turner, 1911
- Diadexia parodes Turner, 1905
- Epiecia externella Walker, 1866
- Euchromius cornus Schouten, 1990
- Eurhythma argyphea (Turner, 1913)
- Eurhythma callipepla (Turner, 1915)
- Eurhythma cataxia (Turner, 1913)
- Eurhythma epargyra (Turner, 1913)
- Eurhythma latifasciella Turner, 1904
- Eurhythma polyzelota (Turner, 1913)
- Eurhythma xuthospila (Turner, 1913)
- Friedlanderia phaeochorda (Turner, 1911)
- Gadira petraula (Meyrick, 1882)
- Glaucocharis alypophanes (Turner, 1904)
- Glaucocharis dilatella (Meyrick, 1879)
- Glaucocharis microxantha (Meyrick, 1897)
- Glaucocharis molydocrossa (Turner, 1904)
- Glaucocharis ochracealis (Walker, 1866)
- Glaucocharis pauli Gaskin, 1985
- Glaucocharis pogonias (Turner, 1911)
- Glaucocharis queenslandensis (Gaskin, 1975)
- Glaucocharis stenura (Turner, 1904)
- Glaucocharis torva (T.P. Lucas, 1898)
- Hednota acontophora (Meyrick, 1882)
- Hednota ancylosticha Koch, 1966
- Hednota argyroeles (Meyrick, 1882)
- Hednota asterias Meyrick, 1887
- Hednota aurantiacus (Meyrick, 1879)
- Hednota bathrotricha (Lower, 1902)
- Hednota bifractellus (Walker, 1863)
- Hednota bivittella (Donovan, 1805)
- Hednota cotylophora (Turner, 1942)
- Hednota crypsichroa Lower, 1893
- Hednota cyclosema (Lower, 1896)
- Hednota demissalis (Walker, 1863)
- Hednota diacentra (Meyrick, 1897)
- Hednota diargyra (Turner, 1925)
- Hednota dichospila (Turner, 1937)
- Hednota empheres Koch, 1966
- Hednota enchias (Meyrick, 1897)
- Hednota eremenopa (Lower, 1903)
- Hednota grammellus (Zeller, 1863)
- Hednota hagnodes (Turner, 1942)
- Hednota haplotypa (Turner, 1904)
- Hednota hoplitellus (Meyrick, 1879)
- Hednota icelomorpha (Turner, 1906)
- Hednota impletellus (Walker, 1863)
- Hednota invalidellus (Meyrick, 1879)
- Hednota koojanensis Koch, 1966
- Hednota longipalpella (Meyrick, 1879)
- Hednota macroura (Lower, 1902)
- Hednota megalarcha (Meyrick, 1885)
- Hednota mesochra (Lower, 1896)
- Hednota ocypetes Meyrick, 1936
- Hednota odontoides Koch, 1966
- Hednota opulentellus (Zeller, 1863)
- Hednota orthotypa (Turner, 1904)
- Hednota panselenella (Meyrick, 1882)
- Hednota panteucha (Meyrick, 1885)
- Hednota pedionoma (Meyrick, 1885)
- Hednota peripeuces (Turner, 1942)
- Hednota perlatalis (Walker, 1863)
- Hednota pleniferellus (Walker, 1863)
- Hednota polyargyra (Turner, 1913)
- Hednota recurvellus (Walker, 1863)
- Hednota relatalis (Walker, 1863)
- Hednota stenipteralis (Lower, 1903)
- Hednota tenuilineata Koch, 1966
- Hednota thologramma Meyrick, 1936
- Hednota toxotis Meyrick, 1887
- Hednota trissomochla (Turner, 1911)
- Hednota urithrepta (Turner, 1925)
- Hednota xiphosema (Turner, 1904)
- Hednota xylophaea Meyrick, 1887
- Mesolia pelopa (Turner, 1947)
- Mesolia scythrastis Turner, 1904
- Microchilo gelastis (Meyrick, 1887)
- Microtalis epimetalla Turner, 1911
- Neargyria argyraspis (Meyrick, 1879)
- Neargyria persimilis Hampson, 1919
- Neargyrioides aglaopis (Turner, 1911)
- Nechilo macrogona (Lower, 1902)
- Platytes platysticha Turner, 1939
- Platytes poliopepla Lower, 1905
- Prionapteryx diffusilinea (Hampson, 1919)
- Prionapteryx hedyscopa (Lower, 1905)
- Prionapteryx termia (Meyrick, 1885)
- Pseudocatharylla photoleuca (Lower, 1903)
- Ptochostola asaphes Turner, 1937
- Ptochostola dirutellus (Walker, 1866)
- Ptochostola microphaeellus (Walker, 1866)
- Tauroscopa callixutha Turner, 1925
- Tauroscopa lachnaea (Turner, 1913)
- Tawhitia pentadactylus (Zeller, 1863)
- Ubida amochla Turner, 1922
- Ubida hetaerica Turner, 1911
- Ubida holomochla Turner, 1904
- Ubida ramostriellus (Walker, 1863)
- Xubida infusellus (Walker, 1863)

== Subfamily Cybalomiinae ==
- Analcina penthica Turner, 1911
- Apoblepta epicharis Turner, 1911
- Centropseustis astrapora Meyrick, 1890
- Hendecasis melalophalis Hampson, 1906
- Ptychopseustis amoenella (Snellen, 1880)
- Ptychopseustis eutacta (Turner, 1908)
- Ptychopseustis molybdogramma (Hampson, 1919)
- Thyridiphora gilva Turner, 1926
- Trichophysetis crocoplaga Lower, 1903
- Trichophysetis fulvifusalis Lower, 1903
- Trichophysetis neophyla Meyrick, 1884
- Trichophysetis poliochyta Turner, 1911

== Subfamily Endotrichinae ==
- Endosimilis stilbealis (Walker, 1859)
- Endotricha approximalis Snellen, 1895
- Endotricha chionocosma Turner, 1904
- Endotricha dispergens T.P. Lucas, 1891
- Endotricha euphiles Turner, 1932
- Endotricha hemicausta Turner, 1904
- Endotricha ignealis Guenée, 1854
- Endotricha lobibasalis Hampson, 1906
- Endotricha melanchroa Turner, 1911
- Endotricha mesenterialis (Walker, 1859)
- Endotricha occidentalis Hampson, 1916
- Endotricha psammitis Turner, 1904
- Endotricha puncticostalis (Walker, 1866)
- Endotricha pyrosalis Guenée, 1854
- Endotricha pyrrhocosma Turner, 1911
- Larodryas haplocala Turner, 1922
- Oenogenes congrualis (Walker, 1866)
- Oenogenes fugalis (R. Felder & Rogenhofer, 1875)
- Persicoptera aglaopa (Meyrick, 1887)
- Persicoptera baryptera (Lower, 1905)
- Persicoptera callimochla (Turner, 1913)
- Persicoptera compsopa (Meyrick, 1887)
- Persicoptera desmotoma (Lower, 1903)
- Persicoptera dinosticha (Turner, 1937)
- Persicoptera iochyta (Turner, 1911)
- Persicoptera pulchrinalis (Guenée, 1854)
- Persicoptera scioides (Turner, 1932)

== Subfamily Epipaschiinae ==
- Agastophanes zophoxysta Turner, 1937
- Araeopaschia demotis (Meyrick, 1887)
- Araeopaschia normalis (Hampson, 1906)
- Araeopaschia rufescentalis Hampson, 1906
- Astrapometis saburalis (Walker, 1859)
- Austropaschia porrigens Hampson, 1916
- Axiocrita cataphanes Turner, 1913
- Canipsa poliochyta (Turner, 1904)
- Catamola funerea (Walker, 1863)
- Catamola xanthomelalis (Walker, 1863)
- Doddiana callizona (Lower, 1896)
- Lacalma albirufalis (Hampson, 1916)
- Lacalma ferrealis (Hampson, 1906)
- Lacalma mniomima (Turner, 1913)
- Lacalma papuensis (Warren, 1891)
- Lacalma poryphryealis (Kenrick, 1907)
- Mimaglossa amauropis (Turner, 1926)
- Mimaglossa crypserythra (Turner, 1904)
- Mimaglossa habitalis (Guenée, 1854)
- Mimaglossa nauplialis (Walker, 1859)
- Mimaglossa zophera (Turner, 1904)
- Nyctereutica asbolopis Turner, 1904
- Nyctereutica capnopis (Meyrick, 1885)
- Nyctereutica elassota (Meyrick, 1884)
- Nyctereutica melanophorella (Walker, 1866)
- Nyctereutica tephrophanes (Turner, 1937)
- Nyctereutica tornotis (Meyrick, 1887)
- Nyctereutica tympanophora (Turner, 1904)
- Odontopaschia ecnomia Turner, 1913
- Orthaga amphimelas Turner, 1913
- Orthaga chloanthes (Turner, 1913)
- Orthaga exvinacea (Hampson, 1891)
- Orthaga lithochroa Hampson, 1916
- Orthaga phaeopteralis Lower, 1902
- Orthaga picta (Warren, 1895)
- Orthaga polyscia (Turner, 1913)
- Orthaga rubridiscalis Hampson, 1906
- Orthaga seminivea (Warren, 1895)
- Orthaga thyrisalis (Walker, 1858)
- Poliopaschia brachypalpia Hampson, 1916
- Poliopaschia lithochlora (Lower, 1896)
- Pseudocera trissosticha (Turner, 1932)
- Salma apicalis (Kenrick, 1907)
- Salma basiochra (Turner, 1937)
- Salma cholica (Meyrick, 1884)
- Salma cletolis (Turner, 1905)
- Salma ebenina (Turner, 1904)
- Salma eupepla (Turner, 1915)
- Salma galeata (Hampson, 1906)
- Salma glyceropa (Turner, 1937)
- Salma hicanodes (Turner, 1937)
- Salma marmorea (Warren, 1891)
- Salma mnesibrya (Meyrick, 1884)
- Salma nephelodes (Turner, 1933)
- Salma nubilalis (Hampson, 1893)
- Salma peloscia (Turner, 1913)
- Salma pentabela (Turner, 1915)
- Salma peratophaea (Turner, 1937)
- Salma poliophanes (Turner, 1913)
- Salma pyrastis (Meyrick, 1887)
- Salma recurvalis Walker, 1863
- Salma streptomela (Lower, 1896)
- Salma tholoessa (Turner, 1926)
- Spectrotrota fimbrialis Warren, 1891
- Stericta aeruginosa T.P. Lucas, 1894
- Stericta atribasalis Warren, 1895
- Stericta bryomima (Turner, 1913)
- Stericta carbonalis (Guenée, 1854)
- Stericta chlorophoena Turner, 1913
- Stericta concisella (Walker, 1866)
- Stericta dochmoscia (Turner, 1905)
- Stericta mediovialis Hampson, 1916
- Stericta orchidivora (Turner, 1904)
- Stericta philobrya (Turner, 1937)
- Stericta prasina Warren, 1895
- Termioptycha Meyrick, 1889
- Termioptycha eucarta (R. Felder & Rogenhofer, 1875)
- Titanoceros cataxantha Meyrick, 1884
- Titanoceros heliodryas Meyrick, 1933
- Titanoceros thermoptera (Lower, 1903)

== Subfamily Evergestinae ==
- Crocidolomia luteolalis Hampson, 1893
- Crocidolomia pavonana (Fabricius, 1794)
- Crocidolomia suffusalis (Hampson, 1891)

== Subfamily Galleriinae ==
- Achroia grisella (Fabricius, 1794)
- Aphomia baryptera (Lower, 1901)
- Aphomia erumpens T.P. Lucas, 1898
- Aphomia homochroa (Turner, 1905)
- Aphomia poliocyma Turner, 1937
- Aphomia sociella (Linnaeus, 1758)
- Bapara agasta (Turner, 1911)
- Callionyma sarcodes Meyrick, 1883
- Corcyra cephalonica (Stainton, 1866)
- Dinopleura lineata Turner, 1941
- Doloessa hilaropis (Meyrick, 1897)
- Doloessa ochrociliella (Ragonot, 1893)
- Doloessa viridis Zeller, 1848
- Galleria mellonella (Linnaeus, 1758)
- Galleristhenia biangularis (Turner, 1941)
- Galleristhenia idioptila (Turner, 1915)
- Galleristhenia mellonidiella Hampson, 1917
- Galleristhenia sporadica (Turner, 1947)
- Heteromicta aegidia (Meyrick, 1887)
- Heteromicta alypeta Turner, 1911
- Heteromicta leucospila (Lower, 1907)
- Heteromicta melanomochla (Hampson, 1917)
- Heteromicta myrmecophila (Turner, 1905)
- Heteromicta nigricostella Hampson, 1901
- Heteromicta ochraceella Hampson, 1901
- Heteromicta pachytera (Meyrick, 1880)
- Heteromicta phloeomima (Turner, 1911)
- Heteromicta poeodes Turner, 1905
- Heteromicta poliostola Turner, 1904
- Heteromicta sordidella (Walker, 1866)
- Heteromicta tripartitella (Meyrick, 1880)
- Hypolophota amydrastis Turner, 1904
- Hypolophota oodes Turner, 1904
- Lamoria eumeces (Turner, 1913)
- Lamoria idiolepida Turner, 1922
- Lamoria oenochroa Turner, 1905
- Lamoria pachylepidella Hampson, 1901
- Mampava rhodoneura (Turner, 1905)
- Mecistophylla agramma (Lower, 1903)
- Mecistophylla amechanica Turner, 1941
- Mecistophylla asthenitis (Turner, 1904)
- Mecistophylla disema (Lower, 1905)
- Mecistophylla ebenopasta (Turner, 1904)
- Mecistophylla psara Turner, 1937
- Mecistophylla spodoptera (Lower, 1907)
- Mecistophylla stenopepla (Turner, 1904)
- Meyriccia latro (Zeller, 1873)
- Paralipsa gularis (Zeller, 1877)
- Picrogama semifoedalis (Walker, 1866)
- Prosthenia xyloryctella Hampson, 1917
- Tirathaba catharopa (Turner, 1937)
- Tirathaba cissinobaphes (Turner, 1906)
- Tirathaba leucostictalis (Lower, 1903)
- Tirathaba monoleuca (Lower, 1894)
- Tirathaba parasiticus (T.P. Lucas, 1898)
- Tirathaba pseudocomplana Hampson, 1917
- Tirathaba psolopasta (Turner, 1913)
- Tirathaba rufivena (Walker, 1864)
- Tirathaba ruptilinea (Walker, 1866)
- Tirathaba xuthoptera (Turner, 1937)

== Subfamily Glaphyriinae ==
- Hellula hydralis Guenée, 1854
- Hellula undalis (Fabricius, 1781)

== Subfamily Midilinae ==
- Dolichobela celidograpta Turner, 1932
- Styphlolepis agenor Turner, 1915
- Styphlolepis delopasta Turner, 1942
- Styphlolepis erythrocosma Turner, 1942
- Styphlolepis hypermegas Turner, 1922
- Styphlolepis leucosticta Hampson, 1919
- Styphlolepis squamosalis Hampson, 1896

== Subfamily Musotiminae ==
- Baeoptila leptorrhoda (Turner, 1908)
- Baeoptila oculalis (Hampson, 1897)
- Baeoptila selenias Turner, 1908
- Drosophantis caeruleata (Hampson, 1893)
- Elachypteryx callidryas (Turner, 1922)
- Elachypteryx erebenna Turner, 1908
- Musotima acrias Meyrick, 1884
- Musotima leucomma (Hampson, 1917)
- Musotima nitidalis (Walker, 1866)
- Musotima ochropteralis (Guenée, 1854)
- Musotima pudica (T.P. Lucas, 1894)
- Musotima suffusalis (Hampson, 1893)

== Subfamily Noordinae ==
- Noorda blitealis Walker, 1859

== Subfamily Nymphulinae ==
- Ambia ptolycusalis Walker, 1859
- Anydraula glycerialis (Walker, 1859)
- Anydraula pericompsa (Turner, 1915)
- Araeomorpha diplopa (Lower, 1903)
- Araeomorpha limnophila Turner, 1937
- Cataclysta camptozonale (Hampson, 1897)
- Cataclysta lampetialis Walker, 1859
- Cataclysta marginipuncta Turner, 1937
- Cataclysta melanolitha (Turner, 1908)
- Cataclysta metastictalis (Hampson, 1917)
- Cataclysta polyrrapha Turner, 1937
- Cataclysta psathyrodes Turner, 1908
- Elophila aristodora (Turner, 1908)
- Elophila difflualis (Snellen, 1880)
- Elophila responsalis (Walker, 1866)
- Eoophyla argyrilinale (Hampson, 1897)
- Hygraula nitens (Butler, 1880)
- Hygraula pelochyta Turner, 1937
- Hylebatis scintillifera Turner, 1908
- Margarosticha euprepialis Hampson, 1917
- Margarosticha repetitalis (Warren, 1896)
- Margarosticha sphenotis Meyrick, 1887
- Neoschoenobia caustodes (Meyrick, 1934)
- Nyctiplanes polypenthes Turner, 1937
- Nymphicula adelphalis Agassiz, 2014
- Nymphicula christinae Agassiz, 2014
- Nymphicula conjunctalis Agassiz, 2014
- Nymphicula edwardsi Agassiz, 2014
- Nymphicula hampsoni Agassiz, 2014
- Nymphicula ochrepunctalis Agassiz, 2014
- Nymphicula queenslandica (Hampson, 1917)
- Nymphicula torresalis Agassiz, 2014
- Paracataclysta fuscalis (Hampson, 1893)
- Parapoynx affinialis Guenée, 1854
- Parapoynx crisonalis (Walker, 1859)
- Parapoynx dentizonalis (Hampson, 1897)
- Parapoynx diminutalis Snellen, 1880
- Parapoynx discoloralis (Walker, 1866)
- Parapoynx epimochla (Turner, 1908)
- Parapoynx euryscia (Meyrick, 1885)
- Parapoynx fluctuosalis (Zeller, 1952)
- Parapoynx medusalis (Walker, 1859)
- Parapoynx polydectalis (Walker, 1859)
- Parapoynx sinuosa (T.P. Lucas, 1892)
- Parapoynx stagnalis (Zeller, 1852)
- Parapoynx tenebralis (Lower, 1902)
- Parapoynx tullialis (Walker, 1859)
- Parapoynx villidalis (Walker, 1859)
- Strepsinoma amaura Meyrick, 1897
- Strepsinoma foveata Turner, 1937
- Tetrernia terminitis Meyrick, 1890
- Theila distributa (T.P. Lucas, 1898)
- Theila metallosticha (Turner, 1938)
- Theila siennata (Warren, 1896)
- Theila triplaga (Lower, 1903)

== Subfamily Odontiinae ==
- Autocharis hedyphaes (Turner, 1913)
- Autocharis miltosoma (Turner, 1937)
- Autocharis mimetica (Lower, 1903)
- Autocharis molybdis (Lower, 1903)
- Boeotarcha divisa (T.P. Lucas, 1894)
- Boeotarcha taenialis (Snellen, 1880)
- Canuza acmias Meyrick, 1897
- Canuza euspilella Walker, 1866
- Clupeosoma astrigalis Hampson, 1917
- Clupeosoma pellucidalis Snellen, 1880
- Eurrhypis pollinalis (Denis & Schiffermüller, 1775)
- Hemiscopis violacea (T.P. Lucas, 1892)
- Heortia vitessoides (Moore, 1885)
- Hydrorybina polusalis (Walker, 1859)
- Pseudonoorda hemileuca (Turner, 1933)
- Pseudonoorda metalloma (Lower, 1903)
- Syntonarcha iriastis Meyrick, 1890
- Syntonarcha vulnerata T.P. Lucas, 1894
- Taurometopa haematographa (Hampson, 1917)
- Taurometopa phoenicozona (Hampson, 1917)
- Thesaurica argentifera (Hampson, 1913)
- Trigonoorda gavisalis (Walker, 1869)
- Trigonoorda psarochroa (Turner, 1908)
- Trigonoorda rhodea (Lower, 1905)
- Trigonoorda rhodopa (Turner, 1908)
- Trigonoorda trygoda (Meyrick, 1897)

== Subfamily Peoriinae ==
- Anchylobela acidnias (Turner, 1904)
- Anchylobela dyseimata (Turner, 1913)
- Anchylobela haplodes Turner, 1947
- Anchylobela holophaea (Turner, 1905)
- Anchylobela nitens (Butler, 1886)
- Anchylobela phaulodes (Turner, 1947)
- Comorta plinthina (Turner, 1905)
- Comorta zophopleura (Turner, 1904)
- Emmalocera apotomella (Meyrick, 1879)
- Emmalocera approximella (Hampson, 1918)
- Emmalocera biseriella (Hampson, 1901)
- Emmalocera callirrhoda (Turner, 1904)
- Emmalocera ctenucha (Turner, 1913)
- Emmalocera dimochla (Turner, 1947)
- Emmalocera distictella (Hampson, 1918)
- Emmalocera eremochroa Hampson, 1918
- Emmalocera eurysticha (Turner, 1904)
- Emmalocera euryzona (Meyrick, 1883)
- Emmalocera haploschema (Turner, 1904)
- Emmalocera holochra (Turner, 1904)
- Emmalocera icasmopis (Turner, 1904)
- Emmalocera laropis (Turner, 1913)
- Emmalocera latilimbella (Ragonot, 1890)
- Emmalocera longiramella Hampson, 1901
- Emmalocera macrorrhynca (Turner, 1923)
- Emmalocera marcida (Turner, 1923)
- Emmalocera minoralis (Lower, 1903)
- Emmalocera neotomella (Meyrick, 1879)
- Emmalocera niphopleura (Turner, 1913)
- Emmalocera niphosema (Turner, 1913)
- Emmalocera pelochroa (Turner, 1947)
- Emmalocera platymochla (Turner, 1947)
- Emmalocera pleurochorda (Turner, 1913)
- Emmalocera radiatella Hampson, 1901
- Emmalocera rhabdota (Turner, 1904)
- Emmalocera rhodoessa (Turner, 1904)
- Emmalocera stereosticha (Turner, 1905)
- Emmalocera syssema (Turner, 1913)
- Emmalocera thiomochla (Turner, 1947)
- Emmalocera transecta (Turner, 1947)
- Fossifrontia leuconeurella Hampson, 1901
- Heosphora ablepta (Turner, 1913)
- Heosphora achromatella (Hampson, 1918)
- Heosphora anaemopis (Turner, 1913)
- Heosphora baliora (Turner, 1913)
- Heosphora colobela (Turner, 1947)
- Heosphora desertella (Hampson, 1918)
- Heosphora enervella (Hampson, 1901)
- Heosphora erasmia (Turner, 1913)
- Heosphora grammivena (Hampson, 1918)
- Heosphora leuconeura (Turner, 1913)
- Heosphora minimella (Hampson, 1901)
- Heosphora neurica (Turner, 1913)
- Heosphora psamathella (Meyrick, 1879)
- Heosphora rhodochros (Turner, 1947)
- Heosphora tanybela (Turner, 1947)
- Heosphora virginella (Meyrick, 1879)
- Heosphora xylodes (Turner, 1947)
- Lioprosopa adenocera (Turner, 1923)
- Lioprosopa albivena (Turner, 1947)
- Lioprosopa amictodes (Turner, 1947)
- Lioprosopa argosticha (Turner, 1913)
- Lioprosopa haploa Turner, 1947
- Lioprosopa microrrhoda (Turner, 1923)
- Lioprosopa neuricella (Hampson, 1918)
- Lioprosopa poliosticha Turner, 1947
- Lioprosopa rhadinodes Turner, 1947
- Lioprosopa rhantista Turner, 1947
- Lioprosopa rhodobaphella (Ragonot, 1888)
- Lioprosopa rhodosticha (Turner, 1904)

== Subfamily Phycitinae ==
=== Anerastiini ===
- Anerastia metallactis Meyrick, 1887
- Calamotropa pulverivena Hampson, 1918

=== Cabniini ===
- Ernophthora milicha Turner, 1931
- Ernophthora phoenicias Meyrick, 1887
- Ernophthora schematica (Turner, 1947)
- Euageta dianipha (Lower, 1902)

=== Cryptoblabini ===
- Balanomis encyclia Meyrick, 1887
- Berastagia dissolutella (Snellen, 1880)
- Cryptadia xuthobela Turner, 1913
- Cryptoblabes adoceta Turner, 1904
- Cryptoblabes albocostalis (T.P. Lucas, 1892)
- Cryptoblabes alphitias Turner, 1913
- Cryptoblabes euraphella (Meyrick, 1879)
- Cryptoblabes hemigypsa Turner, 1913
- Cryptoblabes plagioleuca Turner, 1904
- Cryptoblabes poliella (Lower, 1905)
- Procunea siderea Hampson, 1930

The following species belongs to the tribe Cryptoblabini, but has not been assigned to a genus yet. Given here is the original name given to the species when it was first described:

- Cryptoblabes ferrealis Lower, 1902

=== Phycitini ===
- Abareia amaurodes (Turner, 1947)
- Acrobasis epaxia (Turner, 1947)
- Acrobasis ereboscopa (Lower, 1903)
- Acrobasis mniaropis (Turner, 1904)
- Acrobasis olivalis (Hampson, 1896)
- Addyme ferrorubella (Walker, 1864)
- Ammatucha lathria Turner, 1922
- Ancylodes lapsalis (Walker, 1859)
- Ancylodes penicillata Turner, 1905
- Ancylosis ianthemis (Meyrick, 1887)
- Ancylosis rufifasciella (Hampson, 1901)
- Ancylosis thiosticha Turner, 1947
- Anonaepestis bengalella Ragonot, 1894
- Arcola malloi Pastrana, 1961
- Asarta fuliginosa (Turner, 1841)
- Asclerobia flavitinctella (Ragonot, 1893)
- Assara aterpes (Turner, 1913)
- Assara cataxutha (Turner, 1947)
- Assara chionopleura (Turner, 1947)
- Assara holophragma (Meyrick, 1887)
- Assara leucarma (Meyrick, 1879)
- Assara melanomita (Turner, 1947)
- Assara microdoxa (Meyrick, 1879)
- Assara odontosema (Turner, 1913)
- Assara proleuca (Lower, 1903)
- Assara quadriguttella (Walker, 1866)
- Assara semifictile (Turner, 1913)
- Assara seminivale (Turner, 1904)
- Assara subarcuella (Meyrick, 1879)
- Aurana actiosella Walker, 1863
- Barbifrontia hemileucella Hampson, 1901
- Bradyrrhoa gilveolella (Treitschke, 1833)
- Cactoblastis cactorum (Berg, 1885)
- Cactoblastis doddi Heinrich, 1939
- Cadra acuta Horak, 1994
- Cadra cautella (Walker, 1863)
- Cadra corniculata Horak, 1994
- Cadra figulilella (Gregson, 1871)
- Cadra perfasciata Horak, 1994
- Cadra reniformis Horak, 1994
- Cadra rugosa Horak, 1994
- Calguia defiguralis Walker, 1863
- Calguia deltophora (Lower, 1903)
- Cathyalia fulvella Ragonot, 1888
- Cathyalia pallicostalis (Walker, 1863)
- Cavipalpia argentilavella (Hampson, 1901)
- Ceutholopha petalocosma (Meyrick, 1882)
- Conobathra corethropus (Turner, 1904)
- Conobathra hemichlaena (Meyrick, 1887)
- Copamyntis ceroprepiella (Hampson, 1901)
- Copamyntis infusella (Meyrick, 1879)
- Copamyntis leptocosma (Turner, 1904)
- Copamyntis prays (Turner, 1947)
- Copamyntis spodoptila (Turner, 1913)
- Creobota apodectum (Turner, 1904)
- Creobota grossipunctella (Ragonot, 1888)
- Crocydopora cinigerella (Walker, 1866)
- Cryptomyelois glaucobasis (Lower, 1903)
- Ctenomeristis almella (Meyrick, 1879)
- Ctenomeristis subfuscella (Hampson, 1901)
- Dialepta micropolia Turner, 1913
- Ecbletodes psephenias Turner, 1904
- Ecnomoneura sphaerotropha Turner, 1942
- Ectomyelois ceratoniae (Zeller, 1839)
- Encryphodes aenictopa Turner, 1913
- Ephestia elutella (Hübner, 1796)
- Ephestia kuehniella (Zeller, 1879)
- Ephestiopsis oenobarella (Meyrick, 1879)
- Epicrocis metallopa (Lower, 1898)
- Eremographa sebasmia (Meyrick, 1887)
- Etiella behrii (Zeller, 1848)
- Etiella chrysoporella Meyrick, 1879
- Etiella grisea Hampson, 1903
- Etiella hobsoni (Butler, 1881)
- Etiella scitivittalis (Walker, 1863)
- Etiella walsinghamella Ragonot, 1888
- Etiella zinckenella (Treitschke, 1832)
- Eucampyla etheiella Meyrick, 1882
- Euzophera flavicosta Turner, 1947
- Euzopherodes albicans Hampson, 1899
- Euzopherodes allocrossa Lower, 1903
- Euzopherodes homocapna Turner, 1947
- Faveria dasyptera (Lower, 1903)
- Faveria laiasalis Walker, 1859
- Faveria leucophaeella (Zeller, 1867)
- Faveria oppositalis (Walker, 1863)
- Faveria tritalis (Walker, 1863)
- Heterochrosis molybdophora (Lower, 1903)
- Homoeosoma albicosta (Turner, 1947)
- Homoeosoma atechna Turner, 1947
- Homoeosoma centrosticha Turner, 1947
- Homoeosoma contracta Turner, 1947
- Homoeosoma fornacella (Meyrick, 1879)
- Homoeosoma ischnopa (Turner, 1947)
- Homoeosoma lechriosema Turner, 1947
- Homoeosoma pelosticta Turner, 1947
- Homoeosoma phaulopa (Turner, 1947)
- Homoeosoma stenopis Turner, 1904
- Homoeosoma vagella Zeller, 1848
- Hypargyria metalliferella Ragonot, 1888
- Hypsipyla robusta (Moore, 1886)
- Indomalayia flabellifera (Hampson, 1896)
- Indomyrlaea auchmodes (Turner, 1905)
- Lasiosticha antelia (Meyrick, 1885)
- Lasiosticha canilinea (Meyrick, 1879)
- Lasiosticha microcosma Lower, 1893
- Lasiosticha opimella (Meyrick, 1879)
- Lasiosticha thermochroa (Lower, 1896)
- Lophothoracia omphalella Hampson, 1901
- Lophothoracia orthozona (Lower, 1903)
- Magiria imparella Zeller, 1867
- Medaniaria adiacritis (Turner, 1904)
- Melitara dentata (Grote, 1876)
- Melitara prodenialis Walker, 1863
- Mesciniadia aenicta (Turner, 1913)
- Mesciniadia infractalis (Walker, 1864)
- Mesciniadia otoptila (Turner, 1913)
- Metallosticha pamphaes (Turner, 1904)
- Meyrickiella homosema (Meyrick, 1887)
- Nephopterix capnoessa (Turner, 1904)
- Nephopterix chryserythra (Lower, 1902)
- Nephopterix habrostola Lower, 1905
- Nephopterix hemibaphes (Turner, 1905)
- Nephopterix melanostyla Meyrick, 1879
- Nephopterix piratis (Meyrick, 1887)
- Nephopterix placoxantha (Lower, 1898)
- Nephopterix thermalopha Lower, 1903
- Olycella junctolineella (Hulst, 1900)
- Oxydisia hyperythrella Hampson, 1901
- Parramatta ensiferella (Meyrick, 1879)
- Parramatta taliella (Hampson, 1901)
- Patagoniodes farinaria (Turner, 1904)
- Phycita eulepidella Hampson, 1896
- Phycita rhapta (Turner, 1947)
- Phycita trachystola Turner, 1904
- Phycitodes delineata (T.P. Lucas, 1892)
- Phycitodes melanosticta (Lower, 1903)
- Plodia interpunctella (Hübner, 1813)
- Protoetiella cryptadia (Turner, 1913)
- Protoetiella venustella (Hampson, 1896)
- Ptyobathra atrisquamella (Hampson, 1901)
- Ptyobathra hades (Lower, 1903)
- Ptyobathra hypolepidota Turner, 1905
- Ptyomaxia amaura (Lower, 1902)
- Ptyomaxia metasarca (Lower, 1903)
- Ptyomaxia syntaractis Turner, 1904
- Ptyomaxia trigonogramma (Turner, 1947)
- Sempronia stygella Ragonot, 1888
- Stereobela leucomera Turner, 1905
- Symphonistis monospila (Lower, 1902)
- Syntypica aleurodes Turner, 1905
- Syntypica phaeochiton (Turner, 1947)
- Syntypica stereochorda (Turner, 1947)
- Trissonca mesactella (Meyrick, 1879)
- Trychnocrana abditiva Turner, 1925
- Trychnocrana mixoleuca (Turner, 1904)
- Tucumania tapiacola Dyar, 1925
- Tylochares cosmiella (Meyrick, 1879)
- Tylochares endophaga Turner, 1947
- Tylochares eremonoma Turner, 1913
- Tylochares goniosticha Turner, 1915
- Tylochares gypsotypa Turner, 1947
- Tylochares melanodes (Hampson, 1930)
- Tylochares sceptucha Turner, 1904
- Unadillides distichella (Meyrick, 1878)
- Unadophanes apatelia (Turner, 1905)
- Unadophanes atecmarta (Turner, 1913)
- Unadophanes trissomita (Turner, 1913)
- Vinicia gypsopa (Meyrick, 1883)
- Vinicia macrota (Meyrick, 1887)

The following species belong to the tribe Phycitini, but have not been assigned to a genus yet. Given here is the original name given to the species when it was first described:

- Salebria eucometis Meyrick, 1882
- Epicrocis mesembrina Meyrick, 1887
- Pempelia oculiferella Meyrick, 1879
- Epicrocis poliochyta Turner, 1924

=== Unplaced to tribe ===
- Masthala favillalella Walker, 1864

== Subfamily Pyralinae ==
=== Pyralini ===
- Aglossa caprealis (Hübner, 1809)
- Aglossa pinguinalis (Linnaeus, 1758)
- Amphiderita pyrospila Turner, 1925
- Arescoptera idiotypa Turner, 1911
- Arippara disticha (Turner, 1904)
- Cardamyla carinentalis Walker, 1859
- Cardamyla didymalis Walker, 1859
- Cardamyla eurycroca Turner, 1937
- Cardamyla hercophora (Meyrick, 1884)
- Curena caustopa (Turner, 1905)
- Curena externalis Walker, 1866
- Gauna aegusalis (Walker, 1858)
- Gauna flavibasalis (Hampson, 1906)
- Gauna phaealis (Hampson, 1906)
- Herculia nigrivitta (Walker, 1863)
- Hypsopygia flavamaculata Shaffer, Nielsen & Horak, 1996
- Hypsopygia mauritialis (Boisduval, 1833)
- Loryma recusata (Walker, 1863)
- Macna coelocrossa (Turner, 1911)
- Macna oppositalis (Walker, 1866)
- Ocrasa acerasta (Turner, 1904)
- Ocrasa albidalis Walker, 1866
- Ocrasa chytriodes (Turner, 1911)
- Ocrasa decoloralis (Lederer, 1863)
- Ocrasa repetita (Butler, 1887)
- Perisseretma orthotis (Meyrick, 1894)
- Pyralis caustica (Meyrick, 1884)
- Pyralis farinalis Linnaeus, 1758
- Pyralis manihotalis Guenée, 1854
- Pyralis pictalis (Curtis, 1834)
- Scenedra decoratalis (Walker, 1866)
- Scenidiopis chionozyga (Lower, 1903)
- Tanaobela chrysochlora Turner, 1915
- Vitessa glaucoptera Hampson, 1906
- Vitessa plumosa Hampson, 1896
- Vitessa zemire (Stoll, 1781)

== Subfamily Pyraustinae ==
=== Pyraustini ===
- Achyra affinitalis (Lederer, 1863)
- Achyra massalis (Walker, 1859)
- Achyra nigrirenalis (Hampson, 1913)
- Achyra serrulata (Turner, 1932)
- Circobotys occultilinea (Walker, 1863)
- Coelobathra ochromorpha (Lower, 1902)
- Crypsiptya coclesalis (Walker, 1859)
- Ebulea epicroca (Lower, 1903)
- Ebulea perflavalis (Hampson, 1913)
- Emphylica xanthocrossa Turner, 1913
- Euclasta gigantalis Viette, 1957
- Euclasta maceratalis Lederer, 1863
- Hyalobathra aequalis (Lederer, 1863)
- Hyalobathra archeleuca Meyrick, 1885
- Hyalobathra brevialis (Walker, 1859)
- Hyalobathra illectalis (Walker, 1859)
- Hyalobathra minialis (Warren, 1895)
- Hyalobathra miniosalis (Guenée, 1854)
- Hyalobathra paupellalis (Lederer, 1863)
- Isocentris charopalis Swinhoe, 1907
- Isocentris filalis (Guenée, 1854)
- Lamprophaia ablactalis (Walker, 1859)
- Lamprophaia albifimbrialis (Walker, 1866)
- Loxomorpha flavidissimalis (Grote, 1878)
- Mabra eryxalis (Walker, 1859)
- Ostrinia furnacalis (Guenée, 1854)
- Pagyda botydalis (Snellen, 1880)
- Pagyda schaliphora Hampson, 1898
- Paliga damastesalis (Walker, 1859)
- Paliga ignealis (Walker, 1866)
- Paliga mandronalis (Walker, 1859)
- Paliga quadrigalis (Hering, 1901)
- Paliga rubicundalis Warren, 1896
- Pyrausta ignealis (Hampson, 1899)
- Pyrausta oenochrois (Meyrick, 1889)
- Pyrausta panopealis (Walker, 1859)
- Pyrausta testalis (Fabricius, 1794)
- Uresiphita insulicola (Turner, 1918)
- Uresiphita ornithopteralis (Guenée, 1854)

=== Spilomelini ===
- Aboetheta pteridonoma Turner, 1914
- Acicys cladaropa Turner, 1911
- Aethaloessa calidalis (Guenée, 1854)
- Aetholix flavibasalis (Guenée, 1854)
- Agathodes paliscia Turner, 1908
- Agrioglypta deliciosa (Butler, 1887)
- Agrioglypta eurytusalis (Walker, 1859)
- Agrioglypta excelsalis (Walker, 1866)
- Agrioglypta itysalis (Walker, 1859)
- Agrioglypta zelimalis (Walker, 1859)
- Agrotera amathealis (Walker, 1859)
- Agrotera basinotata Hampson, 1891
- Agrotera glycyphanes Turner, 1913
- Agrotera ignepicta Hampson, 1898
- Agrotera pictalis (Warren, 1896)
- Analyta albicillalis Lederer, 1863
- Antigastra catalaunalis (Duponchel, 1833)
- Aphytoceros lucusalis (Walker, 1859)
- Aporocosmus lamprodeta (Meyrick, 1886)
- Archernis callixantha Meyrick, 1886
- Arthroschista hilaralis (Walker, 1859)
- Arxama cretacealis Hampson, 1906
- Ategumia adipalis (Lederer, 1863)
- Atelocentra chloraspis Meyrick, 1884
- Auchmophoba tynnuta Turner, 1913
- Bacotoma camillusalis (Walker, 1859)
- Bocchoris artificalis (Lederer, 1863)
- Botyodes asialis Guenée, 1854
- Bradina admixtalis (Walker, 1859)
- Bradina mannusalis (Walker, 1859)
- Camptomastix hisbonalis (Walker, 1859)
- Cangetta ammochroa Turner, 1915
- Cangetta aurantiaca Hampson, 1906
- Cangetta haematera (Turner, 1937)
- Cangetta hartoghialis (Snellen, 1872)
- Caprinia felderi Lederer, 1863
- Chabula acamasalis (Walker, 1859)
- Chalcidoptera emissalis (Walker, 1866)
- Chrysothyridia invertalis (Snellen, 1877)
- Cirrhochrista annulifera Hampson, 1919
- Cirrhochrista arcusalis (Walker, 1859)
- Cirrhochrista caconalis Swinhoe, 1900
- Cirrhochrista cyclophora Lower, 1903
- Cirrhochrista punctulata Hampson, 1896
- Cissachroa callischema Turner, 1937
- Cnaphalocrocis araealis (Hampson, 1912)
- Cnaphalocrocis bilinealis (Hampson, 1891)
- Cnaphalocrocis hexagona (Lower, 1903)
- Cnaphalocrocis loxodesma (Turner, 1915)
- Cnaphalocrocis medinalis (Guenée, 1854)
- Cnaphalocrocis poeyalis (Boisduval, 1833)
- Cnaphalocrocis suspicalis (Walker, 1859)
- Conogethes diminutiva Warren, 1896
- Conogethes ersealis (Walker, 1859)
- Conogethes haemactalis Snellen, 1890
- Conogethes pluto (Butler, 1887)
- Conogethes punctiferalis (Guenée, 1854)
- Conogethes semifascialis (Walker, 1866)
- Conogethes tharsalea (Meyrick, 1887)
- Coptobasis lunalis (Guenée, 1854)
- Cotachena aluensis (Butler, 1887)
- Cotachena fuscimarginalis Hampson, 1916
- Cotachena hicana (Turner, 1915)
- Cotachena histricalis (Walker, 1859)
- Criophthona anerasmia (Turner, 1913)
- Criophthona baliocrossa (Turner, 1913)
- Criophthona celidota (Turner, 1913)
- Criophthona ecista (Turner, 1913)
- Criophthona finitima Meyrick, 1884
- Criophthona haliaphra Meyrick, 1884
- Criophthona trileuca Lower, 1903
- Cydalima diaphanalis (Walker, 1866)
- Cydalima laticostalis (Guenée, 1854)
- Desmia discrepans (Butler, 1887)
- Deuterarcha xanthomela Meyrick, 1884
- Diaphania indica (Saunders, 1851)
- Diasemia accalis (Walker, 1859)
- Diasemia completalis Walker, 1866
- Diasemiopsis ramburialis (Duponchel, 1834)
- Diathrausta ochreipennis (Butler, 1886)
- Diathrausta picata (Butler, 1889)
- Dichocrocis clytusalis (Walker, 1859)
- Dichocrocis erixantha (Meyrick, 1886)
- Didymostoma aurotinctalis (Hampson, 1898)
- Diplopseustis perieresalis (Walker, 1859)
- Diplopseustis prophetica Meyrick, 1887
- Dracaenura horochroa Meyrick, 1886
- Dysallacta megalopa (Meyrick, 1889)
- Dysallacta mesozona (Lower, 1901)
- Dysallacta negatalis (Walker, 1859)
- Ectadiosoma straminea (T.P. Lucas, 1892)
- Eudaimonisma batchelorella T.P. Lucas, 1902
- Eurrhyparodes bracteolalis (Zeller, 1852)
- Eurrhyparodes tricoloralis (Zeller, 1852)
- Eurybela scotopis Turner, 1908
- Eurybela trophoessa (Turner, 1908)
- Eusabena monostictalis (Hampson, 1899)
- Eusabena paraphragma (Meyrick, 1889)
- Filodes fulvibasalis Hampson, 1898
- Glauconoe deductalis (Walker, 1859)
- Glycythyma chrysorycta (Meyrick, 1884)
- Glycythyma leonina (Butler, 1886)
- Glycythyma thymedes Turner, 1908
- Glycythyma xanthoscota (Lower, 1903)
- Glyphodes apiospila (Turner, 1922)
- Glyphodes bicolor (Swainson, 1821)
- Glyphodes bivitralis Guenée, 1854
- Glyphodes callipona (Turner, 1908)
- Glyphodes canthusalis Walker, 1859
- Glyphodes conjunctalis Walker, 1866
- Glyphodes cosmarcha Meyrick, 1887
- Glyphodes doleschalii Lederer, 1863
- Glyphodes flavizonalis Hampson, 1898
- Glyphodes margaritaria (Clerck, 1764)
- Glyphodes microta Meyrick, 1889
- Glyphodes multilinealis Kenrick, 1907
- Glyphodes onychinalis (Guenée, 1854)
- Glyphodes pulverulentalis Hampson, 1896
- Glyphodes stolalis Guenée, 1854
- Haritalodes derogata (Fabricius, 1775)
- Herpetogramma cynaralis (Walker, 1859)
- Herpetogramma dilatatipes (Walker, 1866)
- Herpetogramma exculta (T.P. Lucas, 1892)
- Herpetogramma hipponalis (Walker, 1859)
- Herpetogramma holophaea (Hampson, 1898)
- Herpetogramma licarsisalis (Walker, 1859)
- Herpetogramma piasusalis (Walker, 1859)
- Herpetogramma platycapna (Meyrick, 1897)
- Herpetogramma stultalis (Walker, 1859)
- Herpetogramma submarginalis (Swinhoe, 1901)
- Herpetogramma zophosticta (Turner, 1915)
- Hydriris chalybitis Meyrick, 1885
- Hydriris ornatalis (Duponchel, 1832)
- Hymenia perspectalis (Hübner, 1796)
- Hymenoptychis sordida Zeller, 1852
- Ischnurges illustralis Lederer, 1863
- Leucinodes orbonalis Guenée, 1854
- Lipararchis aspilus (Turner, 1915)
- Lipararchis tranquillalis (Lederer, 1863)
- Macaretaera hesperis Meyrick, 1886
- Macrobela phaeophasma Turner, 1939
- Maruca vitrata (Fabricius, 1787)
- Meroctena staintonii Lederer, 1863
- Merodictya marmorata (T.P. Lucas, 1892)
- Metallarcha achoeusalis (Walker, 1859)
- Metallarcha aureodiscalis (Hampson, 1918)
- Metallarcha beatalis (R. Felder & Rogenhofer, 1875)
- Metallarcha calliaspis Meyrick, 1884
- Metallarcha chrysitis Turner, 1941
- Metallarcha crocanthes Lower, 1896
- Metallarcha diplochrysa Meyrick, 1884
- Metallarcha epichrysa Meyrick, 1884
- Metallarcha erromena (Turner, 1908)
- Metallarcha eurychrysa Meyrick, 1884
- Metallarcha leucodetis Lower, 1899
- Metallarcha phaenolis Turner, 1913
- Metallarcha pseliota Meyrick, 1887
- Metallarcha tetraplaca Meyrick, 1887
- Metallarcha thiophara Turner, 1917
- Metallarcha zygosema Lower, 1897
- Metasia acharis Meyrick, 1889
- Metasia achroa (Lower, 1903)
- Metasia aphrarcha (Meyrick, 1887)
- Metasia ateloxantha (Meyrick, 1887)
- Metasia capnochroa (Meyrick, 1884)
- Metasia celaenophaes (Turner, 1913)
- Metasia delotypa (Turner, 1913)
- Metasia dicealis (Walker, 1859)
- Metasia ectodontalis Lower, 1903
- Metasia familiaris (Meyrick, 1884)
- Metasia harmodia (Meyrick, 1887)
- Metasia hemicirca (Meyrick, 1887)
- Metasia homogama (Meyrick, 1887)
- Metasia homophaea (Meyrick, 1885)
- Metasia liophaea (Meyrick, 1887)
- Metasia ochrochoa (Meyrick, 1887)
- Metasia orphnopis Turner, 1915
- Metasia pharisalis (Walker, 1859)
- Metasia phragmatias Lower, 1903
- Metasia polytima Turner, 1908
- Metasia spilocrossa (Turner, 1913)
- Metasia strangalota (Meyrick, 1887)
- Metasia tiasalis (Walker, 1859)
- Metasia triplex (Turner, 1913)
- Metasia typhodes Turner, 1908
- Metasia xenogama (Meyrick, 1884)
- Metasia zinckenialis Hampson, 1899
- Metasia zophophanes (Turner, 1937)
- Metoeca foedalis (Guenée, 1854)
- Myriostephes asphycta (Turner, 1915)
- Myriostephes crocobapta Turner, 1908
- Myriostephes haplodes (Meyrick, 1887)
- Myriostephes leucostictalis (Hampson, 1899)
- Myriostephes matura Meyrick, 1884
- Myriostephes rubriceps (Hampson, 1903)
- Myrmidonistis hoplora Meyrick, 1887
- Nacoleia alincia Turner, 1908
- Nacoleia amphicedalis (Walker, 1859)
- Nacoleia charesalis (Walker, 1859)
- Nacoleia glageropa Turner, 1908
- Nacoleia megaspilalis Hampson, 1912
- Nacoleia mesochlora (Meyrick, 1884)
- Nacoleia obliqualis Hampson, 1898
- Nacoleia octasema (Meyrick, 1886)
- Nacoleia oncophragma Turner, 1908
- Nacoleia parapsephis (Meyrick, 1887)
- Nacoleia rhoeoalis (Walker, 1859)
- Nacoleia syngenica Turner, 1913
- Nausinoe geometralis (Guenée, 1854)
- Nausinoe globulipedalis (Walker, 1866)
- Nausinoe pueritia (Cramer, 1780)
- Niphograpta albiguttalis (Warren, 1889)
- Nomophila corticalis (Walker, 1869)
- Nosophora dispilalis Hampson, 1896
- Nosophora fulvalis Hampson, 1898
- Nosophora hypsalis (Walker, 1866)
- Notarcha aurolinealis (Walker, 1859)
- Notarcha chrysoplasta Meyrick, 1884
- Notarcha obrinusalis (Walker, 1859)
- Notarcha polytimeta (Turner, 1915)
- Omiodes basalticalis (Lederer, 1863)
- Omiodes chrysampyx (Turner, 1908)
- Omiodes diemenalis (Guenée, 1854)
- Omiodes dispilotalis (Walker, 1866)
- Omiodes granulata (Warren, 1896)
- Omiodes indicata (Fabricius, 1775)
- Omiodes nigriscripta Warren, 1896
- Omiodes odontosticta (Hampson, 1898)
- Omiodes origoalis (Walker, 1859)
- Omiodes poeonalis (Walker, 1859)
- Omiodes surrectalis (Walker, 1866)
- Omphisa variegata Kenrick, 1912
- Orphanostigma abruptalis (Walker, 1859)
- Orphanostigma angustale Hampson, 1893
- Orphanostigma perfulvalis (Hampson, 1899)
- Orphnophanes eucerusalis (Walker, 1859)
- Orthospila orissusalis (Walker, 1859)
- Osiriaca ptousalis (Walker, 1859)
- Otiophora clavifera (Hampson, 1899)
- Otiophora leucotypa (Lower, 1903)
- Otiophora leucura (Lower, 1903)
- Pachynoa xanthochyta (Turner, 1933)
- Palpita annulata (Fabricius, 1794)
- Palpita horakae Inoue, 1997
- Palpita hyaloptila (Turner, 1915)
- Palpita limbata (Butler, 1886)
- Palpita margaritacea Inoue, 1997
- Palpita obsolescens Inoue, 1997
- Palpita pajnii Kirti & Rose, 1992
- Palpita pratti (Janse, 1924)
- Palpita rhodocosta Inoue, 1997
- Palpita uedai Inoue, 1997
- Palpita unionalis (Hübner, 1796)
- Pardomima amyntusalis (Walker, 1859)
- Pardomima pompusalis (Walker, 1859)
- Parotis atlitalis (Walker, 1859)
- Parotis incurvata (Warren, 1896)
- Parotis marginata (Hampson, 1893)
- Parotis marinata (Fabricius, 1784)
- Parotis pomonalis (Guenée, 1854)
- Parotis punctiferalis (Walker, 1866)
- Parotis suralis (Lederer, 1863)
- Patania aedilis (Meyrick, 1887)
- Piletocera albimixtalis Hampson, 1917
- Piletocera chlorura (Meyrick, 1887)
- Piletocera macroperalis Hampson, 1897
- Piletocera meekii (T.P. Lucas, 1894)
- Pleuroptya balteata (Fabricius, 1798)
- Pleuroptya emmetris (Turner, 1915)
- Pleuroptya symphonodes (Turner, 1913)
- Pleuroptya tenuis (Warren, 1896)
- Pleuroptya ultimalis (Walker, 1859)
- Prooedema inscisalis (Walker, 1866)
- Prophantis adusta Inoue, 1986
- Prophantis androstigmata (Hampson, 1918)
- Prorodes mimica Swinhoe, 1894
- Protonoceras argocephala (Lower, 1903)
- Protonoceras eucosma (Turner, 1908)
- Protonoceras leucocosma (Turner, 1908)
- Protonoceras mitis (Turner, 1937)
- Pycnarmon aripanalis (Hampson, 1898)
- Pycnarmon cribrata (Fabricius, 1794)
- Pycnarmon jaguaralis (Guenée, 1854)
- Pycnarmon meritalis (Walker, 1859)
- Pygospila bivittalis Walker, 1866
- Pygospila hyalotypa Turner, 1908
- Pygospila tyres (Cramer, 1780)
- Rehimena auritincta (Butler, 1886)
- Rehimena cissophora (Turner, 1908)
- Rehimena leptophaes (Turner, 1913)
- Rehimena surusalis (Walker, 1859)
- Rhectothyris rosea (Warren, 1896)
- Rhimphalea lindusalis (Walker, 1859)
- Rhimphalea sceletalis Lederer, 1863
- Rhimphaliodes macrostigma Hampson, 1893
- Salbia haemorrhoidalis Guenée, 1854
- Samea multiplicalis (Guenée, 1854)
- Sameodes cancellalis (Zeller, 1852)
- Sameodes iolealis (Walker, 1859)
- Sceliodes cordalis (Doubleday, 1843)
- Sedenia achroa Lower, 1902
- Sedenia aspasta Meyrick, 1887
- Sedenia atacta (Turner, 1942)
- Sedenia cervalis Guenée, 1854
- Sedenia erythrura Lower, 1893
- Sedenia leucogramma Turner, 1937
- Sedenia mesochorda Turner, 1917
- Sedenia polydesma Lower, 1900
- Sedenia rupalis Guenée, 1854
- Sedenia xeroscopa Lower, 1900
- Sericophylla nivalis Turner, 1937
- Sisyrophora pfeifferae Lederer, 1863
- Spoladea recurvalis (Fabricius, 1775)
- Stemorrhages amphitritalis (Guenée, 1854)
- Stemorrhages marthesiusalis (Walker, 1859)
- Sufetula alychnopa (Turner, 1908)
- Sufetula hemiophthalma (Meyrick, 1884)
- Syllepte ageneta Turner, 1908
- Syllepte eriopisalis (Walker, 1859)
- Syllepte leucodontia Hampson, 1898
- Syllepte nigriscriptalis (Warren, 1896)
- Syllepte ochrotozona Hampson, 1898
- Syllepte phaeopleura Turner, 1922
- Syllepte phricosticha Turner, 1908
- Syllepte placophaea Turner, 1915
- Syllepte plumifera Hampson, 1898
- Syllepte polydonta Hampson, 1898
- Syllepte ridopalis (Swinhoe, 1892)
- Syllepte subaenescens (Warren, 1896)
- Syllepte tenebrosalis (Warren, 1896)
- Syllepte trachelota Turner, 1913
- Symmoracma minoralis (Snellen, 1880)
- Tabidia inconsequens (Warren, 1896)
- Tabidia insanalis Snellen, 1880
- Tabidia truncatalis Hampson, 1898
- Talanga sabacusalis (Walker, 1859)
- Talanga tolumnialis (Walker, 1859)
- Tatobotys biannulalis (Walker, 1866)
- Tatobotys janapalis (Walker, 1859)
- Terastia subjectalis Lederer, 1863
- Tetridia caletoralis (Walker, 1859)
- Torqueola hypolampra Turner, 1915
- Torqueola monophaes (Lower, 1902)
- Trigonobela nebridopepla Turner, 1915
- Trigonobela perfenestrata (Butler, 1882)
- Tyspanodes creaghi Hampson, 1898
- Tyspanodes hemileucalis (Hampson, 1897)
- Tyspanodes linealis (Moore, 1867)
- Tyspanodes metachrysialis Lower, 1903
- Udea hyalistis (Lower, 1902)
- Voliba asphyctopa Turner, 1908
- Voliba leptomorpha Turner, 1908
- Voliba psammoessa Turner, 1908
- Voliba pycnosticta Turner, 1908
- Voliba scoparialis (Walker, 1866)
- Zagiridia noctualis Hampson, 1897

The following species belongs to the tribe Spilomelini, but has not been assigned to a genus yet. Given here is the original name given to the species when it was first described:

- Dipticophora kuphitincta T.P. Lucas, 1898

== Subfamily Schoenobiinae ==
- Catagela adoceta Common, 1960
- Chionobosca actinopis Turner, 1911
- Helonastes acentrus Common, 1960
- Niphadoses elachia Common, 1960
- Niphadoses hoplites Common, 1960
- Niphadoses palleucus Common, 1960
- Patissa atricostalis Hampson, 1919
- Patissa pentamita (Turner, 1911)
- Patissa stenopteralis Hampson, 1919
- Patissa tinctalis (Hampson, 1919)
- Scirpophaga excerptalis (Walker, 1863)
- Scirpophaga imparellus (Meyrick, 1878)
- Scirpophaga innotata (Walker, 1863)
- Scirpophaga melanostigmus (Turner, 1922)
- Scirpophaga nivella (Fabricius, 1794)
- Scirpophaga ochroleuca Meyrick, 1882
- Scirpophaga percna Common, 1960
- Scirpophaga phaedima Common, 1960
- Scirpophaga praelata (Scopoli, 1763)
- Scirpophaga xantharrenes Common, 1960
- Tipanaea patulella Walker, 1863

== Subfamily Scopariinae ==
=== Heliothelini ===
- Heliothela aterrima Turner, 1937
- Heliothela didymospila Turner, 1915
- Heliothela floricola Turner, 1913
- Heliothela ophideresana (Walker, 1863)
- Heliothela oreias Turner, 1915
- Heliothela paracentra (Meyrick, 1887)

=== Hoploscopini ===
- Perimeceta niphospila (Turner, 1932)
- Perimeceta niphotypa Turner, 1915

=== Scopariini ===
- Eclipsiodes anthomera (Lower, 1896)
- Eclipsiodes crypsixantha Meyrick, 1884
- Eclipsiodes homora Turner, 1908
- Eclipsiodes orthogramma (Lower, 1902)
- Eclipsiodes schizodesma (Lower, 1899)
- Eclipsiodes semigilva Turner, 1922
- Notocrambus cuprealis (Hampson, 1907)
- Notocrambus holomelas Turner, 1922
- Phanomorpha acrocapna (Turner, 1915)
- Phanomorpha dapsilis (Turner, 1908)
- Phanomorpha drosera (Meyrick, 1887)
- Phanomorpha icelomorpha (Turner, 1908)
- Phanomorpha marmaropa (Meyrick, 1889)
- Phanomorpha meliphyrta (Turner, 1908)
- Phanomorpha orthogramma (Lower, 1902)
- Phanomorpha pammicta (Turner, 1908)
- Phanomorpha persumptana (Walker, 1863)
- Phenacodes aleuropa (Lower, 1903)
- Phenacodes vegetata (T.P. Lucas, 1901)
- Scoparia acropola Meyrick, 1884
- Scoparia anaplecta Meyrick, 1884
- Scoparia anisophragma Lower, 1901
- Scoparia anthracias Meyrick, 1884
- Scoparia aphrodes Meyrick, 1884
- Scoparia arcta T.P. Lucas, 1898
- Scoparia argolina (Lower, 1902)
- Scoparia australialis Guenée, 1854
- Scoparia australiensis (Hampson, 1898)
- Scoparia axiolecta Turner, 1922
- Scoparia charopoea Turner, 1908
- Scoparia chiasta Meyrick, 1884
- Scoparia citrochroa (Turner, 1908)
- Scoparia cleodoralis (Walker, 1859)
- Scoparia contempta (Turner, 1927)
- Scoparia crocospila Turner, 1922
- Scoparia crypserythra (Lower, 1901)
- Scoparia deliniens T.P. Lucas, 1898
- Scoparia emmetropis Turner, 1915
- Scoparia epicryma Meyrick, 1884
- Scoparia epigypsa (Lower, 1902)
- Scoparia eremitis Meyrick, 1884
- Scoparia erythroneura (Turner, 1937)
- Scoparia eumeles Meyrick, 1884
- Scoparia eutacta Turner, 1931
- Scoparia exhibitalis Walker, 1865
- Scoparia favilliferella (Walker, 1866)
- Scoparia gethosyna Turner, 1922
- Scoparia gomphota Meyrick, 1884
- Scoparia homala Meyrick, 1884
- Scoparia hypoxantha Lower, 1896
- Scoparia ischnoptera Turner, 1922
- Scoparia ithyntis Turner, 1922
- Scoparia leucomela Lower, 1893
- Scoparia leuconota (Lower, 1902)
- Scoparia lichenopa Lower, 1897
- Scoparia melanoxantha Turner, 1922
- Scoparia mesogramma Lower, 1900
- Scoparia meyrickii (Butler, 1882)
- Scoparia nephelitis (Meyrick, 1887)
- Scoparia niphetodes Turner, 1931
- Scoparia objurgalis Guenée, 1854
- Scoparia ochrophara Turner, 1915
- Scoparia oxycampyla (Turner, 1937)
- Scoparia oxygona Meyrick, 1897
- Scoparia paracycla (Lower, 1902)
- Scoparia pediopola (Turner, 1937)
- Scoparia perierga Meyrick, 1884
- Scoparia philonephes (Meyrick, 1884)
- Scoparia plagiotis Meyrick, 1887
- Scoparia platymera Lower, 1905
- Scoparia protorthra Meyrick, 1885
- Scoparia spelaea Meyrick, 1884
- Scoparia stenopa Lower, 1902
- Scoparia striatalis (Hampson, 1907)
- Scoparia susanae Lower, 1900
- Scoparia synapta Meyrick, 1884
- Scoparia syntaracta Meyrick, 1884
- Scoparia threnodes Meyrick, 1887
- Scoparia tristicta Turner, 1922

== Subfamily Wurthiinae ==
- Niphopyralis chionesis Hampson, 1919
