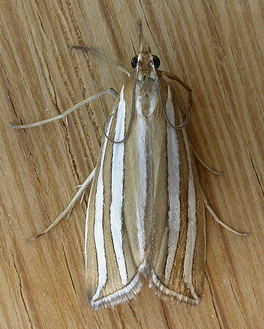
- Hednota bivittella

Scientific classification
- Kingdom: Animalia
- Phylum: Arthropoda
- Clade: Pancrustacea
- Class: Insecta
- Order: Lepidoptera
- Family: Crambidae
- Subfamily: Crambinae
- Tribe: Chiloini
- Genus: Hednota; Meyrick, 1886

= Hednota =

Genus of moths

Hednota is a genus of moths of the family Crambidae.

== Species ==
- Hednota acontophora (Meyrick, 1882)
- Hednota ancylosticha Koch, 1966
- Hednota argyroeles (Meyrick, 1882)
- Hednota asterias Meyrick, 1887
- Hednota aurantiacus (Meyrick, 1879)
- Hednota bathrotricha (Lower, 1902)
- Hednota bifractellus (Walker, 1863)
- Hednota bivittella (Donovan, 1805)
- Hednota cotylophora (Turner, 1942)
- Hednota crypsichroa Lower, 1893
- Hednota cyclosema (Lower, 1896)
- Hednota demissalis (Walker, 1863)
- Hednota diacentra (Meyrick, 1897)
- Hednota diargyra (Turner, 1925)
- Hednota dichospila (Turner, 1937)
- Hednota empheres Koch, 1966
- Hednota enchias (Meyrick, 1897)
- Hednota eremenopa (Lower, 1903)
- Hednota grammellus (Zeller, 1863)
- Hednota hagnodes (Turner, 1942)
- Hednota haplotypa (Turner, 1904)
- Hednota hoplitellus (Meyrick, 1879)
- Hednota icelomorpha (Turner, 1906)
- Hednota impletellus (Walker, 1863)
- Hednota invalidellus (Meyrick, 1879)
- Hednota koojanensis Koch, 1966
- Hednota longipalpella (Meyrick, 1879)
- Hednota macroura (Lower, 1902)
- Hednota megalarcha (Meyrick, 1885)
- Hednota mesochra (Lower, 1896)
- Hednota ocypetes Meyrick, 1936
- Hednota odontoides Koch, 1966
- Hednota opulentellus (Zeller, 1863)
- Hednota orthotypa (Turner, 1904)
- Hednota panselenella (Meyrick, 1882)
- Hednota panteucha (Meyrick, 1885)
- Hednota pedionoma (Meyrick, 1885)
- Hednota peripeuces (Turner, 1942)
- Hednota perlatalis (Walker, 1863)
- Hednota pleniferellus (Walker, 1863)
- Hednota polyargyra (Turner, 1913)
- Hednota recurvellus (Walker, 1863)
- Hednota relatalis (Walker, 1863)
- Hednota stenipteralis (Lower, 1903)
- Hednota tenuilineata Koch, 1966
- Hednota thologramma Meyrick, 1936
- Hednota toxotis Meyrick, 1887
- Hednota trissomochla (Turner, 1911)
- Hednota urithrepta (Turner, 1925)
- Hednota vetustellus (Walker, 1863)
- Hednota xiphosema (Turner, 1904)
- Hednota xylophaea Meyrick, 1887
