= Scoparia eutacta =

Scientific classification
- Kingdom: Animalia
- Phylum: Arthropoda
- Class: Insecta
- Order: Lepidoptera
- Family: Crambidae
- Genus: Scoparia
- Species: S. eutacta

Binomial name
- Scoparia eutacta Turner, 1931

Species of moth

Scoparia eutacta is a moth in the family Crambidae. It was described by Alfred Jefferis Turner in 1931. It is found in Australia, where it has been recorded from Queensland.

The wingspan is about 17 mm. The forewings are white with blackish irroration (sprinkling). There is a white antemedian transverse line, edged with blackish. There are two brown-blackish spots, as well as some blackish dots on the costa. The postmedian line is white and there is a series of blackish spots on the termen and tornus. The hindwings are whitish. Adults have been recorded on wing in March.
