= Phanomorpha marmaropa =

Scientific classification
- Kingdom: Animalia
- Phylum: Arthropoda
- Class: Insecta
- Order: Lepidoptera
- Family: Crambidae
- Genus: Phanomorpha
- Species: P. marmaropa

Binomial name
- Phanomorpha marmaropa (Meyrick, 1889)

Synonyms
- Eclipsiodes marmaropa Meyrick, 1889; Tauroscopa callixutha Turner, 1925

Species of moth

Phanomorpha marmaropa is a moth in the family Crambidae. It was described by Edward Meyrick in 1889. It is found in Australia, where it has been recorded from New South Wales.
