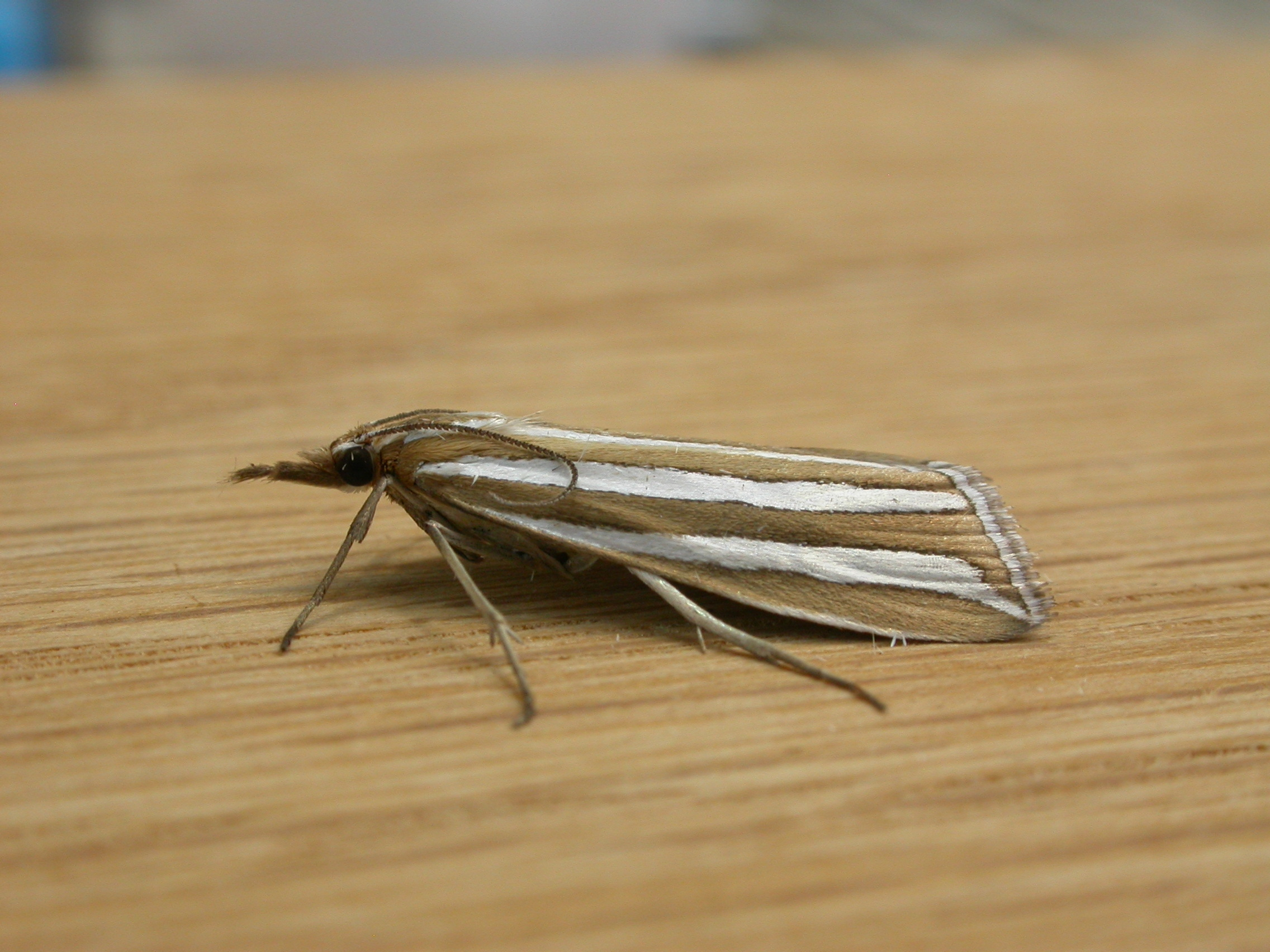

Scientific classification
- Kingdom: Animalia
- Phylum: Arthropoda
- Clade: Pancrustacea
- Class: Insecta
- Order: Lepidoptera
- Family: Crambidae
- Subfamily: Crambinae
- Tribe: Chiloini
- Genus: Hednota
- Species: H. bivittella

Binomial name
- Hednota bivittella (Donovan, 1805)

Synonyms
- Tinea bivittella Donovan, 1805; Tinea vittella Svederus, 1787 (preocc. Linnaeus, 1758); Crambus trivittatus Zeller, 1863

= Hednota bivittella =

Species of moth

Hednota bivittella is a species of moth of the family Crambidae described by Edward Donovan in 1805. It is found in Australia, including Tasmania.
