= Hednota hagnodes =

Scientific classification
- Kingdom: Animalia
- Phylum: Arthropoda
- Clade: Pancrustacea
- Class: Insecta
- Order: Lepidoptera
- Family: Crambidae
- Subfamily: Crambinae
- Tribe: Chiloini
- Genus: Hednota
- Species: H. hagnodes

Binomial name
- Hednota hagnodes (Turner, 1942)

Synonyms
- Talis hagnodes Turner, 1942

Species of moth

Hednota hagnodes is a moth in the family Crambidae. It was described by Alfred Jefferis Turner in 1942. It is found in Australia, where it has been recorded from Western Australia.
