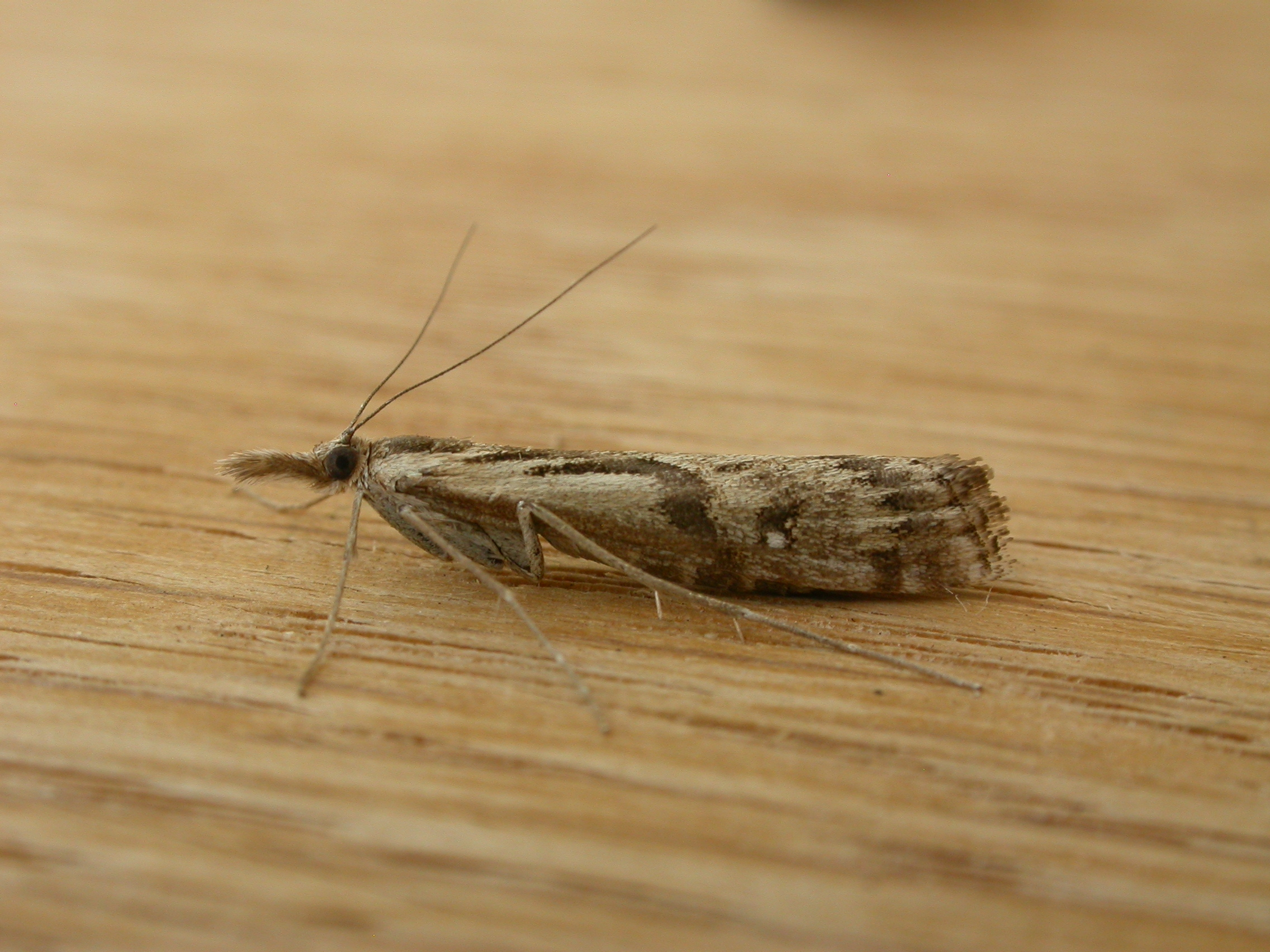

Scientific classification
- Kingdom: Animalia
- Phylum: Arthropoda
- Clade: Pancrustacea
- Class: Insecta
- Order: Lepidoptera
- Family: Crambidae
- Subfamily: Crambinae
- Tribe: Chiloini
- Genus: Hednota
- Species: H. pedionoma

Binomial name
- Hednota pedionoma (Meyrick, 1885)

Synonyms
- Thinasotia pedionoma Meyrick, 1885; Metasia bilunalis Hampson, 1913

= Hednota pedionoma =

Species of moth

Hednota pedionoma is a moth of the family Crambidae described by Edward Meyrick in 1885. It is found in Western Australia, South Australia, Tasmania and Victoria.

The wingspan is about 20 mm.

The larvae feed on various cereals in the family Poaceae.
