= Scoparia acropola =

Scientific classification
- Kingdom: Animalia
- Phylum: Arthropoda
- Class: Insecta
- Order: Lepidoptera
- Family: Crambidae
- Genus: Scoparia
- Species: S. acropola

Binomial name
- Scoparia acropola Meyrick, 1885

Species of moth

Scoparia acropola is a moth in the family Crambidae. It was described by Edward Meyrick in 1885. It is found in Australia, where it has been recorded from Tasmania.

The wingspan is 25–28 mm. The forewings are light ochreous fuscous, finely irrorated (sprinkled) with dark reddish fuscous and with a few whitish scales. The first line is indicated only by a suffused dark posterior margin. The second line is pale. The hindwings are ochreous-grey whitish with a faintly indicated postmedian line. Adults have been recorded on wing in December.
