= Hednota cyclosema =

Scientific classification
- Kingdom: Animalia
- Phylum: Arthropoda
- Clade: Pancrustacea
- Class: Insecta
- Order: Lepidoptera
- Family: Crambidae
- Subfamily: Crambinae
- Tribe: Chiloini
- Genus: Hednota
- Species: H. cyclosema

Binomial name
- Hednota cyclosema (Lower, 1896)

Synonyms
- Talis cyclosema Lower, 1896

Species of moth

Hednota cyclosema is a moth in the family Crambidae. It was described by Oswald Bertram Lower in 1896. It is found in Australia.
