= Hednota grammellus =

Scientific classification
- Kingdom: Animalia
- Phylum: Arthropoda
- Clade: Pancrustacea
- Class: Insecta
- Order: Lepidoptera
- Family: Crambidae
- Subfamily: Crambinae
- Tribe: Chiloini
- Genus: Hednota
- Species: H. grammellus

Binomial name
- Hednota grammellus (Zeller, 1863)

Synonyms
- Crambus grammellus Zeller, 1863; Crambus enneagrammos Meyrick, 1879; Talis gramella Turner, 1904

Species of moth

Hednota grammellus is a moth in the family Crambidae. It was described by Philipp Christoph Zeller in 1863. It is found in Australia, where it has been recorded from New South Wales and Victoria.

The forewings are white with a pattern of brown lines.
