= Hednota orthotypa =

Scientific classification
- Kingdom: Animalia
- Phylum: Arthropoda
- Clade: Pancrustacea
- Class: Insecta
- Order: Lepidoptera
- Family: Crambidae
- Subfamily: Crambinae
- Tribe: Chiloini
- Genus: Hednota
- Species: H. orthotypa

Binomial name
- Hednota orthotypa (Turner, 1904)

Synonyms
- Talis orthotypa Turner, 1904

Species of moth

Hednota orthotypa is a moth in the family Crambidae. It was described by Alfred Jefferis Turner in 1904. It is found in Australia, where it has been recorded from New South Wales.
