= Hednota ocypetes =

Scientific classification
- Kingdom: Animalia
- Phylum: Arthropoda
- Clade: Pancrustacea
- Class: Insecta
- Order: Lepidoptera
- Family: Crambidae
- Subfamily: Crambinae
- Tribe: Chiloini
- Genus: Hednota
- Species: H. ocypetes

Binomial name
- Hednota ocypetes Meyrick, 1936

Species of moth

Hednota ocypetes is a moth in the family Crambidae. It was described by Edward Meyrick in 1936. It is found in Australia, where it has been recorded from New South Wales.
