= Syllepte polydonta =

Scientific classification
- Kingdom: Animalia
- Phylum: Arthropoda
- Class: Insecta
- Order: Lepidoptera
- Family: Crambidae
- Genus: Syllepte
- Species: S. polydonta

Binomial name
- Syllepte polydonta (Hampson, 1898)

Synonyms
- Sylepta polydonta Hampson, 1898

Species of moth

Syllepte polydonta is a moth in the family Crambidae. It is found in Indonesia (Ambon Island), Papua New Guinea, where it has been recorded from the D'Entrecasteaux Islands (Fergusson Island) and Australia, where it has been recorded from Queensland.

The wingspan is about 32 mm. Adults are straw-yellow, the forewings with fuscous marks at the base. The antemedial line is strongly bent outwards on the median nervure, then angled inwards in the submedian interspace and outwards on vein 1. There is a prominent black discoidal lunule. The postmedial line is strongly dentate, slightly bent outwards between veins 5 and 3, then retracted to below the angle of the cell and bent outwards again. The hindwings have a prominent black discoidal lunule and a strongly dentate postmedial line, slightly bent outwards between veins 5 and 3, then retracted to below the angle of the cell.
