= Hednota diargyra =

Scientific classification
- Kingdom: Animalia
- Phylum: Arthropoda
- Clade: Pancrustacea
- Class: Insecta
- Order: Lepidoptera
- Family: Crambidae
- Subfamily: Crambinae
- Tribe: Chiloini
- Genus: Hednota
- Species: H. diargyra

Binomial name
- Hednota diargyra (Turner, 1925)

Synonyms
- Talis diargyra Turner, 1925

Species of moth

Hednota diargyra is a moth in the family Crambidae. It was described by Alfred Jefferis Turner in 1925. It is found in Australia, where it has been recorded from Western Australia.
