= Scoparia anaplecta =

Scientific classification
- Kingdom: Animalia
- Phylum: Arthropoda
- Class: Insecta
- Order: Lepidoptera
- Family: Crambidae
- Genus: Scoparia
- Species: S. anaplecta

Binomial name
- Scoparia anaplecta Meyrick, 1885

Species of moth

Scoparia anaplecta is a moth in the family Crambidae. It was described by Edward Meyrick in 1885. It is found in Australia, where it has been recorded from Tasmania.

The wingspan is 14.5–15.5 mm. The forewings are purplish grey, irrorated (sprinkled) with black. There is a pale whitish-ochreous spot on the inner margin. Both the first and second lines are ochreous whitish. The hindwings are ochreous whitish, with a few grey scales. Adults have been recorded on wing in December.
