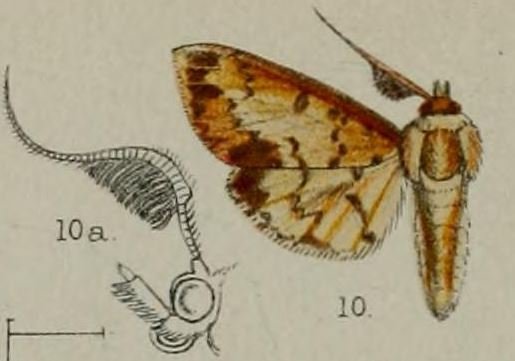
- Sylepta plumifera

Scientific classification
- Kingdom: Animalia
- Phylum: Arthropoda
- Class: Insecta
- Order: Lepidoptera
- Family: Crambidae
- Genus: Syllepte
- Species: S. plumifera

Binomial name
- Syllepte plumifera (Hampson, 1898)

Synonyms
- Sylepta plumifera Hampson, 1898

= Syllepte plumifera =

Species of moth

Syllepte plumifera is a moth in the family Crambidae. It was described by George Hampson in 1898. It is found in Indonesia (Ambon Island) and Papua New Guinea, where it has been recorded from the D'Entrecasteaux Islands (Fergusson Island).

The wingspan is about 40 mm. Adults are golden yellow, the forewings with a rufous costal area. There is a subbasal point on the inner margin and an antemedial dark rufous line, angled below the cell, then incurved. There is a spot in the cell and a discoidal reniform spot, as well as a dentate postmedial line, bent outwards between veins 5 and 2, then retracted to below the end of the cell. The terminal area is rufous from the apex to vein 5 and at the tornus. The hindwings have a discoidal reniform spot and the postmedial line is bent outwards and dentate between veins 5 and 2, then retracted to below the angle of the cell and ending near the tornus. The apical area and some terminal lunules are rufous. Both wings have a series of dark point on the cilia.
