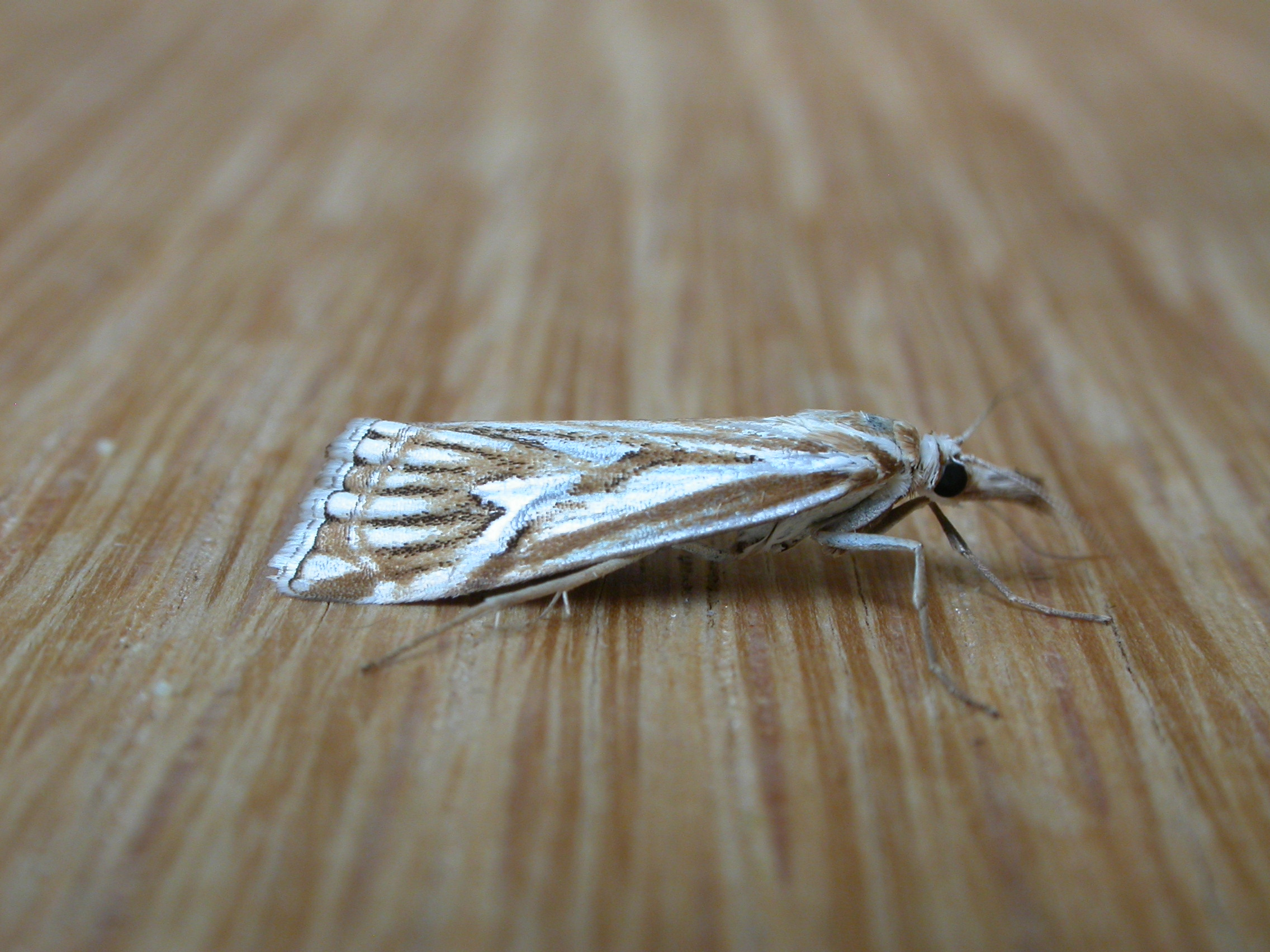

Scientific classification
- Kingdom: Animalia
- Phylum: Arthropoda
- Clade: Pancrustacea
- Class: Insecta
- Order: Lepidoptera
- Family: Crambidae
- Subfamily: Crambinae
- Tribe: Chiloini
- Genus: Hednota
- Species: H. pleniferellus

Binomial name
- Hednota pleniferellus (Walker, 1863)

Synonyms
- Crambus pleniferellus Walker, 1863; Crambus aurosus R. Felder & Rogenhofer, 1875

= Hednota pleniferellus =

Species of moth

Hednota pleniferellus is a species of moth of the family Crambidae. It is found in Australia, in Queensland, New South Wales, Victoria, and Tasmania.
