= Hednota cotylophora =

Scientific classification
- Kingdom: Animalia
- Phylum: Arthropoda
- Clade: Pancrustacea
- Class: Insecta
- Order: Lepidoptera
- Family: Crambidae
- Subfamily: Crambinae
- Tribe: Chiloini
- Genus: Hednota
- Species: H. cotylophora

Binomial name
- Hednota cotylophora (Turner, 1942)

Synonyms
- Talis cotylophora Turner, 1942

Species of moth

Hednota cotylophora is a moth in the family Crambidae. It was described by Turner in 1942. It has been recorded from Western Australia.
