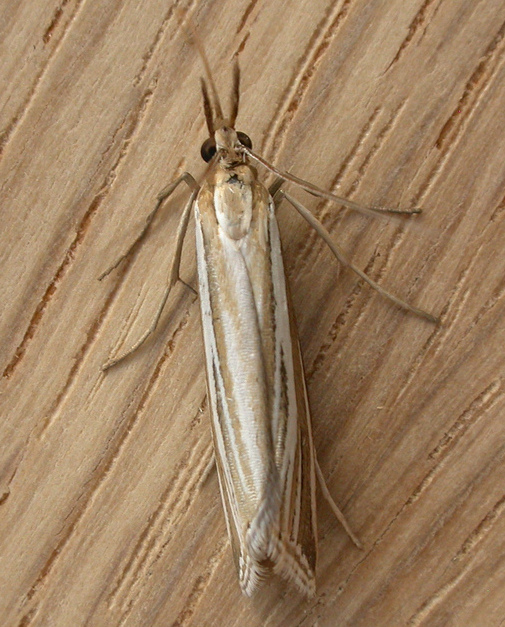

Scientific classification
- Kingdom: Animalia
- Phylum: Arthropoda
- Clade: Pancrustacea
- Class: Insecta
- Order: Lepidoptera
- Family: Crambidae
- Subfamily: Crambinae
- Tribe: Chiloini
- Genus: Hednota
- Species: H. relatalis

Binomial name
- Hednota relatalis (Walker, 1863)

Synonyms
- Crambus relatalis Walker, 1863; Crambus argyroneurus Zeller, 1863; Prosmixus radialis Hampson, 1919

= Hednota relatalis =

Species of moth

Hednota relatalis is a moth of the family Crambidae described by Francis Walker in 1863. It is found in Australia, in Australian Capital Territory, Victoria, Tasmania, South Australia, and Western Australia.
