= Hednota crypsichroa =

Scientific classification
- Kingdom: Animalia
- Phylum: Arthropoda
- Clade: Pancrustacea
- Class: Insecta
- Order: Lepidoptera
- Family: Crambidae
- Subfamily: Crambinae
- Tribe: Chiloini
- Genus: Hednota
- Species: H. crypsichroa

Binomial name
- Hednota crypsichroa Lower, 1893

Synonyms
- Prosmixis discilunalis Hampson, 1919

Species of moth

Hednota crypsichroa is a moth in the family of Crambidae. It was described by Oswald Bertram Lower in 1893. It is found in Australia, where it has been recorded from Victoria.
