= Scoparia syntaracta =

Scientific classification
- Kingdom: Animalia
- Phylum: Arthropoda
- Class: Insecta
- Order: Lepidoptera
- Family: Crambidae
- Genus: Scoparia
- Species: S. syntaracta

Binomial name
- Scoparia syntaracta Meyrick, 1885

Species of moth

Scoparia syntaracta is a moth in the family Crambidae. It was described by Edward Meyrick in 1885. It is found in Australia, where it has been recorded from New South Wales, Victoria, South Australia and Tasmania.

The wingspan is 20–21 mm. The forewings are white, irrorated (sprinkled) with black and sometimes partially suffused with light fuscous. There are several small black spots towards the base. The hindwings are whitish grey, becoming fuscous grey posteriorly. Adults have been recorded on wing in September and from December to February.
