= Hednota stenipteralis =

Scientific classification
- Kingdom: Animalia
- Phylum: Arthropoda
- Clade: Pancrustacea
- Class: Insecta
- Order: Lepidoptera
- Family: Crambidae
- Subfamily: Crambinae
- Tribe: Chiloini
- Genus: Hednota
- Species: H. stenipteralis

Binomial name
- Hednota stenipteralis (Lower, 1903)

Synonyms
- Talis stenipteralis Lower, 1903

Species of moth

Hednota stenipteralis is a moth in the family Crambidae. It was described by Oswald Bertram Lower in 1903. It is found in Australia.
