= Scoparia emmetropis =

Scientific classification
- Kingdom: Animalia
- Phylum: Arthropoda
- Clade: Pancrustacea
- Class: Insecta
- Order: Lepidoptera
- Family: Crambidae
- Genus: Scoparia
- Species: S. emmetropis

Binomial name
- Scoparia emmetropis Turner, 1915

Species of moth

Scoparia emmetropis is a moth in the family Crambidae. It was described by Turner in 1915. It is found in Australia, where it has been recorded from New South Wales.

The wingspan is 20–22 mm. The forewings are whitish, irrorated with pale grey and with a few scattered dark fuscous scales. The markings are blackish. The hindwings are grey-whitish, with a weakly indicated grey subterminal. Adults have been recorded on wing in January.
