= Eudonia synapta =

Scientific classification
- Kingdom: Animalia
- Phylum: Arthropoda
- Class: Insecta
- Order: Lepidoptera
- Family: Crambidae
- Genus: Eudonia
- Species: E. synapta

Binomial name
- Eudonia synapta (Meyrick, 1885)

Synonyms
- Scoparia synapta Meyrick, 1885

Species of moth

Eudonia synapta is a moth in the family Crambidae. It was described by Edward Meyrick in 1885. It is found in New Zealand and Australia.

The wingspan is about 16 mm. The forewings are white, sprinkled with ochreous brown and black. The basal area is ochreous brown, suffused with black and cut by a narrow white transverse line midway between the base and the first line. This first line is margined by black posteriorly, except in the middle. The second line is black margined anteriorly. The hindwings are grey, but the apex and hindmargin are darker. Adults have been recorded on wing in December.
