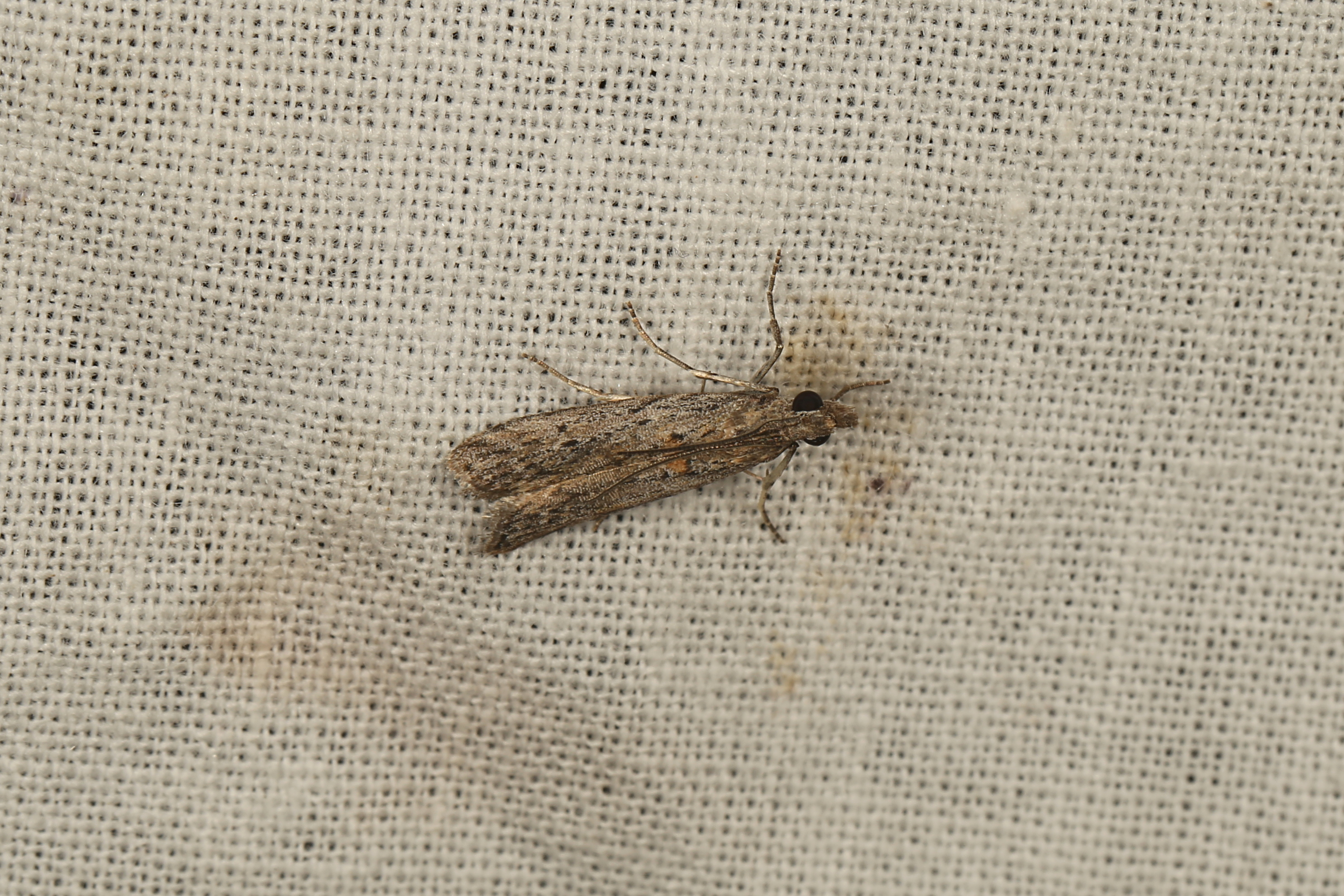

Scientific classification
- Kingdom: Animalia
- Phylum: Arthropoda
- Class: Insecta
- Order: Lepidoptera
- Family: Crambidae
- Genus: Scoparia
- Species: S. pediopola

Binomial name
- Scoparia pediopola (Turner, 1937)

Synonyms
- Platytes pediopola Turner, 1937

= Scoparia pediopola =

Species of moth

Scoparia pediopola is a moth in the family Crambidae. It was described by Turner in 1937. It is found in Australia, where it has been recorded from Queensland.
