= Hednota invalidellus =

Scientific classification
- Kingdom: Animalia
- Phylum: Arthropoda
- Clade: Pancrustacea
- Class: Insecta
- Order: Lepidoptera
- Family: Crambidae
- Subfamily: Crambinae
- Tribe: Chiloini
- Genus: Hednota
- Species: H. invalidellus

Binomial name
- Hednota invalidellus (Meyrick, 1879)

Synonyms
- Crambus invalidellus Meyrick, 1879; Talis eucraspeda Turner, 1904

Species of moth

Hednota invalidellus is a moth in the family Crambidae. It was described by Edward Meyrick in 1879. It is found in Australia, where it has been recorded from Tasmania and Queensland.
