= Hednota opulentellus =

Scientific classification
- Kingdom: Animalia
- Phylum: Arthropoda
- Clade: Pancrustacea
- Class: Insecta
- Order: Lepidoptera
- Family: Crambidae
- Subfamily: Crambinae
- Tribe: Chiloini
- Genus: Hednota
- Species: H. opulentellus

Binomial name
- Hednota opulentellus (Zeller, 1863)

Synonyms
- Crambus opulentellus Zeller, 1863; Talis opulentus

Species of moth

Hednota opulentellus is a moth in the family Crambidae. It was described by Philipp Christoph Zeller in 1863. It is found in Australia, where it has been recorded from Tasmania, New South Wales and Victoria.
