= Hednota acontophora =

Scientific classification
- Kingdom: Animalia
- Phylum: Arthropoda
- Clade: Pancrustacea
- Class: Insecta
- Order: Lepidoptera
- Family: Crambidae
- Subfamily: Crambinae
- Tribe: Chiloini
- Genus: Hednota
- Species: H. acontophora

Binomial name
- Hednota acontophora (Meyrick, 1882)

Synonyms
- Thinasotia acontophora Meyrick, 1882

Species of moth

Hednota acontophora is a moth in the family Crambidae. It was described by Edward Meyrick in 1882. It is found in Australia, where it has been recorded from Victoria and South Australia.

The wingspan is about 20 mm. The forewings are cream with a dark brown streak.
