= Hednota xylophaea =

Scientific classification
- Kingdom: Animalia
- Phylum: Arthropoda
- Clade: Pancrustacea
- Class: Insecta
- Order: Lepidoptera
- Family: Crambidae
- Subfamily: Crambinae
- Tribe: Chiloini
- Genus: Hednota
- Species: H. xylophaea

Binomial name
- Hednota xylophaea Meyrick, 1887

Synonyms
- Talis xylophea Turner, 1904

Species of moth

Hednota xylophaea is a moth in the family Crambidae. It was described by Edward Meyrick in 1887. It is found in Australia, where it has been recorded from South Australia.
