= Hednota bathrotricha =

Scientific classification
- Kingdom: Animalia
- Phylum: Arthropoda
- Clade: Pancrustacea
- Class: Insecta
- Order: Lepidoptera
- Family: Crambidae
- Subfamily: Crambinae
- Tribe: Chiloini
- Genus: Hednota
- Species: H. bathrotricha

Binomial name
- Hednota bathrotricha (Lower, 1902)

Synonyms
- Surattha bathrotricha Lower, 1902

Species of moth

Hednota bathrotricha is a moth in the family Crambidae. It was described by Oswald Bertram Lower in 1902. It is found in Australia, where it has been recorded from New South Wales.
