= Scoparia oxycampyla =

Scientific classification
- Kingdom: Animalia
- Phylum: Arthropoda
- Class: Insecta
- Order: Lepidoptera
- Family: Crambidae
- Genus: Scoparia
- Species: S. oxycampyla

Binomial name
- Scoparia oxycampyla (Turner, 1937)

Synonyms
- Platytes oxycampyla Turner, 1937

Species of moth

Scoparia oxycampyla is a moth in the family Crambidae. It was described by Turner in 1937. It is found in Australia, where it has been recorded from Victoria.
