= Hednota aurantiacus =

Scientific classification
- Kingdom: Animalia
- Phylum: Arthropoda
- Clade: Pancrustacea
- Class: Insecta
- Order: Lepidoptera
- Family: Crambidae
- Subfamily: Crambinae
- Tribe: Chiloini
- Genus: Hednota
- Species: H. aurantiacus

Binomial name
- Hednota aurantiacus (Meyrick, 1879)

Synonyms
- Crambus aurantiacus Meyrick, 1879

Species of moth

Hednota aurantiacus is a moth in the family Crambidae. It was described by Edward Meyrick in 1879. It is found in Australia.
