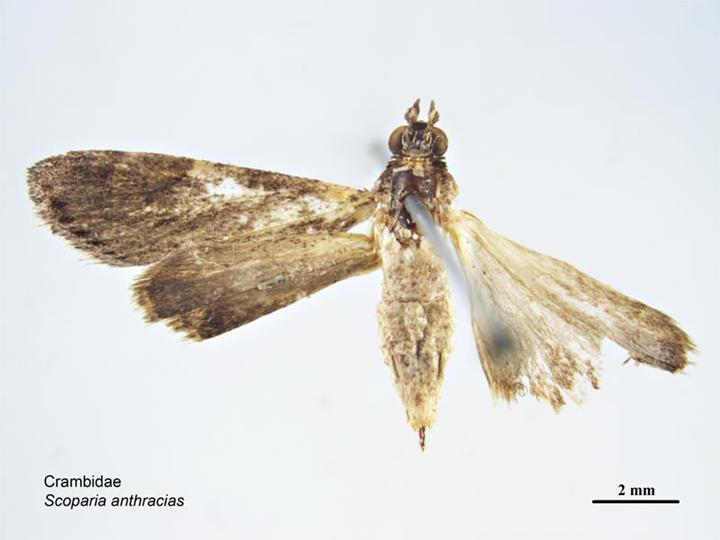
- Dorsal view
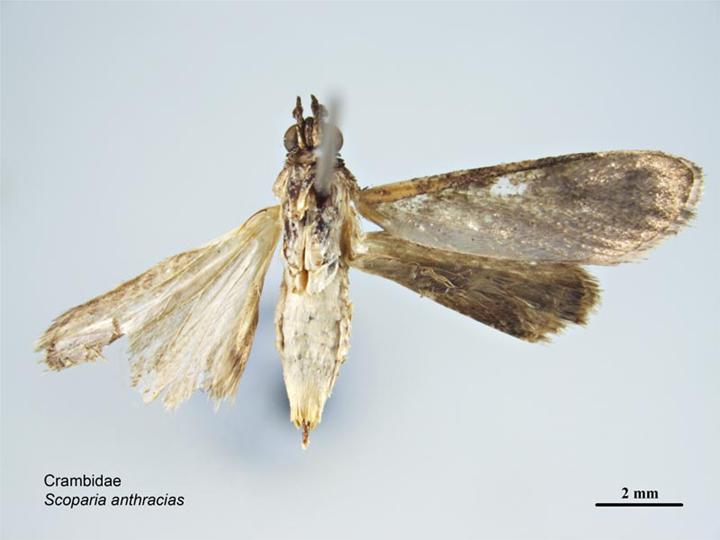
- Ventral view

Scientific classification
- Kingdom: Animalia
- Phylum: Arthropoda
- Class: Insecta
- Order: Lepidoptera
- Family: Crambidae
- Genus: Eudonia
- Species: E. anthracias

Binomial name
- Eudonia anthracias (Meyrick, 1884)

Synonyms
- Scoparia anthracias Meyrick, 1884

= Eudonia anthracias =

Species of moth

Eudonia anthracias is a moth of the family Crambidae. It was described by Edward Meyrick in 1884 and it is found in Australia. This species was named by Edward Meyrick in 1884 and was originally named Scoparia anthracias. Meyrick went on to give a full description of the species in 1885.
