= Scoparia epigypsa =

Scientific classification
- Kingdom: Animalia
- Phylum: Arthropoda
- Class: Insecta
- Order: Lepidoptera
- Family: Crambidae
- Genus: Scoparia
- Species: S. epigypsa

Binomial name
- Scoparia epigypsa (Lower, 1902)

Synonyms
- Eclipsiodes epigypsa Lower, 1902

Species of moth

Scoparia epigypsa is a moth in the family Crambidae. It was described by Oswald Bertram Lower in 1902. It is found in Australia, where it has been recorded from New South Wales.

The wingspan is about 16 mm. The forewings are cinereous (ash-grey) fuscous, strongly suffused with white. The lines are fuscous and there is a fuscous discal spot, as well as two oblique fuscous marks on the costa near the apex. There is a row of connected fuscous dots along the termen. The hindwings are light fuscous, becoming grey whitish on the basal half. Adults have been recorded on wing in September.
