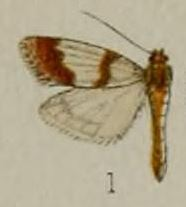

Scientific classification
- Kingdom: Animalia
- Phylum: Arthropoda
- Class: Insecta
- Order: Lepidoptera
- Family: Crambidae
- Genus: Scoparia
- Species: S. australiensis

Binomial name
- Scoparia australiensis (Hampson, 1899)

Synonyms
- Gonodiscus australiensis Hampson, 1899

= Scoparia australiensis =

Species of moth

Scoparia australiensis is a moth in the family Crambidae. It was described by George Hampson in 1899. It is found in Australia, where it has been recorded from Western Australia and Queensland.

The wingspan is about 20 mm. The forewings are straw yellow with a brown fascia on the costa from the base to the brown antemedial line. The postmedial line and the terminal area is suffused with brown. There is a terminal series of brown dots on yellow marks. The hindwings are slightly suffused with fuscous.
