= Hednota icelomorpha =

Scientific classification
- Kingdom: Animalia
- Phylum: Arthropoda
- Clade: Pancrustacea
- Class: Insecta
- Order: Lepidoptera
- Family: Crambidae
- Subfamily: Crambinae
- Tribe: Chiloini
- Genus: Hednota
- Species: H. icelomorpha

Binomial name
- Hednota icelomorpha (Turner, 1906)

Synonyms
- Talis icelomorpha Turner, 1906

Species of moth

Hednota icelomorpha is a moth in the family Crambidae. It was described by Alfred Jefferis Turner in 1906. It is found in Australia.
