= Hednota dichospila =

Scientific classification
- Kingdom: Animalia
- Phylum: Arthropoda
- Clade: Pancrustacea
- Class: Insecta
- Order: Lepidoptera
- Family: Crambidae
- Subfamily: Crambinae
- Tribe: Chiloini
- Genus: Hednota
- Species: H. dichospila

Binomial name
- Hednota dichospila (Turner, 1937)

Synonyms
- Talis dichospila Turner, 1937

Species of moth

Hednota dichospila is a moth in the family Crambidae. It was described by Alfred Jefferis Turner in 1937. It is found in Australia, where it has been recorded from Western Australia.
