= Scoparia chiasta =

Scientific classification
- Kingdom: Animalia
- Phylum: Arthropoda
- Class: Insecta
- Order: Lepidoptera
- Family: Crambidae
- Genus: Scoparia
- Species: S. chiasta

Binomial name
- Scoparia chiasta Meyrick, 1884

Species of moth

Scoparia chiasta is a moth in the family Crambidae. It is found in Australia, where it has been recorded from New South Wales. This species was named by Edward Meyrick in 1884. Meyrick went on to give a full description of the species in 1885.

The wingspan is 14–17 mm. The forewings are white, irrorated (sprinkled) with fuscous and dark fuscous and with a short dark fuscous streak from the base of the costa parallel to the inner margin. The first line is white, posteriorly margined with dark fuscous. The second line is white, margined with dark fuscous. The hindwings are pale whitish grey, greyer on the hindmargin and towards the apex. Adults have been recorded on wing from May to August.
