= Hednota macroura =

Scientific classification
- Kingdom: Animalia
- Phylum: Arthropoda
- Clade: Pancrustacea
- Class: Insecta
- Order: Lepidoptera
- Family: Crambidae
- Subfamily: Crambinae
- Tribe: Chiloini
- Genus: Hednota
- Species: H. macroura

Binomial name
- Hednota macroura (Lower, 1902)

Synonyms
- Talis macroura Lower, 1902

Species of moth

Hednota macroura is a moth in the family Crambidae. It was described by Oswald Bertram Lower in 1902. It is found in Australia, where it has been recorded from South Australia.
