= Hednota panteucha =

Scientific classification
- Kingdom: Animalia
- Phylum: Arthropoda
- Clade: Pancrustacea
- Class: Insecta
- Order: Lepidoptera
- Family: Crambidae
- Subfamily: Crambinae
- Tribe: Chiloini
- Genus: Hednota
- Species: H. panteucha

Binomial name
- Hednota panteucha (Meyrick, 1885)

Synonyms
- Thinasotia panteucha Meyrick, 1885

Species of moth

Hednota panteucha is a moth in the family Crambidae. It was described by Edward Meyrick in 1885. It is found in Australia, where it has been recorded from South Australia and Victoria.
