= Hednota asterias =

Scientific classification
- Kingdom: Animalia
- Phylum: Arthropoda
- Clade: Pancrustacea
- Class: Insecta
- Order: Lepidoptera
- Family: Crambidae
- Subfamily: Crambinae
- Tribe: Chiloini
- Genus: Hednota
- Species: H. asterias

Binomial name
- Hednota asterias Meyrick, 1887

Species of moth

Hednota asterias is a moth in the family Crambidae. It was described by Edward Meyrick in 1887, after the species was found in Australia.
