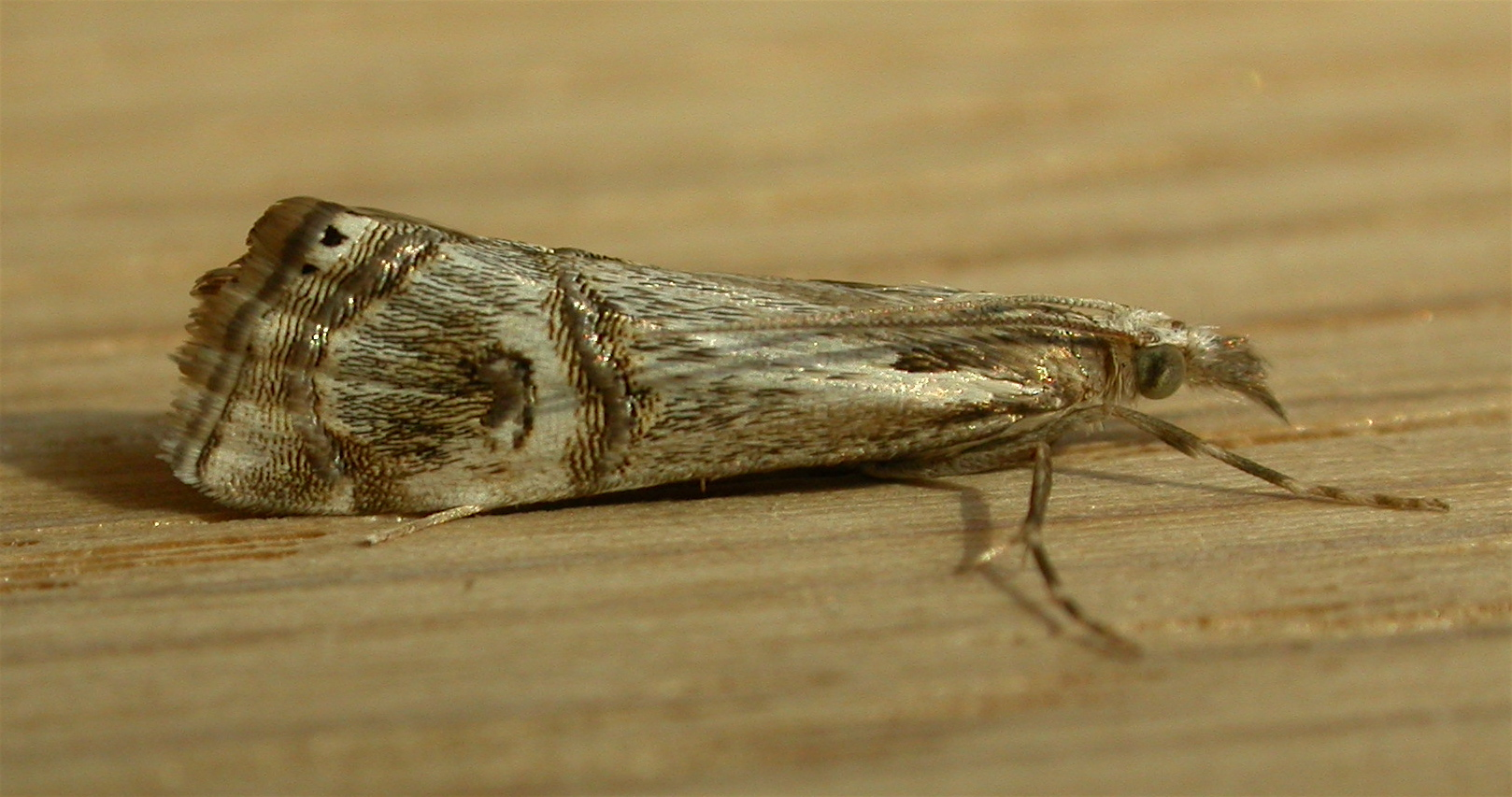

Scientific classification
- Kingdom: Animalia
- Phylum: Arthropoda
- Clade: Pancrustacea
- Class: Insecta
- Order: Lepidoptera
- Family: Crambidae
- Subfamily: Crambinae
- Tribe: Chiloini
- Genus: Hednota
- Species: H. longipalpella

Binomial name
- Hednota longipalpella (Meyrick, 1879)

Synonyms
- Eromene longipalpella Meyrick, 1879

= Hednota longipalpella =

Species of moth

Hednota longipalpella, the pasture webworm, is a moth species of the family Crambidae. It is found in most of mainland Australia.
