= Eudonia homala =

Scientific classification
- Kingdom: Animalia
- Phylum: Arthropoda
- Class: Insecta
- Order: Lepidoptera
- Family: Crambidae
- Genus: Eudonia
- Species: E. homala

Binomial name
- Eudonia homala (Meyrick, 1885)

Synonyms
- Scoparia homala Meyrick, 1885

Species of moth

Eudonia homala is a moth in the family Crambidae. It was described by Edward Meyrick in 1885. It is found in Australia, where it has been recorded from South Australia.

The wingspan is 15–18 mm. The forewings are whitish ochreous, irrorated (sprinkled) with black. There are black scales, forming longitudinal streaks at the base. The first line is whitish ochreous, margined by black posteriorly. The second line is whitish ochreous, margined by blackish anteriorly. The hindwings are ochreous-grey whitish, with a greyer postmedian line and hindmarginal suffusion. Adults have been recorded on wing in October.
