= Phanomorpha orthogramma =

Scientific classification
- Domain: Eukaryota
- Kingdom: Animalia
- Phylum: Arthropoda
- Class: Insecta
- Order: Lepidoptera
- Family: Crambidae
- Genus: Phanomorpha
- Species: P. orthogramma

Binomial name
- Phanomorpha orthogramma (Lower, 1902)

Synonyms
- Pionea orthogramma Lower, 1902; Phanomorpha leucoxantha Turner, 1937

Species of moth

Phanomorpha orthogramma is a moth in the family Crambidae. It was described by Oswald Bertram Lower in 1902. It is found in Australia, where it has been recorded from New South Wales and Queensland.
