= Pyrausta oenochrois =

Scientific classification
- Kingdom: Animalia
- Phylum: Arthropoda
- Class: Insecta
- Order: Lepidoptera
- Family: Crambidae
- Genus: Pyrausta
- Species: P. oenochrois

Binomial name
- Pyrausta oenochrois (Meyrick, 1889)

Synonyms
- Thinasotia oenochrois Meyrick, 1889

Species of moth

Pyrausta oenochrois is a moth in the family Crambidae. It was described by Edward Meyrick in 1889. It is found on New Guinea.
