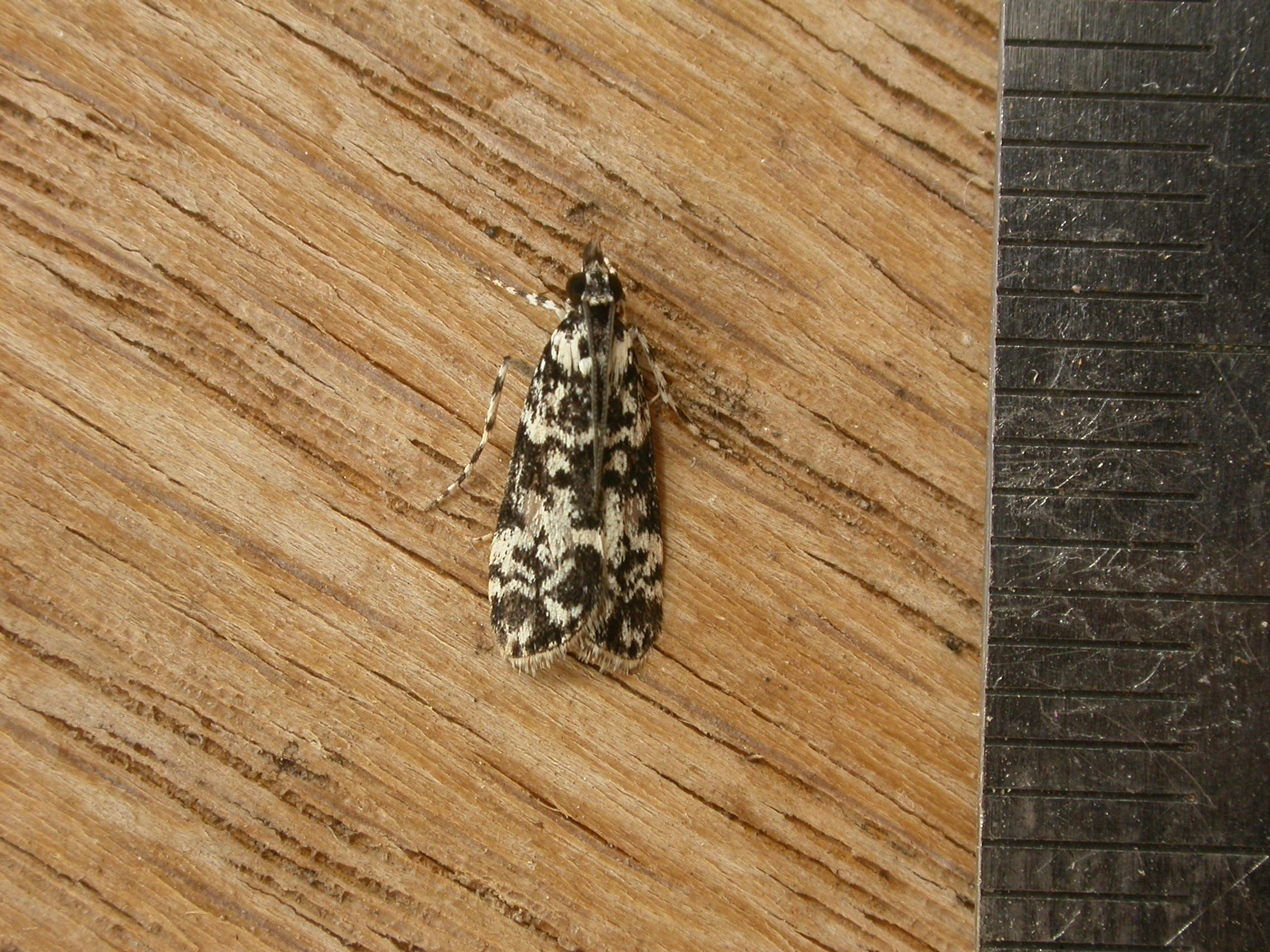
- Scoparia exhibitalis (Walker, 1855), to MV light, Aranda, ACT, 19/20 March 2010

Scientific classification
- Kingdom: Animalia
- Phylum: Arthropoda
- Class: Insecta
- Order: Lepidoptera
- Family: Crambidae
- Genus: Scoparia
- Species: S. exhibitalis

Binomial name
- Scoparia exhibitalis Walker, [1866]

Synonyms
- Scoparia atropicta Hampson, 1897

= Scoparia exhibitalis =

Species of moth

Scoparia exhibitalis is a moth in the family Crambidae. It was described by Francis Walker in 1866. It is found in Australia, where it has been recorded from New South Wales.

The wingspan is about 23 mm. The forewings are black, variegated with white and with numerous white patches on the basal area. The antemedial line is white with a white patch beyond it at the middle. There is also a large white postmedial patch with two black spots on it. The postmedial line is black, outwardly edged with white. The hindwings are yellowish, suffused with fuscous.
