= Scoparia meyrickii =

Scientific classification
- Kingdom: Animalia
- Phylum: Arthropoda
- Class: Insecta
- Order: Lepidoptera
- Family: Crambidae
- Genus: Scoparia
- Species: S. meyrickii

Binomial name
- Scoparia meyrickii (Butler, 1882)

Synonyms
- Tetraprosopus meyrickii Butler, 1882

Species of moth

Scoparia meyrickii is a moth in the family Crambidae. It was described by Arthur Gardiner Butler in 1882. It is found in Australia, where it has been recorded from Victoria, New South Wales and South Australia.

The wingspan is about 26 mm. The forewings are greyish brown with black streaks between the veins. The basal four-fifths is speckled with large white scales. The hindwings are grey with a blackish marginal area. The costal border is white.

Adults can be found on the trunks of fibrous-barked Eucalyptus species in November and December. It is probable that the larvae feed in the bark of these trees.
