= Hednota megalarcha =

Scientific classification
- Kingdom: Animalia
- Phylum: Arthropoda
- Clade: Pancrustacea
- Class: Insecta
- Order: Lepidoptera
- Family: Crambidae
- Subfamily: Crambinae
- Tribe: Chiloini
- Genus: Hednota
- Species: H. megalarcha

Binomial name
- Hednota megalarcha (Meyrick, 1885)

Synonyms
- Thinasotia megalarcha Meyrick, 1885; Thisanotia pedalarcha Hampson, 1896

Species of moth

Hednota megalarcha is a moth in the family Crambidae. It was described by Edward Meyrick in 1885. It is found in Australia, where it has been recorded from New South Wales.
