= Hednota xiphosema =

Scientific classification
- Kingdom: Animalia
- Phylum: Arthropoda
- Clade: Pancrustacea
- Class: Insecta
- Order: Lepidoptera
- Family: Crambidae
- Subfamily: Crambinae
- Tribe: Chiloini
- Genus: Hednota
- Species: H. xiphosema

Binomial name
- Hednota xiphosema (Turner, 1904)

Synonyms
- Talis xiphosema Turner, 1904

Species of moth

Hednota xiphosema is a moth in the family Crambidae. It was described by Alfred Jefferis Turner in 1904. It is found in Australia, where it has been recorded from Victoria.
