= Hednota recurvellus =

Scientific classification
- Kingdom: Animalia
- Phylum: Arthropoda
- Clade: Pancrustacea
- Class: Insecta
- Order: Lepidoptera
- Family: Crambidae
- Subfamily: Crambinae
- Tribe: Chiloini
- Genus: Hednota
- Species: H. recurvellus

Binomial name
- Hednota recurvellus (Walker, 1863)

Synonyms
- Crambus recurvellus Walker, 1863

Species of moth

Hednota recurvellus is a moth in the family Crambidae. It was described by Francis Walker in 1863. It is found in Australia, where it has been recorded from Western Australia.
