= Hednota hoplitellus =

Scientific classification
- Kingdom: Animalia
- Phylum: Arthropoda
- Clade: Pancrustacea
- Class: Insecta
- Order: Lepidoptera
- Family: Crambidae
- Subfamily: Crambinae
- Tribe: Chiloini
- Genus: Hednota
- Species: H. hoplitellus

Binomial name
- Hednota hoplitellus (Meyrick, 1879)

Synonyms
- Crambus hoplitellus Meyrick, 1879

Species of moth

Hednota hoplitellus is a moth in the family Crambidae. It was described by Edward Meyrick in 1879. It is found in Australia, where it has been recorded from New South Wales.
