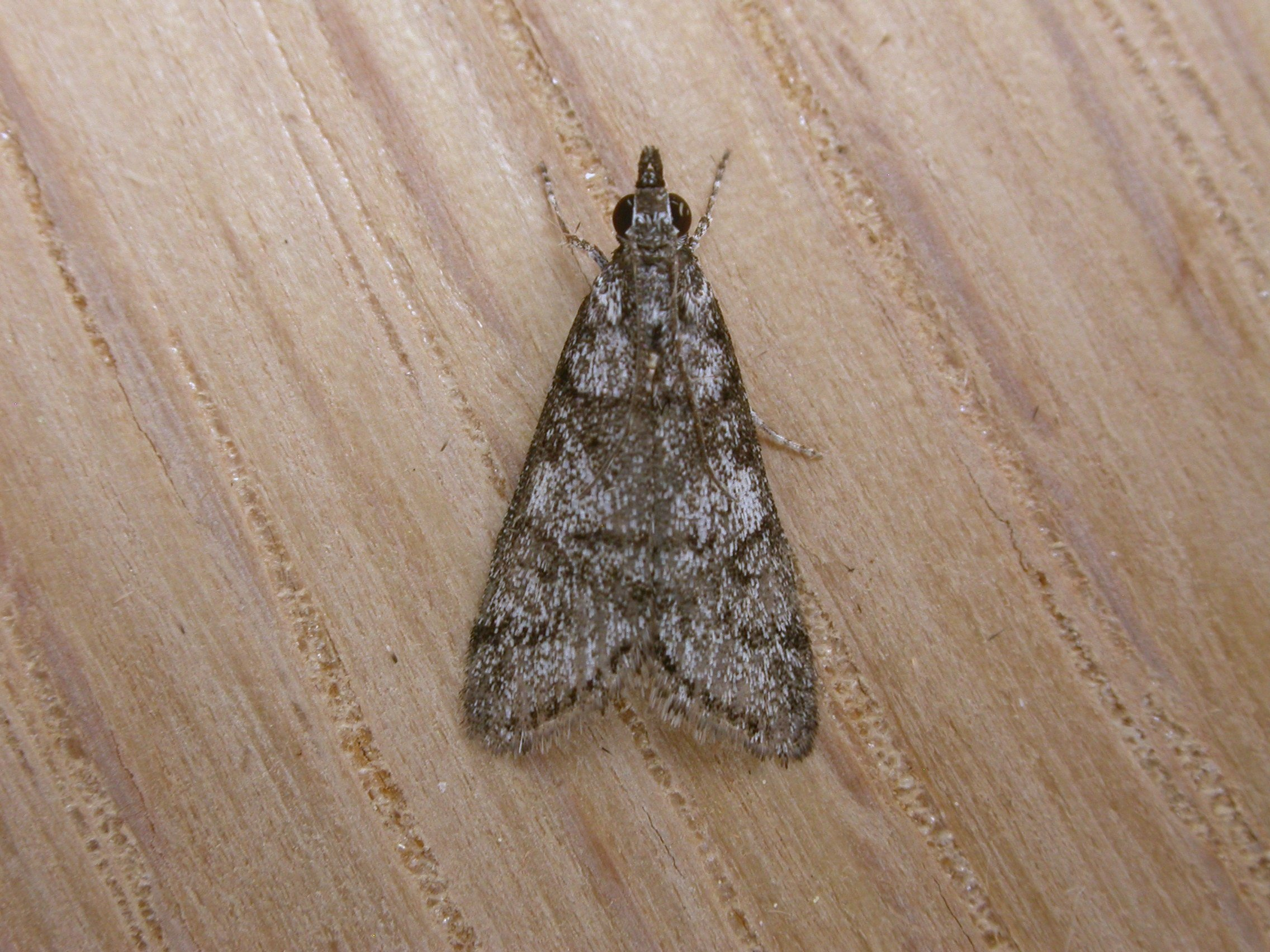

Scientific classification
- Kingdom: Animalia
- Phylum: Arthropoda
- Class: Insecta
- Order: Lepidoptera
- Family: Crambidae
- Genus: Scoparia
- Species: S. paracycla

Binomial name
- Scoparia paracycla (Lower, 1902)

Synonyms
- Tetraprosopus paracycla Lower, 1902; Metasia adoxodes Turner, 1908

= Scoparia paracycla =

Species of moth

Scoparia paracycla is a moth in the family Crambidae. It was described by Oswald Bertram Lower in 1902. It is found in Australia, where it has been recorded from New South Wales and Queensland.

The wingspan is about 14 mm. The forewings are ashy-grey whitish with fine black lines and a fuscous dot near the base in the middle. There is a roundish, whitish spot in end of the cell, edged anteriorly with blackish. There is a row of fine black terminal spots. Adults have been recorded on wing in October.
