= Hednota bifractellus =

Scientific classification
- Kingdom: Animalia
- Phylum: Arthropoda
- Clade: Pancrustacea
- Class: Insecta
- Order: Lepidoptera
- Family: Crambidae
- Subfamily: Crambinae
- Tribe: Chiloini
- Genus: Hednota
- Species: H. bifractellus

Binomial name
- Hednota bifractellus (Walker, 1863)

Synonyms
- Crambus bifractellus Walker, 1863

Species of moth

Hednota bifractellus is a moth in the family Crambidae. It was described by Francis Walker in 1863. It is found in Australia, where it has been recorded from South Australia, the Northern Territory, Queensland and New South Wales.
