= Scoparia leucomela =

Scientific classification
- Kingdom: Animalia
- Phylum: Arthropoda
- Class: Insecta
- Order: Lepidoptera
- Family: Crambidae
- Genus: Scoparia
- Species: S. leucomela

Binomial name
- Scoparia leucomela Lower, 1893

Species of moth

Scoparia leucomela is a moth in the family Crambidae. It was described by Oswald Bertram Lower in 1893. It is found in Australia, where it has been recorded from South Australia and Western Australia.

The wingspan is 22–25 mm. The forewings are silver grey, with a whitish costal edge and a blackish longitudinal line above the middle. All veins are outlined in black and the interspaces are filled with white. There is a fine black line along the inner margin from the middle to the anal angle. The hindwings are iridescent grey.
