= Hednota trissomochla =

Scientific classification
- Kingdom: Animalia
- Phylum: Arthropoda
- Clade: Pancrustacea
- Class: Insecta
- Order: Lepidoptera
- Family: Crambidae
- Subfamily: Crambinae
- Tribe: Chiloini
- Genus: Hednota
- Species: H. trissomochla

Binomial name
- Hednota trissomochla (Turner, 1911)

Synonyms
- Talis trissomochla Turner, 1911

Species of moth

Hednota trissomochla is a moth in the family Crambidae. It was described by Alfred Jefferis Turner in 1911. It is found in Australia, where it has been recorded from the Northern Territory.
