= Scoparia deliniens =

Scientific classification
- Kingdom: Animalia
- Phylum: Arthropoda
- Class: Insecta
- Order: Lepidoptera
- Family: Crambidae
- Genus: Scoparia
- Species: S. deliniens

Binomial name
- Scoparia deliniens T. P. Lucas, 1898

Species of moth

Scoparia deliniens is a moth in the family Crambidae. It was described by Thomas Pennington Lucas in 1898. It is found in Australia, where it has been recorded from Queensland.

The wingspan is 19–20 mm. The forewings are light fuscous, with a few indistinct black dots near the base and the costa. The hindwings are ochreous fuscous, diffused with light fuscous.
