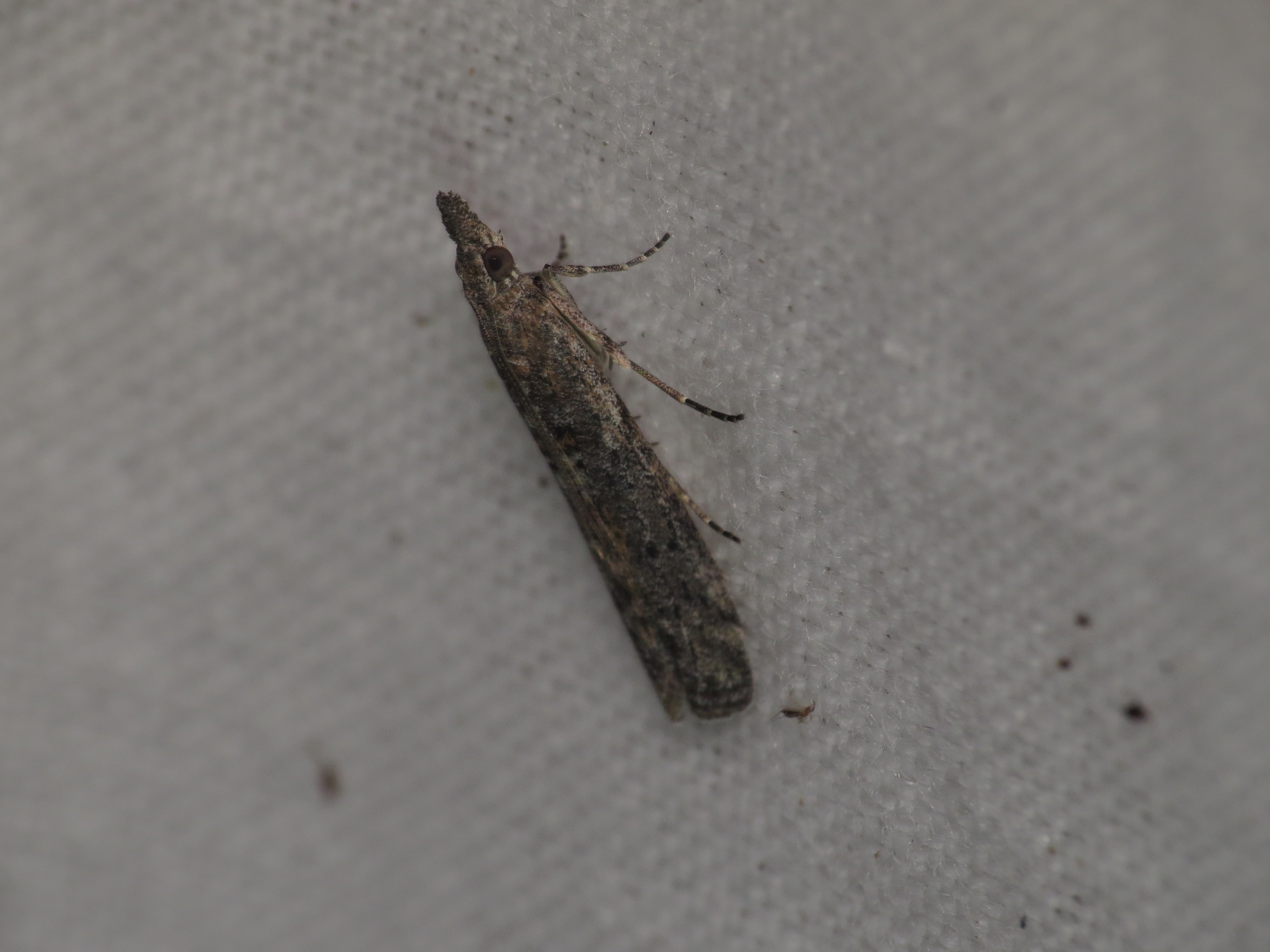
- Scoparia favilliferella (Walker, 1866), to actinic light, O'Connor, ACT, 3/4 December 2014

Scientific classification
- Kingdom: Animalia
- Phylum: Arthropoda
- Class: Insecta
- Order: Lepidoptera
- Family: Crambidae
- Genus: Scoparia
- Species: S. favilliferella

Binomial name
- Scoparia favilliferella (Walker, 1866)

Synonyms
- Nephopteryx favilliferella Walker, 1866; Xeroscopa encausta Meyrick, 1885

= Scoparia favilliferella =

Species of moth

Scoparia favilliferella is a moth in the family Crambidae. It was described by Francis Walker in 1866. It is found in Australia, where it has been recorded from Tasmania.

The wingspan is about 27 mm. The forewings are fuscous grey, irrorated (sprinkled) with white and with a black median streak, margined with fuscous. The hindwings are very pale whitish ochreous, tinged with greyish. The apex and upper part of the hindmargin are fuscous grey. Adults have been recorded on wing in December.
