= Hednota eremenopa =

Scientific classification
- Kingdom: Animalia
- Phylum: Arthropoda
- Clade: Pancrustacea
- Class: Insecta
- Order: Lepidoptera
- Family: Crambidae
- Subfamily: Crambinae
- Tribe: Chiloini
- Genus: Hednota
- Species: H. eremenopa

Binomial name
- Hednota eremenopa (Lower, 1903)

Synonyms
- Talis eremenopa Lower, 1903

Species of moth

Hednota eremenopa is a moth in the family Crambidae. It was described by Oswald Bertram Lower in 1903. It is found in Australia, where it has been recorded from Victoria.
