= Hednota empheres =

Scientific classification
- Kingdom: Animalia
- Phylum: Arthropoda
- Clade: Pancrustacea
- Class: Insecta
- Order: Lepidoptera
- Family: Crambidae
- Subfamily: Crambinae
- Tribe: Chiloini
- Genus: Hednota
- Species: H. empheres

Binomial name
- Hednota empheres Koch, 1966

Species of insect (moth)

Hednota empheres is a moth in the family Crambidae. It was described by L. E. Koch in 1966. It is found in Australia, where it has been recorded from Western Australia.
