= Scoparia arcta =

Scientific classification
- Kingdom: Animalia
- Phylum: Arthropoda
- Class: Insecta
- Order: Lepidoptera
- Family: Crambidae
- Genus: Scoparia
- Species: S. arcta

Binomial name
- Scoparia arcta T. P. Lucas, 1898

Species of moth

Scoparia arcta is a moth in the family Crambidae. It was described by Thomas Pennington Lucas in 1898. It is found in Australia, where it has been recorded from Queensland.
