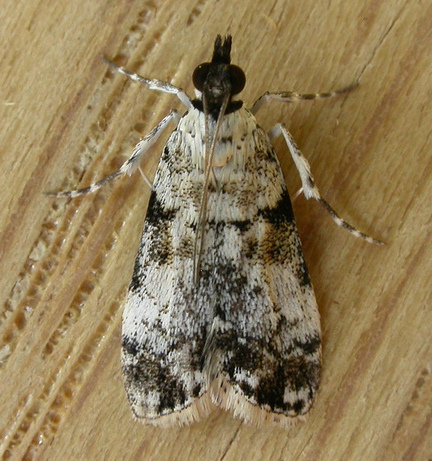

Scientific classification
- Kingdom: Animalia
- Phylum: Arthropoda
- Class: Insecta
- Order: Lepidoptera
- Family: Crambidae
- Genus: Scoparia
- Species: S. niphetodes

Binomial name
- Scoparia niphetodes Turner, 1931

= Scoparia niphetodes =

Species of moth

Scoparia niphetodes is a species of moth of the family Crambidae. It is found in Australia, where it has been recorded from Queensland.
