= Hednota diacentra =

Scientific classification
- Kingdom: Animalia
- Phylum: Arthropoda
- Clade: Pancrustacea
- Class: Insecta
- Order: Lepidoptera
- Family: Crambidae
- Subfamily: Crambinae
- Tribe: Chiloini
- Genus: Hednota
- Species: H. diacentra

Binomial name
- Hednota diacentra (Meyrick, 1897)

Synonyms
- Talis diacentra Meyrick, 1897

Species of moth

Hednota diacentra is a moth in the family Crambidae. It was described by Edward Meyrick in 1897. It is found in Australia, where it has been recorded from Victoria.
