= Hednota enchias =

Scientific classification
- Kingdom: Animalia
- Phylum: Arthropoda
- Clade: Pancrustacea
- Class: Insecta
- Order: Lepidoptera
- Family: Crambidae
- Subfamily: Crambinae
- Tribe: Chiloini
- Genus: Hednota
- Species: H. enchias

Binomial name
- Hednota enchias (Meyrick, 1897)

Synonyms
- Talis enchias Meyrick, 1897

Species of moth

Hednota enchias is a moth in the family Crambidae. It was described by Edward Meyrick in 1897. It is found in Australia, where it has been recorded from Tasmania.
