= Eudonia eremitis =

Scientific classification
- Kingdom: Animalia
- Phylum: Arthropoda
- Class: Insecta
- Order: Lepidoptera
- Family: Crambidae
- Genus: Eudonia
- Species: E. eremitis

Binomial name
- Eudonia eremitis (Meyrick, 1885)

Synonyms
- Scoparia eremitis Meyrick, 1885

Species of moth

Eudonia eremitis is a moth in the family Crambidae. It was described by Edward Meyrick in 1885. It is found in Australia, where it has been recorded from South Australia.

The wingspan is 18–21 mm. The forewings are fuscous grey, sprinkled with white. There are several small cloudy blackish spots towards the base. The hindwings are light grey, but darker posteriorly. Adults have been recorded on wing in October.
