= Hednota argyroeles =

Scientific classification
- Kingdom: Animalia
- Phylum: Arthropoda
- Clade: Pancrustacea
- Class: Insecta
- Order: Lepidoptera
- Family: Crambidae
- Subfamily: Crambinae
- Tribe: Chiloini
- Genus: Hednota
- Species: H. argyroeles

Binomial name
- Hednota argyroeles (Meyrick, 1882)

Synonyms
- Thinasotia argyroeles Meyrick, 1882; Talis argyroelis Hampson, 1896

Species of moth

Hednota argyroeles is a moth in the family Crambidae. It was described by Edward Meyrick in 1882. It is found in Australia, where it has been recorded from the Northern Territory and Queensland.
