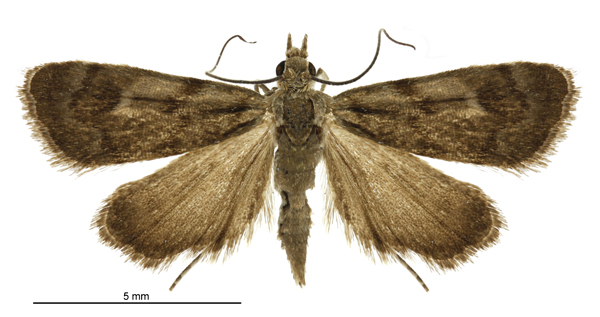
- Male

Scientific classification
- Kingdom: Animalia
- Phylum: Arthropoda
- Clade: Pancrustacea
- Class: Insecta
- Order: Lepidoptera
- Family: Crambidae
- Subfamily: Crambinae
- Tribe: Diptychophorini
- Genus: Glaucocharis
- Species: G. stella

Binomial name
- Glaucocharis stella Meyrick, 1938

Synonyms
- Pareromene gurri Gaskin, 1971

= Glaucocharis stella =

Species of moth endemic to New Zealand

Glaucocharis stella is a species of moth in the family Crambidae. This species was first described by Edward Meyrick in 1938. It is endemic to New Zealand and has been observed in the North Island. Meyrick hypothesised that larvae of G. stella feed on moss. Adults are on the wing in October and November. The colouration of the forewings ensure that when resting with closed wings on rocks adults are highly camouflaged.

== Taxonomy ==
This species was described by Edward Meyrick in 1938 using specimens collected by Stella Gibbs née Hudson collected in the Ōrongorongo Valley at an altitude of about 2,500 feet near Wellington and named Glaucocharis stella. George Hudson discussed and illustrated this species in his 1939 book A supplement to the butterflies and moths of New Zealand. In 1971 David Edward Gaskin, thinking he was describing a new species, named this moth Pareromene gurri. Gaskin synonymised this name with G. stella in 1985 when reclassifying Australasian, Melanesian and Polynesian Glaucocharis species. The male holotype specimen is held at the Natural History Museum, London.

== Description ==
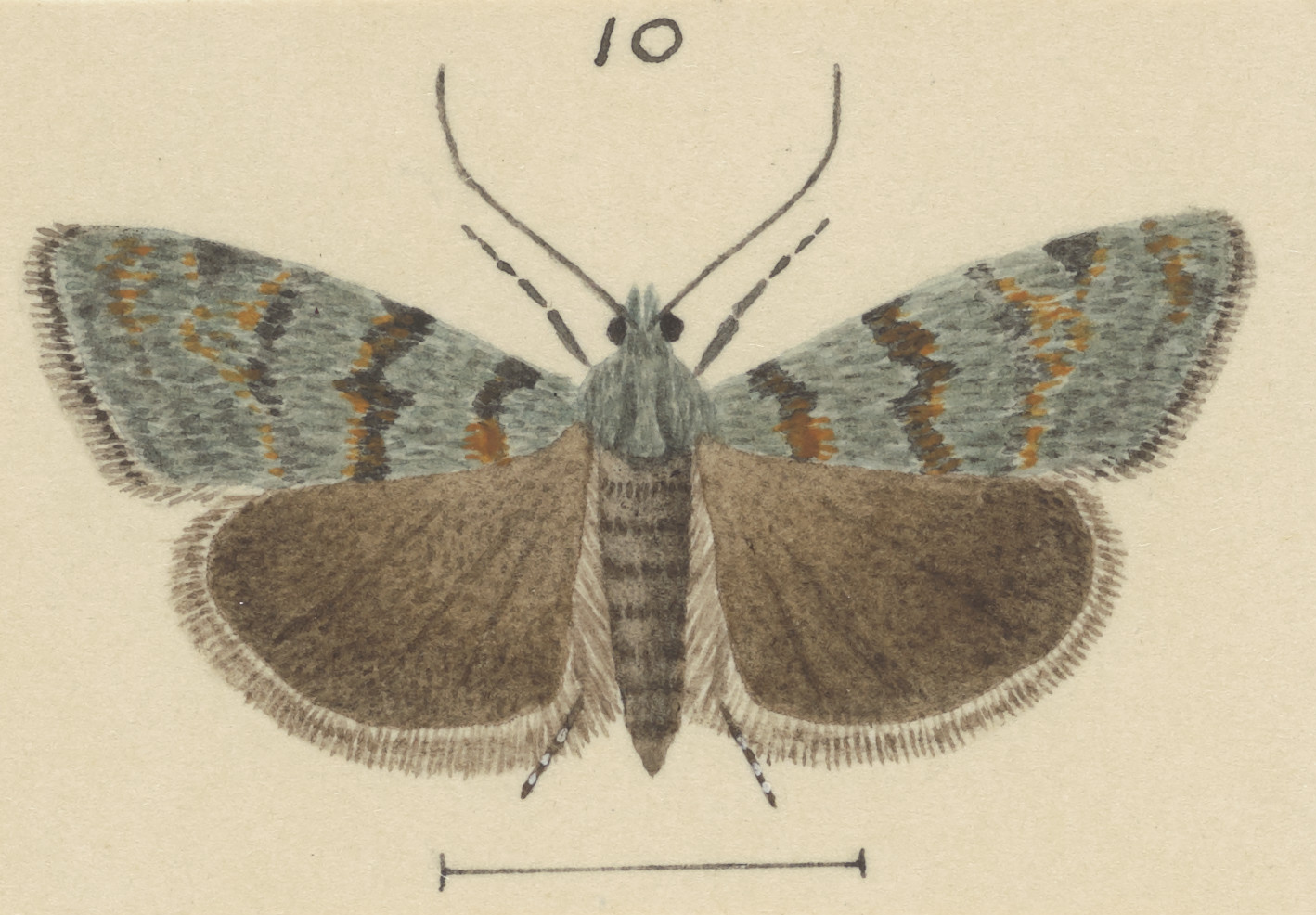
Illustration of female.

This species was described by Meyrick as follows:

♀.13 mm. Head grey. Palpi dark grey, whitish at base beneath. Antennae minutely pubescent. Thorax slate-grey. Fore-wings subtriangular, costa slightly arched, apex rounded, termen faintly bisinuate, somewhat oblique; bluish-slate-grey; extreme costal edge touched whitish from about 1/4 to 4/5; lines blackish, subbasal marked on costal half, first rather thick on costal half, from costa beyond 1/3 outwards-oblique to middle, acutely angled inwards and again on fold right-angled to dorsum beyond middle, mixed ochreous scales except near costa, second fine, waved, from costa beyond 2/3 outwards-oblique, strongly excurved on median third and sinuate to dorsum at 2/3, thus nearly approximated to first on dorsum, slightly mixed ochreous scales towards dorsum; discal spot oblique-oval, edged blackish and filled ochreous, lying within curve of second line, a small spot of blackish suffusion on costa obliquely before this; an obscure triangular apical patch of blackish-grey subterminal suffusion; an uneven black terminal line; cilia grey, a subbasal shade hardly darker, tips slightly mixed whitish. Hindwings grey; a moderate terminal fascia of dark grey suffusion; cilia grey, a darker subbasal shade, some slight whitish mixture beyond this.

Gaskin pointed out that this species is similar in appearance to G. epiphaea but that it can be distinguished by genitalic characteristics in both sexes. Externally the two species can be separated as the tornus of the forewing of G. stella is nearly at right angles where as in G. epiphaea the tornus of the forewing is more obtusely angled.

== Distribution ==
This species is endemic to New Zealand. G. stella have been observed in the North Island. Other than the type locality of the Ōrongorongo Valley, this specimen has also been observed in Auckland and when describing this species under the name P. gurri Gaskin used specimens collected in the Coromandel and at Mount Te Aroha.

== Habitat and hosts ==
Meyrick hypothesised that the larvae of G. stella were moss feeders.

== Behaviour ==
The adults are on the wing in October and November. As a result of their colouration adult moths are highly protected when resting with closed wings on rocks on the mountain side.
