= Glaucocharis cheesmani =

Scientific classification
- Kingdom: Animalia
- Phylum: Arthropoda
- Clade: Pancrustacea
- Class: Insecta
- Order: Lepidoptera
- Family: Crambidae
- Subfamily: Crambinae
- Tribe: Diptychophorini
- Genus: Glaucocharis
- Species: G. cheesmani

Binomial name
- Glaucocharis cheesmani (Gaskin, 1974)

Synonyms
- Pareromene cheesmani Gaskin, 1974

Species of moth

Glaucocharis cheesmani is a moth in the family Crambidae. It was described by David E. Gaskin in 1974. It is found on Vanuatu east of Australia.
