= Glaucocharis ajaxella =

Scientific classification
- Kingdom: Animalia
- Phylum: Arthropoda
- Clade: Pancrustacea
- Class: Insecta
- Order: Lepidoptera
- Family: Crambidae
- Subfamily: Crambinae
- Tribe: Diptychophorini
- Genus: Glaucocharis
- Species: G. ajaxella

Binomial name
- Glaucocharis ajaxella (Błeszyński, 1966)

Synonyms
- Pareromene ajaxella Błeszyński, 1966

Species of moth

Glaucocharis ajaxella is a moth in the family Crambidae. It was described by Stanisław Błeszyński in 1966. It is found in Papua New Guinea.
