= Glaucocharis euchromiella =

Scientific classification
- Kingdom: Animalia
- Phylum: Arthropoda
- Clade: Pancrustacea
- Class: Insecta
- Order: Lepidoptera
- Family: Crambidae
- Subfamily: Crambinae
- Tribe: Diptychophorini
- Genus: Glaucocharis
- Species: G. euchromiella

Binomial name
- Glaucocharis euchromiella (Ragonot, 1895)

Synonyms
- Diptychophora euchromiella Ragonot, 1895; Diptychophora sinualis Hampson, 1900; Pareromene rebeli Osthelder, 1941

Species of moth

Glaucocharis euchromiella is a species of moth in the family Crambidae described by Émile Louis Ragonot in 1895. It is found on Crete and in Syria, Armenia and the Taurus and Antitaurus Mountains.
