= Glaucocharis novaehebridensis =

Scientific classification
- Kingdom: Animalia
- Phylum: Arthropoda
- Clade: Pancrustacea
- Class: Insecta
- Order: Lepidoptera
- Family: Crambidae
- Subfamily: Crambinae
- Tribe: Diptychophorini
- Genus: Glaucocharis
- Species: G. novaehebridensis

Binomial name
- Glaucocharis novaehebridensis (Gaskin, 1974)

Synonyms
- Pareromene novaehebridensis Gaskin, 1974

Species of moth

Glaucocharis novaehebridensis is a moth in the family Crambidae. It was described by David E. Gaskin in 1974. It is found on the New Hebrides in the South Pacific.
