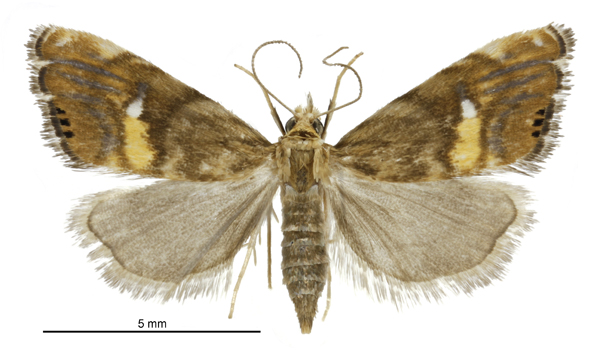
- Female
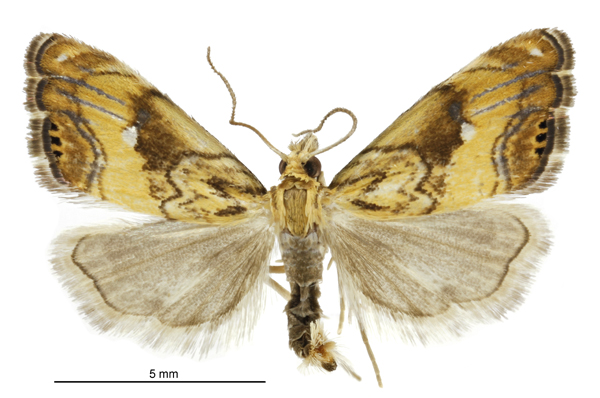
- Male

Scientific classification
- Kingdom: Animalia
- Phylum: Arthropoda
- Clade: Pancrustacea
- Class: Insecta
- Order: Lepidoptera
- Family: Crambidae
- Subfamily: Crambinae
- Tribe: Diptychophorini
- Genus: Glaucocharis
- Species: G. chrysochyta

Binomial name
- Glaucocharis chrysochyta (Meyrick, 1882)

Synonyms
- Diptychophora chrysochyta Meyrick, 1882; Pareromene chrysochyta (Meyrick, 1882); Diptychophora chrysoclyta Hampson, 1896 (misspelling of chrysochyta)

= Glaucocharis chrysochyta =

Species of moth

Glaucocharis chrysochyta is a species of moth in the family Crambidae. This species was first described by Edward Meyrick in 1882. It is endemic to New Zealand and is found throughout the country. It inhabits native forest. Larvae appear to feed on moss and likely pupate there. Adult moths are on the wing from November to March. They fly at night and are attracted to light.

== Taxonomy ==
This species was first described by Edward Meyrick in 1882 and named Diptychophora chrysochyta. Meyrick gave a fuller description of this species in 1883 and explained he based his description on two specimens collected in January amongst scrub. George Hudson discussed and illustrated this species under that name in his 1928 book The butterflies and moths of New Zealand. In 1929 Alfred Philpott studied the male genitalia of this species. In 1971 David Gaskin placed this species in the genus Pareromene. In 1985 Gaskin again discussed this species and placed it in the genus Glaucocharis. The male lectotype, collected at the Auckland Domain by Meyrick, is held at the Natural History Museum, London. The binomial of this species is occasionally misspelt as G. chrysoclyta.

== Description ==
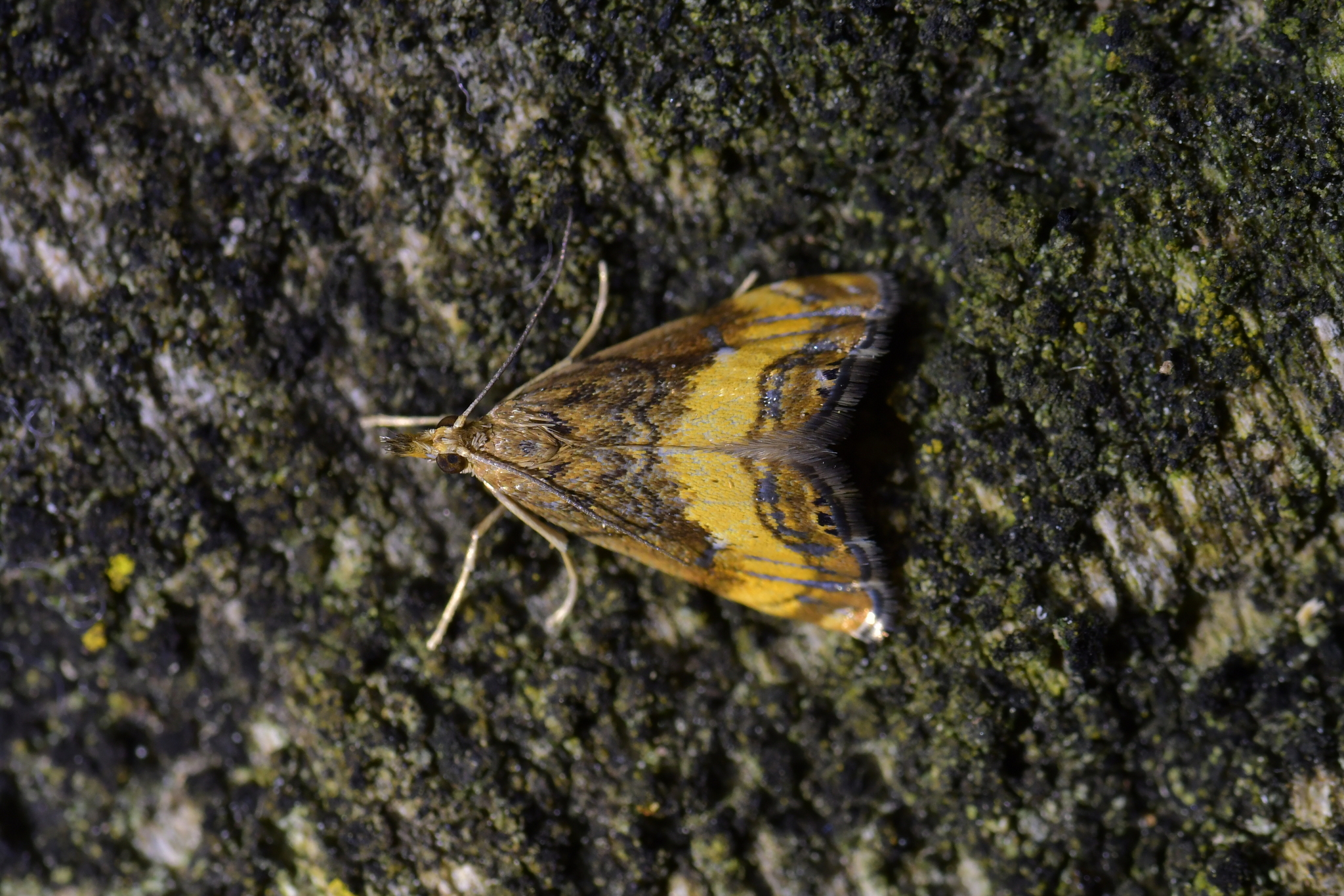
Live specimen

Meyrick described this species as follows:

Male. — 11 1/2— 12 mm. Head and thorax pale ochreous. Palpi ochreous-yellow, with a dark fuscous' spot at base and apical half dark fuscous, internally whitish-ochreous. Antenna whitish-ochreous. Abdomen whitish-ochreous-grey. Legs pale whitish-ochreous. Forewings triangular, very broad posteriorily, costa very gently arched, apex rounded, hindmargin oblique, sinuations moderately deep; light yellowish-ochreous, apex and hindmargin narrowly suffused with brownish, in one specimen basal half wholly suffused irregularly with brownish; a well-defined double dark fuscous transverse line from costa near base to inner margin before middle, very strongly curved outwards, dentate inwardly a little above inner margin, enclosing a pale line becoming almost clear white on inner margin; an oblique dark fuscous mark on costa beyond middle, giving rise to an indistinctly dentate suffused brown transverse line to middle of inner margin, which it hardly reaches; this line bounds the brown suffusion in the darker specimen; on it, rather above middle, is a small transverse 8-shaped spot, upper half leaden-metallic, lower half clear white; a slender rather irregular dark fuscous transverse line from costa at 2/3 to inner margin at 3/4, upper two-thirds very strongly curved outwards, lower half nearly followed by a similar line, diverging a little on inner margin; this line is preceded and followed on costa by a pale yellowish spot, and the space between it and the suffused median line is more distinctly yellow, especially below discal spot; an oblique pale yellowish mark on costa before apex, terminating in a rather metallic white dot; three slender longitudinal leaden-metallic streaks extending from discal spot to hindmargin, lowest one not reaching discal spot; a leaden metallic line within the second double tranverse line from below middle almost to inner margin; three small quadrate black spots on hindmargin near together below middle : cilia violet-metallic-grey, with a deeper basal line. Hindwings grey, with a dark fuscous hindmarginal line : cilia grey-whitish, with an indistinct darker line.

Hudson stated that this species is one of the smallest in this genus and is considerably variable in the depth of ground colouring. He also pointed out that the central band is sometimes light brown in colour rather than yellow.

== Distribution ==
G. chrysochyta is endemic to New Zealand. It can be found throughout the country.

== Habitat and hosts ==
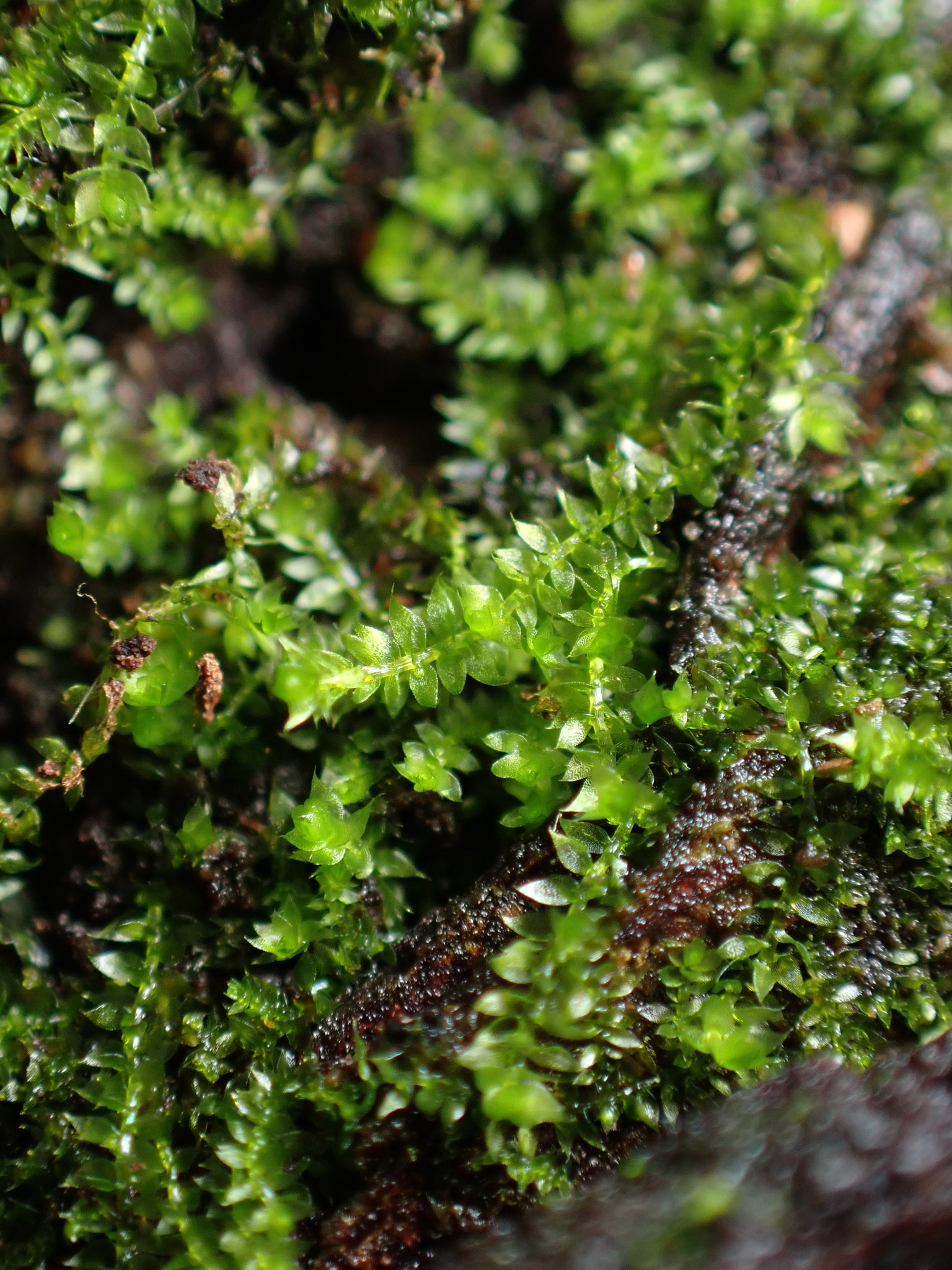
Likely larval host Fabronia australis.

This species inhabits both dense and open native forest and brushwood. Larvae have been found inhabiting Fabronia australis and it is likely they feed on this and other species of moss. It has been hypothesised that the larvae pupate within the moss they have been feeding on.

== Behaviour ==
Adults are on the wing from November to March. On warm days they can be disturbed from low lying vegetation and as a result Gaskin recommends sweep-netting at dusk to collect specimens. They fly at night and are attracted to light.
