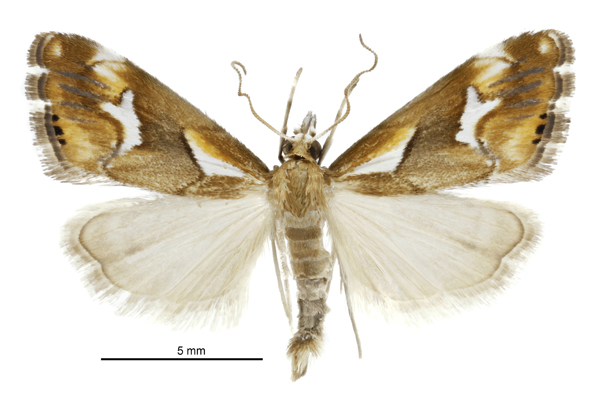
- Male

Scientific classification
- Kingdom: Animalia
- Phylum: Arthropoda
- Clade: Pancrustacea
- Class: Insecta
- Order: Lepidoptera
- Family: Crambidae
- Subfamily: Crambinae
- Tribe: Diptychophorini
- Genus: Glaucocharis
- Species: G. interruptus

Binomial name
- Glaucocharis interruptus (Felder, & Rogenhofer, 1875)

Synonyms
- Crambus interruptus C. Felder & Rogenhofer, 1875; Crambus interrupta (C. Felder & Rogenhofer, 1875); Diptychophora astrosema Meyrick, 1882; Diptychophora interrupta (Felder & Rogenhofer, 1875); Pareromene interrupta (Felder & Rogenhofer, 1875)

= Glaucocharis interruptus =

Species of moth endemic to New Zealand

Glaucocharis interruptus is a moth of the family Crambidae. It was first described by Cajetan von Felder, Rudolf Felder and Alois Friedrich Rogenhofer in 1875. It is endemic to New Zealand and is found in the North and South Islands. This species inhabits native forest and scrub at lowland and subalpine altitudes. It has been observed in scrub in river valleys or in mountain ravines. Larvae of Glaucocharis species feed on mosses and liverworts. Adults can be distinguished from similar appearing species by the Y-shaped reniform. They are on the wing from October to March and it is likely this species has two broods a year.

== Taxonomy ==
This species was first described by Cajetan von Felder and Alois Friedrich Rogenhofer in 1875 and named Crambus interruptus. In 1882 Edward Meyrick, thinking he was describing a new species, named the species Diptychophora astrosema. Meyrick went on to describe the species in detail under that name in 1883. In 1885 Meyrick placed this species in the genus Diptychophora under the name Diptychophora interrupta and synonymised Diptychophora astrosema within this species. George Hudson discussed and illustrated this species under the name Diptychophora interrupta in his 1928 book The butterflies and moths of New Zealand. In 1929 Alfred Philpott studied the male genitalia of this species. David Gaskin points out that the genitalia labelled D. selenaea in Philpott's publication are those of P. interruptus. In 1971 Gaskin placed this species in the genus Pareromene and discussed the species under the name Pareromene interrupta. However in 1985 Gaskin recognised that Glaucocharis must take precedence over Pareromene and placed G. interrupta into that genus. The male holotype specimen, collected by T. R. Oxley in Nelson, is held at the Natural History Museum, London.

== Description ==
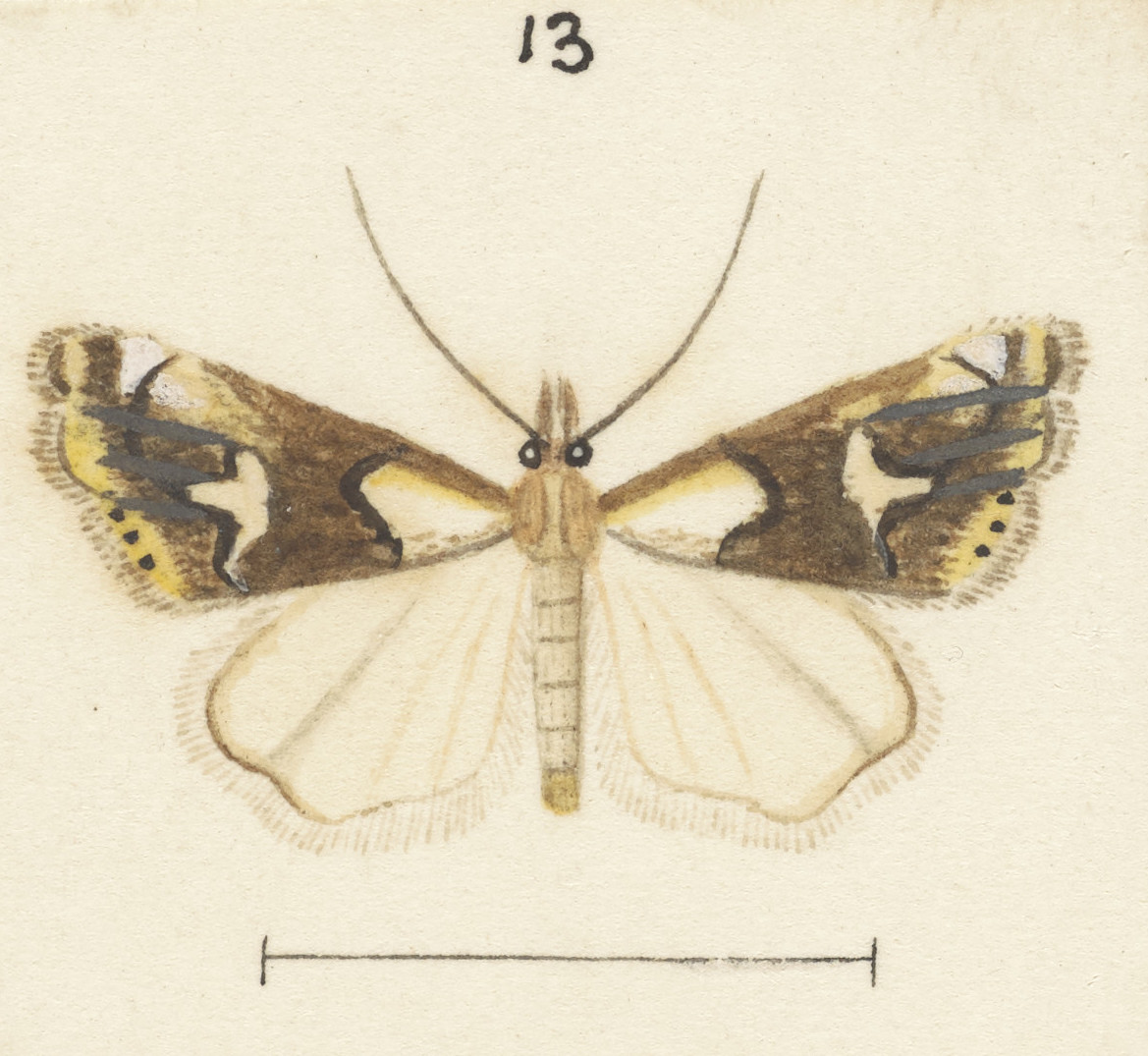
Illustration by Hudson.

Hudson described this species as follows:

The expansion of the wings is almost 3/4 inch. The fore-wings are pale brown; there is a large, triangular, white patch at the base, reaching as far as the first transverse line; a very large irregular but somewhat crescentic white mark near the middle; this spot is bounded.towards the termen by the second transverse line, which is very strongly curved; there is a pale yellow patch just above the central white’ spot, four dull, leaden metallic horizontal stripes between the central spot and the ter- men, and three irregular pale yellow spots near the termen; there are three black dots on the termen before the tornus. The hind-wings are very pale brownish-yellow, finely edged with brown near the apex.

This species is less variable that other species in the genus Glaucocharis. It can be distinguished from similar appearing species by the Y-shaped reniform.

== Distribution ==
This species is endemic to New Zealand. It can be found in the North and South Islands.

== Habitat and hosts ==
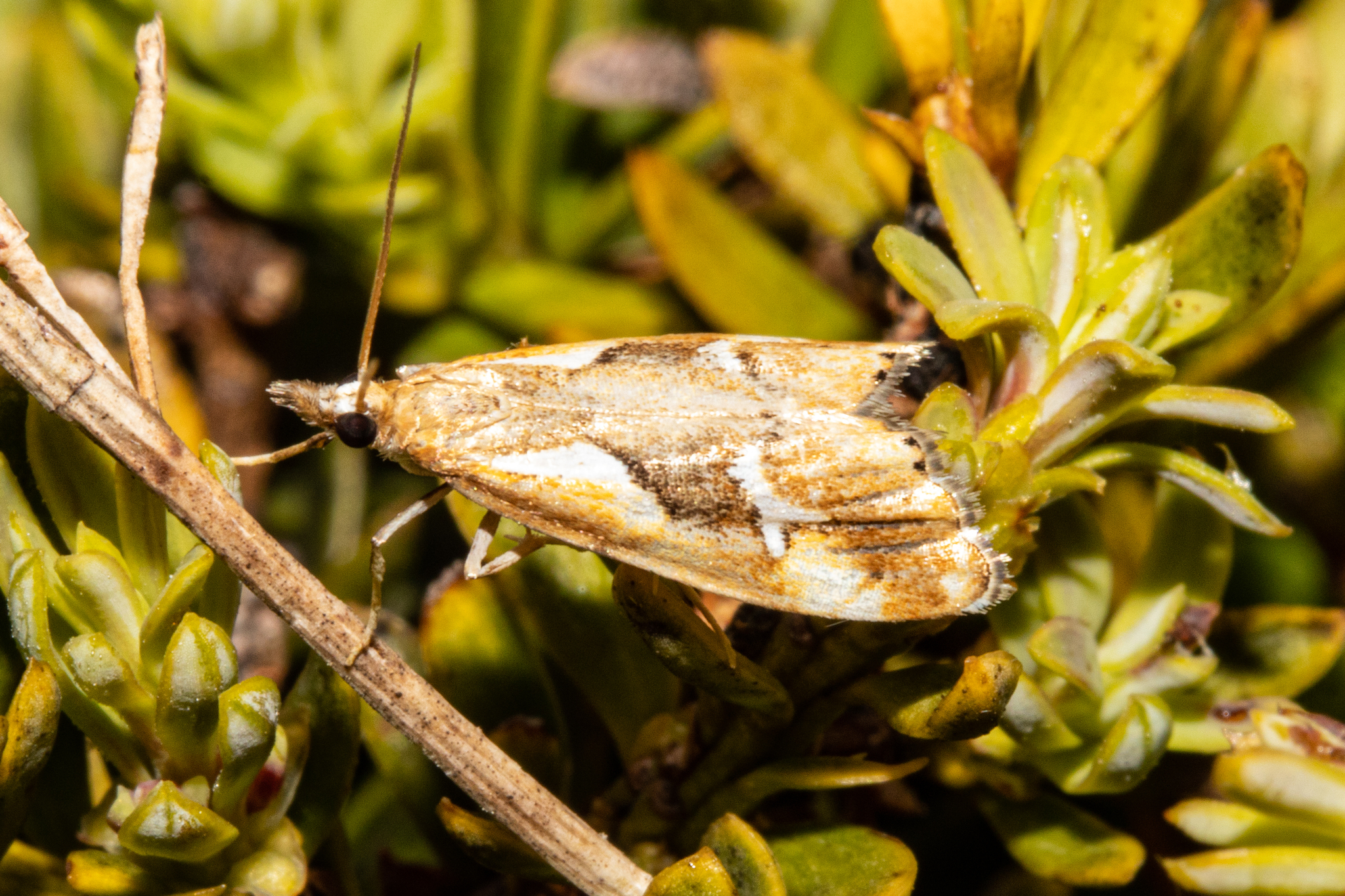
Live specimen

It inhabits native forest and shrubs at lowland to subalpine altitudes and can be observed in river valleys or mountain ravines. Larvae of Glaucocharis species feed on mosses and liverworts.

== Behaviour ==
Adults are on the wing in October to March. It is likely that this species has two broods per year.
