= Glaucocharis exsectella =

Scientific classification
- Kingdom: Animalia
- Phylum: Arthropoda
- Clade: Pancrustacea
- Class: Insecta
- Order: Lepidoptera
- Family: Crambidae
- Subfamily: Crambinae
- Tribe: Diptychophorini
- Genus: Glaucocharis
- Species: G. exsectella

Binomial name
- Glaucocharis exsectella (Christoph, 1881)

Synonyms
- Diptychophora exsectella Christoph, 1881; Diptychophora japonica Inoue, 1955

Species of moth

Glaucocharis exsectella is a moth in the family Crambidae. It was described by Hugo Theodor Christoph in 1881. It is found in the Russian Far East (Amur, Ussuri) and Japan.
