= Glaucocharis pauli =

Scientific classification
- Kingdom: Animalia
- Phylum: Arthropoda
- Clade: Pancrustacea
- Class: Insecta
- Order: Lepidoptera
- Family: Crambidae
- Subfamily: Crambinae
- Tribe: Diptychophorini
- Genus: Glaucocharis
- Species: G. pauli

Binomial name
- Glaucocharis pauli Gaskin, 1985

Species of moth

Glaucocharis pauli is a moth in the family Crambidae. It was described by David E. Gaskin in 1985. It is found in Australia, where it has been recorded from Queensland and Dauan Island.
