= Glaucocharis pogonias =

Scientific classification
- Kingdom: Animalia
- Phylum: Arthropoda
- Clade: Pancrustacea
- Class: Insecta
- Order: Lepidoptera
- Family: Crambidae
- Subfamily: Crambinae
- Tribe: Diptychophorini
- Genus: Glaucocharis
- Species: G. pogonias

Binomial name
- Glaucocharis pogonias (Turner, 1911)

Synonyms
- Diptychophora pogonias Turner, 1911

Species of moth

Glaucocharis pogonias is a moth in the family Crambidae. It was described by Turner in 1911. It is found in Australia, where it has been recorded from Queensland.
