= Glaucocharis muscela =

Scientific classification
- Kingdom: Animalia
- Phylum: Arthropoda
- Clade: Pancrustacea
- Class: Insecta
- Order: Lepidoptera
- Family: Crambidae
- Subfamily: Crambinae
- Tribe: Diptychophorini
- Genus: Glaucocharis
- Species: G. muscela

Binomial name
- Glaucocharis muscela (Fryer, 1912)

Synonyms
- Diptychophora muscela Fryer, 1912

Species of moth

Glaucocharis muscela is a moth in the family Crambidae. It was described by John Fryer in 1912. It is found in the Seychelles.
