= Glaucocharis maculosa =

Scientific classification
- Kingdom: Animalia
- Phylum: Arthropoda
- Clade: Pancrustacea
- Class: Insecta
- Order: Lepidoptera
- Family: Crambidae
- Subfamily: Crambinae
- Tribe: Diptychophorini
- Genus: Glaucocharis
- Species: G. maculosa

Binomial name
- Glaucocharis maculosa Bassi & Mey in Mey, 2011

Synonyms
- Glaucocharis maculata Mey, 2011

Species of moth

Glaucocharis maculosa is a moth in the family Crambidae. It was described by Graziano Bassi and Wolfram Mey in 2011. It is found in South Africa.
