= Glaucocharis queenslandensis =

Scientific classification
- Kingdom: Animalia
- Phylum: Arthropoda
- Clade: Pancrustacea
- Class: Insecta
- Order: Lepidoptera
- Family: Crambidae
- Subfamily: Crambinae
- Tribe: Diptychophorini
- Genus: Glaucocharis
- Species: G. queenslandensis

Binomial name
- Glaucocharis queenslandensis (Gaskin, 1975)

Synonyms
- Pareromene queenslandensis Gaskin, 1975

Species of moth

Glaucocharis queenslandensis is a moth in the family Crambidae. It was described by David E. Gaskin in 1975. It is found in Australia, where it has been recorded from Queensland.
