= Glaucocharis griseolalis =

Scientific classification
- Kingdom: Animalia
- Phylum: Arthropoda
- Clade: Pancrustacea
- Class: Insecta
- Order: Lepidoptera
- Family: Crambidae
- Subfamily: Crambinae
- Tribe: Diptychophorini
- Genus: Glaucocharis
- Species: G. griseolalis

Binomial name
- Glaucocharis griseolalis (Hampson, 1896)

Synonyms
- Diptychophora griseolalis Hampson, 1896

Species of moth

Glaucocharis griseolalis is a moth in the family Crambidae. It was described by George Hampson in 1896. It is found in India.
