= Glaucocharis fuscobasella =

Scientific classification
- Kingdom: Animalia
- Phylum: Arthropoda
- Clade: Pancrustacea
- Class: Insecta
- Order: Lepidoptera
- Family: Crambidae
- Subfamily: Crambinae
- Tribe: Diptychophorini
- Genus: Glaucocharis
- Species: G. fuscobasella

Binomial name
- Glaucocharis fuscobasella (Snellen, 1900)

Synonyms
- Diptychophora fuscobasella Snellen, 1900

Species of moth

Glaucocharis fuscobasella is a moth in the family Crambidae. It was described by Snellen in 1900. It is found in Indonesia, where it has been recorded from Java.
