= Glaucocharis burmanella =

Scientific classification
- Kingdom: Animalia
- Phylum: Arthropoda
- Clade: Pancrustacea
- Class: Insecta
- Order: Lepidoptera
- Family: Crambidae
- Subfamily: Crambinae
- Tribe: Diptychophorini
- Genus: Glaucocharis
- Species: G. burmanella

Binomial name
- Glaucocharis burmanella Gaskin in Wang, Gaskin & Sung, 1988

Species of moth

Glaucocharis burmanella is a moth in the family Crambidae. It was described by David E. Gaskin in 1988. It is found in Myanmar.
