= Glaucocharis senekai =

Scientific classification
- Kingdom: Animalia
- Phylum: Arthropoda
- Clade: Pancrustacea
- Class: Insecta
- Order: Lepidoptera
- Family: Crambidae
- Subfamily: Crambinae
- Tribe: Diptychophorini
- Genus: Glaucocharis
- Species: G. senekai

Binomial name
- Glaucocharis senekai (Ganev, 1987)

Synonyms
- Pareromene senekai Ganev, 1987

Species of moth

Glaucocharis senekai is a moth in the family Crambidae. It was described by Julius Ganev in 1987. It is found in Libya.
