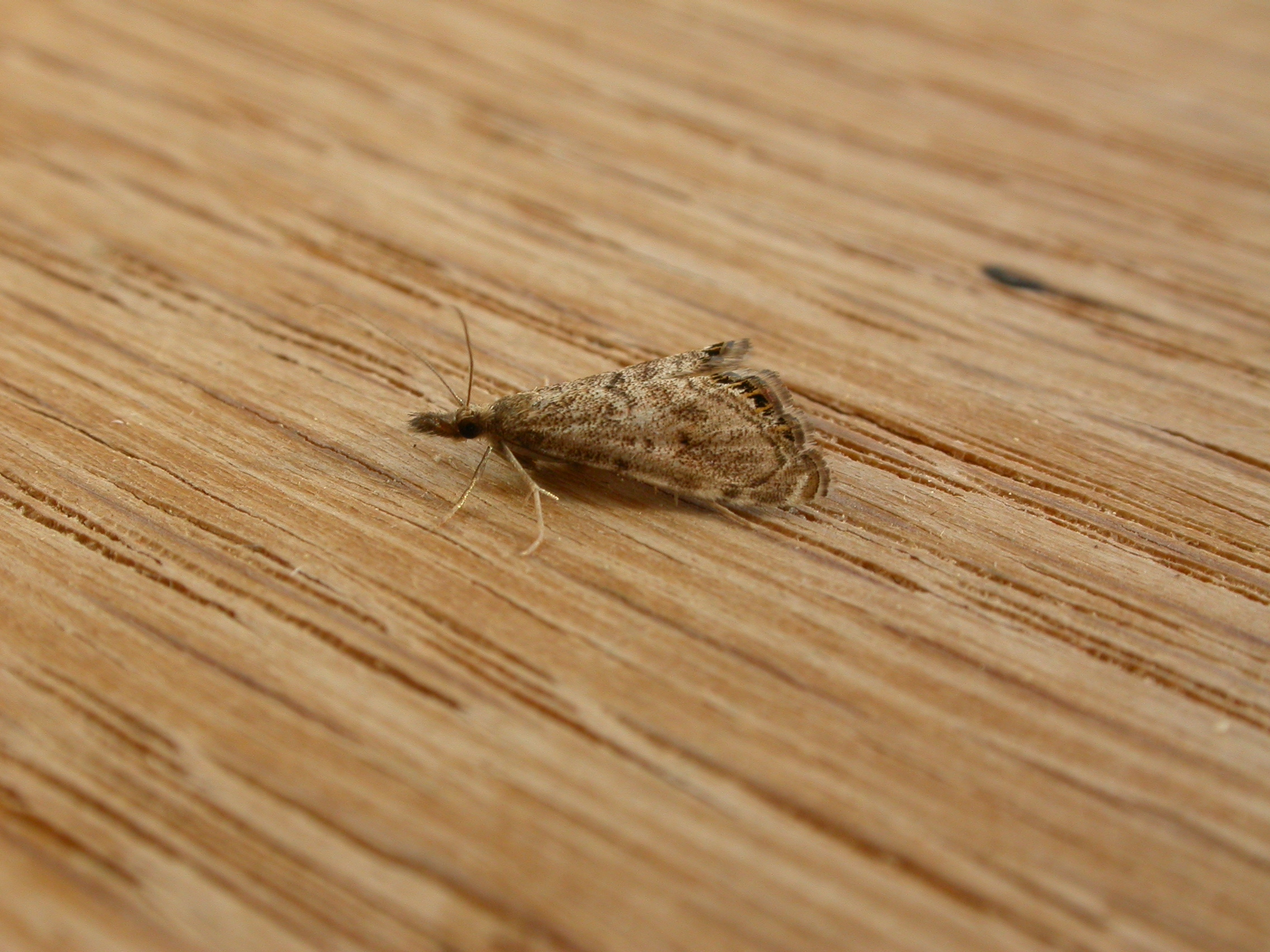

Scientific classification
- Kingdom: Animalia
- Phylum: Arthropoda
- Clade: Pancrustacea
- Class: Insecta
- Order: Lepidoptera
- Family: Crambidae
- Subfamily: Crambinae
- Tribe: Diptychophorini
- Genus: Glaucocharis
- Species: G. dilatella

Binomial name
- Glaucocharis dilatella (Meyrick, 1879)

Synonyms
- Eromene dilatella Meyrick, 1879

= Glaucocharis dilatella =

Species of moth

Glaucocharis dilatella is a moth of the family Crambidae described by Edward Meyrick in 1879. It is known from Australia, including South Australia, Tasmania, Queensland, New South Wales and Victoria.
