= Glaucocharis fusca =

Scientific classification
- Kingdom: Animalia
- Phylum: Arthropoda
- Clade: Pancrustacea
- Class: Insecta
- Order: Lepidoptera
- Family: Crambidae
- Subfamily: Crambinae
- Tribe: Diptychophorini
- Genus: Glaucocharis
- Species: G. fusca

Binomial name
- Glaucocharis fusca (Gaskin, 1974)

Synonyms
- Pareromene fusca Gaskin, 1974

Species of moth

Glaucocharis fusca is a moth in the family Crambidae. It was described by David E. Gaskin in 1974. It is found in the Solomon Islands.
