= Glaucocharis tripunctata =

Scientific classification
- Kingdom: Animalia
- Phylum: Arthropoda
- Clade: Pancrustacea
- Class: Insecta
- Order: Lepidoptera
- Family: Crambidae
- Subfamily: Crambinae
- Tribe: Diptychophorini
- Genus: Glaucocharis
- Species: G. tripunctata

Binomial name
- Glaucocharis tripunctata (Moore, 1888)

Synonyms
- Eromene tripunctata Moore, 1888

Species of moth

Glaucocharis tripunctata is a moth in the family Crambidae. It was described by Frederic Moore in 1888. It is found in India (Darjeeling, Uttar Pradesh, Assam) and Nepal.

== Subspecies ==
- Glaucocharis tripunctata tripunctata (India)
- Glaucocharis tripunctata grahami Gaskin in Wang, Gaskin & Sung, 1988 (India: Uttar Pradesh)
- Glaucocharis tripunctata pallescens Gaskin in Wang, Gaskin & Sung, 1988 (Nepal)
