= Glaucocharis dialitha =

Scientific classification
- Kingdom: Animalia
- Phylum: Arthropoda
- Clade: Pancrustacea
- Class: Insecta
- Order: Lepidoptera
- Family: Crambidae
- Subfamily: Crambinae
- Tribe: Diptychophorini
- Genus: Glaucocharis
- Species: G. dialitha

Binomial name
- Glaucocharis dialitha (Tams, 1935)

Synonyms
- Diptychophora dialitha Tams, 1935

Species of moth

Glaucocharis dialitha is a moth in the family Crambidae. It was described by Willie Horace Thomas Tams in 1935. It is found on Samoa.
