= Glaucocharis aeolocnemis =

Scientific classification
- Kingdom: Animalia
- Phylum: Arthropoda
- Clade: Pancrustacea
- Class: Insecta
- Order: Lepidoptera
- Family: Crambidae
- Subfamily: Crambinae
- Tribe: Diptychophorini
- Genus: Glaucocharis
- Species: G. aeolocnemis

Binomial name
- Glaucocharis aeolocnemis Meyrick, 1931

Synonyms
- Diptychophora aeolocnemis Meyrick, 1931; Pareromene aelocnemis Gaskin, 1974

Species of moth

Glaucocharis aeolocnemis is a moth in the family Crambidae. It was described by Edward Meyrick in 1931. It is found on Tagula Island in Papua New Guinea's Louisiade Archipelago.
