= Glaucocharis ochracealis =

Scientific classification
- Kingdom: Animalia
- Phylum: Arthropoda
- Clade: Pancrustacea
- Class: Insecta
- Order: Lepidoptera
- Family: Crambidae
- Subfamily: Crambinae
- Tribe: Diptychophorini
- Genus: Glaucocharis
- Species: G. ochracealis

Binomial name
- Glaucocharis ochracealis (Walker, 1866)

Synonyms
- Cataclysta ochracealis Walker, 1866; Eromene praematurella Meyrick, 1879

Species of moth

Glaucocharis ochracealis is a moth in the family Crambidae. It was described by Francis Walker in 1866. It is found in Australia, where it has been recorded from New South Wales.
