= Glaucocharis chelatella =

Scientific classification
- Kingdom: Animalia
- Phylum: Arthropoda
- Clade: Pancrustacea
- Class: Insecta
- Order: Lepidoptera
- Family: Crambidae
- Subfamily: Crambinae
- Tribe: Diptychophorini
- Genus: Glaucocharis
- Species: G. chelatella

Binomial name
- Glaucocharis chelatella Wang & Sung in Wang, Gaskin & Sung, 1988

Species of moth

Glaucocharis chelatella is a moth in the family Crambidae native to China (Yunnan). It was described by Wang and Sung in 1988.
