= Glaucocharis electra =

Scientific classification
- Kingdom: Animalia
- Phylum: Arthropoda
- Clade: Pancrustacea
- Class: Insecta
- Order: Lepidoptera
- Family: Crambidae
- Subfamily: Crambinae
- Tribe: Diptychophorini
- Genus: Glaucocharis
- Species: G. electra

Binomial name
- Glaucocharis electra (Błeszyński, 1965)

Synonyms
- Pareromene electra Błeszyński, 1965

Species of moth

Glaucocharis electra is a moth in the family Crambidae. It was described by Stanisław Błeszyński in 1965. It is found in Zhejiang, China.
