= Glaucocharis utsugii =

Scientific classification
- Kingdom: Animalia
- Phylum: Arthropoda
- Clade: Pancrustacea
- Class: Insecta
- Order: Lepidoptera
- Family: Crambidae
- Subfamily: Crambinae
- Tribe: Diptychophorini
- Genus: Glaucocharis
- Species: G. utsugii

Binomial name
- Glaucocharis utsugii Sasaki, 2007

Species of moth

Glaucocharis utsugii is a moth in the family Crambidae. It was described by Sasaki in 2007. It is found in Japan, where it has been recorded from Okinawa Island.
