= Glaucocharis quadratella =

Scientific classification
- Kingdom: Animalia
- Phylum: Arthropoda
- Clade: Pancrustacea
- Class: Insecta
- Order: Lepidoptera
- Family: Crambidae
- Subfamily: Crambinae
- Tribe: Diptychophorini
- Genus: Glaucocharis
- Species: G. quadratella

Binomial name
- Glaucocharis quadratella Song & Chen in Chen, Song & Yuan, 2001

Species of moth

Glaucocharis quadratella is a moth in the family Crambidae. It was described by Shi-Mei Song and Tie-Mei Chen in 2001. It is found in Guangxi, China.
