= Glaucocharis incisella =

Scientific classification
- Kingdom: Animalia
- Phylum: Arthropoda
- Clade: Pancrustacea
- Class: Insecta
- Order: Lepidoptera
- Family: Crambidae
- Subfamily: Crambinae
- Tribe: Diptychophorini
- Genus: Glaucocharis
- Species: G. incisella

Binomial name
- Glaucocharis incisella (Błeszyński, 1970)

Synonyms
- Pareromene incisella Błeszyński, 1970

Species of moth

Glaucocharis incisella is a moth in the family Crambidae. It was described by Stanisław Błeszyński in 1970. It is found in Sri Lanka.
