= Glaucocharis propepraemialis =

Scientific classification
- Kingdom: Animalia
- Phylum: Arthropoda
- Clade: Pancrustacea
- Class: Insecta
- Order: Lepidoptera
- Family: Crambidae
- Subfamily: Crambinae
- Tribe: Diptychophorini
- Genus: Glaucocharis
- Species: G. propepraemialis

Binomial name
- Glaucocharis propepraemialis (Gaskin, 1974)

Synonyms
- Pareromene propepraemialis Gaskin, 1974

Species of moth

Glaucocharis propepraemialis is a moth in the family Crambidae. It was described by David Edward Gaskin in 1974. It is found on the New Hebrides.
