= Glaucocharis albilinealis =

Scientific classification
- Kingdom: Animalia
- Phylum: Arthropoda
- Clade: Pancrustacea
- Class: Insecta
- Order: Lepidoptera
- Family: Crambidae
- Subfamily: Crambinae
- Tribe: Diptychophorini
- Genus: Glaucocharis
- Species: G. albilinealis

Binomial name
- Glaucocharis albilinealis (Hampson, 1896)

Synonyms
- Diptychophora albilinealis Hampson, 1896; Diptychophora immitis Meyrick, 1931; Glaucocharis albilinealis occidentalis Gaskin in Wang, Gaskin & Sung, 1988; Glaucocharis albilinealis similis Wang, Gaskin & Sung, 1988

Species of moth

Glaucocharis albilinealis is a moth in the family Crambidae. It was described by George Hampson in 1896. It is found in Myanmar and India (Assam, Bengal).
