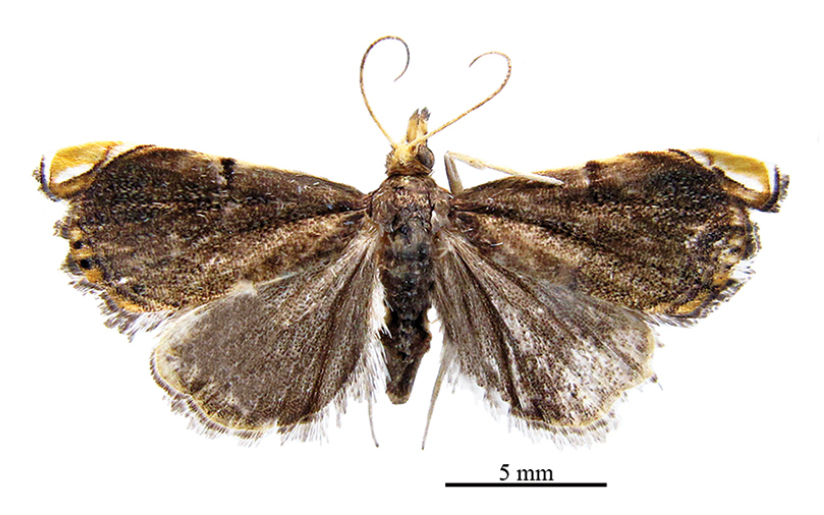
- Glaucocharis castaneus

Scientific classification
- Kingdom: Animalia
- Phylum: Arthropoda
- Clade: Pancrustacea
- Class: Insecta
- Order: Lepidoptera
- Family: Crambidae
- Subfamily: Crambinae
- Tribe: Diptychophorini
- Genus: Glaucocharis
- Species: G. castaneus

Binomial name
- Glaucocharis castaneus Chen, Song, Yuan & Zhang, 2004

= Glaucocharis castaneus =

Species of moth

Glaucocharis castaneus is a moth in the family Crambidae. It was described by Tie-Mei Chen, Shi-Mei Song, De-Cheng Yuan and Guang-Xue Zhang in 2004. It is found in Guangxi, China.
