= Glaucocharis batianensis =

Scientific classification
- Kingdom: Animalia
- Phylum: Arthropoda
- Clade: Pancrustacea
- Class: Insecta
- Order: Lepidoptera
- Family: Crambidae
- Subfamily: Crambinae
- Tribe: Diptychophorini
- Genus: Glaucocharis
- Species: G. batianensis

Binomial name
- Glaucocharis batianensis (Gaskin, 1974)

Synonyms
- Pareromene batianensis Gaskin, 1974

Species of moth

Glaucocharis batianensis is a moth in the family Crambidae. It was described by David E. Gaskin in 1974. It is found in Indonesia, where it has been recorded from Halmahera.
