= Glaucocharis bilinealis =

Scientific classification
- Kingdom: Animalia
- Phylum: Arthropoda
- Clade: Pancrustacea
- Class: Insecta
- Order: Lepidoptera
- Family: Crambidae
- Subfamily: Crambinae
- Tribe: Diptychophorini
- Genus: Glaucocharis
- Species: G. bilinealis

Binomial name
- Glaucocharis bilinealis (Amsel, 1961)

Synonyms
- Pagmania bilinealis Amsel, 1961

Species of moth

Glaucocharis bilinealis is a moth in the family Crambidae. It was described by Hans Georg Amsel in 1961. It is found in Afghanistan.
