= Glaucocharis molydocrossa =

Scientific classification
- Kingdom: Animalia
- Phylum: Arthropoda
- Clade: Pancrustacea
- Class: Insecta
- Order: Lepidoptera
- Family: Crambidae
- Subfamily: Crambinae
- Tribe: Diptychophorini
- Genus: Glaucocharis
- Species: G. molydocrossa

Binomial name
- Glaucocharis molydocrossa (Turner, 1904)

Synonyms
- Diptychophora molydocrossa Turner, 1904; Diptychophora microcyma Meyrick, 1931

Species of moth

Glaucocharis molydocrossa is a moth in the family Crambidae. It was described by Turner in 1904. It is found in Australia, where it has been recorded from Queensland.
