= Glaucocharis fijiensis =

Scientific classification
- Kingdom: Animalia
- Phylum: Arthropoda
- Clade: Pancrustacea
- Class: Insecta
- Order: Lepidoptera
- Family: Crambidae
- Subfamily: Crambinae
- Tribe: Diptychophorini
- Genus: Glaucocharis
- Species: G. fijiensis

Binomial name
- Glaucocharis fijiensis Gaskin, 1985

Species of moth

Glaucocharis fijiensis is a moth in the family Crambidae. It was described by David E. Gaskin in 1985. It is found on Fiji.
