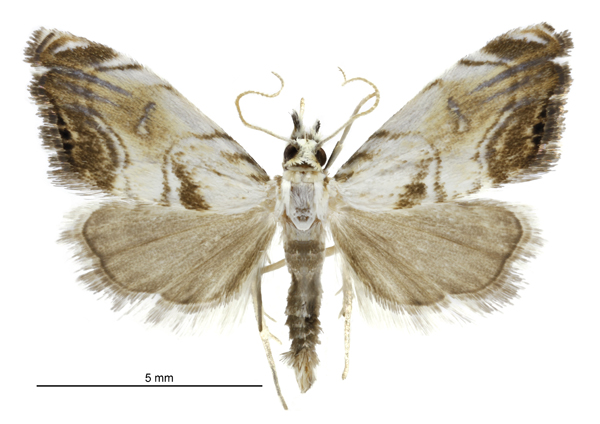
- Male

Scientific classification
- Kingdom: Animalia
- Phylum: Arthropoda
- Clade: Pancrustacea
- Class: Insecta
- Order: Lepidoptera
- Family: Crambidae
- Subfamily: Crambinae
- Tribe: Diptychophorini
- Genus: Glaucocharis
- Species: G. harmonica

Binomial name
- Glaucocharis harmonica (Meyrick, 1888)

Synonyms
- Diptychophora harmonica Meyrick, 1888; Pareromene harmonica (Meyrick, 1888)

= Glaucocharis harmonica =

Species of moth

Glaucocharis harmonica is a moth in the family Crambidae. This species was described by Edward Meyrick in 1888. It is endemic to New Zealand and is found in the North and South Islands. It inhabits lowland to subalpine native forest. It has been hypothesised that there are two broods per year. The larval hosts are unknown. Adults are on the wing from October until January.

== Taxonomy ==
This species was first described by Edward Meyrick in 1888 using specimens collected in the Waitākere Ranges in December and named Diptychophora harmonica. George Hudson discussed and illustrated this species under that name in his 1928 book The butterflies and moths of New Zealand. In 1929 Alfred Philpott studied the male genitalia of this species. However the labelling of the male genitalia drawing is confused with P. auriscriptella as the captions have been reversed. In 1971 David Gaskin placed this species in the genus Pareromene. In 1985 Gaskin again discussed this species and placed it in the genus Glaucocharis. The lectotype specimen is held at the Natural History Museum, London.

== Description ==
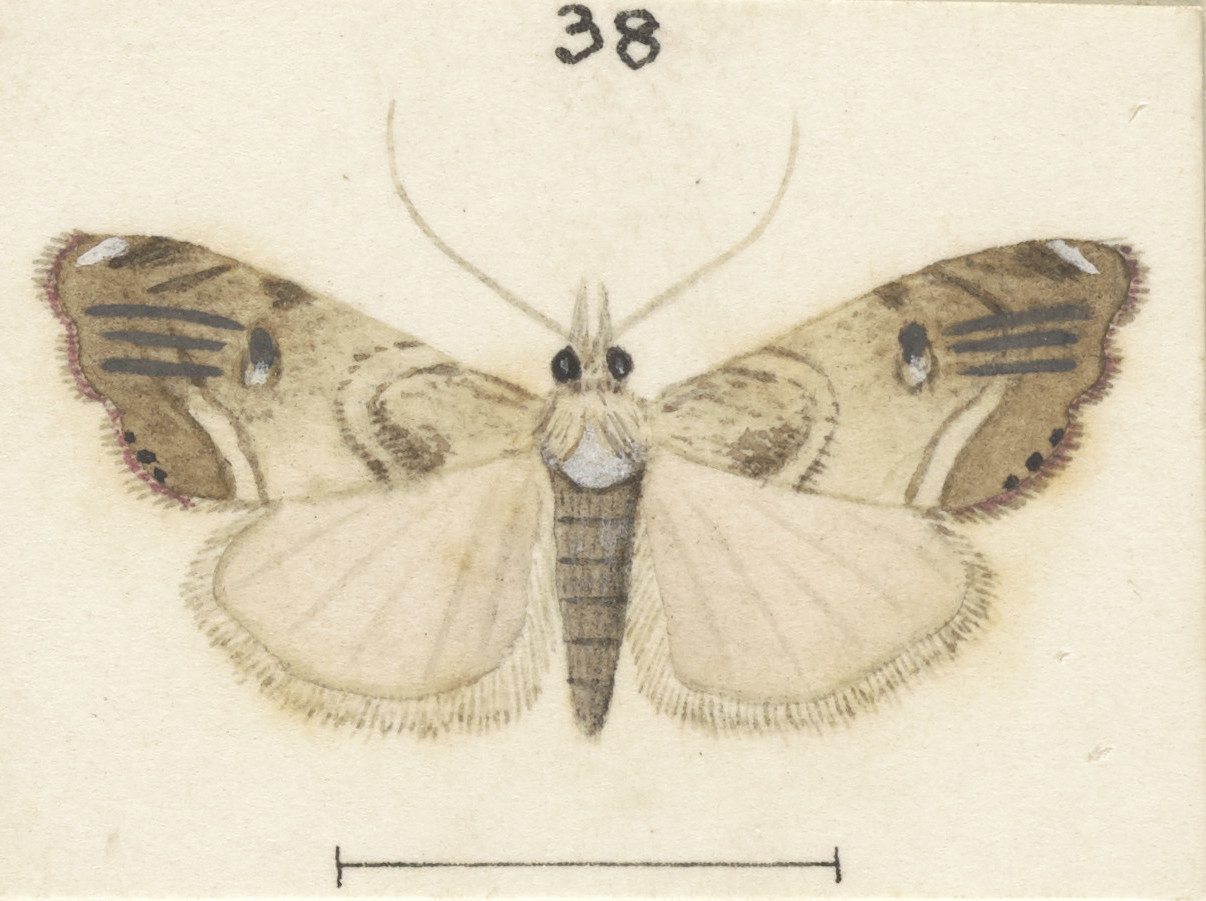
Illustration of the female

Meyrick described the species as follows:

Male. — 12-13 mm. Head white. Palpi white, externally ochreous-tinged, towards apex slightly infuscated. Antennae whitish. Thorax white, with a few fuscous scales. Abdomen light grey. Legs white. Forewings triangular, costa slightly arched, apex obtuse, hindmargin oblique, twice sinuate-indented on upper half; white, suffused with pale ochreous-greyish except towards inner margin; lines very slender, dark fuscous, thickened at extremities; first from beyond 1/4 of costa to middle of inner margin, strongly curved, nearly preceded on costa by a small dark fuscous oblique mark, and on lower half by a wedge-shaped dark fuscous streak from inner margin; a transverse leaden-grey-metallic discal spot, lower extremity becoming obscurely whitish- ochreous; a small dark fuscous spot on costa above this; second line from 2/3 of costa to 3/4 of inner margin, very strongly curved outwards on upper 2/3, below this slightly sinuate, margined on costa with white wedge-shaped streaks, on lower half followed by a fainter similar line enclosing a white line; a yellow-ochreous space extending from discal spot to hindmargin, interrupting second line, cut by three parallel longitudinal leaden-grey-metallic purplish-tinged streaks, not reaching discal spot, upper alone reaching hindmargin; a white almost apical oblique mark from costa, separated from white margin of second line by a fuscous suffusion; space between lower half of second line and hindmargin, yellow-ochreous, suffusedly irrorated with dark fuscous; three black dots on hindmargin below middle, central subquadrate : cilia shining metallic bronzy-grey, with a strong black basal line. Hindwings grey; cilia whitish, with a grey basal line, and a faint cloudy grey median shade.

Gaskin stated that this species can be differentiated from G. bipunctella as G. harmonica has metallic markings on the subterminal costa of the forewing as well as silvery markings on the veins in the subterminal region.

== Distribution ==
G. harmonica is endemic to New Zealand. It is found both in the North and South Islands.

== Habitat and hosts ==
This species inhabits lowland to subalpine native forest. The larval host is unknown but is likely to be species of moss.

== Behaviour ==
Gaskin hypothesised that there were two broods per year. The adults of this species are on the wing from October until January.
