= Glaucocharis setacea =

Scientific classification
- Kingdom: Animalia
- Phylum: Arthropoda
- Clade: Pancrustacea
- Class: Insecta
- Order: Lepidoptera
- Family: Crambidae
- Subfamily: Crambinae
- Tribe: Diptychophorini
- Genus: Glaucocharis
- Species: G. setacea

Binomial name
- Glaucocharis setacea Chen, Song & Yuan, 2003

Species of moth

Glaucocharis setacea is a moth in the family Crambidae. It was described by Tie-Mei Chen, Shi-Mei Song and De-Cheng Yuan in 2003. It is found in Hubei, China.
