= Glaucocharis grandispinata =

Scientific classification
- Kingdom: Animalia
- Phylum: Arthropoda
- Clade: Pancrustacea
- Class: Insecta
- Order: Lepidoptera
- Family: Crambidae
- Subfamily: Crambinae
- Tribe: Diptychophorini
- Genus: Glaucocharis
- Species: G. grandispinata

Binomial name
- Glaucocharis grandispinata W.-C. Li & H.-H. Li, 2012

Species of moth

Glaucocharis grandispinata is a moth in the family Crambidae. It was described by Wei-Chun Li and Hou-Hun Li in 2012. It is found in Yunnan, China.
