= Glaucocharis melistoma =

Scientific classification
- Kingdom: Animalia
- Phylum: Arthropoda
- Clade: Pancrustacea
- Class: Insecta
- Order: Lepidoptera
- Family: Crambidae
- Subfamily: Crambinae
- Tribe: Diptychophorini
- Genus: Glaucocharis
- Species: G. melistoma

Binomial name
- Glaucocharis melistoma (Meyrick, 1931)

Synonyms
- Diptychophora melistoma Meyrick, 1931

Species of moth

Glaucocharis melistoma is a moth in the family Crambidae. It was described by Edward Meyrick in 1931. It is found in Sichuan, China.
