= Glaucocharis natalensis =

Scientific classification
- Kingdom: Animalia
- Phylum: Arthropoda
- Clade: Pancrustacea
- Class: Insecta
- Order: Lepidoptera
- Family: Crambidae
- Subfamily: Crambinae
- Tribe: Diptychophorini
- Genus: Glaucocharis
- Species: G. natalensis

Binomial name
- Glaucocharis natalensis (Hampson, 1919)

Synonyms
- Diptychophora natalensis Hampson, 1919

Species of moth

Glaucocharis natalensis is a moth in the family Crambidae. It was described by George Hampson in 1919. It is found in South Africa, where it has been recorded from KwaZulu-Natal.
