= Glaucocharis moriokensis =

Scientific classification
- Kingdom: Animalia
- Phylum: Arthropoda
- Clade: Pancrustacea
- Class: Insecta
- Order: Lepidoptera
- Family: Crambidae
- Subfamily: Crambinae
- Tribe: Diptychophorini
- Genus: Glaucocharis
- Species: G. moriokensis

Binomial name
- Glaucocharis moriokensis (Okano, 1962)

Synonyms
- Diptychophora moriokensis Okano, 1962

Species of moth

Glaucocharis moriokensis is a moth in the family Crambidae. It was described by Okano in 1962. It is found in Japan (Honshu).
