= Glaucocharis sericophthalma =

Scientific classification
- Kingdom: Animalia
- Phylum: Arthropoda
- Clade: Pancrustacea
- Class: Insecta
- Order: Lepidoptera
- Family: Crambidae
- Subfamily: Crambinae
- Tribe: Diptychophorini
- Genus: Glaucocharis
- Species: G. sericophthalma

Binomial name
- Glaucocharis sericophthalma (Meyrick, 1933)

Synonyms
- Diptychophora sericophthalma Meyrick, 1933

Species of moth

Glaucocharis sericophthalma is a moth in the family Crambidae. It was described by Edward Meyrick in 1933. It is found in Fiji.
