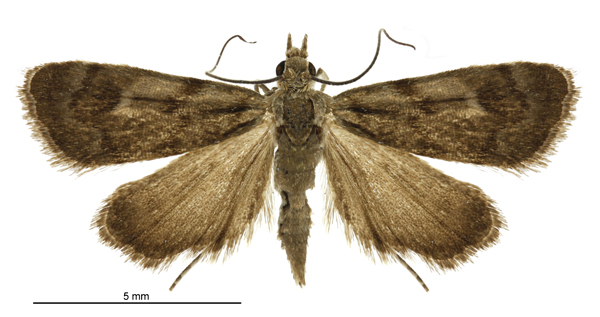
- Glaucocharis stella

Scientific classification
- Domain: Eukaryota
- Kingdom: Animalia
- Phylum: Arthropoda
- Class: Insecta
- Order: Lepidoptera
- Family: Crambidae
- Tribe: Diptychophorini
- Genus: Glaucocharis; Meyrick, 1938

Synonyms
- Ditomoptera Hampson, 1893; Pagmania Amsel, 1961; Pareromene Osthelder, 1941

= Glaucocharis =

Genus of moths

Glaucocharis is a genus of moths of the family Crambidae first described by Edward Meyrick in 1938. The type species for this genus is Glaucocharis stella.

== Species ==
- Glaucocharis aeolocnemis (Meyrick, 1931)
- Glaucocharis ajaxella (Bleszynski, 1966)
- Glaucocharis alatella Wang & Sung in Wang, Gaskin & Sung, 1988
- Glaucocharis albilinealis (Hampson, 1896)
- Glaucocharis alypophanes (Turner, 1904)
- Glaucocharis amydra (Tams, 1935)
- Glaucocharis apicudentella Song & Chen in Chen, Song & Yuan, 2001
- Glaucocharis assamensis Gaskin in Wang, Gaskin & Sung, 1988
- Glaucocharis auriscriptella (Walker, 1864)
- Glaucocharis baculella Wang & Sung in Wang, Gaskin & Sung, 1988
- Glaucocharis bathrogramma Meyrick, 1933
- Glaucocharis batianensis (Gaskin, 1974)
- Glaucocharis biconvexa W. Li & H. Li, 2012
- Glaucocharis bifidella Wang & Sung in Wang, Gaskin & Sung, 1988
- Glaucocharis bilinealis (Amsel, 1961)
- Glaucocharis bipunctella (Walker, 1866)
- Glaucocharis brandti Gaskin, 1985
- Glaucocharis brevis W. Li & H. Li, 2012
- Glaucocharis burmanella Gaskin in Wang, Gaskin & Sung, 1988
- Glaucocharis castaneus Chen, Song, Yuan & Zhang, 2004
- Glaucocharis celebesensis (Gaskin, 1974)
- Glaucocharis cheesmani (Gaskin, 1974)
- Glaucocharis chelatella Wang & Sung in Wang, Gaskin & Sung, 1988
- Glaucocharis chrysochyta (Meyrick, 1882)
- Glaucocharis clandestina Gaskin, 1985
- Glaucocharis classeyi Gaskin, 1985
- Glaucocharis clytia (Bleszynski, 1966)
- Glaucocharis comparella Gaskin, 1985
- Glaucocharis copernici (Bleszynski, 1965)
- Glaucocharis dialitha (Tams, 1935)
- Glaucocharis dilatella (Meyrick, 1879)
- Glaucocharis ediella Gaskin, 1985
- Glaucocharis eichhorni (Gaskin, 1974)
- Glaucocharis elaina (Meyrick, 1882)
- Glaucocharis electra (Bleszynski, 1965)
- Glaucocharis epiphaea (Meyrick, 1885)
- Glaucocharis equestris (Meyrick, 1931)
- Glaucocharis euchromiella (Ragonot, 1895)
- Glaucocharis exotica (Gaskin, 1974)
- Glaucocharis exsectella (Christoph, 1881)
- Glaucocharis fehrei Gaskin, 1985
- Glaucocharis fijiensis Gaskin, 1985
- Glaucocharis flavescens (Gaskin, 1974)
- Glaucocharis flavifasciaria W. Li & H. Li, 2012
- Glaucocharis forcipella Wang & Sung in Wang, Gaskin & Sung, 1988
- Glaucocharis furculella Wang & Sung in Wang, Gaskin & Sung, 1988
- Glaucocharis fusca (Gaskin, 1974)
- Glaucocharis fuscobasella (Snellen, 1900)
- Glaucocharis fuscopinna Gaskin in Wang, Gaskin & Sung, 1988
- Glaucocharis grandispinata W. Li & H. Li, 2012
- Glaucocharis griseolalis (Hampson, 1896)
- Glaucocharis hagenella Gaskin, 1985
- Glaucocharis harmonica (Meyrick, 1888)
- Glaucocharis hastatella Song & Chen in Chen, Song & Yuan, 2001
- Glaucocharis helioctypa (Meyrick, 1882)
- Glaucocharis himalayana Gaskin in Wang, Gaskin & Sung, 1988
- Glaucocharis hobbyi (Gaskin, 1974)
- Glaucocharis holanthes (Meyrick, 1885)
- Glaucocharis huanggangensis Song & Chen in Chen, Song & Yuan, 2001
- Glaucocharis incisella (Bleszynski, 1970)
- Glaucocharis infundella Wang & Sung in Wang, Gaskin & Sung, 1988
- Glaucocharis interruptus (C. Felder, R. Felder & Rogenhofer, 1875)
- Glaucocharis javaensis (Gaskin, 1974)
- Glaucocharis kangraensis Gaskin in Wang, Gaskin & Sung, 1988
- Glaucocharis khasiella Gaskin in Wang, Gaskin & Sung, 1988
- Glaucocharis lasiotella Song & Chen in Chen, Song & Yuan, 2001
- Glaucocharis lathonia (Bleszynski, 1966)
- Glaucocharis lepidella (Walker, 1866)
- Glaucocharis leucoxantha (Meyrick, 1882)
- Glaucocharis longqiensis Song, 1993
- Glaucocharis lunatella Wang & Sung in Wang, Gaskin & Sung, 1988
- Glaucocharis maculosa Bassi & Mey in Mey, 2011
- Glaucocharis margretella Gaskin, 1985
- Glaucocharis melistoma (Meyrick, 1931)
- Glaucocharis melli (Caradja in Caradja & Meyrick, 1933)
- Glaucocharis metallifera (Butler, 1877)
- Glaucocharis microdora (Meyrick, 1905)
- Glaucocharis microxantha (Meyrick, 1897)
- Glaucocharis minutalis (Hampson, 1893)
- Glaucocharis molleri Gaskin in Wang, Gaskin & Sung, 1988
- Glaucocharis molydocrossa (Turner, 1904)
- Glaucocharis moriokensis (Okano, 1962)
- Glaucocharis morobella (Bleszynski, 1966)
- Glaucocharis muscela (Fryer, 1912)
- Glaucocharis mutuurella (Bleszynski, 1965)
- Glaucocharis natalensis (Hampson, 1919)
- Glaucocharis neotafanella Gaskin, 1985
- Glaucocharis novaehebridensis (Gaskin, 1974)
- Glaucocharis ochracealis (Walker, 1866)
- Glaucocharis ochronella Wang & Sung in Wang, Gaskin & Sung, 1988
- Glaucocharis ochrophanes (Meyrick, 1931)
- Glaucocharis octacornutella Wang & Sung in Wang, Gaskin & Sung, 1988
- Glaucocharis omeishani (Bleszynski, 1965)
- Glaucocharis palidella Wang & Sung in Wang, Gaskin & Sung, 1988
- Glaucocharis papuanensis Gaskin, 1985
- Glaucocharis paradisella (Bleszynski, 1966)
- Glaucocharis parmulella Wang & Sung in Wang, Gaskin & Sung, 1988
- Glaucocharis parorma (Meyrick, 1924)
- Glaucocharis parthenie (Bleszynski, 1965)
- Glaucocharis parviexectella Sasaki, 2007
- Glaucocharis pauli Gaskin, 1985
- Glaucocharis paulispinata W. Li & H. Li, 2012
- Glaucocharis penetrata (Meyrick, 1933)
- Glaucocharis pilcheri Gaskin in Wang, Gaskin & Sung, 1988
- Glaucocharis planetopa (Meyrick, 1923)
- Glaucocharis pogonias (Turner, 1911)
- Glaucocharis pomae Wang & Sung in Wang, Gaskin & Sung, 1988
- Glaucocharis praemialis (Meyrick, 1931)
- Glaucocharis preangerella (Gaskin, 1974)
- Glaucocharis propepraemialis (Gaskin, 1974)
- Glaucocharis pyrsophanes (Meyrick, 1882)
- Glaucocharis quadratella Song & Chen in Chen, Song & Yuan, 2001
- Glaucocharis queenslandensis (Gaskin, 1975)
- Glaucocharis qujingella Wang & Sung in Wang, Gaskin & Sung, 1988
- Glaucocharis ramona (Bleszynski, 1965)
- Glaucocharis rectifascialis Gaskin in Wang, Gaskin & Sung, 1988
- Glaucocharis reniella Wang & Sung in Wang, Gaskin & Sung, 1988
- Glaucocharis rhamphella Wang & Sung in Wang, Gaskin & Sung, 1988
- Glaucocharis robinsoni Gaskin, 1985
- Glaucocharis rosanna (Bleszynski, 1965)
- Glaucocharis rosannoides (Bleszynski, 1965)
- Glaucocharis rossi Gaskin, 1985
- Glaucocharis rothschildi Gaskin, 1985
- Glaucocharis rusticula (Meyrick, 1931)
- Glaucocharis scrotiformis W. Li & H. Li, 2012
- Glaucocharis selenaea (Meyrick, 1885)
- Glaucocharis senekai (Ganev, 1987)
- Glaucocharis sericophthalma (Meyrick, 1933)
- Glaucocharis setacea Chen, Song & Yuan, 2003
- Glaucocharis setosa W. Li & H. Li, 2012
- Glaucocharis siciformis W. Li & H. Li, 2012
- Glaucocharis sikkimella Gaskin in Wang, Gaskin & Sung, 1988
- Glaucocharis simmondsi (Gaskin, 1974)
- Glaucocharis spiculella Wang & Sung in Wang, Gaskin & Sung, 1988
- Glaucocharis spinulella Wang & Sung in Wang, Gaskin & Sung, 1988
- Glaucocharis stella Meyrick, 1938
- Glaucocharis stenura (Turner, 1904)
- Glaucocharis subalbilinealis (Bleszynski, 1965)
- Glaucocharis subnatalensis (Bleszynski, 1970)
- Glaucocharis sumatraensis (Gaskin, 1974)
- Glaucocharis swanni Gaskin in Wang, Gaskin & Sung, 1988
- Glaucocharis taeniata Wang & Sung in Wang, Gaskin & Sung, 1988
- Glaucocharis tafanella Gaskin, 1985
- Glaucocharis taphrophracta (Meyrick, 1934)
- Glaucocharis tibetensis Wang & Sung, 1983
- Glaucocharis torva (T. P. Lucas, 1898)
- Glaucocharis tridentata W. Li & H. Li, 2012
- Glaucocharis tripunctata (Moore, 1888)
- Glaucocharis tyriochrysa (Meyrick, 1933)
- Glaucocharis unipunctalis Sasaki, 2007
- Glaucocharis utsugii Sasaki, 2007
- Glaucocharis vermeeri (Bleszynski, 1965)
- Glaucocharis xanthogramma (Meyrick, 1931)
