= Glaucocharis torva =

Scientific classification
- Kingdom: Animalia
- Phylum: Arthropoda
- Clade: Pancrustacea
- Class: Insecta
- Order: Lepidoptera
- Family: Crambidae
- Subfamily: Crambinae
- Tribe: Diptychophorini
- Genus: Glaucocharis
- Species: G. torva

Binomial name
- Glaucocharis torva (T. P. Lucas, 1898)

Synonyms
- Diptychophora torva T. P. Lucas, 1898; Diptychophora dialeuca Turner, 1904; Diptychophora leucogramma Turner, 1913

Species of moth

Glaucocharis torva is a moth in the family Crambidae. It was described by Thomas Pennington Lucas in 1898. It is found in Australia.
