= Glaucocharis minutalis =

Scientific classification
- Kingdom: Animalia
- Phylum: Arthropoda
- Clade: Pancrustacea
- Class: Insecta
- Order: Lepidoptera
- Family: Crambidae
- Subfamily: Crambinae
- Tribe: Diptychophorini
- Genus: Glaucocharis
- Species: G. minutalis

Binomial name
- Glaucocharis minutalis (Hampson, 1893)

Synonyms
- Ditomoptera minutalis Hampson, 1893; Diptychophora minutella Hampson, 1896

Species of moth

Glaucocharis minutalis is a moth in the family Crambidae. It was described by George Hampson in 1893. It is found in Sri Lanka.

Adult males are ochreous, the forewings wholly suffused with brown, except the apex, which bears a white longitudinal streak. The subbasal and antemedial lines are very indistinct and dark and there is an indistinct line from the lower angle of the cell, curving up to the costa, then descending to near the outer angle and forming a mark. There is also a dark marginal line. The hindwings are pale fuscous, with the marginal line as on the forewings. The females have scarcely any brown suffusion on the forewings and the markings are more distinct. The hindwings are paler.
