= Glaucocharis taphrophracta =

Scientific classification
- Kingdom: Animalia
- Phylum: Arthropoda
- Clade: Pancrustacea
- Class: Insecta
- Order: Lepidoptera
- Family: Crambidae
- Subfamily: Crambinae
- Tribe: Diptychophorini
- Genus: Glaucocharis
- Species: G. taphrophracta

Binomial name
- Glaucocharis taphrophracta (Meyrick, 1934)

Synonyms
- Diptychophora taphrophracta Meyrick, 1934; Diptychophora taphorphracta Hua, 2005

Species of moth

Glaucocharis taphrophracta is a moth in the family Crambidae. It was described by Edward Meyrick in 1934. It is found in Sichuan, China.
