= Glaucocharis longqiensis =

Scientific classification
- Kingdom: Animalia
- Phylum: Arthropoda
- Clade: Pancrustacea
- Class: Insecta
- Order: Lepidoptera
- Family: Crambidae
- Subfamily: Crambinae
- Tribe: Diptychophorini
- Genus: Glaucocharis
- Species: G. longqiensis

Binomial name
- Glaucocharis longqiensis Song, 1993

Species of moth

Glaucocharis longqiensis is a moth in the family Crambidae. It was described by Shi-Mei Song in 1993. It is found in Fujian, China.
