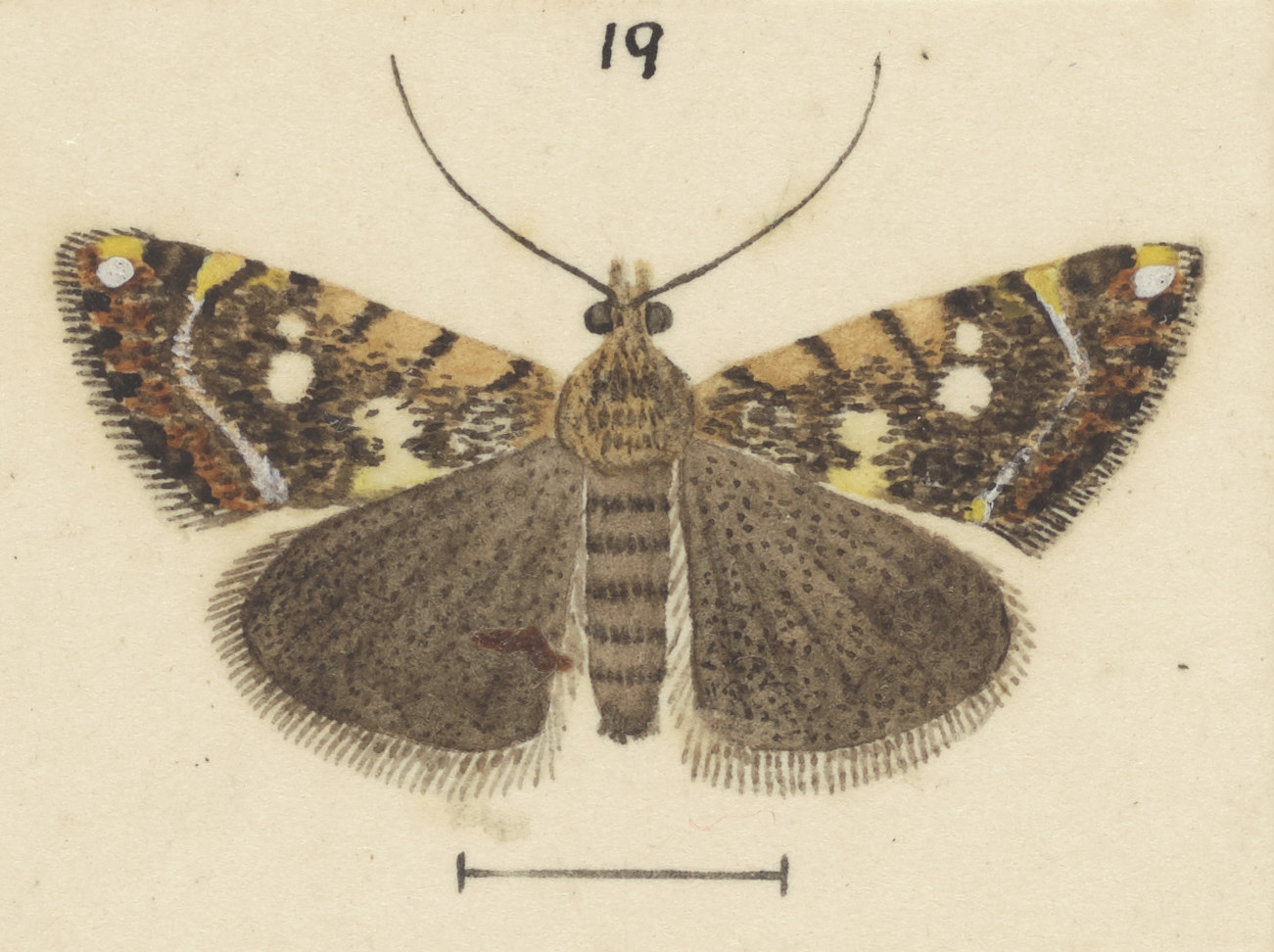

Scientific classification
- Kingdom: Animalia
- Phylum: Arthropoda
- Clade: Pancrustacea
- Class: Insecta
- Order: Lepidoptera
- Family: Crambidae
- Subfamily: Crambinae
- Tribe: Diptychophorini
- Genus: Glaucocharis
- Species: G. planetopa

Binomial name
- Glaucocharis planetopa (Meyrick, 1923)

Synonyms
- Diptychophora planetopa Meyrick, 1923; Pareromene planetopa (Meyrick, 1923)

= Glaucocharis planetopa =

Species of moth endemic to New Zealand

Glaucocharis planetopa is a moth of the family Crambidae. It was first described by Edward Meyrick in 1923. It is endemic to New Zealand and has only been observed on the South Island. G. planetopa inhabits native forest. Larvae of Glaucocharis species feed on mosses and liverworts. Adults are on the wing in January and February. As at 1971 the female of this species had yet to be collected.

== Taxonomy ==
This species was first described by Edward Meyrick using a specimen from the Otago Lakes region in forest collected by George Hudson and named Diptychophora planetopa. George Hudson discussed and illustrated this species under that name in his 1928 book The butterflies and moths of New Zealand. In 1971 David Edward Gaskin placed this species in the genus Pareromene. However in 1985 Gaskin recognised that Glaucocharis must take precedence over Pareromene and placed G. planetopa into that genus. The female holotype specimen collected in the Routeburn Valley, at the head of Lake Wakatipu, is held at Natural History Museum, London.

== Description ==
Meyrick described this species as follows:

♂. 11 mm. Head whitish-ochreous mixed with grey. Palpi grey with ochreous-yellowish median spot, towards base whitish. Thorax dark grey, patagia pale ochreous with a dark-grey stripe. Abdomen rather dark grey. Forewings triangular, termen slightly bisinuate; dark fuscous, somewhat mixed with whitish-ochreous in disc; anterior half of costa suffused with whitish-ochreous; first line rather thick, irregular, whitishochreous on upper half and white on lower, edged with cloudy dark-fuscous lines, angulated outwards in middle and inwards towards dorsum, preceded by a fascia of whitish-ochreous suffusion marked with white below middle; a rather large round snow-white discal spot beyond middle, above which is a white dot; second line fine, white, interrupted into minute lunules, excurved from near costa to below middle; a white dot near apex; a terminal series of six rather cloudy black triangular spots, preceded by a series of irregular brownish-ochreous spots, at apex an elongate brownish-ochreous spot, a minute white mark beneath uppermost black spot: cilia dark grey, with fine indistinct whitish basal and median lines, and indistinct slender whitish bars beneath apex, in middle, and above tornus. Hindwings rather dark grey; cilia light grey with whitish median and apical shades.

Gaskin in 1971 stated that the female of this species had yet to be collected.

== Distribution ==
G. planetopa is endemic to New Zealand. This species is only found in the South Island, from its type locality, Arthur's PassArthur's Pass, above the Otira River, at about 3500 ft and Lakes Manapouri and Te Anau. Charles C. Clarke regarded this species as rare.

== Habitat and hosts ==
This species inhabits native forest. Larvae of Glaucocharis species feed on mosses and liverworts.

== Behaviour ==
Adults are on the wing in January and February.
