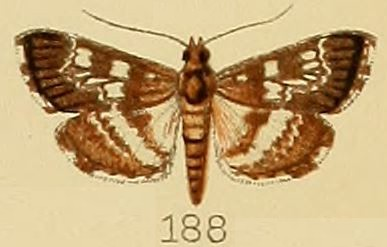
- Epipagis tristalis

Scientific classification
- Kingdom: Animalia
- Phylum: Arthropoda
- Class: Insecta
- Order: Lepidoptera
- Family: Crambidae
- Subfamily: Spilomelinae
- Genus: Epipagis; Hübner, 1825

Synonyms
- Epipages Hampson, 1918; Stenophyes Lederer, 1863

= Epipagis =

Genus of moths

Epipagis is a genus of moths of the family Crambidae described by Jacob Hübner in 1825.

== Species ==
- Epipagis algarrobolis (Schaus, 1940)
- Epipagis citrinalis (Hampson, 1899)
- Epipagis disparilis (Dyar, 1910)
- Epipagis fenestralis Hübner, 1796
- Epipagis flavispila (Hampson, 1913)
- Epipagis forsythae Munroe, 1955
- Epipagis lygialis (Snellen, 1899)
- Epipagis peritalis (Walker, 1859)
- Epipagis polythliptalis (Hampson, 1899)
- Epipagis quadriserialis (Pagenstecher, 1907)
- Epipagis roseocinctalis (Hampson, 1913)
- Epipagis setinalis Hampson, 1918
- Epipagis triserialis Pagenstecher, 1907
- Epipagis tristalis (Kenrick, 1907)
- Epipagis zinghalis (Walker, 1859)

== Former species ==
- Epipagis cancellalis (Zeller, 1852)
- Epipagis ocellata (Hampson in Poulton, 1916)
- Epipagis prolalis Viette & Legrand, 1958
- Epipagis strigiferalis (Hampson, 1900)
- Epipagis vespertinalis (Saalmüller, 1880)
