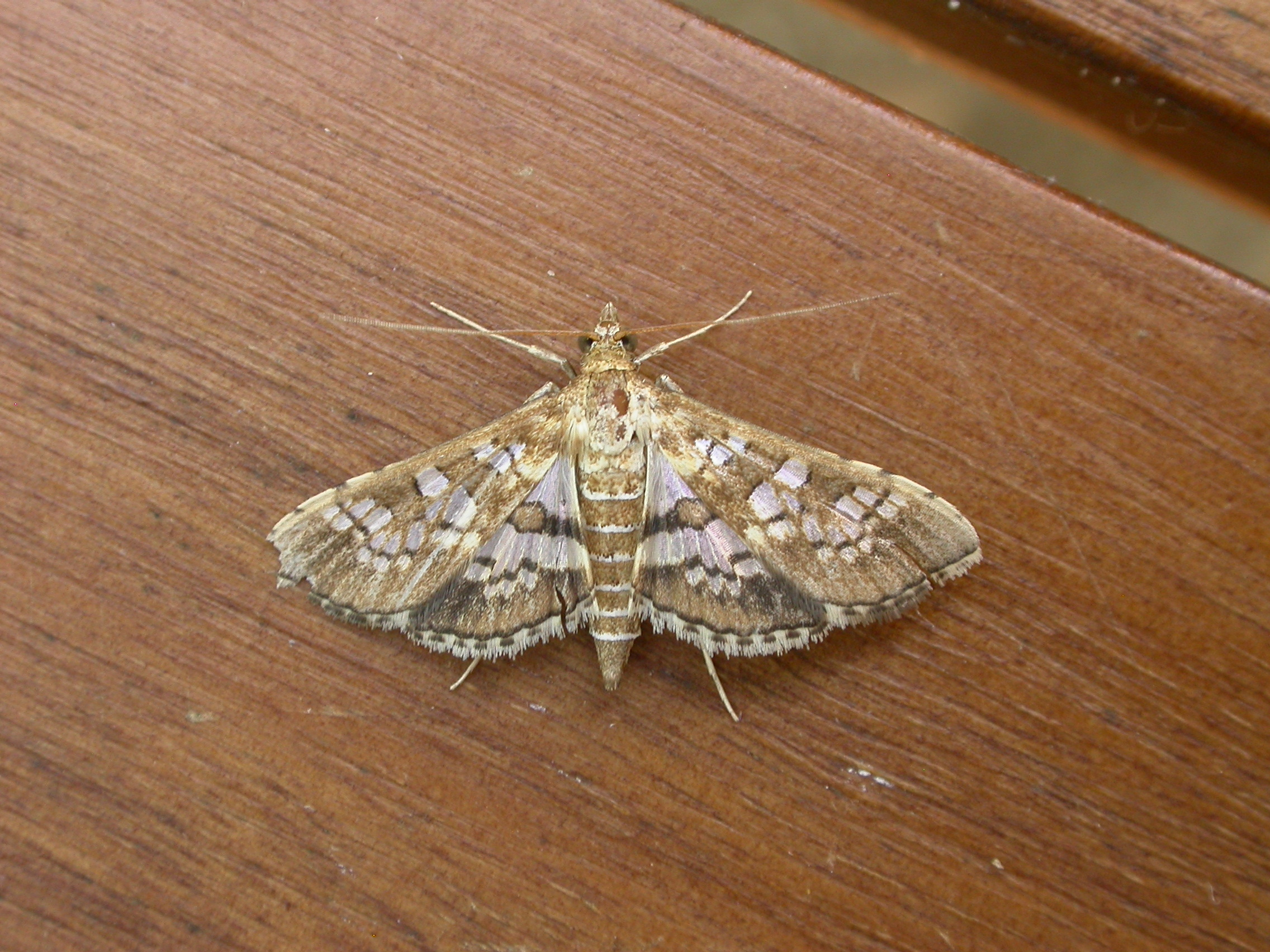
- Sameodes cancellalis

Scientific classification
- Kingdom: Animalia
- Phylum: Arthropoda
- Class: Insecta
- Order: Lepidoptera
- Family: Crambidae
- Genus: Sameodes; Snellen, 1880

= Sameodes =

Genus of moths

Sameodes is a genus of moths of the family Crambidae described by Snellen in 1880.

== Species ==
- Sameodes abstrusalis (Moore, 1888)
- Sameodes alexalis Schaus, 1927
- Sameodes cancellalis (Zeller, 1852)
- Sameodes distictalis Hampson, 1899
- Sameodes enderythralis Hampson, 1899
- Sameodes ennoduisalis Schaus, 1927
- Sameodes finbaralis Schaus, 1927
- Sameodes furvipicta Hampson, 1913
- Sameodes microspilalis Hampson, 1913
- Sameodes odulphalis Schaus, 1927
- Sameodes pictalis Swinhoe, 1895
- Sameodes polythiptalis Hampson, 1899
- Sameodes ulricalis Schaus, 1927

== Former species ==
- Sameodes iolealis (Walker, 1859)
- Sameodes tristalis Kenrick, 1907
