= Pessocosma peritalis =

Scientific classification
- Kingdom: Animalia
- Phylum: Arthropoda
- Class: Insecta
- Order: Lepidoptera
- Family: Crambidae
- Genus: Pessocosma
- Species: P. peritalis

Binomial name
- Pessocosma peritalis Hampson, 1899

Species of moth

Pessocosma peritalis is a moth in the family Crambidae. It was described by George Hampson in 1899. It is found in India and Sri Lanka.
