= Heortia plumbatalis =

Scientific classification
- Kingdom: Animalia
- Phylum: Arthropoda
- Clade: Pancrustacea
- Class: Insecta
- Order: Lepidoptera
- Family: Crambidae
- Genus: Heortia
- Species: H. plumbatalis

Binomial name
- Heortia plumbatalis (Zeller, 1852)

Synonyms
- Botys plumbatalis Zeller, 1852; Loxostege plumbatalis; Botys plumbofascialis Lederer, 1863; Scopula ferriscriptalis Walker, 1866

Species of moth

Heortia plumbatalis is a moth in the family Crambidae. It was described by Zeller in 1852. It is found in the Democratic Republic of Congo and South Africa.
