= Sameodes microspilalis =

Scientific classification
- Kingdom: Animalia
- Phylum: Arthropoda
- Class: Insecta
- Order: Lepidoptera
- Family: Crambidae
- Genus: Sameodes
- Species: S. microspilalis

Binomial name
- Sameodes microspilalis Hampson, 1913

Species of moth

Sameodes microspilalis is a moth in the family Crambidae. It is found in Zimbabwe.

The wingspan is about 22 mm. Adults are yellow-brown, the forewings with small hyaline spots defined by black, consisting of two obliquely placed antemedial spots in and the below cell, medial spots in and below the cell usually with a small elongate spot between them above the base of vein 2, as well as small spots beyond the cell above and below vein 6, with others rather nearer the termen above and below vein 7 and below veins 5 and 4. There are some slight black and whitish streaks on the costa towards the apex and a fine punctiform black terminal line. The hindwings are slightly tinged with fuscous towards the termen and have hyaline white markings defined by black. The base is white, with a black line on its outer edge and an oblique medial band from the subcostal nervure to vein 1. There is a spot beyond the cell defined by black on the inner side and a black postmedial line with a series of small white spots on its outer edge, as well as a black terminal line.
