= Sameodes distictalis =

Scientific classification
- Kingdom: Animalia
- Phylum: Arthropoda
- Class: Insecta
- Order: Lepidoptera
- Family: Crambidae
- Genus: Sameodes
- Species: S. distictalis

Binomial name
- Sameodes distictalis Hampson, 1899

Synonyms
- Epipagis distictalis

Species of moth

Sameodes distictalis is a moth in the family Crambidae. It is found in Indonesia (Pulo Laut).

The wingspan is about 18 mm.
