= Sameodes odulphalis =

Scientific classification
- Kingdom: Animalia
- Phylum: Arthropoda
- Class: Insecta
- Order: Lepidoptera
- Family: Crambidae
- Genus: Sameodes
- Species: S. odulphalis

Binomial name
- Sameodes odulphalis Schaus, 1927

Species of moth

Sameodes odulphalis is a moth in the family Crambidae. It is found in the Philippines (Luzon).

The wingspan is about 26 mm. The wings are pale orange yellow, the forewings with a small black spot at the base of the cell and a slightly larger spot covering the base of veins 3 and 4. The hindwings have a silvery white inner margin.
