= Pessocosma bistigmalis =

Scientific classification
- Kingdom: Animalia
- Phylum: Arthropoda
- Class: Insecta
- Order: Lepidoptera
- Family: Crambidae
- Genus: Pessocosma
- Species: P. bistigmalis

Binomial name
- Pessocosma bistigmalis (Pryer, 1877)

Synonyms
- Sameodes bistigmalis Pryer, 1877

Species of moth

Pessocosma bistigmalis is a moth in the family Crambidae. It was described by Pryer in 1877. It is found in China.
