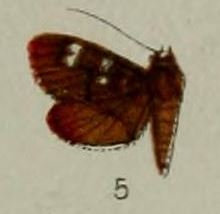

Scientific classification
- Kingdom: Animalia
- Phylum: Arthropoda
- Class: Insecta
- Order: Lepidoptera
- Family: Crambidae
- Genus: Tabidia
- Species: T. truncatalis

Binomial name
- Tabidia truncatalis Hampson, 1899

= Tabidia truncatalis =

Species of moth

Tabidia truncatalis is a moth in the family Crambidae. It was described by George Hampson in 1899. It is found in Australia and New Guinea.
