= Epipagis quadriserialis =

Scientific classification
- Kingdom: Animalia
- Phylum: Arthropoda
- Class: Insecta
- Order: Lepidoptera
- Family: Crambidae
- Genus: Epipagis
- Species: E. quadriserialis

Binomial name
- Epipagis quadriserialis (Pagenstecher, 1907)

Synonyms
- Sameodes quadriserialis Pagenstecher, 1907

Species of moth

Epipagis quadriserialis is a moth in the family Crambidae. It is found in Madagascar.
