= Sameodes abstrusalis =

Scientific classification
- Kingdom: Animalia
- Phylum: Arthropoda
- Class: Insecta
- Order: Lepidoptera
- Family: Crambidae
- Genus: Sameodes
- Species: S. abstrusalis

Binomial name
- Sameodes abstrusalis (Moore, 1888)

Synonyms
- Aediodes abstrusalis Moore, 1888

Species of moth

Sameodes abstrusalis is a moth in the family Crambidae. It is found in India and Japan.
