= Sameodes ulricalis =

Scientific classification
- Kingdom: Animalia
- Phylum: Arthropoda
- Class: Insecta
- Order: Lepidoptera
- Family: Crambidae
- Genus: Sameodes
- Species: S. ulricalis

Binomial name
- Sameodes ulricalis Schaus, 1927

Species of moth

Sameodes ulricalis is a moth in the family Crambidae. It is found in the Philippines (Luzon).

The wingspan is about 25 mm. The forewings are pinkish buff, with dark vinaceous drab markings. There is an interrupted streak on the base of the costa and a thick, slightly curved antemedial line, followed by an elongated spot to below the large round discocellular spot. The postmedial is broad from below the costa and well outcurved close to the discocellular spot, its inner edge diffuse below vein 3. The hindwings are semihyaline white, suffused with light buff.
