= Tabidia obvia =

Scientific classification
- Domain: Eukaryota
- Kingdom: Animalia
- Phylum: Arthropoda
- Class: Insecta
- Order: Lepidoptera
- Family: Crambidae
- Genus: Tabidia
- Species: T. obvia

Binomial name
- Tabidia obvia Du & Li, 2014

Species of moth

Tabidia obvia is a moth in the family Crambidae. It was first described by Xi-Cui Du and Hou-Hun Li in 2014. It is found in China in Gansu, Hubei, Chongqing, Sichuan, Guizhou, Zhejiang and Guangdong.

The wingspan is 18–22 mm.
