= Epipagis flavispila =

Scientific classification
- Kingdom: Animalia
- Phylum: Arthropoda
- Class: Insecta
- Order: Lepidoptera
- Family: Crambidae
- Genus: Epipagis
- Species: E. flavispila

Binomial name
- Epipagis flavispila (Hampson, 1913)

Synonyms
- Sameodes flavispila Hampson, 1913

Species of moth

Epipagis flavispila is a moth in the family Crambidae. It is found in Nigeria.
