= Sameodes enderythralis =

Scientific classification
- Kingdom: Animalia
- Phylum: Arthropoda
- Class: Insecta
- Order: Lepidoptera
- Family: Crambidae
- Genus: Sameodes
- Species: S. enderythralis

Binomial name
- Sameodes enderythralis Hampson, 1899

Synonyms
- Epipagis enderythralis

Species of moth

Sameodes enderythralis is a moth in the family Crambidae. It is found in India (Sikkim).

The wingspan is about 15 mm. Adults are dull brown, the forewings with an orange basal area below the cell and patches of red scales. There are traces of antemedial and medial lines on the inner area and there is a hyaline discal spot and a postmedial orange wedge-shaped patch from the costa to vein 5. The basal area of the hindwings is orange, with diffused sinuous subbasal and antemedial bands. The terminal half is brown with some red on the inner edge.
