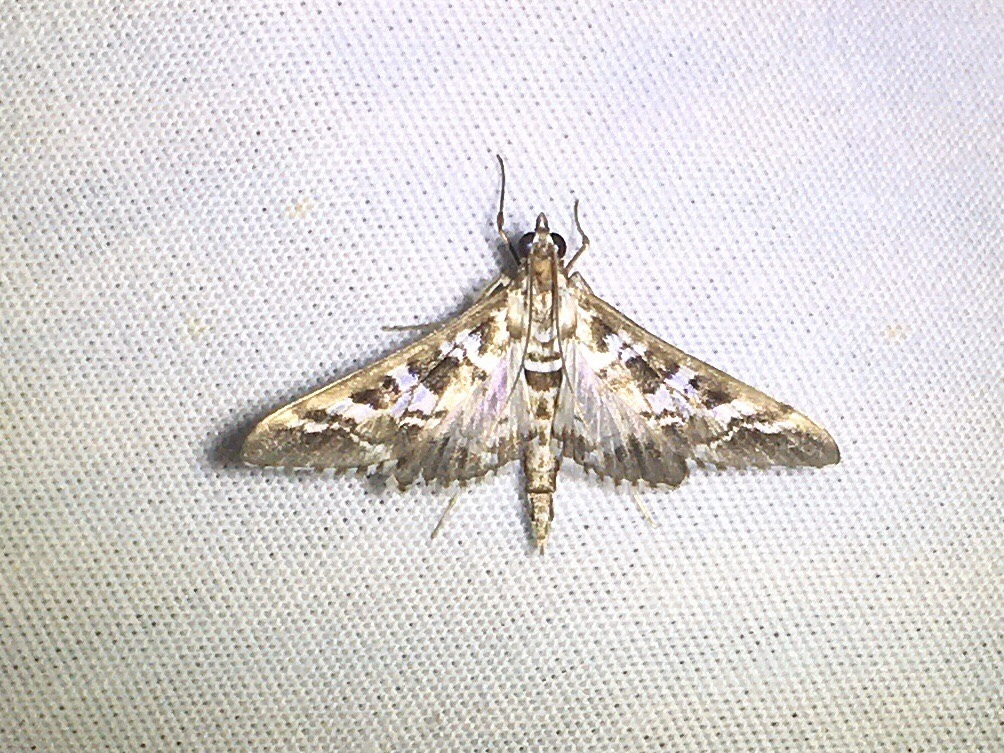

Scientific classification
- Kingdom: Animalia
- Phylum: Arthropoda
- Class: Insecta
- Order: Lepidoptera
- Family: Crambidae
- Genus: Epipagis
- Species: E. forsythae

Binomial name
- Epipagis forsythae Munroe, 1955

= Epipagis forsythae =

Species of moth

Epipagis forsythae, or Forsyth's epipagis moth, is a moth in the family Crambidae. It was described by Eugene G. Munroe in 1955. It is found in North America, where it has been recorded from Florida.
