= Heortia dominalis =

Scientific classification
- Kingdom: Animalia
- Phylum: Arthropoda
- Clade: Pancrustacea
- Class: Insecta
- Order: Lepidoptera
- Family: Crambidae
- Genus: Heortia
- Species: H. dominalis

Binomial name
- Heortia dominalis Lederer, 1863

Synonyms
- Eteta sexfasciata Walker, 1865; Vitessa triplaga Walker, 1869

Species of moth

Heortia dominalis is a moth in the family Crambidae. It was described by Julius Lederer in 1863. It is found in Papua New Guinea, the Philippines and on Ternate and Seram.

The wings are purplish black with ochreous basal patch and two large yellow spots.

== Subspecies ==
- Heortia dominalis dominalis
- Heortia dominalis restricta Munroe, 1977 (Papua New Guinea)
