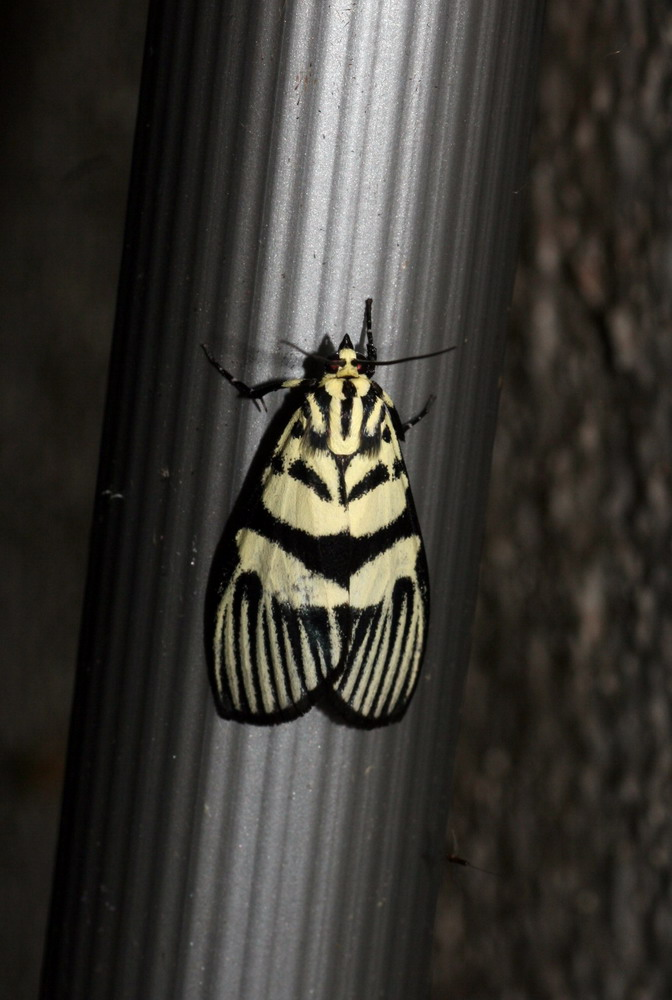

Scientific classification
- Kingdom: Animalia
- Phylum: Arthropoda
- Clade: Pancrustacea
- Class: Insecta
- Order: Lepidoptera
- Family: Crambidae
- Subfamily: Odontiinae
- Genus: Heortia; Lederer, 1863

Synonyms
- Eteta Walker, 1865; Tyspana Moore, 1885

= Heortia =

Genus of moths

Heortia is a genus of moths of the family Crambidae.

== Species ==
- Heortia dominalis Lederer, 1863
- Heortia iospora (Meyrick, 1936)
- Heortia iridia Munroe, 1977
- Heortia ocellata (Hampson in Poulton, 1916)
- Heortia plumbatalis (Zeller, 1852)
- Heortia polyplagalis Hampson, 1913
- Heortia vitessoides (Moore, 1885)
