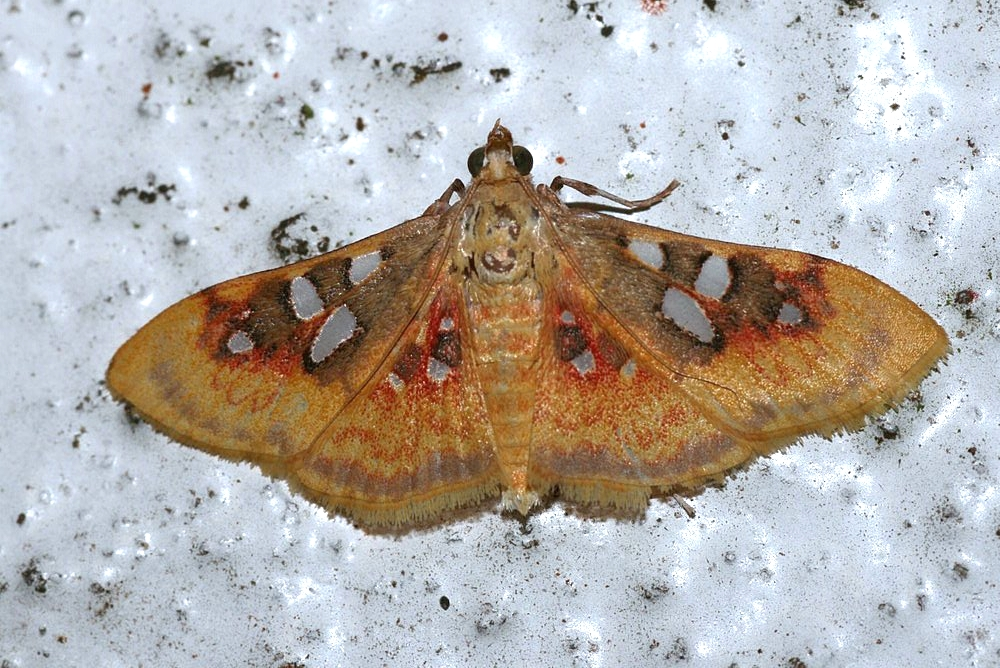
- Epipagis pictalis

Scientific classification
- Kingdom: Animalia
- Phylum: Arthropoda
- Class: Insecta
- Order: Lepidoptera
- Family: Crambidae
- Genus: Sameodes
- Species: S. pictalis

Binomial name
- Sameodes pictalis C. Swinhoe, 1895

= Sameodes pictalis =

Species of moth

Sameodes pictalis is a moth in the family Crambidae first described by Charles Swinhoe in 1895. It is found in Assam, India.
