= Epipagis disparilis =

Scientific classification
- Kingdom: Animalia
- Phylum: Arthropoda
- Class: Insecta
- Order: Lepidoptera
- Family: Crambidae
- Genus: Epipagis
- Species: E. disparilis

Binomial name
- Epipagis disparilis (Dyar, 1910)

Synonyms
- Stenophyes disparilis Dyar, 1910

Species of moth

Epipagis disparilis is a moth in the family Crambidae. It is found in Mexico and Arizona.
