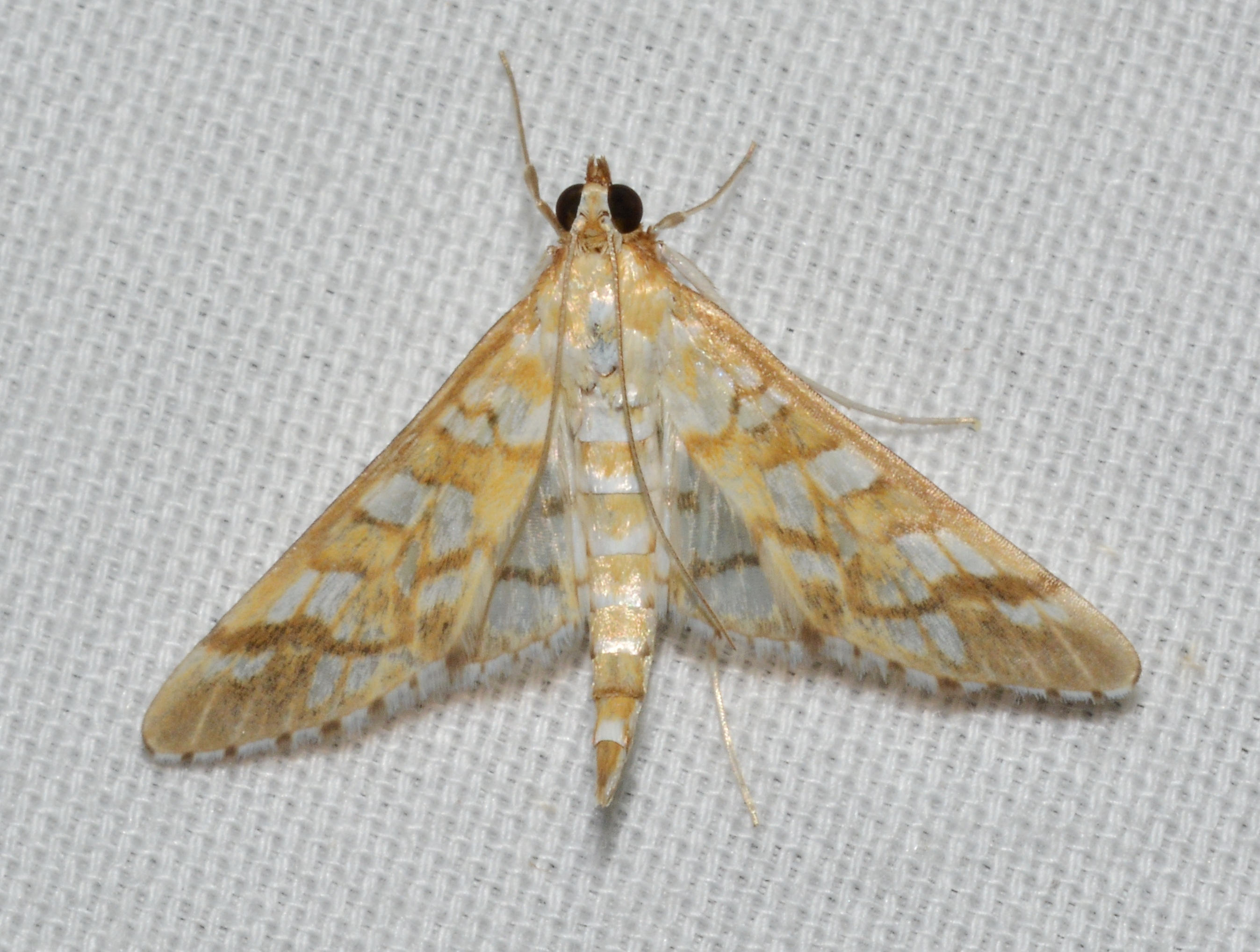
- Top view
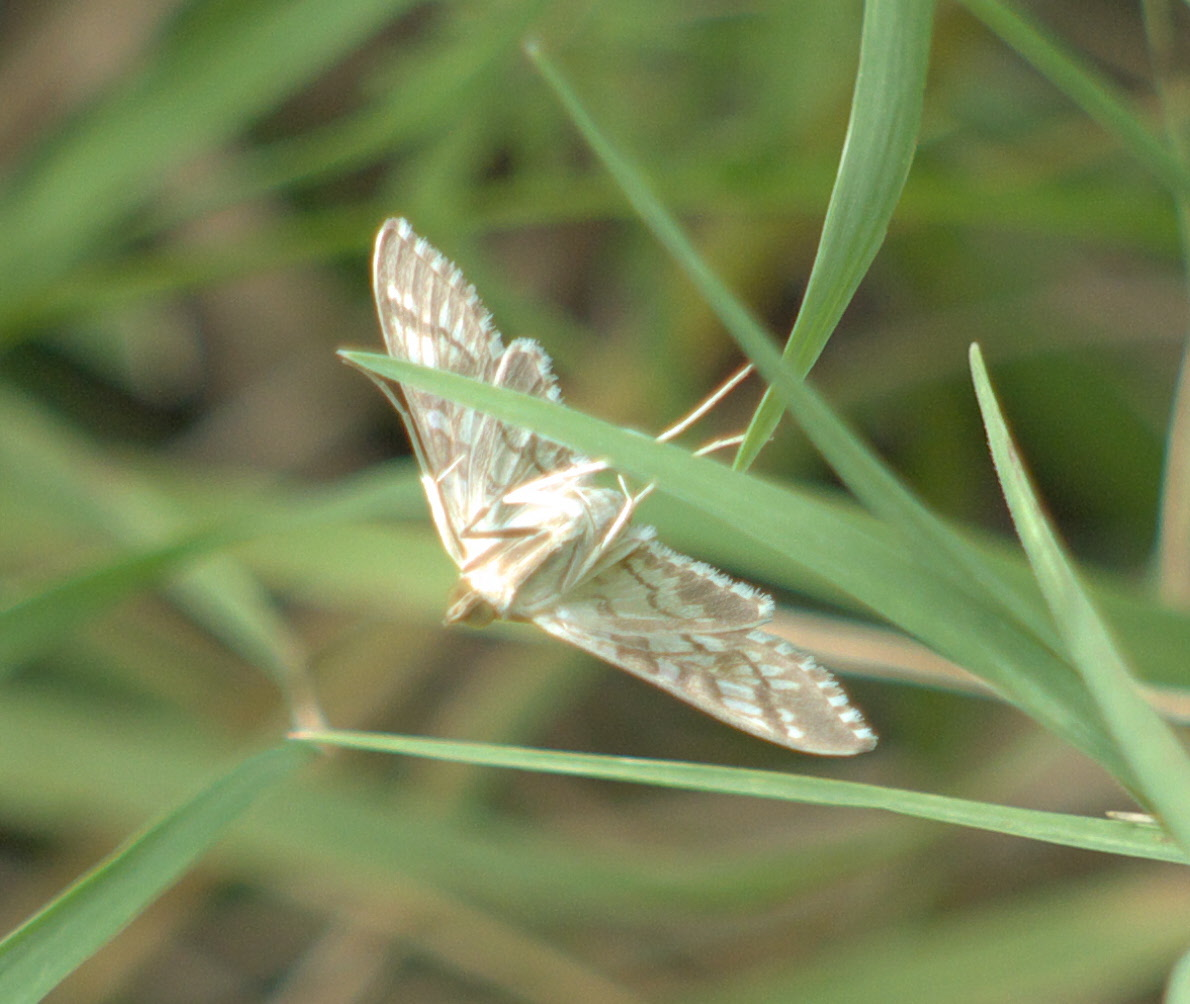
- Bottom view

Scientific classification
- Kingdom: Animalia
- Phylum: Arthropoda
- Clade: Pancrustacea
- Class: Insecta
- Order: Lepidoptera
- Family: Crambidae
- Genus: Epipagis
- Species: E. fenestralis

Binomial name
- Epipagis fenestralis (Hübner, 1796)

Synonyms
- Pyralis fenestralis Hübner, 1796; Phalangiodes serinalis Walker, 1859; Samea huronalis Guenée, 1854

= Epipagis fenestralis =

Species of moth

Epipagis fenestralis is a moth in the family Crambidae. It is found in North America, where it has been recorded from North Carolina and Kentucky to Florida, the Gulf States, Arkansas and Texas. It is also found in Costa Rica.

The wingspan is 20–25 mm.
