= Epipagis algarrobolis =

Scientific classification
- Kingdom: Animalia
- Phylum: Arthropoda
- Class: Insecta
- Order: Lepidoptera
- Family: Crambidae
- Genus: Epipagis
- Species: E. algarrobolis

Binomial name
- Epipagis algarrobolis (Schaus, 1940)

Synonyms
- Crocidophora algarrobolis Schaus, 1940

Species of moth

Epipagis algarrobolis is a moth in the family Crambidae. It is found in Puerto Rico.
