= Pessocosma =

Scientific classification
- Kingdom: Animalia
- Phylum: Arthropoda
- Class: Insecta
- Order: Lepidoptera
- Family: Crambidae
- Subfamily: Spilomelinae
- Genus: Pessocosma; Meyrick, 1884

Genus of moths

Pessocosma is a genus of moths of the family Crambidae.

== Species ==
- Pessocosma bistigmalis (Pryer, 1877)
- Pessocosma iolealis (Walker, 1859)
- Pessocosma peritalis Hampson, 1899
- Pessocosma prolalis (Viette & Legrand in Viette, 1958)
