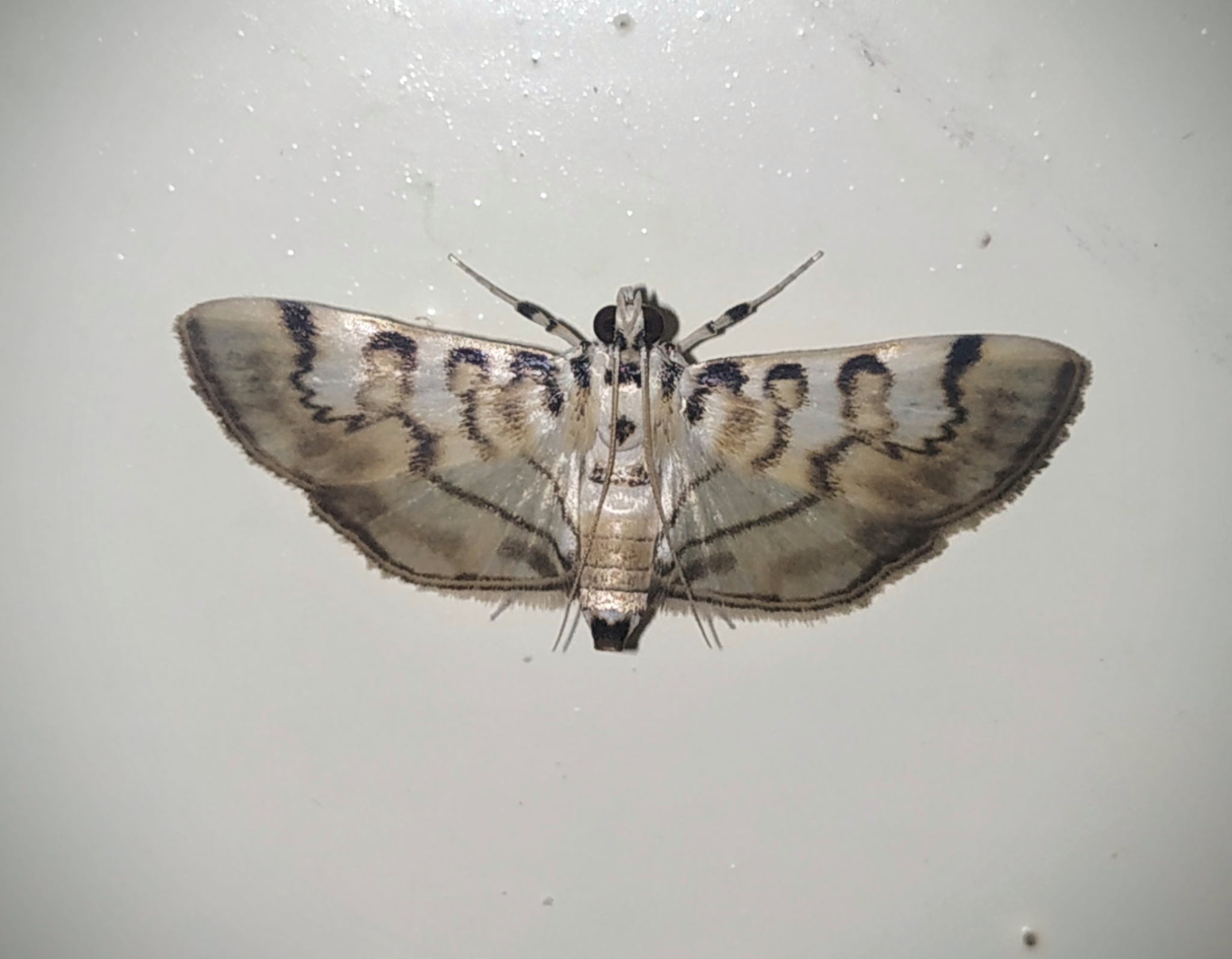

Scientific classification
- Kingdom: Animalia
- Phylum: Arthropoda
- Class: Insecta
- Order: Lepidoptera
- Family: Crambidae
- Genus: Tabidia
- Species: T. aculealis

Binomial name
- Tabidia aculealis (Walker, 1866)

Synonyms
- Botys aculealis Walker, 1866

= Tabidia aculealis =

Species of moth

Tabidia aculealis is a moth in the family Crambidae. It was described by Francis Walker in 1866. It is found in Indonesia (Sula Islands, Java) and Sri Lanka.

The larvae feed on the leaves of sweet potato (Ipomoea batatas). They feed on the mesophyll from the inner side of the rolled leaf.
