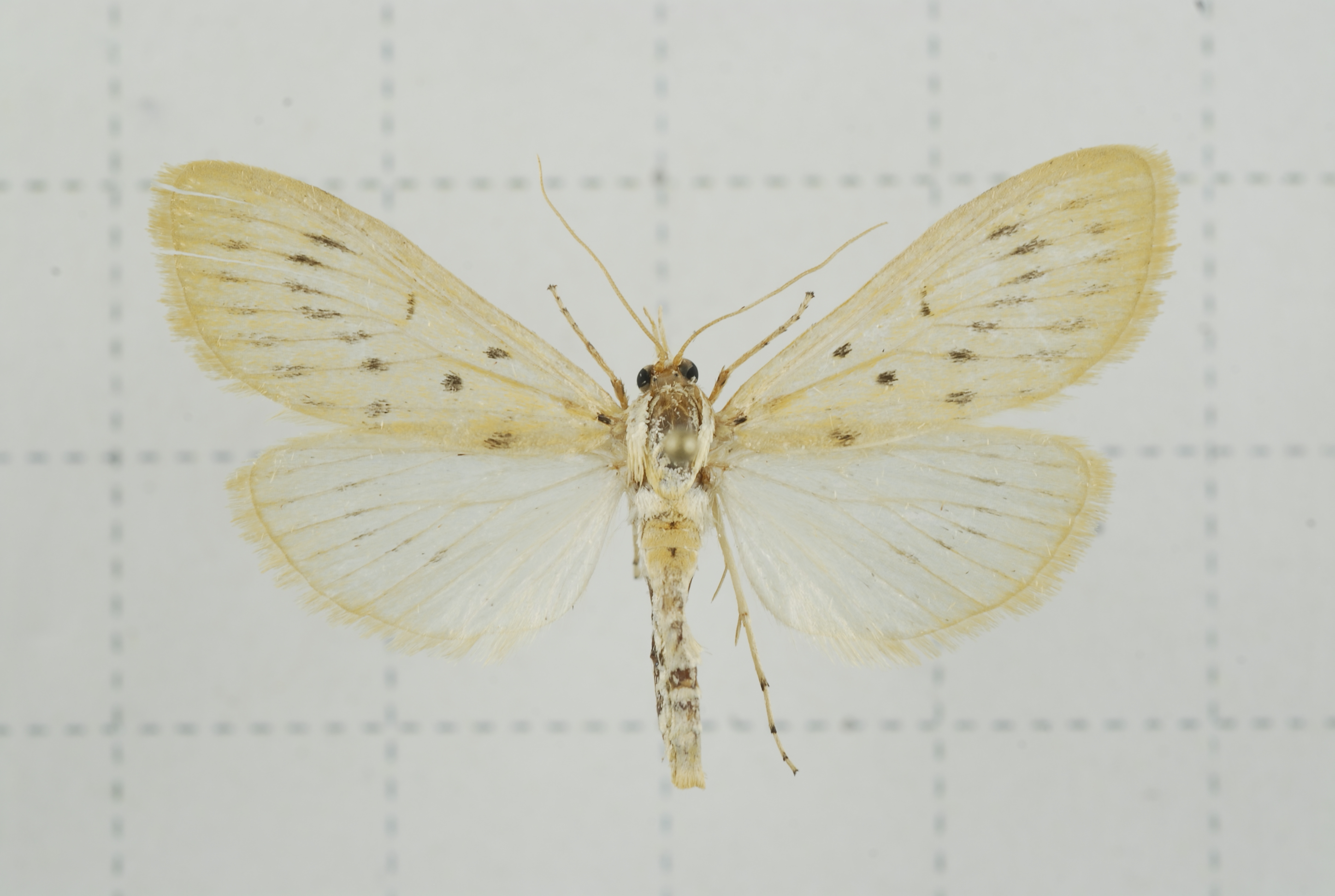

Scientific classification
- Kingdom: Animalia
- Phylum: Arthropoda
- Clade: Pancrustacea
- Class: Insecta
- Order: Lepidoptera
- Family: Crambidae
- Genus: Epipagis
- Species: E. setinalis

Binomial name
- Epipagis setinalis Hampson, 1918

= Epipagis setinalis =

Species of moth

Epipagis setinalis is a moth in the family Crambidae. It is found in Taiwan.
