= Heortia iridia =

Scientific classification
- Domain: Eukaryota
- Kingdom: Animalia
- Phylum: Arthropoda
- Class: Insecta
- Order: Lepidoptera
- Family: Crambidae
- Genus: Heortia
- Species: H. iridia

Binomial name
- Heortia iridia Munroe, 1977

Species of moth

Heortia iridia is a moth in the family Crambidae. It was described by Eugene G. Munroe in 1977. It is found in Indonesia, where it has been recorded from Sulawesi.
