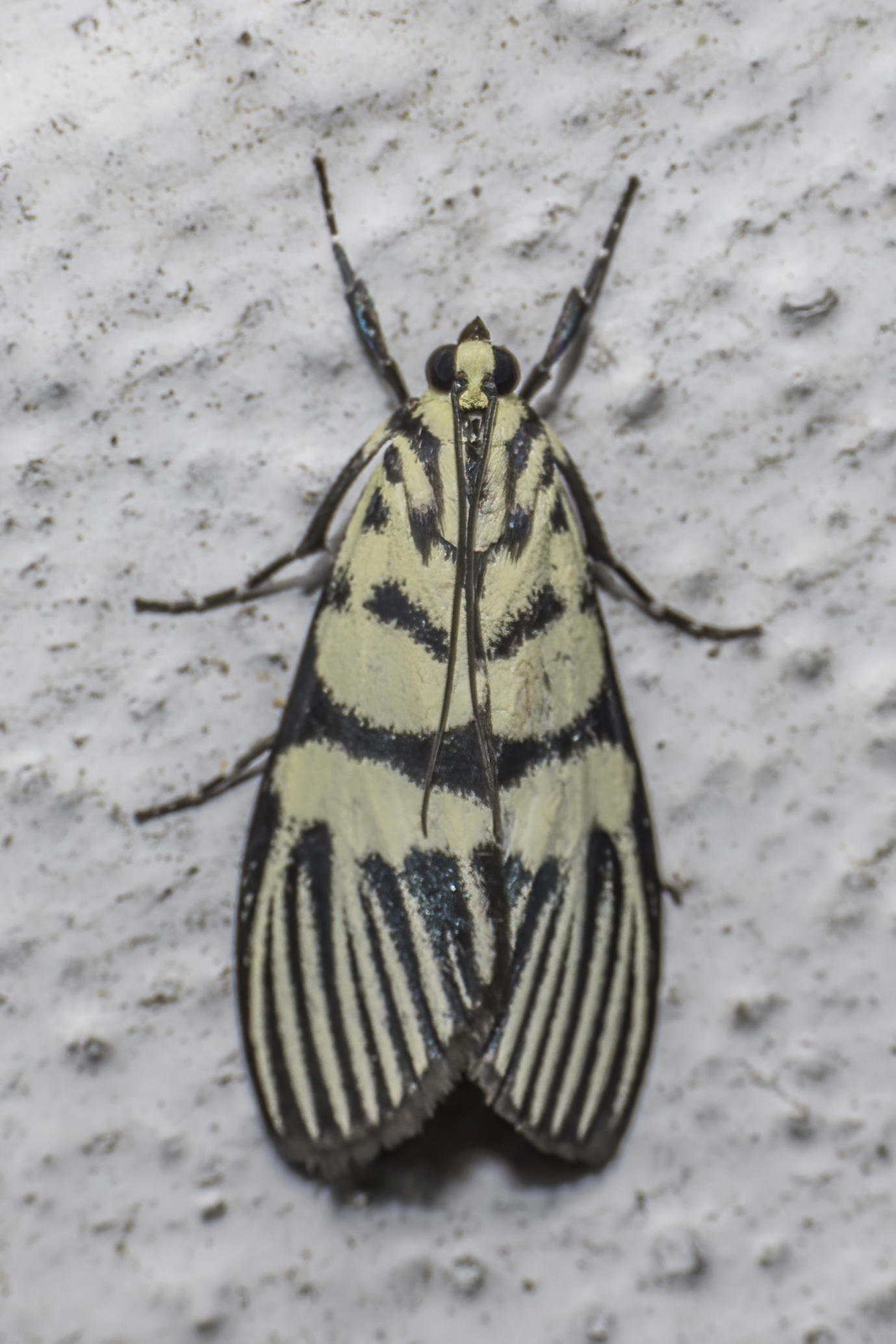

Scientific classification
- Kingdom: Animalia
- Phylum: Arthropoda
- Clade: Pancrustacea
- Class: Insecta
- Order: Lepidoptera
- Family: Crambidae
- Genus: Heortia
- Species: H. vitessoides

Binomial name
- Heortia vitessoides (Moore, [1885])

Synonyms
- Tyspana vitessoides Moore, [1885]

= Heortia vitessoides =

Species of moth

Heortia vitessoides is a moth of the family Crambidae described by Frederic Moore in 1885. It is found in south-east Asia, including Fiji, Hong Kong, India, Taiwan, Thailand and northern Queensland in Australia.

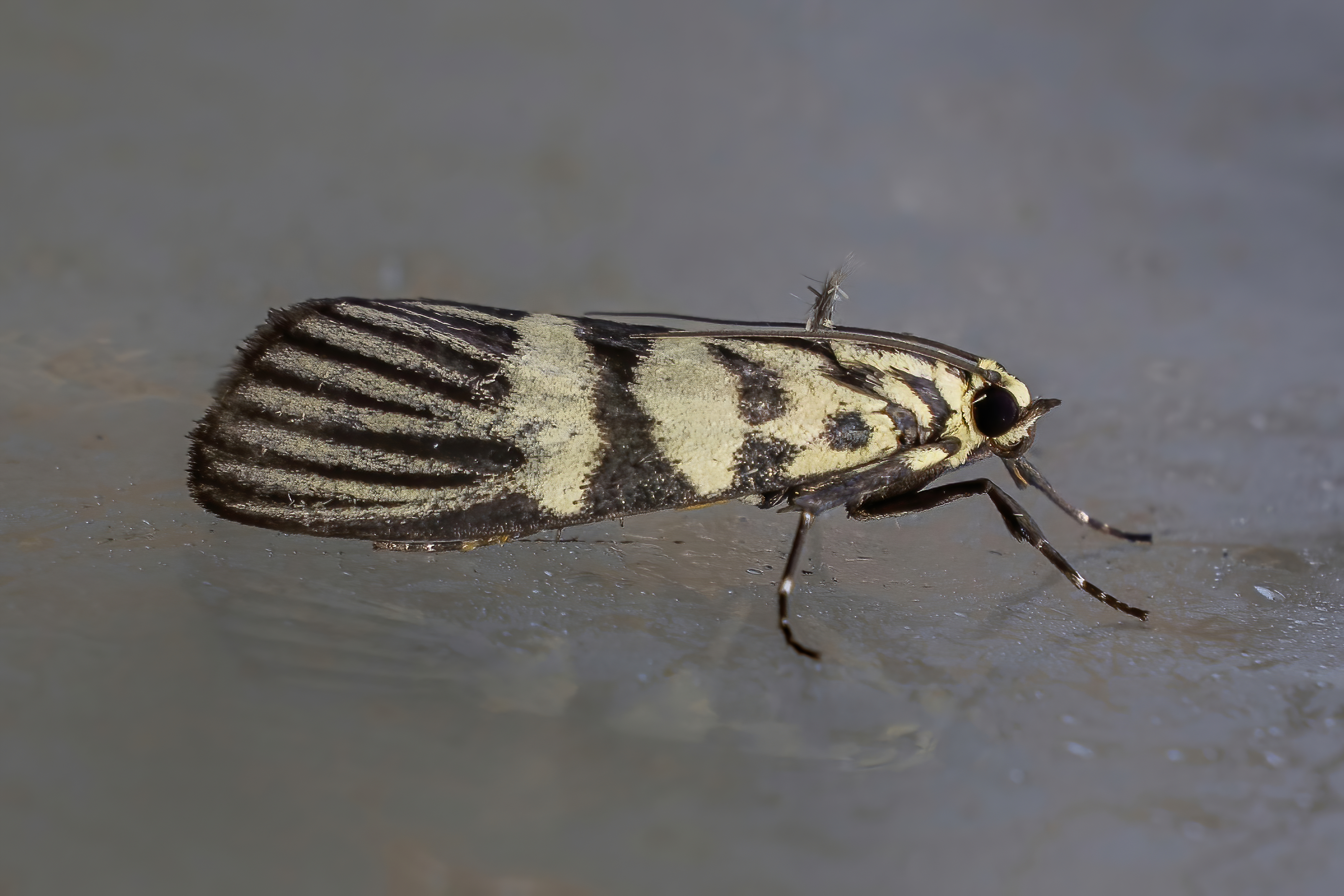

The wingspan is about 30 mm.
