= Sameodes furvipicta =

Scientific classification
- Kingdom: Animalia
- Phylum: Arthropoda
- Class: Insecta
- Order: Lepidoptera
- Family: Crambidae
- Genus: Sameodes
- Species: S. furvipicta

Binomial name
- Sameodes furvipicta Hampson, 1913

Species of moth

Sameodes furvipicta is a moth in the family Crambidae. It is found in Papua New Guinea.

The wingspan is about 22 mm. The forewings are grey-brown with a leaden gloss. The base of the costal and inner areas is fulvous red and the costa pale yellow. There is an antemedial white spot defined by fulvous red from the costa to below the cell and a medial white band defined by fulvous red from the costa to above the inner margin, formed by two spots separated by a red streak on the median nervure. There is a postmedial white spot defined by fulvous red from the costal area to vein 3 and the terminal area is yellow except at the apex and expanding between veins 6 and 2. The hindwings have a fulvous red basal half, a large hyaline white patch beyond the cell and an oblique spot below the end of the cell, as well as a dark postmedial band tinged with leaden-grey. The terminal area is yellow, narrowing to the tornus and the inner margin is yellow.
