= Sameodes finbaralis =

Scientific classification
- Kingdom: Animalia
- Phylum: Arthropoda
- Class: Insecta
- Order: Lepidoptera
- Family: Crambidae
- Genus: Sameodes
- Species: S. finbaralis

Binomial name
- Sameodes finbaralis Schaus, 1927

Species of moth

Sameodes finbaralis is a moth in the family Crambidae. It is found in the Philippines (Luzon).

The wingspan is about 29 mm.
