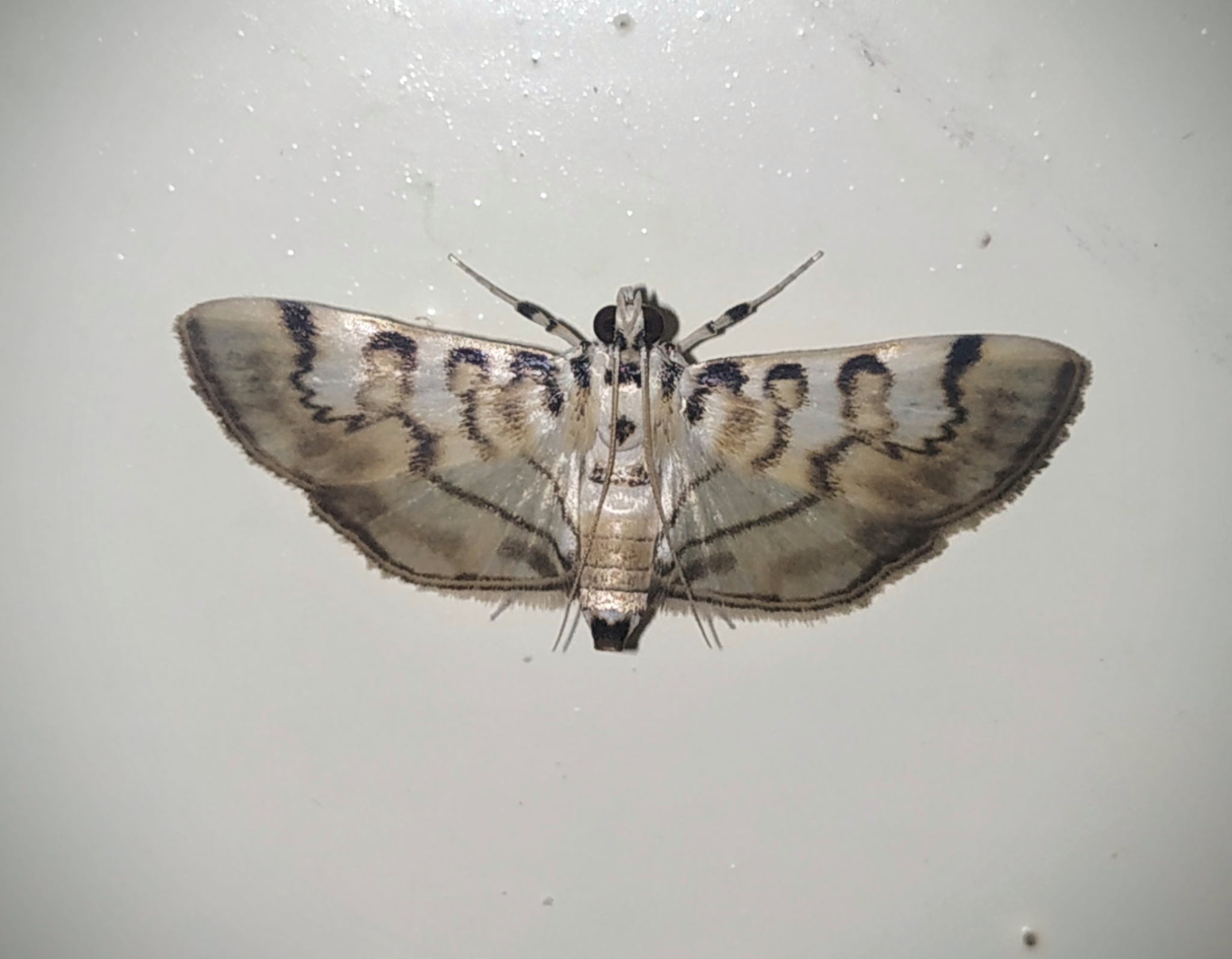
- Tabidia insanalis

Scientific classification
- Kingdom: Animalia
- Phylum: Arthropoda
- Clade: Pancrustacea
- Class: Insecta
- Order: Lepidoptera
- Family: Crambidae
- Subfamily: Pyraustinae
- Genus: Tabidia; Snellen, 1880

= Tabidia =

Genus of moths

Tabidia is a genus of moths of the family Crambidae described by Pieter Cornelius Tobias Snellen 1880.

== Species ==
- Tabidia aculealis (Walker, 1866) (from Indonesia and Sri Lanka)
- Tabidia candidalis (Warren, 1896) (from China and India)
- Tabidia craterodes Meyrick, 1894 (from Borneo)
- Tabidia flexulalis Snellen, 1899 (from New Guinea)
- Tabidia fuscifusalis Hampson, 1917 (from Sri Lanka)
- Tabidia inconsequens (Warren, 1896)
- Tabidia insanalis Snellen, 1879 (Borneo, Celebes, Papua New Guinea)
- Tabidia obvia Du & Li, 2014 (from China)
- Tabidia nacoleialis Hampson, 1912 (from Malaysia)
- Tabidia strigiferalis Hampson, 1900 (from China, Korea and Russia)
- Tabidia truncatalis Hampson, 1899 (New Guinea and Australia)
