= Tabidia inconsequens =

Scientific classification
- Domain: Eukaryota
- Kingdom: Animalia
- Phylum: Arthropoda
- Class: Insecta
- Order: Lepidoptera
- Family: Crambidae
- Genus: Tabidia
- Species: T. inconsequens

Binomial name
- Tabidia inconsequens (Warren, 1896)

Synonyms
- Nymphula inconsequens Warren, 1896

Species of moth

Tabidia inconsequens is a moth in the family Crambidae. It was described by William Warren in 1896. It is found in India and Australia.

The wingspan is about 18 mm. The forewings are white, almost wholly suffused with yellowish, the white ground color restricted to the costa and the course of the subterminal line. The first line is vertically sinuous at one-third, blackish, rising beyond a large blackish coastal spot. There is a blackish costal annulus close to the base, and a black spot near the middle of the basal area. The second line runs rather obliquely outward and is bluntly angulated in the mid-wing, and attains the inner margin at two-thirds, where it is thickened. The coastal area between the two lines is broadly white and the linear black cell spot is edged with white. The subterminal line is found near to and parallel to the hind margin and is formed by black spots and edged rather broadly on the inner side with white. The costa between the second line and the subterminal line is marked with three black white-edged spots. The hindwings are dingy ochreous grey, with very faint indications of a submarginal line.
