= Sameodes polythiptalis =

Scientific classification
- Kingdom: Animalia
- Phylum: Arthropoda
- Class: Insecta
- Order: Lepidoptera
- Family: Crambidae
- Genus: Sameodes
- Species: S. polythiptalis

Binomial name
- Sameodes polythiptalis Hampson, 1899

Synonyms
- Epipagis polythiptalis

Species of moth

Sameodes polythiptalis is a moth in the family Crambidae. It is found in Irian Jaya, Indonesia.
