= Epipagis roseocinctalis =

Scientific classification
- Kingdom: Animalia
- Phylum: Arthropoda
- Class: Insecta
- Order: Lepidoptera
- Family: Crambidae
- Genus: Epipagis
- Species: E. roseocinctalis

Binomial name
- Epipagis roseocinctalis (Hampson, 1913)

Synonyms
- Sameodes roseocinctalis Hampson, 1913

Species of moth

Epipagis roseocinctalis is a moth in the family Crambidae. It is found in South Africa.
