= Epipagis lygialis =

Scientific classification
- Kingdom: Animalia
- Phylum: Arthropoda
- Class: Insecta
- Order: Lepidoptera
- Family: Crambidae
- Genus: Epipagis
- Species: E. lygialis

Binomial name
- Epipagis lygialis (Snellen, 1899)

Synonyms
- Orobena lygialis Snellen, 1899

Species of moth

Epipagis lygialis is a moth in the family Crambidae. It is found on Borneo and Java.
