= Heortia iospora =

Scientific classification
- Kingdom: Animalia
- Phylum: Arthropoda
- Class: Insecta
- Order: Lepidoptera
- Family: Crambidae
- Genus: Heortia
- Species: H. iospora

Binomial name
- Heortia iospora (Meyrick, 1936)

Synonyms
- Oeobia iospora Meyrick, 1936; Noorda pyrographa Meyrick, 1937

Species of moth

Heortia iospora is a moth in the family Crambidae. It was described by Edward Meyrick in 1936. It is found in the Democratic Republic of the Congo.
