= Tabidia fuscifusalis =

Scientific classification
- Domain: Eukaryota
- Kingdom: Animalia
- Phylum: Arthropoda
- Class: Insecta
- Order: Lepidoptera
- Family: Crambidae
- Genus: Tabidia
- Species: T. fuscifusalis

Binomial name
- Tabidia fuscifusalis Hampson, 1917

Species of moth

Tabidia fuscifusalis is a moth in the family Crambidae. It was described by George Hampson in 1917. It is found in Sri Lanka.
