= Heortia polyplagalis =

Scientific classification
- Kingdom: Animalia
- Phylum: Arthropoda
- Class: Insecta
- Order: Lepidoptera
- Family: Crambidae
- Genus: Heortia
- Species: H. polyplagalis

Binomial name
- Heortia polyplagalis Hampson, 1913

Species of moth

Heortia polyplagalis is a moth in the family Crambidae. It was described by George Hampson in 1913. It is found in Indonesia, where it has been recorded from Sulawesi.
