= Tabidia flexulalis =

Scientific classification
- Kingdom: Animalia
- Phylum: Arthropoda
- Class: Insecta
- Order: Lepidoptera
- Family: Crambidae
- Genus: Tabidia
- Species: T. flexulalis

Binomial name
- Tabidia flexulalis Snellen, 1899

Species of moth

Tabidia flexulalis is a moth in the family Crambidae. It was described by Snellen in 1899. It is found in New Guinea.
