= Epipagis citrinalis =

Scientific classification
- Kingdom: Animalia
- Phylum: Arthropoda
- Class: Insecta
- Order: Lepidoptera
- Family: Crambidae
- Genus: Epipagis
- Species: E. citrinalis

Binomial name
- Epipagis citrinalis (Hampson, 1899)

Synonyms
- Sameodes citrinalis Hampson, 1899

Species of moth

Epipagis citrinalis is a moth in the family Crambidae. It is found on Dominica.
