= Tabidia craterodes =

Scientific classification
- Kingdom: Animalia
- Phylum: Arthropoda
- Class: Insecta
- Order: Lepidoptera
- Family: Crambidae
- Genus: Tabidia
- Species: T. craterodes

Binomial name
- Tabidia craterodes Meyrick, 1894

Species of moth

Tabidia craterodes is a moth in the family Crambidae. It was described by Edward Meyrick in 1894. It is found on Borneo.
