= Sameodes alexalis =

Scientific classification
- Kingdom: Animalia
- Phylum: Arthropoda
- Class: Insecta
- Order: Lepidoptera
- Family: Crambidae
- Genus: Sameodes
- Species: S. alexalis

Binomial name
- Sameodes alexalis Schaus, 1927

Species of moth

Sameodes alexalis is a moth in the family Crambidae. It is found in the Philippines (Luzon).

The wingspan is about 27 mm. The wings are pale orange yellow, the forewings with a black spot at the base of the cell and a vertical antemedial dark vinaceous drab line, which is narrow on the costa and expands to the inner margin where it extends to the postmedial which is narrow on the costa, vertical on the inner edge, outbent on the outer edge to near the termen above the tornus and abruptly inbent, leaving the terminal portion of the inner margin orange yellow. There is a small black spot at the cell over veins 3 and 4. The hindwings have dark vinaceous drab postmedial line which is narrow on the costa.
