= Tabidia candidalis =

Scientific classification
- Domain: Eukaryota
- Kingdom: Animalia
- Phylum: Arthropoda
- Class: Insecta
- Order: Lepidoptera
- Family: Crambidae
- Genus: Tabidia
- Species: T. candidalis

Binomial name
- Tabidia candidalis (Warren, 1896)

Synonyms
- Aripana candidalis Warren, 1896

Species of moth

Tabidia candidalis is a moth in the family Crambidae. It is found in China (Zhejiang, Guangdong) and India.

The wingspan is 15–18 mm.
