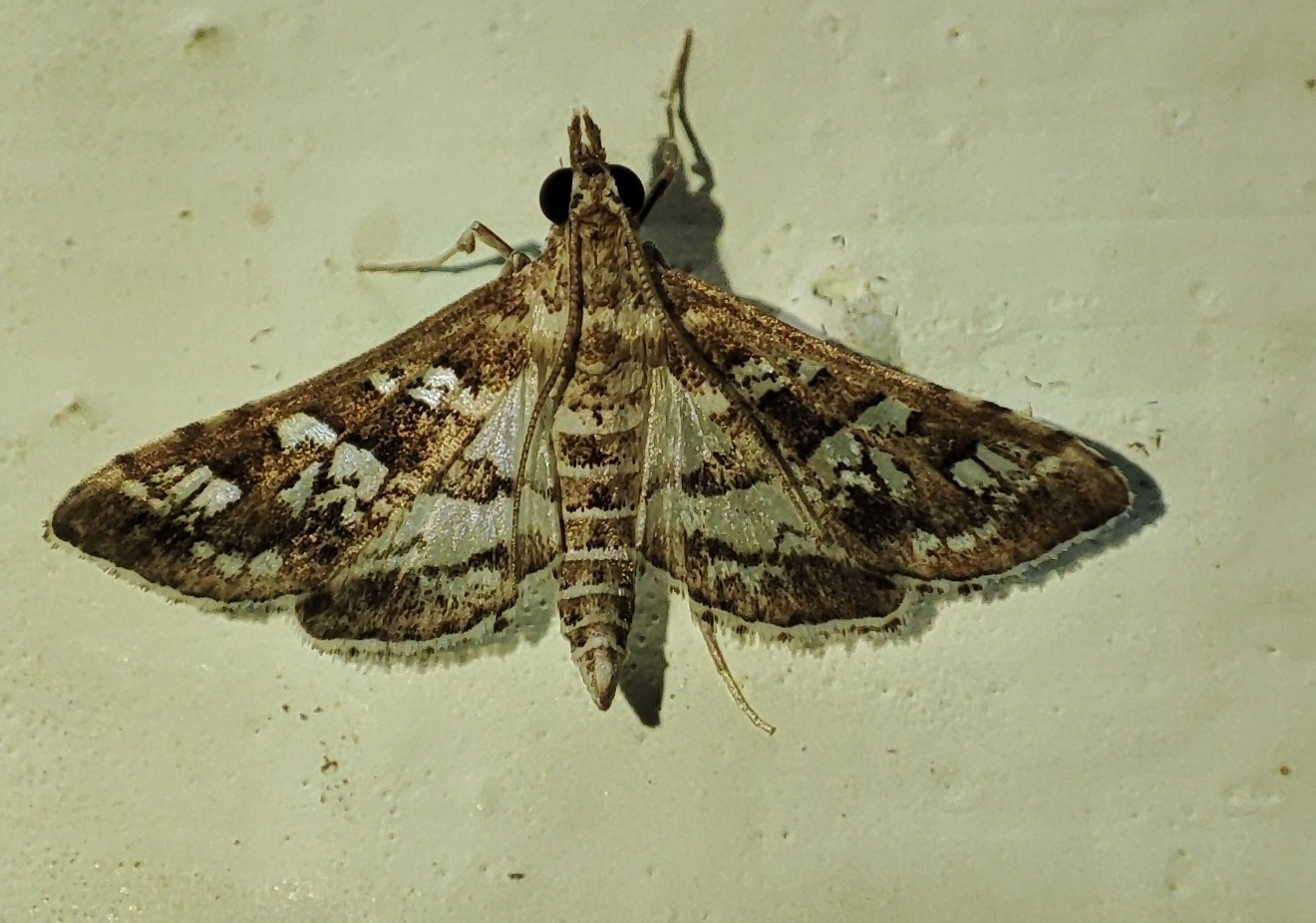

Scientific classification
- Kingdom: Animalia
- Phylum: Arthropoda
- Class: Insecta
- Order: Lepidoptera
- Family: Crambidae
- Genus: Epipagis
- Species: E. peritalis

Binomial name
- Epipagis peritalis (Walker, 1859)

Synonyms
- Lepyrodes peritalis Walker, 1859

= Epipagis peritalis =

Species of moth

Epipagis peritalis is a moth in the family Crambidae found in Sri Lanka.
