= Tabidia nacoleialis =

Scientific classification
- Kingdom: Animalia
- Phylum: Arthropoda
- Class: Insecta
- Order: Lepidoptera
- Family: Crambidae
- Genus: Tabidia
- Species: T. nacoleialis

Binomial name
- Tabidia nacoleialis Hampson, 1912

Species of moth

Tabidia nacoleialis is a moth in the family Crambidae. It was described by George Hampson in 1912. It is found in Malaysia.
