= Epipagis zinghalis =

Scientific classification
- Kingdom: Animalia
- Phylum: Arthropoda
- Clade: Pancrustacea
- Class: Insecta
- Order: Lepidoptera
- Family: Crambidae
- Genus: Epipagis
- Species: E. zinghalis

Binomial name
- Epipagis zinghalis (Walker, 1859)

Synonyms
- Samea zinghalis Walker, 1859

Species of moth

Epipagis zinghalis is a moth in the family Crambidae. It is found in Venezuela, Costa Rica and Jamaica.
