= Sameodes ennoduisalis =

Scientific classification
- Kingdom: Animalia
- Phylum: Arthropoda
- Class: Insecta
- Order: Lepidoptera
- Family: Crambidae
- Genus: Sameodes
- Species: S. ennoduisalis

Binomial name
- Sameodes ennoduisalis Schaus, 1927

Species of insect

Sameodes ennoduisalis is a moth in the family Crambidae. It is found in the Philippines (Luzon).

The wingspan is about 27 mm. The wings are light orange yellow, the forewings with a small black spot at the base of the cell, and a slightly larger spot over the base of veins 3 and 4. There are black antemedial and medial spots on the inner margin and a small subterminal spot on vein 3. The hindwings have a black medial spot on the costa.
