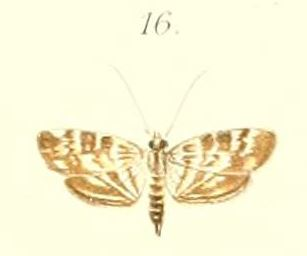

Scientific classification
- Kingdom: Animalia
- Phylum: Arthropoda
- Class: Insecta
- Order: Lepidoptera
- Family: Crambidae
- Genus: Tabidia
- Species: T. insanalis

Binomial name
- Tabidia insanalis Snellen, 1879

Synonyms
- Heterocnephes felix Butler, 1887; Hydrocampa stenioides Butler, 1882; Orphnophanes strigatalis Pagenstecher, 1900; Tabidia marmarodes Turner, 1937

= Tabidia insanalis =

Species of moth

Tabidia insanalis is a moth of the family Crambidae. The species was described by Pieter Cornelius Tobias Snellen in 1879. It is found on Borneo, Sulawesi, Papua New Guinea and Queensland, Australia.

The larvae are green with brown speckles on the thorax and tail.
