= Tabidia strigiferalis =

Scientific classification
- Kingdom: Animalia
- Phylum: Arthropoda
- Class: Insecta
- Order: Lepidoptera
- Family: Crambidae
- Genus: Tabidia
- Species: T. strigiferalis

Binomial name
- Tabidia strigiferalis Hampson, 1900

Synonyms
- Epipagis strigiferalis

Species of moth

Tabidia strigiferalis is a moth in the family Crambidae. It is found in China (Heilongjiang, Liaoning, Tianjing, Hebei, Shaanxi, Gansu, Henan, Anhui, Hubei, Chongqing, Sichuan, Guizhou, Zhejiang, Fujian, Guangdong, Hainan), Korea and Russia.

The wingspan is 18–24 mm. The forewings are pale yellow or pale ochreous with a basal black point. The antemedial line is represented by black or fuscous spots and there is a black spot below the discal cell near the base. The orbicular stigma and discoidal stigma are black and there is a series of short black streaks along the vein. The postmedial line is represented by a series of black or fuscous spots and there are some indistinct fuscous streaks in the terminal interspaces. The hindwings are yellowish-white and the subterminal line consists of a series of small fuscous points. The terminal area is pale yellow, but brown near the tornus.
