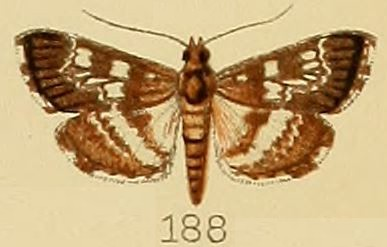

Scientific classification
- Kingdom: Animalia
- Phylum: Arthropoda
- Class: Insecta
- Order: Lepidoptera
- Family: Crambidae
- Genus: Epipagis
- Species: E. tristalis

Binomial name
- Epipagis tristalis (Kenrick, 1907)

Synonyms
- Sameodes tristalis Kenrick, 1907; Diasemia wollastoni Rothschild, 1915; Diasemia wollastoni minor Rothschild, 1915

= Epipagis tristalis =

Species of moth

Epipagis tristalis is a small moth in the family Crambidae that is found in Papua New Guinea. It was described by George Hamilton Kenrick in 1907 based on insects collected by Antwerp Edgar Pratt. Pratt wrote Two Years among New Guinea Cannibals based on his time there.

It has a wingspan of 24 mm.

== Subspecies ==
- Epipagis tristalis tristalis Kenrick, 1907
- Epipagis tristalis minor Rothschild, 1916
