= Heortia ocellata =

Scientific classification
- Kingdom: Animalia
- Phylum: Arthropoda
- Class: Insecta
- Order: Lepidoptera
- Family: Crambidae
- Genus: Heortia
- Species: H. ocellata

Binomial name
- Heortia ocellata (Hampson, 1916)

Synonyms
- Sameodes ocellata Hampson, 1916

Species of moth

Heortia ocellata is a moth in the family Crambidae. It was described by George Hampson in 1916. It is found in the Democratic Republic of the Congo, Ghana and Kenya.

The larvae have been recorded feeding on Funtumia elastica and Holarrhena floribunda.
