= Pessocosma prolalis =

Scientific classification
- Kingdom: Animalia
- Phylum: Arthropoda
- Class: Insecta
- Order: Lepidoptera
- Family: Crambidae
- Genus: Pessocosma
- Species: P. prolalis

Binomial name
- Pessocosma prolalis (Viette & Legrand, 1958)

Synonyms
- Epipagis prolalis Viette & Legrand, 1958

Species of moth

Pessocosma prolalis is a moth in the family Crambidae. It is found on the Seychelles, where it has been recorded from Aldabra, Cosmoledo and Menai.
