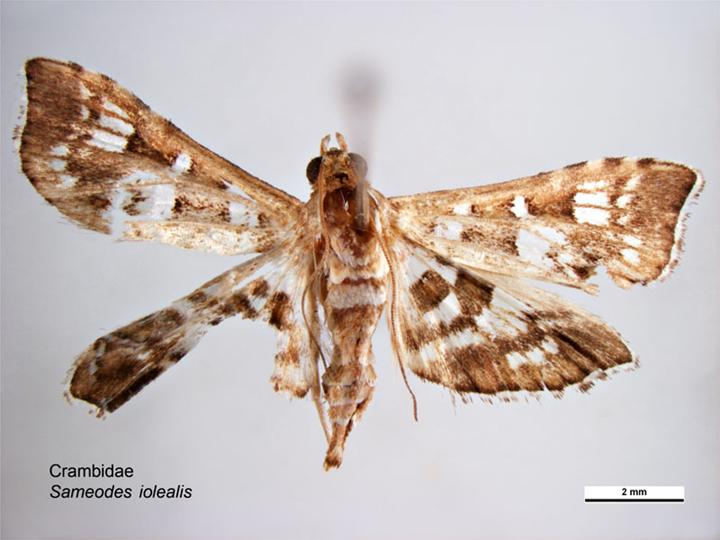
- Dorsal view
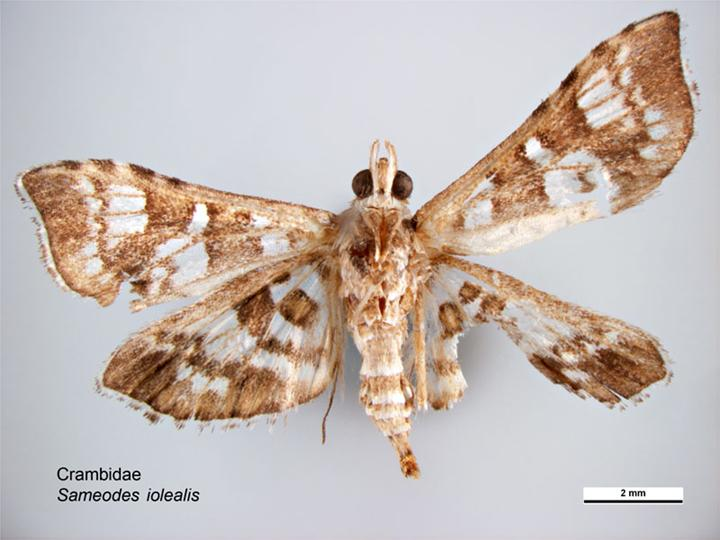
- Ventral view

Scientific classification
- Kingdom: Animalia
- Phylum: Arthropoda
- Class: Insecta
- Order: Lepidoptera
- Family: Crambidae
- Genus: Pessocosma
- Species: P. iolealis

Binomial name
- Pessocosma iolealis (Walker, 1859)

Synonyms
- Lepyrodes iolealis Walker, 1859; Sameodes iolealis

= Pessocosma iolealis =

Species of moth

Pessocosma iolealis is a moth of the family Crambidae. It is found in Australia.
