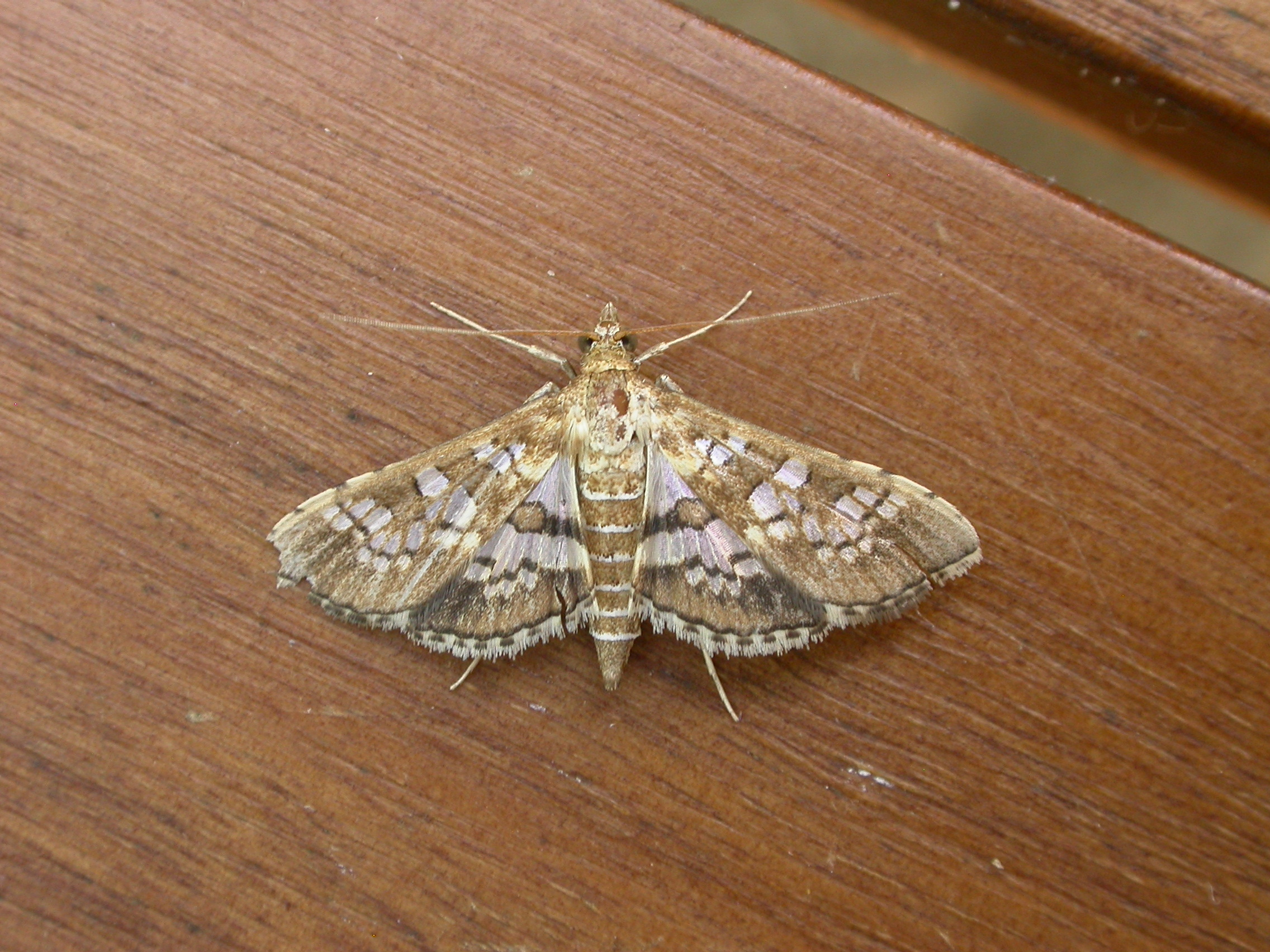

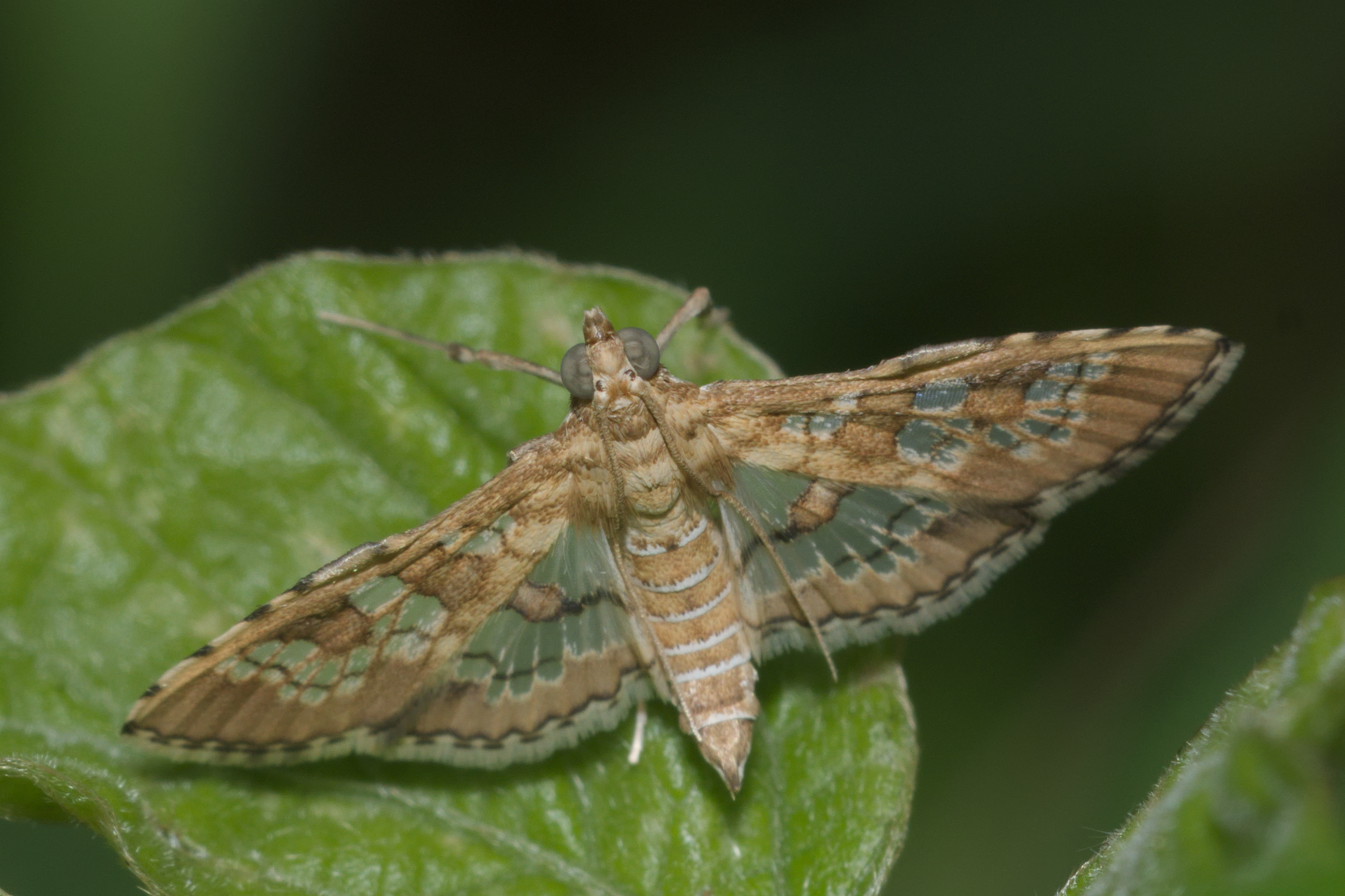

Scientific classification
- Kingdom: Animalia
- Phylum: Arthropoda
- Clade: Pancrustacea
- Class: Insecta
- Order: Lepidoptera
- Family: Crambidae
- Genus: Sameodes
- Species: S. cancellalis

Binomial name
- Sameodes cancellalis (Zeller, 1852)

Synonyms
- Botys cancellalis Zeller, 1852; Hymenia meridionalis Walker, 1866; Lepyrodes lepidalis Walker, 1859; Samea sidealis Walker, 1859; Samea vespertinalis Saalmüller, 1880; Sameodes trithyralis Snellen, 1880; Stenia pipleisalis Walker, 1859

= Sameodes cancellalis =

Species of moth

Sameodes cancellalis, also called the Banded Pearl moth, is a species of moth of the family Crambidae described by Philipp Christoph Zeller in 1852. It has a wide distribution and has been recorded from India, Sri Lanka, Nepal, Myanmar, Thailand, Indochina, Taiwan, Japan, China, Indonesia, Malaysia, the Philippines, New Guinea, western and southern Africa, Fiji, the Cook Islands, and Queensland, Australia.
