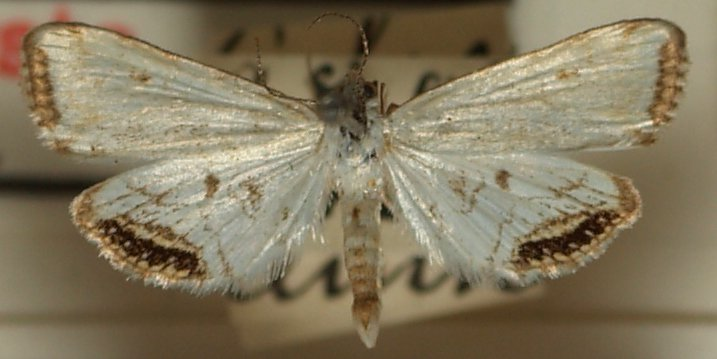
- Cataclysta lemnata

Scientific classification
- Kingdom: Animalia
- Phylum: Arthropoda
- Class: Insecta
- Order: Lepidoptera
- Family: Crambidae
- Subfamily: Acentropinae
- Genus: Cataclysta; Hübner, 1825

Species
- See text

Synonyms
- Catoclysta Hampson, 1893; Chalcoelopsis Dyar, 1914; Cryptocosma Lederer, 1863; Eugauria Snellen, 1901

= Cataclysta =

Genus of moths

Cataclysta is a genus of moths described by Jacob Hübner in 1825.

== Species ==
- Cataclysta aclistalis Dyar, 1914
- Cataclysta albifulvalis Marion, 1956
- Cataclysta albipunctalis Hampson, 1897
- Cataclysta ambahonalis (Marion, 1954)
- Cataclysta amboinalis Hampson, 1917
- Cataclysta angulata Moore, 1885
- Cataclysta confusalis Marion, 1956
- Cataclysta hexalitha Meyrick, 1886
- Cataclysta lampetialis Walker, 1859
- Cataclysta lemnata (Linnaeus, 1758)
- Cataclysta marginipuncta Turner, 1937
- Cataclysta melanolitha (Turner, 1908)
- Cataclysta ochrealis Marion, 1956
- Cataclysta pleonaxalis (Hampson, 1897)
- Cataclysta polyrrapha Turner, 1937
- Cataclysta polystictalis (Hampson, 1906)
- Cataclysta psathyrodes Turner, 1908
- Cataclysta pusillalis Saalmüller, 1880
- Cataclysta quintula (Meyrick, 1938)
- Cataclysta seriopunctalis (Hampson, 1897)
- Cataclysta suffuscalis Marion, 1956
- Cataclysta supercilialis Hampson, 1897

== Former species ==
- Cataclysta argyrochrysalis Mabille, 1900
- Cataclysta callichromalis Mabille, 1879
- Cataclysta cyanolitha Meyrick, 1886
- Cataclysta diehlalis Marion, 1956
- Cataclysta leroii Strand, 1915
- Cataclysta nyasalis Hampson, 1917
- Cataclysta perirrorata Hampson, 1917
