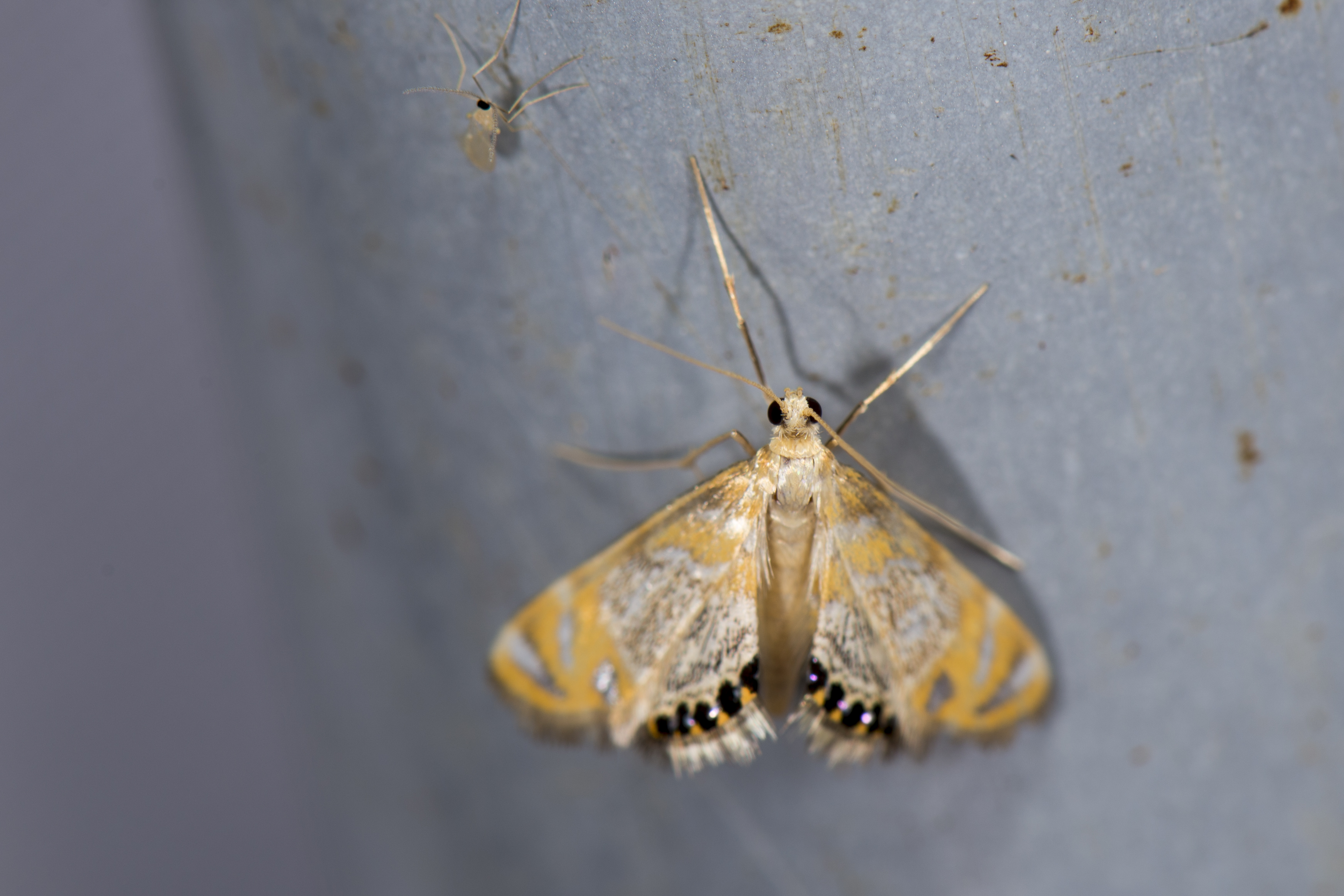
- Nymphicula yoshiyasui

Scientific classification
- Kingdom: Animalia
- Phylum: Arthropoda
- Class: Insecta
- Order: Lepidoptera
- Family: Crambidae
- Subfamily: Acentropinae
- Genus: Nymphicula; Snellen, [1880]

= Nymphicula =

Genus of moths

Nymphicula is a genus of moths of the family Crambidae.

== Species ==
- Nymphicula acuminatalis Snellen, 1880
- Nymphicula adelphalis D. Agassiz, 2014
- Nymphicula albibasalis Yoshiyasu, 1980
- Nymphicula albidorsalis Speidel, 1998
- Nymphicula argyrochrysalis Mabille, 1900
- Nymphicula atriterminalis Hampson, 1917
- Nymphicula australis C. Felder, R. Felder & Rogenhofer, 1875
- Nymphicula banauensis Speidel, 2003
- Nymphicula beni Agassiz, 2014
- Nymphicula blandialis Walker, 1859
- Nymphicula bombayensis Swinhoe & Cotes, 1889
- Nymphicula callichromalis Mabille, 1878
- Nymphicula cheesmanae Agassiz, 2014
- Nymphicula christinae Agassiz, 2014
- Nymphicula concaviuscula You, Li & Wang, 2003
- Nymphicula conjunctalis Agassiz, 2014
- Nymphicula cyanolitha Meyrick, 1886
- Nymphicula diehlalis Marion, 1957
- Nymphicula drusiusalis Walker, 1859
- Nymphicula eberti Speidel, 1998
- Nymphicula edwardsi Agassiz, 2014
- Nymphicula fionae Agassiz, 2014
- Nymphicula hampsoni Agassiz, 2014
- Nymphicula hexaxantha Agassiz, 2012
- Nymphicula infuscatalis Snellen, 1880
- Nymphicula insulalis Agassiz, 2014
- Nymphicula irianalis Agassiz, 2014
- Nymphicula junctalis Hampson, 1891
- Nymphicula kinabaluensis Mey, 2009
- Nymphicula lactealis Agassiz, 2014
- Nymphicula lifuensis Agassiz, 2014
- Nymphicula luzonensis Yoshiyasu, 1997
- Nymphicula manilensis Sauber in Semper, 1899
- Nymphicula mesorphna Meyrick, 1894
- Nymphicula meyi Speidel, 1998
- Nymphicula michaeli Agassiz, 2014
- Nymphicula mindorensis Speidel, 2003
- Nymphicula monticola Agassiz, 2014
- Nymphicula morimotoi Yoshiyasu, 1997
- Nymphicula negrosensis Speidel, 2003
- Nymphicula nigristriata Hampson, 1917
- Nymphicula nigritalis Hampson, 1893
- Nymphicula nigrolunalis Speidel, 1998
- Nymphicula nokensis Agassiz, 2014
- Nymphicula nyasalis Hampson, 1917
- Nymphicula ochrepunctalis Agassiz, 2014
- Nymphicula patnalis C. Felder, R. Felder & Rogenhofer, 1875
- Nymphicula perirrorata Hampson, 1917
- Nymphicula plumbilinealis Agassiz, 2014
- Nymphicula queenslandica Hampson, 1917
- Nymphicula saigusai Yoshiyasu, 1980
- Nymphicula samarensis Speidel, 2003
- Nymphicula samoensis Agassiz, 2014
- Nymphicula silauensis Mey, 2009
- Nymphicula stipalis Snellen, 1880
- Nymphicula submarginalis Agassiz, 2014
- Nymphicula susannae Agassiz, 2014
- Nymphicula tariensis Agassiz, 2014
- Nymphicula torresalis Agassiz, 2014
- Nymphicula trimacula Hampson, 1891
- Nymphicula tripunctata Yoshiyasu, 1987
- Nymphicula xanthobathra Meyrick, 1894
- Nymphicula xanthocostalis Agassiz, 2014
- Nymphicula yoshiyasui D. J. L. Agassiz, 2002
- Nymphicula zambalensis Speidel, 2003

== Former species ==
- Nymphicula capensis Hampson, 1906
- Nymphicula dorophanes Meyrick, 1937
- Nymphicula lithorma Meyrick, 1936
- Nymphicula mimicalis Hampson, 1917
- Nymphicula sphragidacma Meyrick, 1937
- Nymphicula tetropalis Hampson, 1906
- Nymphicula triopalis Hampson, 1906
