= Nymphicula junctalis =

Scientific classification
- Kingdom: Animalia
- Phylum: Arthropoda
- Class: Insecta
- Order: Lepidoptera
- Family: Crambidae
- Genus: Nymphicula
- Species: N. junctalis

Binomial name
- Nymphicula junctalis (Hampson, 1891)

Synonyms
- Cataclysta junctalis Hampson, 1891

Species of moth

Nymphicula junctalis is a moth in the family Crambidae. It was described by George Hampson in 1891. It is found in India in the Nilgiri Mountains and Kanara district. Records from Japan refer to Nymphicula yoshiyasui.

The wingspan is 14–15 mm.
