= Margarosticha =

Scientific classification
- Kingdom: Animalia
- Phylum: Arthropoda
- Clade: Pancrustacea
- Class: Insecta
- Order: Lepidoptera
- Family: Crambidae
- Genus: Margarosticha; Lederer, 1863

Genus of moths

Margarosticha is a genus of moths of the family Crambidae.

== Species ==
- Margarosticha argyrograpta Hampson, 1917
- Margarosticha aurantifusa Munroe, 1959
- Margarosticha bimaculalis Snellen, 1880
- Margarosticha euprepialis Hampson, 1917
- Margarosticha gaudialis Hampson, 1917
- Margarosticha leucozonalis Hampson, 1897
- Margarosticha nesiotes Munroe, 1959
- Margarosticha nigrescens Speidel, 2003
- Margarosticha papuensis Munroe, 1959
- Margarosticha plumbealis Kenrick, 1912
- Margarosticha pulcherrimalis Lederer, 1863
- Margarosticha repetitalis (Warren, 1896)
- Margarosticha sphenotis Meyrick, 1887

== Former species ==
- Margarosticha australis (C. Felder, R. Felder & Rogenhofer, 1875)
