= Cataclysta polyrrapha =

Scientific classification
- Domain: Eukaryota
- Kingdom: Animalia
- Phylum: Arthropoda
- Class: Insecta
- Order: Lepidoptera
- Family: Crambidae
- Genus: Cataclysta
- Species: C. polyrrapha

Binomial name
- Cataclysta polyrrapha Turner, 1937

Species of moth

Cataclysta polyrrapha is a Crambidae species in the genus Cataclysta. It was described by Turner in 1937, and is known from Australia.
