= Nymphicula christinae =

Scientific classification
- Domain: Eukaryota
- Kingdom: Animalia
- Phylum: Arthropoda
- Class: Insecta
- Order: Lepidoptera
- Family: Crambidae
- Genus: Nymphicula
- Species: N. christinae

Binomial name
- Nymphicula christinae Agassiz, 2014

Species of moth

Nymphicula christinae is a moth in the family Crambidae. It was described by David John Lawrence Agassiz in 2014. It is found in Australia, where it has been recorded from Queensland.

The wingspan is 12–13 mm. The base of the forewing is brown.

== Etymology ==
The species is named for the daughter of the author.
