= Cataclysta aclistalis =

Scientific classification
- Kingdom: Animalia
- Phylum: Arthropoda
- Class: Insecta
- Order: Lepidoptera
- Family: Crambidae
- Genus: Cataclysta
- Species: C. aclistalis

Binomial name
- Cataclysta aclistalis Dyar, 1914

Species of moth

Cataclysta aclistalis is a species of moth in the family Crambidae. It was described by Harrison Gray Dyar Jr. in 1914 and is found in Panama.
