= Cataclysta quintula =

Scientific classification
- Kingdom: Animalia
- Phylum: Arthropoda
- Class: Insecta
- Order: Lepidoptera
- Family: Crambidae
- Genus: Cataclysta
- Species: C. quintula

Binomial name
- Cataclysta quintula (Meyrick, 1938)

Synonyms
- Pycnarmon quintula Meyrick, 1938

Species of moth

Cataclysta quintula is a Crambidae species in the genus Cataclysta. It was described by Edward Meyrick in 1938, and is known from Java in Indonesia.
