= Margarosticha leucozonalis =

Scientific classification
- Kingdom: Animalia
- Phylum: Arthropoda
- Class: Insecta
- Order: Lepidoptera
- Family: Crambidae
- Genus: Margarosticha
- Species: M. leucozonalis

Binomial name
- Margarosticha leucozonalis Hampson, 1897

Species of moth

Margarosticha leucozonalis is a species of moth in the family Crambidae. It was described by George Hampson in 1897. It is found on Fergusson Island in Papua New Guinea.
