= Nymphicula patnalis =

Scientific classification
- Domain: Eukaryota
- Kingdom: Animalia
- Phylum: Arthropoda
- Class: Insecta
- Order: Lepidoptera
- Family: Crambidae
- Genus: Nymphicula
- Species: N. patnalis

Binomial name
- Nymphicula patnalis (C. Felder, R. Felder & Rogenhofer, 1875)

Synonyms
- Cataclysta patnalis C. Felder, R. Felder & Rogenhofer, 1875

Species of moth

Nymphicula patnalis is a moth in the family Crambidae. It was described by Cajetan Felder, Rudolf Felder and Alois Friedrich Rogenhofer in 1875. It is found in India.
