= Margarosticha gaudialis =

Scientific classification
- Kingdom: Animalia
- Phylum: Arthropoda
- Class: Insecta
- Order: Lepidoptera
- Family: Crambidae
- Genus: Margarosticha
- Species: M. gaudialis

Binomial name
- Margarosticha gaudialis Hampson, 1917

Species of moth

Margarosticha gaudialis is a species of moth in the family Crambidae. It was described by George Hampson in 1917. It is found in Papua New Guinea.

The wingspan is about 18 mm. The forewings are fulvous orange, tinged with brown at the base. There is an oblique silvery band, edged with brown and a triangular silvery-white mark beyond the cell defined by rather diffused brown, as well as a silvery-white subterminal band. The hindwings are fulvous orange, with a pale base and a slightly sinuous silvery-white medial band.
