= Nymphicula bombayensis =

Scientific classification
- Domain: Eukaryota
- Kingdom: Animalia
- Phylum: Arthropoda
- Class: Insecta
- Order: Lepidoptera
- Family: Crambidae
- Genus: Nymphicula
- Species: N. bombayensis

Binomial name
- Nymphicula bombayensis (C. Swinhoe & Cotes, 1889)

Synonyms
- Cataclysta bombayensis Swinhoe & Cotes, 1889; Cataclysta dilucidalis (Walker, 1859)

Species of moth

Nymphicula bombayensis is a Crambidae species in the genus Nymphicula. It was described by Charles Swinhoe and Everard Charles Cotes in 1889. It is found in India.
