= Nymphicula trimacula =

Scientific classification
- Kingdom: Animalia
- Phylum: Arthropoda
- Class: Insecta
- Order: Lepidoptera
- Family: Crambidae
- Genus: Nymphicula
- Species: N. trimacula

Binomial name
- Nymphicula trimacula (Hampson, 1891)

Synonyms
- Cataclysta trimacula Hampson, 1891

Species of moth

Nymphicula trimacula is a moth in the family Crambidae. It was described by George Hampson in 1891. It is found in India's Nilgiris District.
