= Margarosticha bimaculalis =

Scientific classification
- Kingdom: Animalia
- Phylum: Arthropoda
- Class: Insecta
- Order: Lepidoptera
- Family: Crambidae
- Genus: Margarosticha
- Species: M. bimaculalis

Binomial name
- Margarosticha bimaculalis Snellen, 1880

Species of moth

Margarosticha bimaculalis is a species of moth in the family Crambidae. It was described by Snellen in 1880. It is found on Sulawesi.
