= Nymphicula edwardsi =

Scientific classification
- Domain: Eukaryota
- Kingdom: Animalia
- Phylum: Arthropoda
- Class: Insecta
- Order: Lepidoptera
- Family: Crambidae
- Genus: Nymphicula
- Species: N. edwardsi

Binomial name
- Nymphicula edwardsi Agassiz, 2014

Species of moth

Nymphicula edwardsi is a moth in the family Crambidae. It was described by David John Lawrence Agassiz in 2014. It is found in Australia, where it has been recorded from Queensland.

The wingspan is about 14 mm.

== Etymology ==
The species is named in honour of Ted Edwards, a lepidopterist at the Australian National Insect Collection.
