= Cataclysta albifulvalis =

Scientific classification
- Kingdom: Animalia
- Phylum: Arthropoda
- Class: Insecta
- Order: Lepidoptera
- Family: Crambidae
- Genus: Cataclysta
- Species: C. albifulvalis

Binomial name
- Cataclysta albifulvalis Marion, 1956

Species of moth

Cataclysta albifulvalis is a species of moth in the family Crambidae. It was described by Hubert Marion in 1956. It is found on Madagascar.
