= Cataclysta hexalitha =

Scientific classification
- Kingdom: Animalia
- Phylum: Arthropoda
- Class: Insecta
- Order: Lepidoptera
- Family: Crambidae
- Genus: Cataclysta
- Species: C. hexalitha

Binomial name
- Cataclysta hexalitha Meyrick, 1886

Species of moth

Cataclysta hexalitha is a species of moth in the family Crambidae. It was described by Edward Meyrick in 1886. It is found on Fiji.
