= Cataclysta ambahonalis =

Scientific classification
- Kingdom: Animalia
- Phylum: Arthropoda
- Class: Insecta
- Order: Lepidoptera
- Family: Crambidae
- Genus: Cataclysta
- Species: C. ambahonalis

Binomial name
- Cataclysta ambahonalis (Marion, 1954)

Synonyms
- Argyractis ambahonalis Marion, 1954

Species of moth

Cataclysta ambahonalis is a species of moth in the family Crambidae. It was described by Hubert Marion in 1954. It is found on Madagascar.
