= Nymphicula stipalis =

Scientific classification
- Kingdom: Animalia
- Phylum: Arthropoda
- Class: Insecta
- Order: Lepidoptera
- Family: Crambidae
- Genus: Nymphicula
- Species: N. stipalis

Binomial name
- Nymphicula stipalis Snellen, 1880

Species of moth

Nymphicula stipalis is a moth in the family Crambidae. It was described by Snellen in 1880. It is found on Sumatra.
