= Nymphicula drusiusalis =

Scientific classification
- Kingdom: Animalia
- Phylum: Arthropoda
- Class: Insecta
- Order: Lepidoptera
- Family: Crambidae
- Genus: Nymphicula
- Species: N. drusiusalis

Binomial name
- Nymphicula drusiusalis (Walker, 1859)

Synonyms
- Cataclysta drusiusalis Walker, 1859

Species of moth

Nymphicula drusiusalis is a moth in the family Crambidae. It was described by Francis Walker in 1859. It is found on Borneo.
