= Cataclysta supercilialis =

Scientific classification
- Kingdom: Animalia
- Phylum: Arthropoda
- Class: Insecta
- Order: Lepidoptera
- Family: Crambidae
- Genus: Cataclysta
- Species: C. supercilialis

Binomial name
- Cataclysta supercilialis Hampson, 1897

Synonyms
- Argyractis supercilialis

Species of moth

Cataclysta supercilialis is a species of Crambidae moth in the genus Cataclysta. It was described by George Hampson in 1897 and is known from Madagascar.
