= Nymphicula concaviuscula =

Scientific classification
- Domain: Eukaryota
- Kingdom: Animalia
- Phylum: Arthropoda
- Class: Insecta
- Order: Lepidoptera
- Family: Crambidae
- Genus: Nymphicula
- Species: N. concaviuscula

Binomial name
- Nymphicula concaviuscula You, Li & Wang, 2003

Species of moth

Nymphicula concaviuscula is a moth in the family Crambidae. It was described by Ping You, Hou-Hun Li and Shu-Xia Wang in 2003. It is found in Guizhou, China.
