= Nymphicula ochrepunctalis =

Scientific classification
- Domain: Eukaryota
- Kingdom: Animalia
- Phylum: Arthropoda
- Class: Insecta
- Order: Lepidoptera
- Family: Crambidae
- Genus: Nymphicula
- Species: N. ochrepunctalis

Binomial name
- Nymphicula ochrepunctalis Agassiz, 2014

Species of moth

Nymphicula ochrepunctalis is a moth in the family Crambidae. It was described by David John Lawrence Agassiz in 2014. It is found in Papua New Guinea (the Western Province) and Australia, where it has been recorded from Queensland and the Northern Territory.

The wingspan is about 11 mm.

== Etymology ==
The species name refers to the ochreous spot in the middle of the hindwings.
