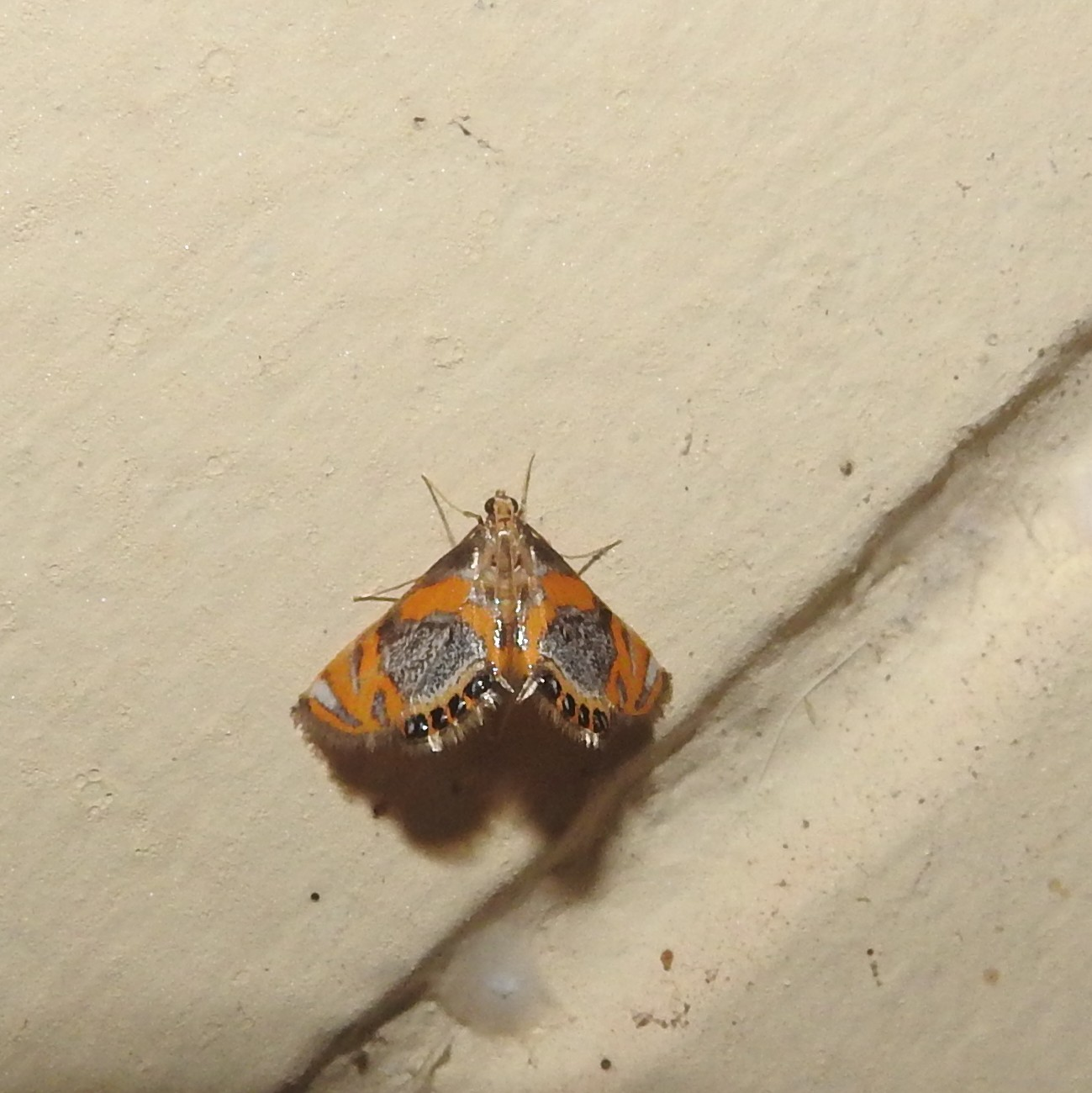

Scientific classification
- Kingdom: Animalia
- Phylum: Arthropoda
- Class: Insecta
- Order: Lepidoptera
- Family: Crambidae
- Genus: Nymphicula
- Species: N. blandialis

Binomial name
- Nymphicula blandialis (Walker, 1859)

Synonyms
- Cataclysta blandialis Walker, 1859; Cataclysta cuneifera Moore, 1885

= Nymphicula blandialis =

Species of moth

Nymphicula blandialis is a moth in the family Crambidae. It was described by Francis Walker in 1859. It is found in southern China, India, Malaysia, Sri Lanka, Taiwan, Japan, the Democratic Republic of the Congo, Ghana, Guinea, Mozambique, Nigeria, South Africa and Uganda.
