= Nymphicula luzonensis =

Scientific classification
- Domain: Eukaryota
- Kingdom: Animalia
- Phylum: Arthropoda
- Class: Insecta
- Order: Lepidoptera
- Family: Crambidae
- Genus: Nymphicula
- Species: N. luzonensis

Binomial name
- Nymphicula luzonensis Yoshiyasu, 1997

Species of moth

Nymphicula luzonensis is a moth in the family Crambidae. It was described by Yoshiyasu in 1997. It is found in the Philippines (Luzon).
