= Nymphicula nigrolunalis =

Scientific classification
- Kingdom: Animalia
- Phylum: Arthropoda
- Clade: Pancrustacea
- Class: Insecta
- Order: Lepidoptera
- Family: Crambidae
- Genus: Nymphicula
- Species: N. nigrolunalis

Binomial name
- Nymphicula nigrolunalis Speidel, 1998

Species of moth

Nymphicula nigrolunalis is a moth in the family Crambidae. It was described by Speidel in 1998. It is found in the Philippines (Leyte).
