= Nymphicula queenslandica =

Scientific classification
- Kingdom: Animalia
- Phylum: Arthropoda
- Clade: Pancrustacea
- Class: Insecta
- Order: Lepidoptera
- Family: Crambidae
- Genus: Nymphicula
- Species: N. queenslandica

Binomial name
- Nymphicula queenslandica (Hampson, 1917)

Synonyms
- Cataclysta queenslandica Hampson, 1917

Species of moth

Nymphicula queenslandica is a moth in the family Crambidae. It was described by George Hampson in 1917. It is found in Australia, where it has been recorded from Queensland.

The wingspan is 13–15 mm.

The larvae are aquatic.
