= Nymphicula zambalensis =

Scientific classification
- Kingdom: Animalia
- Phylum: Arthropoda
- Clade: Pancrustacea
- Class: Insecta
- Order: Lepidoptera
- Family: Crambidae
- Genus: Nymphicula
- Species: N. zambalensis

Binomial name
- Nymphicula zambalensis Speidel, 2003

Species of moth

Nymphicula zambalensis is a moth in the family Crambidae. It was described by Speidel in 2003. It was found in the Philippines (Luzon).
