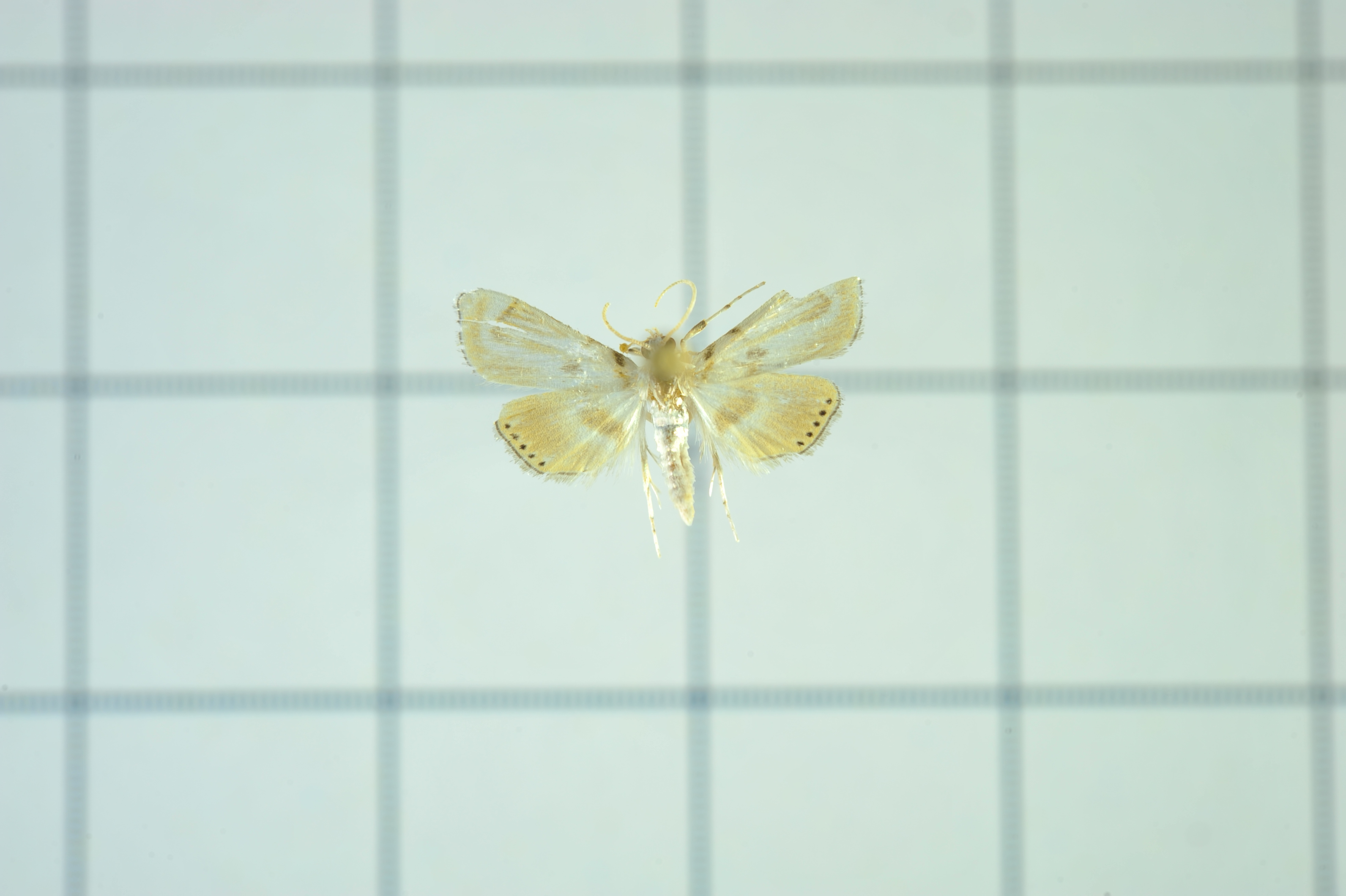

Scientific classification
- Domain: Eukaryota
- Kingdom: Animalia
- Phylum: Arthropoda
- Class: Insecta
- Order: Lepidoptera
- Family: Crambidae
- Genus: Cataclysta
- Species: C. angulata

Binomial name
- Cataclysta angulata Moore, 1885

= Cataclysta angulata =

Species of moth

Cataclysta angulata is a Crambidae species in the genus Cataclysta. It was described by Frederic Moore in 1885, and is known from Sri Lanka. It is very similar to other species like Cataclysta polyrrapha, and Cataclysta melanolitha.
