= Nymphicula adelphalis =

Scientific classification
- Domain: Eukaryota
- Kingdom: Animalia
- Phylum: Arthropoda
- Class: Insecta
- Order: Lepidoptera
- Family: Crambidae
- Genus: Nymphicula
- Species: N. adelphalis

Binomial name
- Nymphicula adelphalis Agassiz, 2014

Species of moth

Nymphicula adelphalis is a moth in the family Crambidae. It was described by David John Lawrence Agassiz in 2014. It is found in Australia, where it has been recorded from the Northern Territory.

The wingspan is about 14 mm.

== Etymology ==
The species name refers to the close relationship with other species and is derived from the Greek word for brother.
