= Nymphicula acuminatalis =

Scientific classification
- Kingdom: Animalia
- Phylum: Arthropoda
- Class: Insecta
- Order: Lepidoptera
- Family: Crambidae
- Genus: Nymphicula
- Species: N. acuminatalis

Binomial name
- Nymphicula acuminatalis Snellen, 1880

Species of moth

Nymphicula acuminatalis is a moth in the family Crambidae. It was described by Snellen in 1880. It is found on Sulawesi.
