= Cataclysta pusillalis =

Scientific classification
- Kingdom: Animalia
- Phylum: Arthropoda
- Clade: Pancrustacea
- Class: Insecta
- Order: Lepidoptera
- Family: Crambidae
- Genus: Cataclysta
- Species: C. pusillalis

Binomial name
- Cataclysta pusillalis Saalmüller, 1880

Species of moth

Cataclysta pusillalis is a Crambidae moth species in the genus Cataclysta. It was described by Saalmüller, in 1880, and is known from Madagascar.

This species has a wingspan of 11 mm.
