= Nymphicula hexaxantha =

Scientific classification
- Kingdom: Animalia
- Phylum: Arthropoda
- Class: Insecta
- Order: Lepidoptera
- Family: Crambidae
- Genus: Nymphicula
- Species: N. hexaxantha

Binomial name
- Nymphicula hexaxantha Agassiz, 2012

Species of moth

Nymphicula hexaxantha is a moth in the family Crambidae. It was described by David John Lawrence Agassiz in 2012. It is found in the Republic of the Congo, Kenya, Malawi, South Africa, Tanzania, Uganda, Zambia and Zimbabwe.

The wingspan is 10–12 mm.

== Etymology ==
The species name refers to the bold ochreous markings of the forewing.
