= Nymphicula lifuensis =

Scientific classification
- Domain: Eukaryota
- Kingdom: Animalia
- Phylum: Arthropoda
- Class: Insecta
- Order: Lepidoptera
- Family: Crambidae
- Genus: Nymphicula
- Species: N. lifuensis

Binomial name
- Nymphicula lifuensis Agassiz, 2014

Species of moth

Nymphicula lifuensis is a moth in the family Crambidae. It was described by David John Lawrence Agassiz in 2014. It is found on the Loyalty Islands east of Australia.

The wingspan is about 14 mm.

== Etymology ==
The species name refers to the island of Lifou, where the species was collected.
