= Nymphicula nigristriata =

Scientific classification
- Kingdom: Animalia
- Phylum: Arthropoda
- Class: Insecta
- Order: Lepidoptera
- Family: Crambidae
- Genus: Nymphicula
- Species: N. nigristriata

Binomial name
- Nymphicula nigristriata (Hampson, 1917)

Synonyms
- Cataclysta nigristriata Hampson, 1917

Species of moth

Nymphicula nigristriata is a moth in the family Crambidae. It was described by George Hampson in 1917. It is found on New Guinea and in the Solomon Islands.

The wingspan is 11–14 mm.
