= Nymphicula fionae =

Scientific classification
- Domain: Eukaryota
- Kingdom: Animalia
- Phylum: Arthropoda
- Class: Insecta
- Order: Lepidoptera
- Family: Crambidae
- Genus: Nymphicula
- Species: N. fionae

Binomial name
- Nymphicula fionae Agassiz, 2014

Species of moth

Nymphicula fionae is a moth in the family Crambidae. It was described by David John Lawrence Agassiz in 2014. It is found on Rossel Island in Papua New Guinea.

The wingspan is about 12.5 mm.

== Etymology ==
The species is named for the former wife of the author.
