= Nymphicula irianalis =

Scientific classification
- Domain: Eukaryota
- Kingdom: Animalia
- Phylum: Arthropoda
- Class: Insecta
- Order: Lepidoptera
- Family: Crambidae
- Genus: Nymphicula
- Species: N. irianalis

Binomial name
- Nymphicula irianalis Agassiz, 2014

Species of moth

Nymphicula irianalis is a moth in the family Crambidae. It was described by David John Lawrence Agassiz in 2014. It is found in western New Guinea (Irian Jaya).

The wingspan is about 13 mm.

== Etymology ==
The species name refers to the type locality in Irian Jaya.
