= Margarosticha pulcherrimalis =

Scientific classification
- Kingdom: Animalia
- Phylum: Arthropoda
- Class: Insecta
- Order: Lepidoptera
- Family: Crambidae
- Genus: Margarosticha
- Species: M. pulcherrimalis

Binomial name
- Margarosticha pulcherrimalis Lederer, 1863

Species of insect

Margarosticha pulcherrimalis is a species of moth in the family Crambidae. It was described by Julius Lederer in 1863. It is found on the Moluccas and Sumatra.
