= Margarosticha sphenotis =

Scientific classification
- Kingdom: Animalia
- Phylum: Arthropoda
- Class: Insecta
- Order: Lepidoptera
- Family: Crambidae
- Genus: Margarosticha
- Species: M. sphenotis

Binomial name
- Margarosticha sphenotis Meyrick, 1887

Species of moth

Margarosticha sphenotis is a species of moth in the family Crambidae. It was described by Edward Meyrick in 1887. It is found in Australia, where it has been recorded from New South Wales, Queensland and the Northern Territory.
