= Nymphicula samoensis =

Scientific classification
- Domain: Eukaryota
- Kingdom: Animalia
- Phylum: Arthropoda
- Class: Insecta
- Order: Lepidoptera
- Family: Crambidae
- Genus: Nymphicula
- Species: N. samoensis

Binomial name
- Nymphicula samoensis Agassiz, 2014

Synonyms
- Cataclysta dialitha Tams, 1935 (preocc.)

Species of moth

Nymphicula samoensis is a moth in the family Crambidae. It was described by David John Lawrence Agassiz in 2014. It is found on Samoa.
