= Cataclysta melanolitha =

Scientific classification
- Domain: Eukaryota
- Kingdom: Animalia
- Phylum: Arthropoda
- Class: Insecta
- Order: Lepidoptera
- Family: Crambidae
- Genus: Cataclysta
- Species: C. melanolitha

Binomial name
- Cataclysta melanolitha (Turner, 1908)

Synonyms
- Eristena melanolitha Turner, 1908

Species of moth

Cataclysta melanolitha is a Crambidae species in the genus Cataclysta. It was described by Turner in 1908, and is known from Australia.
