= Nymphicula hampsoni =

Scientific classification
- Domain: Eukaryota
- Kingdom: Animalia
- Phylum: Arthropoda
- Class: Insecta
- Order: Lepidoptera
- Family: Crambidae
- Genus: Nymphicula
- Species: N. hampsoni

Binomial name
- Nymphicula hampsoni Agassiz, 2014

Species of moth

Nymphicula hampsoni is a moth in the family Crambidae. It was described by David John Lawrence Agassiz in 2014. It is found in Australia, where it has been recorded from Queensland.

The wingspan is 15–16 mm.

== Etymology ==
The species is named in honour of Sir George Hampson.
