= Nymphicula mesorphna =

Scientific classification
- Domain: Eukaryota
- Kingdom: Animalia
- Phylum: Arthropoda
- Class: Insecta
- Order: Lepidoptera
- Family: Crambidae
- Genus: Nymphicula
- Species: N. mesorphna

Binomial name
- Nymphicula mesorphna (Meyrick, 1894)

Synonyms
- Cataclysta mesorphna Meyrick, 1894; Nymphicula minuta Yoshiyasu, 1980

Species of moth

Nymphicula mesorphna is a moth in the family Crambidae. It was described by Edward Meyrick in 1894. It is found in Myanmar, Japan and Taiwan.

The length of the forewings is 4.9-5.3 mm for males and 5.5-5.6 mm for females.
