= Nymphicula manilensis =

Scientific classification
- Domain: Eukaryota
- Kingdom: Animalia
- Phylum: Arthropoda
- Class: Insecta
- Order: Lepidoptera
- Family: Crambidae
- Genus: Nymphicula
- Species: N. manilensis

Binomial name
- Nymphicula manilensis Sauber in Semper, 1899

Species of moth

Nymphicula manilensis is a moth in the family Crambidae. It was described by Sauber in 1899. It is found on Luzon in the Philippines.
