= Nymphicula lactealis =

Scientific classification
- Domain: Eukaryota
- Kingdom: Animalia
- Phylum: Arthropoda
- Class: Insecta
- Order: Lepidoptera
- Family: Crambidae
- Genus: Nymphicula
- Species: N. lactealis

Binomial name
- Nymphicula lactealis Agassiz, 2014

Species of moth

Nymphicula lactealis is a moth in the family Crambidae. It was described by David John Lawrence Agassiz in 2014. It is found in New Caledonia east of Australia.

The wingspan is 13–14 mm.

== Etymology ==
The species name refers to the milky coloration of the subterminal area of the hindwings.
