= Cataclysta amboinalis =

Scientific classification
- Kingdom: Animalia
- Phylum: Arthropoda
- Class: Insecta
- Order: Lepidoptera
- Family: Crambidae
- Genus: Cataclysta
- Species: C. amboinalis

Binomial name
- Cataclysta amboinalis Marion, 1917

Species of moth

Cataclysta amboinalis is a species of moth in the family Crambidae. It was described by Hubert Marion in 1917. It is found on Ambon Island.
