= Nymphicula torresalis =

Scientific classification
- Domain: Eukaryota
- Kingdom: Animalia
- Phylum: Arthropoda
- Class: Insecta
- Order: Lepidoptera
- Family: Crambidae
- Genus: Nymphicula
- Species: N. torresalis

Binomial name
- Nymphicula torresalis Agassiz, 2014

Species of moth

Nymphicula torresalis is a moth in the family Crambidae. It was described by David John Lawrence Agassiz in 2014. It is found in Papua New Guinea and Australia, where it has been recorded from Queensland.

The wingspan is 12–13 mm.

== Etymology ==
The species name refers to the Torres Straits.
