= Margarosticha plumbealis =

Scientific classification
- Kingdom: Animalia
- Phylum: Arthropoda
- Class: Insecta
- Order: Lepidoptera
- Family: Crambidae
- Genus: Margarosticha
- Species: M. plumbealis

Binomial name
- Margarosticha plumbealis Kenrick, 1912

Species of moth

Margarosticha plumbealis is a species of moth in the family Crambidae. It was described by George Hamilton Kenrick in 1912. It is found on New Guinea.
