= Margarosticha nigrescens =

Scientific classification
- Kingdom: Animalia
- Phylum: Arthropoda
- Clade: Pancrustacea
- Class: Insecta
- Order: Lepidoptera
- Family: Crambidae
- Genus: Margarosticha
- Species: M. nigrescens

Binomial name
- Margarosticha nigrescens Speidel, 2003

Species of moth

Margarosticha nigrescens is a species of moth in the family Crambidae. It was described by Speidel in 2003. It is found in Philippines (Samar).
