= Nymphicula submarginalis =

Scientific classification
- Domain: Eukaryota
- Kingdom: Animalia
- Phylum: Arthropoda
- Class: Insecta
- Order: Lepidoptera
- Family: Crambidae
- Genus: Nymphicula
- Species: N. submarginalis

Binomial name
- Nymphicula submarginalis Agassiz, 2014

Species of moth

Nymphicula submarginalis is a moth in the family Crambidae. It was described by David John Lawrence Agassiz in 2014. It is found in Papua New Guinea, where it has been recorded from the Western and Southern highlands.

The wingspan is about 12 mm.

== Etymology ==
The species name refers to the subterminal markings on the hindwings.
