= Nymphicula mindorensis =

Scientific classification
- Kingdom: Animalia
- Phylum: Arthropoda
- Clade: Pancrustacea
- Class: Insecta
- Order: Lepidoptera
- Family: Crambidae
- Genus: Nymphicula
- Species: N. mindorensis

Binomial name
- Nymphicula mindorensis Speidel, 2003

Species of moth

Nymphicula mindorensis is a moth in the family Crambidae. It was described by Speidel in 2003. It is found in the Philippines (Mindoro).
