= Margarosticha repetitalis =

Scientific classification
- Kingdom: Animalia
- Phylum: Arthropoda
- Class: Insecta
- Order: Lepidoptera
- Family: Crambidae
- Genus: Margarosticha
- Species: M. repetitalis

Binomial name
- Margarosticha repetitalis (Warren, 1896)

Synonyms
- Cataclysta repetitalis Warren, 1896; Strepsinoma repetitalis

Species of moth

Margarosticha repetitalis is a species of moth in the family Crambidae. It was first described by Warren in 1896.

== Distribution ==
It is found in Australia, where its distribution has been recorded as spanning from Queensland and Western Australia.
