= Cataclysta marginipuncta =

Scientific classification
- Kingdom: Animalia
- Phylum: Arthropoda
- Clade: Pancrustacea
- Class: Insecta
- Order: Lepidoptera
- Family: Crambidae
- Genus: Cataclysta
- Species: C. marginipuncta

Binomial name
- Cataclysta marginipuncta Turner, 1937

Species of moth

Cataclysta marginipuncta is a Crambidae species in the genus Cataclysta. It was described by Turner in 1937. It is found in Queensland in Australia.

Adults have a broad pattern of shades of brown on their wings. There is an arc of black spots along the margin of each hindwing.
