= Nymphicula xanthobathra =

Scientific classification
- Kingdom: Animalia
- Phylum: Arthropoda
- Class: Insecta
- Order: Lepidoptera
- Family: Crambidae
- Genus: Nymphicula
- Species: N. xanthobathra

Binomial name
- Nymphicula xanthobathra (Meyrick, 1894)

Synonyms
- Anydraula xanthobathra Meyrick, 1894

Species of moth

Nymphicula xanthobathra is a moth in the family Crambidae. It was described by Edward Meyrick in 1894. It is found on Borneo.
