= Margarosticha aurantifusa =

Scientific classification
- Kingdom: Animalia
- Phylum: Arthropoda
- Class: Insecta
- Order: Lepidoptera
- Family: Crambidae
- Genus: Margarosticha
- Species: M. aurantifusa

Binomial name
- Margarosticha aurantifusa Munroe, 1959

Species of moth

Margarosticha aurantifusa is a species of moth in the family Crambidae. It was described by Eugene G. Munroe in 1959. It is found on New Guinea.
