= Margarosticha euprepialis =

Scientific classification
- Kingdom: Animalia
- Phylum: Arthropoda
- Class: Insecta
- Order: Lepidoptera
- Family: Crambidae
- Genus: Margarosticha
- Species: M. euprepialis

Binomial name
- Margarosticha euprepialis Hampson, 1917

Species of moth

Margarosticha euprepialis is a species of moth in the family Crambidae. It was described by George Hampson in 1917. It is found in Australia, where it has been recorded from Queensland, Western Australia and the Northern Territory.
