= Nymphicula samarensis =

Scientific classification
- Kingdom: Animalia
- Phylum: Arthropoda
- Clade: Pancrustacea
- Class: Insecta
- Order: Lepidoptera
- Family: Crambidae
- Genus: Nymphicula
- Species: N. samarensis

Binomial name
- Nymphicula samarensis Speidel, 2003

Species of moth

Nymphicula samarensis is a moth in the family Crambidae. It was described by Speidel in 2003. It is found in the Philippines (Samar).
