= Nymphicula tripunctata =

Scientific classification
- Domain: Eukaryota
- Kingdom: Animalia
- Phylum: Arthropoda
- Class: Insecta
- Order: Lepidoptera
- Family: Crambidae
- Genus: Nymphicula
- Species: N. tripunctata

Binomial name
- Nymphicula tripunctata Yoshiyasu, 1987

Species of moth

Nymphicula tripunctata is a moth in the family Crambidae. It was described by Yoshiyasu in 1987. It is found in Thailand.
