= Nymphicula atriterminalis =

Scientific classification
- Kingdom: Animalia
- Phylum: Arthropoda
- Class: Insecta
- Order: Lepidoptera
- Family: Crambidae
- Genus: Nymphicula
- Species: N. atriterminalis

Binomial name
- Nymphicula atriterminalis (Hampson, 1917)

Synonyms
- Cataclysta atriterminalis Hampson, 1917

Species of moth

Nymphicula atriterminalis is a moth in the family Crambidae. It was described by George Hampson in 1917. It is found on Sulawesi in Indonesia.
