= Nymphicula silauensis =

Scientific classification
- Kingdom: Animalia
- Phylum: Arthropoda
- Clade: Pancrustacea
- Class: Insecta
- Order: Lepidoptera
- Family: Crambidae
- Genus: Nymphicula
- Species: N. silauensis

Binomial name
- Nymphicula silauensis Mey, 2009

Species of moth

Nymphicula silauensis is a moth in the family Crambidae. It was described by Wolfram Mey in 2009. It is found on Borneo.
