= Nymphicula albibasalis =

Scientific classification
- Domain: Eukaryota
- Kingdom: Animalia
- Phylum: Arthropoda
- Class: Insecta
- Order: Lepidoptera
- Family: Crambidae
- Genus: Nymphicula
- Species: N. albibasalis

Binomial name
- Nymphicula albibasalis Yoshiyasu, 1980

Species of moth

Nymphicula albibasalis is a moth in the family Crambidae. It was described by Yoshiyasu in 1980. It is found in Japan (Kyushu, Shikoku).

The length of the forewings is 5.5 mm for males and 5.3-6.3 mm for females. The forewings are pale orange. Hindwings is white and fuscous.
