= Cataclysta albipunctalis =

Scientific classification
- Kingdom: Animalia
- Phylum: Arthropoda
- Class: Insecta
- Order: Lepidoptera
- Family: Crambidae
- Genus: Cataclysta
- Species: C. albipunctalis

Binomial name
- Cataclysta albipunctalis Hampson, 1897

Synonyms
- Argyractis albipunctalis

Species of moth

Cataclysta albipunctalis is a Crambidae moth species in the genus Cataclysta. It was described by George Hampson in 1897 and is known from Madagascar.
