= Nymphicula cheesmanae =

Scientific classification
- Domain: Eukaryota
- Kingdom: Animalia
- Phylum: Arthropoda
- Class: Insecta
- Order: Lepidoptera
- Family: Crambidae
- Genus: Nymphicula
- Species: N. cheesmanae

Binomial name
- Nymphicula cheesmanae Agassiz, 2014

Species of moth

Nymphicula cheesmanae is a moth in the family Crambidae. It was described by David John Lawrence Agassiz in 2014. It is found on the New Hebrides.

== Description ==
The wingspan is 10–12 mm.

== Etymology ==
The species is named for Evelyn Cheesman.
