= Cataclysta polystictalis =

Scientific classification
- Kingdom: Animalia
- Phylum: Arthropoda
- Class: Insecta
- Order: Lepidoptera
- Family: Crambidae
- Genus: Cataclysta
- Species: C. polystictalis

Binomial name
- Cataclysta polystictalis (Hampson, 1906)

Synonyms
- Nymphula polystictalis Hampson, 1906

Species of moth

Cataclysta polystictalis is a Crambidae species in the genus Cataclysta. It was described by George Hampson in 1906 and is known from New Guinea.
