= Nymphicula monticola =

Scientific classification
- Domain: Eukaryota
- Kingdom: Animalia
- Phylum: Arthropoda
- Class: Insecta
- Order: Lepidoptera
- Family: Crambidae
- Genus: Nymphicula
- Species: N. monticola

Binomial name
- Nymphicula monticola Agassiz, 2014

Species of moth

Nymphicula monticola is a moth in the family Crambidae. It was described by David John Lawrence Agassiz in 2014. It is found in the highlands of New Guinea.

The wingspan is 17–18 mm.

== Etymology ==
The species name refers to the mountainous area where the species is found.
