= Cataclysta seriopunctalis =

Scientific classification
- Kingdom: Animalia
- Phylum: Arthropoda
- Class: Insecta
- Order: Lepidoptera
- Family: Crambidae
- Genus: Cataclysta
- Species: C. seriopunctalis

Binomial name
- Cataclysta seriopunctalis (Hampson, 1897)

Synonyms
- Nymphula seriopunctalis Hampson, 1897

Species of moth

Cataclysta seriopunctalis is a Crambidae species of moth in the genus Cataclysta. It was described by George Hampson in 1897 and is known from New Guinea, Amboina and Fergusson Island.
