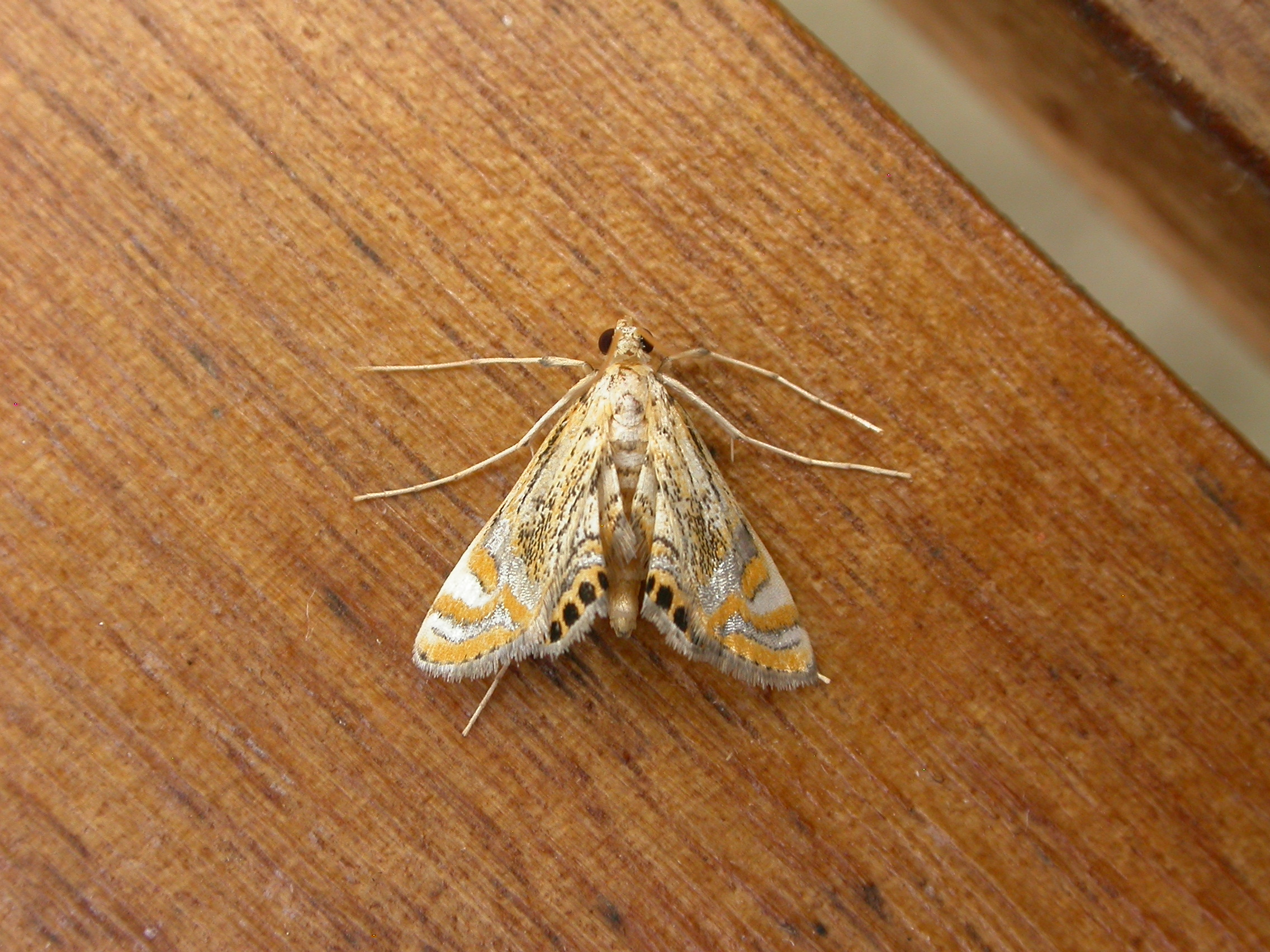

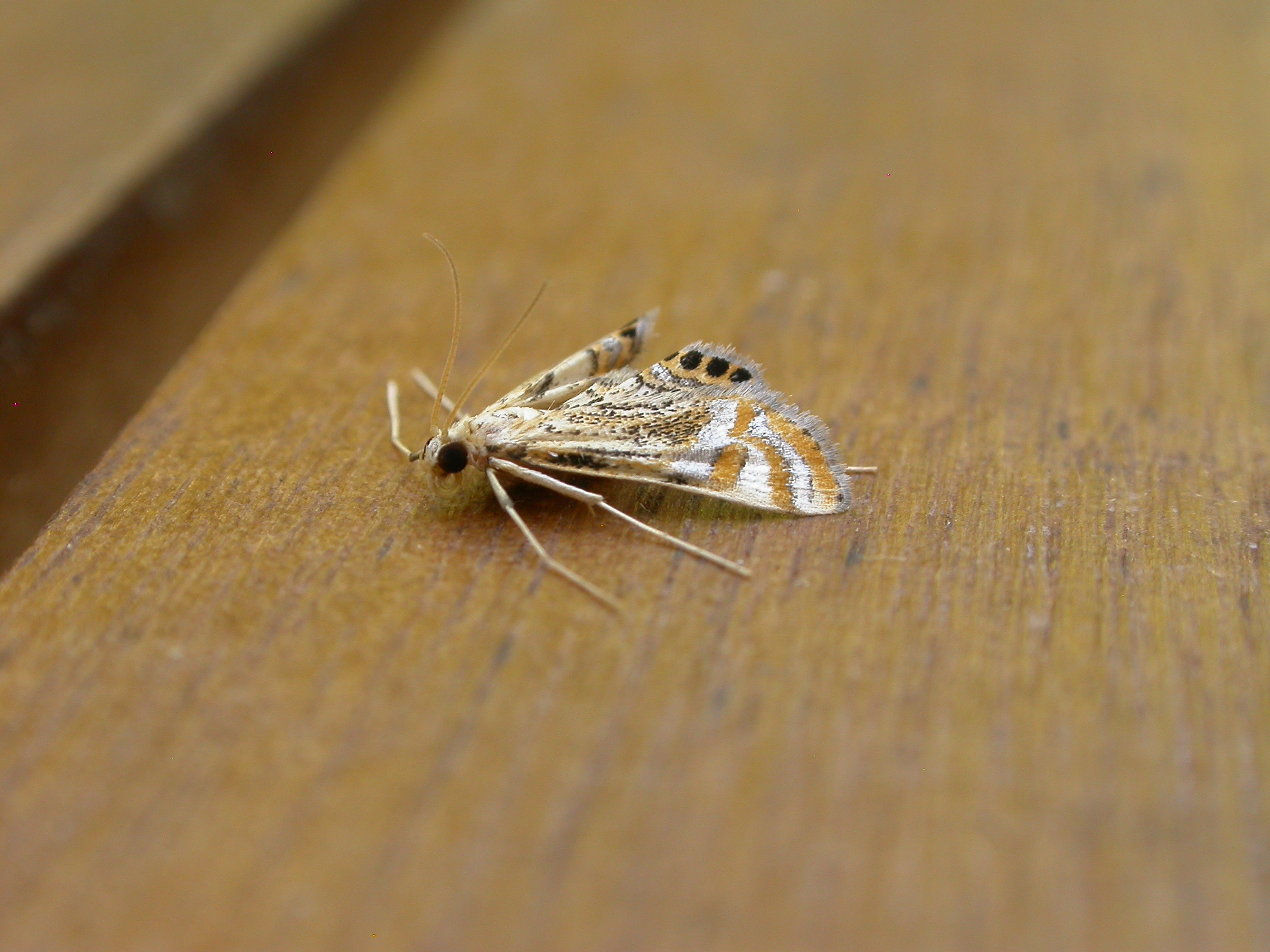

Scientific classification
- Kingdom: Animalia
- Phylum: Arthropoda
- Class: Insecta
- Order: Lepidoptera
- Family: Crambidae
- Genus: Cataclysta
- Species: C. lampetialis

Binomial name
- Cataclysta lampetialis Walker, 1859

= Cataclysta lampetialis =

Species of moth

Cataclysta lampetialis is a Crambidae species in the genus Cataclysta. It was described by Francis Walker in 1859, and is known from Australia.
