= Nymphicula conjunctalis =

Scientific classification
- Domain: Eukaryota
- Kingdom: Animalia
- Phylum: Arthropoda
- Class: Insecta
- Order: Lepidoptera
- Family: Crambidae
- Genus: Nymphicula
- Species: N. conjunctalis

Binomial name
- Nymphicula conjunctalis Agassiz, 2014

Species of moth

Nymphicula conjunctalis is a moth in the family Crambidae. It was described by David John Lawrence Agassiz in 2014. It is found in Australia, where it has been recorded from the Northern Territory.

The wingspan is about 11 mm.

== Etymology ==
The species name refers to the conjoined terminal eyespots of the hindwings.
