= Nymphicula saigusai =

Scientific classification
- Domain: Eukaryota
- Kingdom: Animalia
- Phylum: Arthropoda
- Class: Insecta
- Order: Lepidoptera
- Family: Crambidae
- Genus: Nymphicula
- Species: N. saigusai

Binomial name
- Nymphicula saigusai Yoshiyasu, 1980

Species of moth

Nymphicula saigusai is a moth in the family Crambidae. It was described by Yoshiyasu in 1980. It is found in Japan (Kyushu, Shikoku, Honshu).

The length of the forewings is 6.2 mm for males and 6.5 mm for females.
