= Margarosticha argyrograpta =

Scientific classification
- Kingdom: Animalia
- Phylum: Arthropoda
- Class: Insecta
- Order: Lepidoptera
- Family: Crambidae
- Genus: Margarosticha
- Species: M. argyrograpta

Binomial name
- Margarosticha argyrograpta Hampson, 1917

Species of moth

Margarosticha argyrograpta is a species of moth in the family Crambidae. It was described by George Hampson in 1917. It is found on the Bismarck Archipelago.

The wingspan is 18–22 mm. The forewings are orange-yellow with a silvery-white subbasal patch, a silvery-white medial band, a triangular silvery-white postmedial patch, as well as a wedge-shaped silvery-white subterminal band. The hindwings are orange-yellow, with a white base and a silvery-white medial band, as well as a metallic silvery postmedial lunule.
