= Nymphicula beni =

Scientific classification
- Domain: Eukaryota
- Kingdom: Animalia
- Phylum: Arthropoda
- Class: Insecta
- Order: Lepidoptera
- Family: Crambidae
- Genus: Nymphicula
- Species: N. beni

Binomial name
- Nymphicula beni Agassiz, 2014

Species of moth

Nymphicula beni is a moth in the family Crambidae. It was described by David John Lawrence Agassiz in 2014. It is found in Papua New Guinea.

The wingspan is about 15 mm.

== Etymology ==
The species is named for Mr Ben Probert.
