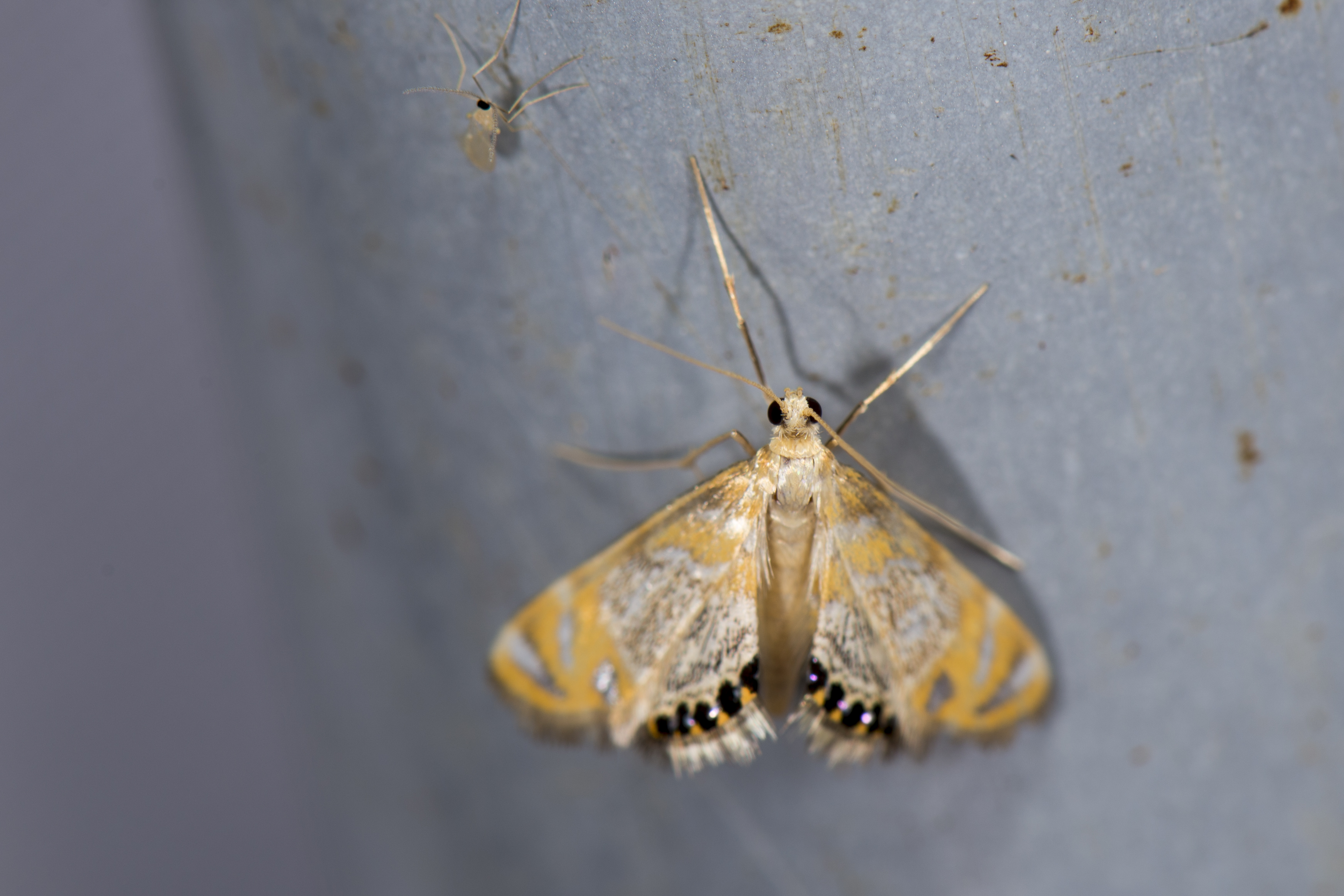
- Nymphicula yoshiyasui

Scientific classification
- Domain: Eukaryota
- Kingdom: Animalia
- Phylum: Arthropoda
- Class: Insecta
- Order: Lepidoptera
- Family: Crambidae
- Genus: Nymphicula
- Species: N. yoshiyasui

Binomial name
- Nymphicula yoshiyasui D. J. L. Agassiz, 2002

= Nymphicula yoshiyasui =

Species of moth

Nymphicula yoshiyasui is a moth in the family Crambidae. It was described by David John Lawrence Agassiz in 2002. It is found from Taiwan and Okinawa to Amami-Oshima in Japan.

The length of the forewings is 6.7 mm for males and 7.1 mm for females. Full-grown larvae reach a length of 8-10.1 mm.

== Etymology ==
The species is named in honour of Dr. Yutaka Yoshiyasu who discovered the species.
