= Nymphicula nyasalis =

Scientific classification
- Kingdom: Animalia
- Phylum: Arthropoda
- Class: Insecta
- Order: Lepidoptera
- Family: Crambidae
- Genus: Nymphicula
- Species: N. nyasalis

Binomial name
- Nymphicula nyasalis (Hampson, 1917)

Synonyms
- Cataclysta nyasalis Hampson, 1917

Species of moth

Nymphicula nyasalis is a species of moth of the family Crambidae. It was described by George Hampson in 1917. It is found in the Republic of the Congo, Malawi and Tanzania.

The wingspan is 9–14 mm. The base of the forewings is fuscous. The hindwings are whitish.
