= Nymphicula callichromalis =

Scientific classification
- Kingdom: Animalia
- Phylum: Arthropoda
- Class: Insecta
- Order: Lepidoptera
- Family: Crambidae
- Genus: Nymphicula
- Species: N. callichromalis

Binomial name
- Nymphicula callichromalis (Mabille, 1879)

Synonyms
- Cataclysta callichromalis Mabille, 1879

Species of moth

Nymphicula callichromalis is a species of moth in the family Crambidae. It was described by Paul Mabille in 1879. It is found on Madagascar.
