= Eoophyla mimicalis =

Scientific classification
- Kingdom: Animalia
- Phylum: Arthropoda
- Class: Insecta
- Order: Lepidoptera
- Family: Crambidae
- Genus: Eoophyla
- Species: E. mimicalis

Binomial name
- Eoophyla mimicalis (Hampson, 1917)

Synonyms
- Argyractis mimicalis Hampson, 1917; Argyractis lithorma Meyrick, 1936; Argyractis sphragidacma Meyrick, 1937

Species of moth

Eoophyla mimicalis is a moth in the family Crambidae. It was described by George Hampson in 1917. It is found in Cameroon, the Republic of the Congo, the Democratic Republic of the Congo, Ghana, Kenya, Malawi, Nigeria, Sierra Leone, Tanzania and Uganda.

The wingspan is 13–16 mm. Adults are on wing year round.
