= Nymphicula diehlalis =

Scientific classification
- Kingdom: Animalia
- Phylum: Arthropoda
- Class: Insecta
- Order: Lepidoptera
- Family: Crambidae
- Genus: Nymphicula
- Species: N. diehlalis

Binomial name
- Nymphicula diehlalis Marion, 1956

Synonyms
- Argyrophorodes diehlalis Marion, 1956; Cataclysta diehlalis

Species of moth

Nymphicula diehlalis is a species of moth in the family Crambidae. It was described by Hubert Marion in 1956. It is found on Madagascar.
