= Nymphicula australis =

Scientific classification
- Kingdom: Animalia
- Phylum: Arthropoda
- Class: Insecta
- Order: Lepidoptera
- Family: Crambidae
- Genus: Nymphicula
- Species: N. australis

Binomial name
- Nymphicula australis (C. Felder, R. Felder & Rogenhofer, 1875)

Synonyms
- Cataclysta australis C. Felder, R. Felder & Rogenhofer, 1875; Margarosticha australis

Species of moth

Nymphicula australis is a species of moth in the family Crambidae. It was described by Cajetan Felder, Rudolf Felder and Alois Friedrich Rogenhofer in 1875. It is found on Fiji.

The wingspan is 14–16 mm.
