= Nymphicula perirrorata =

Scientific classification
- Kingdom: Animalia
- Phylum: Arthropoda
- Class: Insecta
- Order: Lepidoptera
- Family: Crambidae
- Genus: Nymphicula
- Species: N. perirrorata

Binomial name
- Nymphicula perirrorata (Hampson, 1917)

Synonyms
- Cataclysta perirrorata Hampson, 1917

Species of moth

Nymphicula perirrorata is a species of moth in the family Crambidae. It was described by George Hampson in 1917. It is found in Ghana, Ivory Coast, Malawi, Nigeria, Sierra Leone, South Africa, Sudan and Zimbabwe.

The wingspan is 9–13 mm. Adults have been recorded on wing from February to March, in May, from June to August, October and November.
