= Nymphicula argyrochrysalis =

Scientific classification
- Kingdom: Animalia
- Phylum: Arthropoda
- Class: Insecta
- Order: Lepidoptera
- Family: Crambidae
- Genus: Nymphicula
- Species: N. argyrochrysalis

Binomial name
- Nymphicula argyrochrysalis (Mabille, 1900)

Synonyms
- Cataclysta argyrochrysalis Mabille, 1900

Species of moth

Nymphicula argyrochrysalis is a species of moth in the family Crambidae. It was described by Paul Mabille in 1900. It is found on Madagascar.
