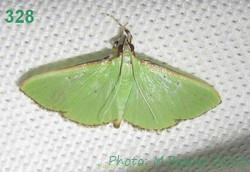

Scientific classification
- Kingdom: Animalia
- Phylum: Arthropoda
- Class: Insecta
- Order: Lepidoptera
- Family: Crambidae
- Tribe: Margaroniini
- Genus: Parotis; Hübner, 1831

Synonyms
- Cenocnemis Warren, 1896; Chloauges Lederer, 1863; Enchocnemidia Lederer, 1863; Pachyarches Lederer, 1863

= Parotis =

Genus of moths

Parotis is a genus of moths of the family Crambidae.

== Species ==
- Parotis amboinalis (Swinhoe, 1906)
- Parotis angustalis (Snellen, 1895)
- Parotis ankaratralis Marion, 1954
- Parotis arachnealis (Walker, 1859)
- Parotis athysanota (Hampson, 1912)
- Parotis atlitalis (Walker, 1859)
- Parotis baldersalis (Walker, 1859)
- Parotis bracata (E. Hering, 1901)
- Parotis brunneomarginalis (Kenrick, 1907)
- Parotis chlorochroalis (Hampson, 1912)
- Parotis confinis (Hampson, 1899)
- Parotis costulalis (Strand, 1912)
- Parotis egaealis (Walker, 1859)
- Parotis fallacialis (Snellen, 1890)
- Parotis fasciculata (Aurivillius, 1910) (from Tanzania)
- Parotis impia (Meyrick, 1934) (from Congo & Zimbabwe)
- Parotis incurvata Warren, 1896
- Parotis invernalis (de Joannis, 1927) (from Mozambique)
- Parotis laceritalis (Kenrick, 1907)
- Parotis marginata (Hampson, 1893)
- Parotis marinata (Fabricius, 1784)
- Parotis minor (Pagenstecher, 1884)
- Parotis nigroviridalis (Pagenstecher, 1888)
- Parotis ogasawarensis (Shibuya, 1929)
- Parotis pomonalis (Guenée, 1854)
- Parotis prasinalis (Saalmüller, 1880)
- Parotis prasinophila (Hampson, 1912)
- Parotis punctiferalis (Walker, 1866)
- Parotis pusillalis (Strand, 1912)
- Parotis pyritalis (Hampson, 1912)
- Parotis squamitibialis (Strand, 1912)
- Parotis squamopedalis (Guenée, 1854)
- Parotis suralis (Lederer, 1863)
- Parotis triangulalis (Strand, 1912)
- Parotis vernalis (Hampson, 1912)
- Parotis zambesalis (Walker, 1866)

== Former species ==
- Parotis tricoloralis (Pagenstecher, 1888)
- Parotis tritonalis (Snellen, 1895)
