= Parotis pusillalis =

Scientific classification
- Kingdom: Animalia
- Phylum: Arthropoda
- Class: Insecta
- Order: Lepidoptera
- Family: Crambidae
- Genus: Parotis
- Species: P. pusillalis

Binomial name
- Parotis pusillalis (Strand, 1912)

Synonyms
- Glyphodes pusillalis Strand, 1912

Species of moth

Parotis pusillalis is a moth in the family Crambidae. It was described by Strand in 1912. It is found in Cameroon.
