= Parotis triangulalis =

Scientific classification
- Kingdom: Animalia
- Phylum: Arthropoda
- Class: Insecta
- Order: Lepidoptera
- Family: Crambidae
- Genus: Parotis
- Species: P. triangulalis

Binomial name
- Parotis triangulalis (Strand, 1912)

Synonyms
- Glyphodes triangulalis Strand, 1912; Glyphodes triangulalis var. bololalis Strand, 1912; Glyphodes triangularis Strand, 1912

Species of moth

Parotis triangulalis is a moth in the family Crambidae. It was described by Strand in 1912. It is found in Cameroon and the Democratic Republic of Congo.
