= Parotis egaealis =

Scientific classification
- Kingdom: Animalia
- Phylum: Arthropoda
- Class: Insecta
- Order: Lepidoptera
- Family: Crambidae
- Genus: Parotis
- Species: P. egaealis

Binomial name
- Parotis egaealis (Walker, 1859)

Synonyms
- Margaronia egaealis Walker, 1859

Species of moth

Parotis egaealis is a moth in the family Crambidae. It was described by Francis Walker in 1859. It is found on Borneo.
