= Parotis marinata =

Scientific classification
- Kingdom: Animalia
- Phylum: Arthropoda
- Class: Insecta
- Order: Lepidoptera
- Family: Crambidae
- Genus: Parotis
- Species: P. marinata

Binomial name
- Parotis marinata (Fabricius, 1784)

Synonyms
- Diaphania marinata Fabricius, 1784; Phalaena marinata Fabricius, 1784; Margaronia maliferalis Walker, 1866; Pachyarches advena E. Hering, 1901; Parotis planalis Warren, 1896; Parotis psittacalis Hübner, 1831; Margaronia marinata Fabricius, 1784

Species of moth

Parotis marinata is a moth in the family Crambidae. It was described by Johan Christian Fabricius in 1784. It is found in India (Assam, Darjeeling), Sri Lanka, New Guinea, on the Solomon Islands, the Democratic Republic of the Congo (Orientale, Equateur), South Africa (Eastern Cape). and Australia.

The larvae feed on Rauvolfia vomitoria.
