= Parotis fasciculata =

Scientific classification
- Kingdom: Animalia
- Phylum: Arthropoda
- Class: Insecta
- Order: Lepidoptera
- Family: Crambidae
- Genus: Parotis
- Species: P. fasciculata

Binomial name
- Parotis fasciculata (Aurivillius, 1910)

Synonyms
- Glyphodes fasciculata Aurivillius, 1910

Species of moth

Parotis fasciculata is a moth in the family Crambidae. It was described by Per Olof Christopher Aurivillius in 1910. It is found in Tanzania.

== Holotype ==
The holotype of this species is illustrated on the web-pages of the Swedish Museum of Natural History
