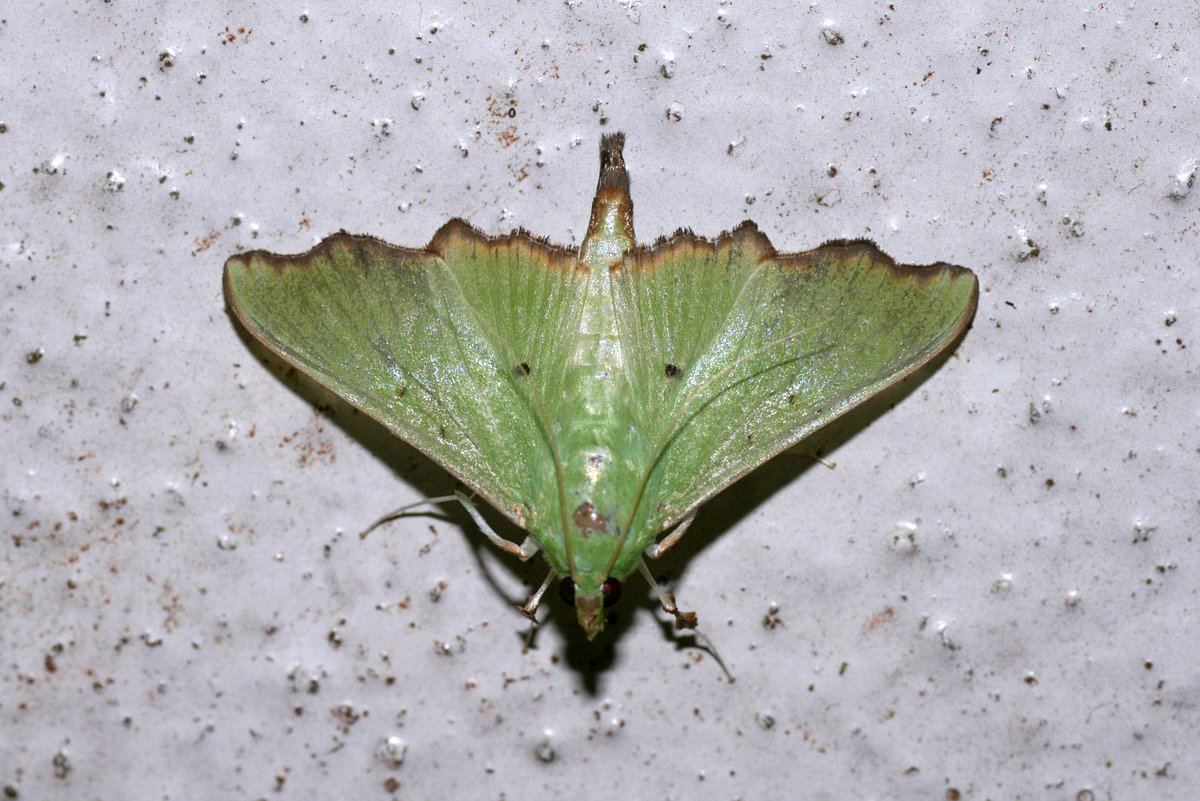

Scientific classification
- Kingdom: Animalia
- Phylum: Arthropoda
- Clade: Pancrustacea
- Class: Insecta
- Order: Lepidoptera
- Family: Crambidae
- Genus: Parotis
- Species: P. suralis

Binomial name
- Parotis suralis (Lederer, 1863)

Synonyms
- Chloauges suralis Lederer, 1863; Glyphodes suralis (Lederer, 1863); Margaronia woodfordii Butler, 1885

= Parotis suralis =

Species of moth

Parotis suralis is a moth of the family Crambidae. The species was first described by Julius Lederer in 1863. It is found around the west Pacific Rim, including the Chagos Islands, Hong Kong, Japan, Kiribati, Tuvalu and the tropical far north of Queensland.(Ps:il n'est pas toxique pour les humains)
