= Parotis punctiferalis =

Scientific classification
- Kingdom: Animalia
- Phylum: Arthropoda
- Class: Insecta
- Order: Lepidoptera
- Family: Crambidae
- Genus: Parotis
- Species: P. punctiferalis

Binomial name
- Parotis punctiferalis (Walker, 1866)

Synonyms
- Margaronia punctiferalis Walker, 1866

Species of moth

Parotis punctiferalis is a moth in the family Crambidae. It was described by Francis Walker in 1866. It is found in New Guinea, Australia and China.

The wingspan is 36–37 mm.

The larvae feed on Apocynaceae species, including Melodinus species.
