= Parotis vernalis =

Scientific classification
- Kingdom: Animalia
- Phylum: Arthropoda
- Clade: Pancrustacea
- Class: Insecta
- Order: Lepidoptera
- Family: Crambidae
- Genus: Parotis
- Species: P. vernalis

Binomial name
- Parotis vernalis (Hampson, 1912)

Synonyms
- Glyphodes vernalis Hampson, 1912

Species of moth

Parotis vernalis is a moth in the family Crambidae. It was described by George Hampson in 1912. It is found in Nigeria and South Africa.
