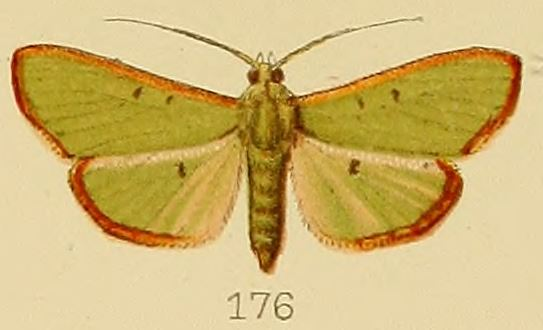
- Parotis brunneomarginalis

Scientific classification
- Kingdom: Animalia
- Phylum: Arthropoda
- Class: Insecta
- Order: Lepidoptera
- Family: Crambidae
- Genus: Parotis
- Species: P. brunneomarginalis

Binomial name
- Parotis brunneomarginalis (Kenrick, 1907)

Synonyms
- Glyphodes brunneomarginalis Kenrick, 1907

= Parotis brunneomarginalis =

Species of moth

Parotis brunneomarginalis is a species of moth of the family Crambidae. It is found in Papua New Guinea.

It has a wingspan of 32mm.
