= Parotis incurvata =

Scientific classification
- Kingdom: Animalia
- Phylum: Arthropoda
- Class: Insecta
- Order: Lepidoptera
- Family: Crambidae
- Genus: Parotis
- Species: P. incurvata

Binomial name
- Parotis incurvata (Warren, 1896)

Synonyms
- Cenocnemis incurvata Warren, 1896

Species of moth

Parotis incurvata is a moth in the family Crambidae. It was described by William Warren in 1896. It is found in Indonesia (Java), on the Loyalty Islands and in Australia, where it has been recorded from Queensland and New South Wales.
