= Parotis chlorochroalis =

Scientific classification
- Kingdom: Animalia
- Phylum: Arthropoda
- Class: Insecta
- Order: Lepidoptera
- Family: Crambidae
- Genus: Parotis
- Species: P. chlorochroalis

Binomial name
- Parotis chlorochroalis (Hampson, 1912)

Synonyms
- Glyphodes chlorochroalis Hampson, 1912; Margaronia bivincta Meyrick, 1933; Margaronia mnesiphylla Meyrick, 1934

Species of moth

Parotis chlorochroalis is a moth in the family Crambidae. It was described by George Hampson in 1912. It is found in Cameroon, the Democratic Republic of the Congo (Katanga, South Kivu, Equateur) and Nigeria.
