= Parotis squamopedalis =

Scientific classification
- Kingdom: Animalia
- Phylum: Arthropoda
- Class: Insecta
- Order: Lepidoptera
- Family: Crambidae
- Genus: Parotis
- Species: P. squamopedalis

Binomial name
- Parotis squamopedalis (Guenée, 1854)

Synonyms
- Margarodes squamopedalis Guenée, 1854

Species of moth

Parotis squamopedalis is a moth in the family Crambidae. It was described by Achille Guenée in 1854. It is found in Western Cape, South Africa.
