= Parotis zambesalis =

Scientific classification
- Kingdom: Animalia
- Phylum: Arthropoda
- Class: Insecta
- Order: Lepidoptera
- Family: Crambidae
- Genus: Parotis
- Species: P. zambesalis

Binomial name
- Parotis zambesalis (Walker, 1866)

Synonyms
- Margaronia zambesalis Walker, 1866; Glyphodes zambesialis Pagenstecher, 1907

Species of insect

Parotis zambesalis is a moth in the family Crambidae. It was described by Francis Walker in 1866. It is found in Madagascar and South Africa.
