= Parotis costulalis =

Scientific classification
- Kingdom: Animalia
- Phylum: Arthropoda
- Class: Insecta
- Order: Lepidoptera
- Family: Crambidae
- Genus: Parotis
- Species: P. costulalis

Binomial name
- Parotis costulalis (Strand, 1912)

Synonyms
- Glyphodes costulalis Strand, 1912; Glyphodes costulalis var. malagasa Strand, 1912

Species of moth

Parotis costulalis is a moth in the family Crambidae. It was described by Strand in 1912. It is found in Cameroon and Madagascar.
