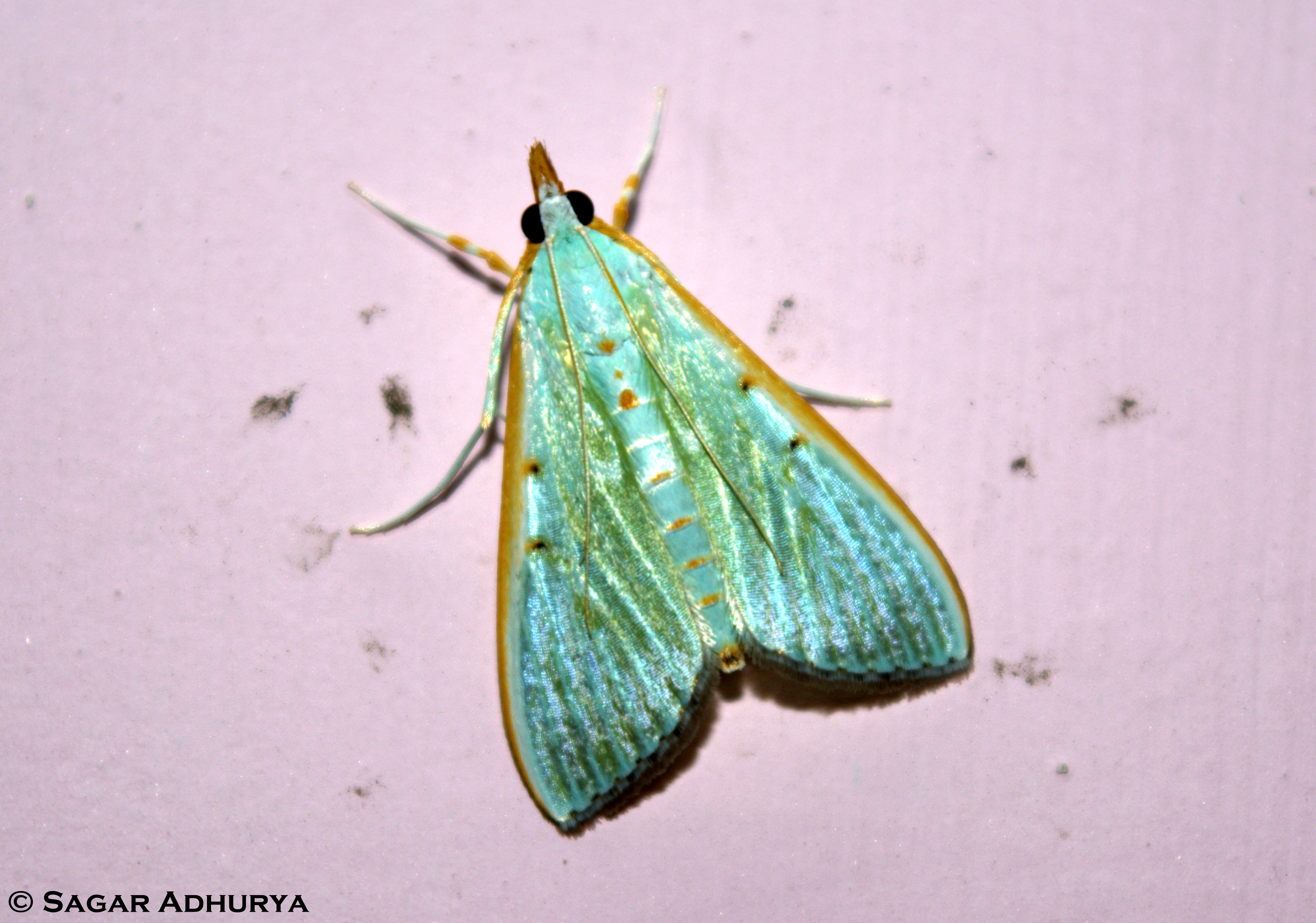

Scientific classification
- Kingdom: Animalia
- Phylum: Arthropoda
- Class: Insecta
- Order: Lepidoptera
- Family: Crambidae
- Genus: Arthroschista
- Species: A. hilaralis

Binomial name
- Arthroschista hilaralis (Walker, 1859)

Synonyms
- Margaronia hilaralis Walker, 1859; Margarodes aquosalis Snellen, [1880]

= Arthroschista hilaralis =

Kadam defoliator

Species of moth

Arthroschista hilaralis, also known as the kadam defoliator, is a moth in the family Crambidae. It was described by Francis Walker in 1859. It is found in India, Sri Lanka, Burma, Cambodia, Sumatra, Borneo and in Australia, where it has been recorded from Queensland.
