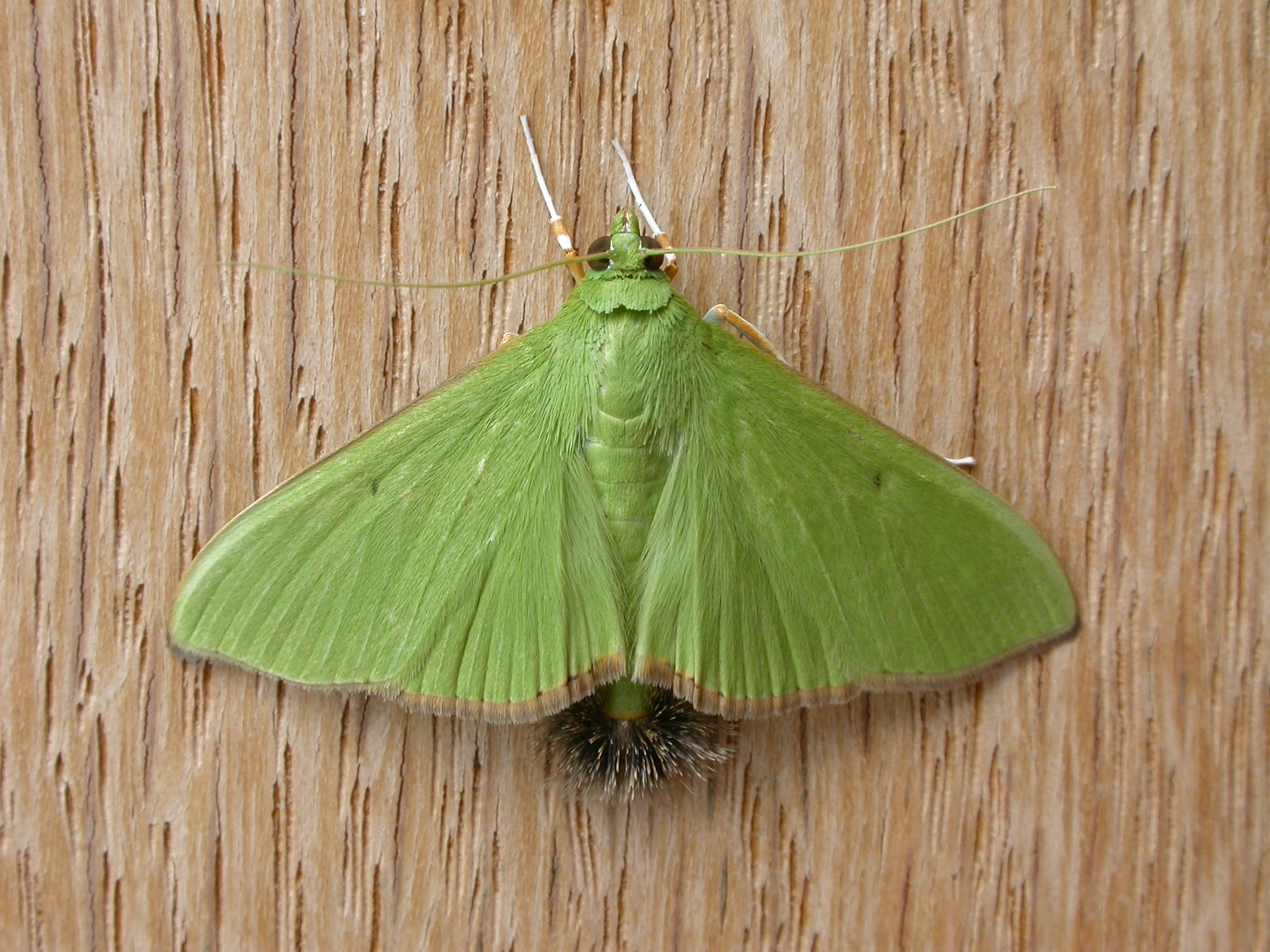

Scientific classification
- Kingdom: Animalia
- Phylum: Arthropoda
- Clade: Pancrustacea
- Class: Insecta
- Order: Lepidoptera
- Family: Crambidae
- Genus: Parotis
- Species: P. marginata

Binomial name
- Parotis marginata (Hampson, 1893)

Synonyms
- Cenocnemis marginata Hampson, 1893; Glyphodes marginata (Hampson, 1893); per Hampson, 1898: 735.

= Parotis marginata =

Species of moth

Parotis marginata is a species of moth of the family Crambidae. It is known from south-east Asia, including India, Bangladesh and China, as well as Fiji, Japan and Australia, where it is known from the Northern Territory and Queensland. It has a wingspan of 37mm (1.1/2")

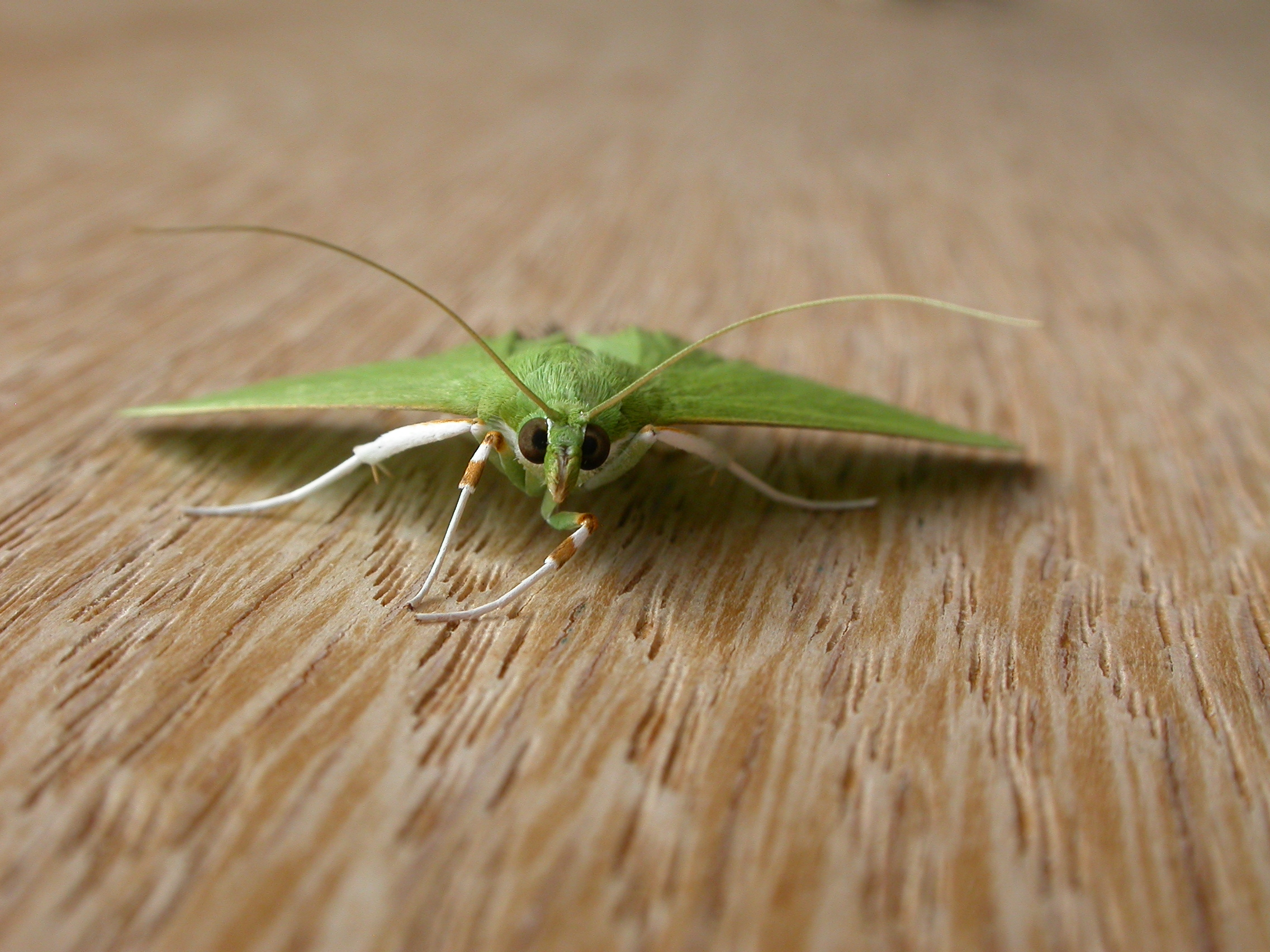

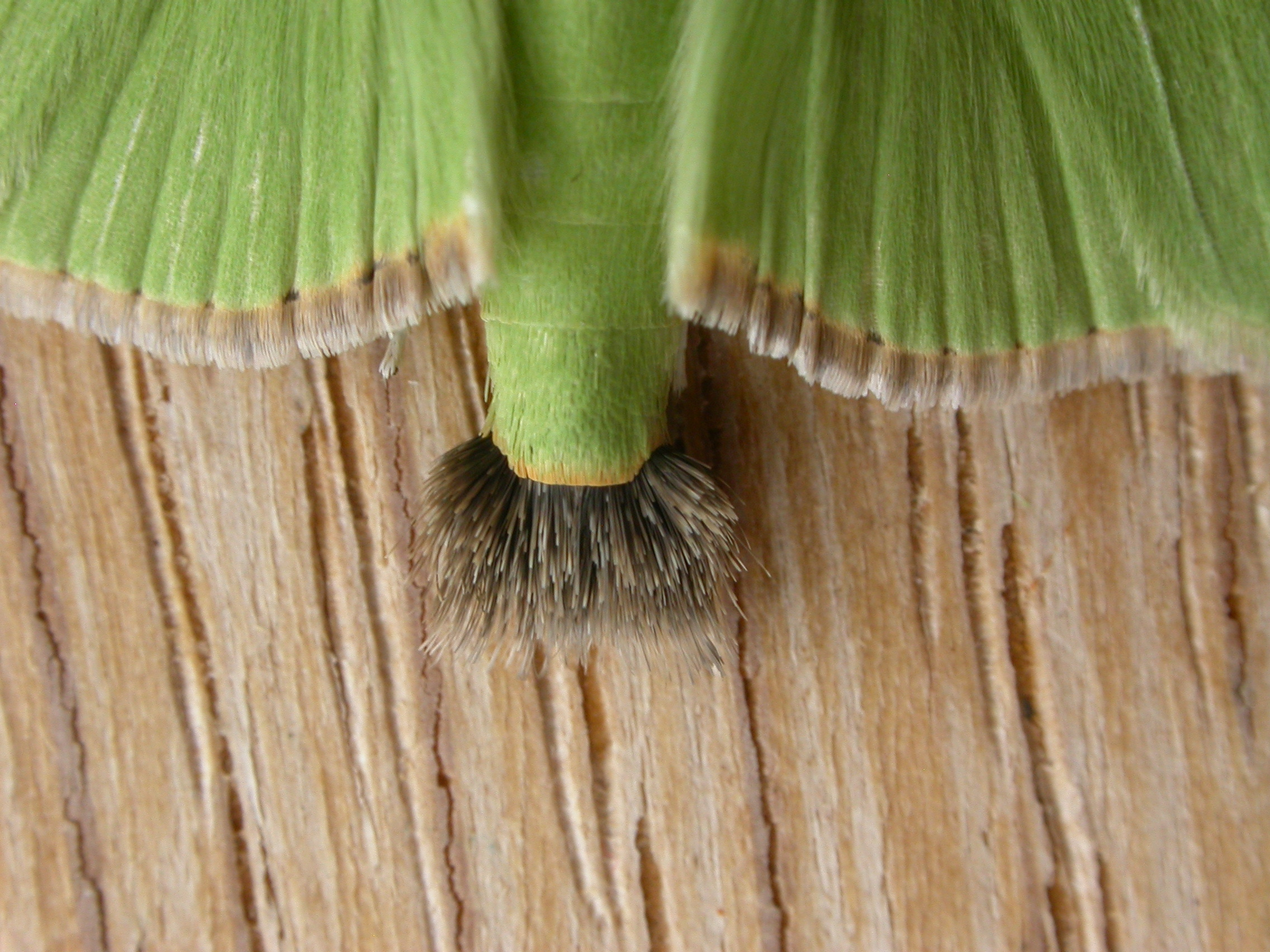

The wingspan is about 30-37 mm.
