= Parotis minor =

Scientific classification
- Kingdom: Animalia
- Phylum: Arthropoda
- Class: Insecta
- Order: Lepidoptera
- Family: Crambidae
- Genus: Parotis
- Species: P. minor

Binomial name
- Parotis minor (Pagenstecher, 1884)

Synonyms
- Margarodes minor Pagenstecher, 1884

Species of moth

Parotis minor is a moth in the family Crambidae. It was described by Pagenstecher in 1884. It is found in Indonesia (Ambon Island).
