= Parotis nigroviridalis =

Scientific classification
- Kingdom: Animalia
- Phylum: Arthropoda
- Class: Insecta
- Order: Lepidoptera
- Family: Crambidae
- Genus: Parotis
- Species: P. nigroviridalis

Binomial name
- Parotis nigroviridalis (Pagenstecher, 1888)

Synonyms
- Chloauges nigroviridalis Pagenstecher, 1888

Species of moth

Parotis nigroviridalis is a moth in the family Crambidae. It was described by Pagenstecher in 1888. It is found in Indonesia (Ambon Island).
