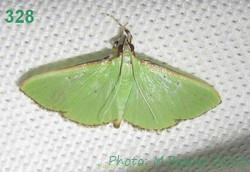

Scientific classification
- Kingdom: Animalia
- Phylum: Arthropoda
- Class: Insecta
- Order: Lepidoptera
- Family: Crambidae
- Genus: Parotis
- Species: P. ankaratralis

Binomial name
- Parotis ankaratralis (Marion, 1954)

Synonyms
- Diaphana ankaratralis Marion, 1954

= Parotis ankaratralis =

Species of moth

Parotis ankaratralis is a moth in the family Crambidae. It was described by Hubert Marion in 1954. It is found on the Comoros (Mohéli, Mayotte) and on Madagascar.
