= Parotis prasinophila =

Scientific classification
- Kingdom: Animalia
- Phylum: Arthropoda
- Class: Insecta
- Order: Lepidoptera
- Family: Crambidae
- Genus: Parotis
- Species: P. prasinophila

Binomial name
- Parotis prasinophila (Hampson, 1912)

Synonyms
- Glyphodes prasinophila Hampson, 1912

Species of moth

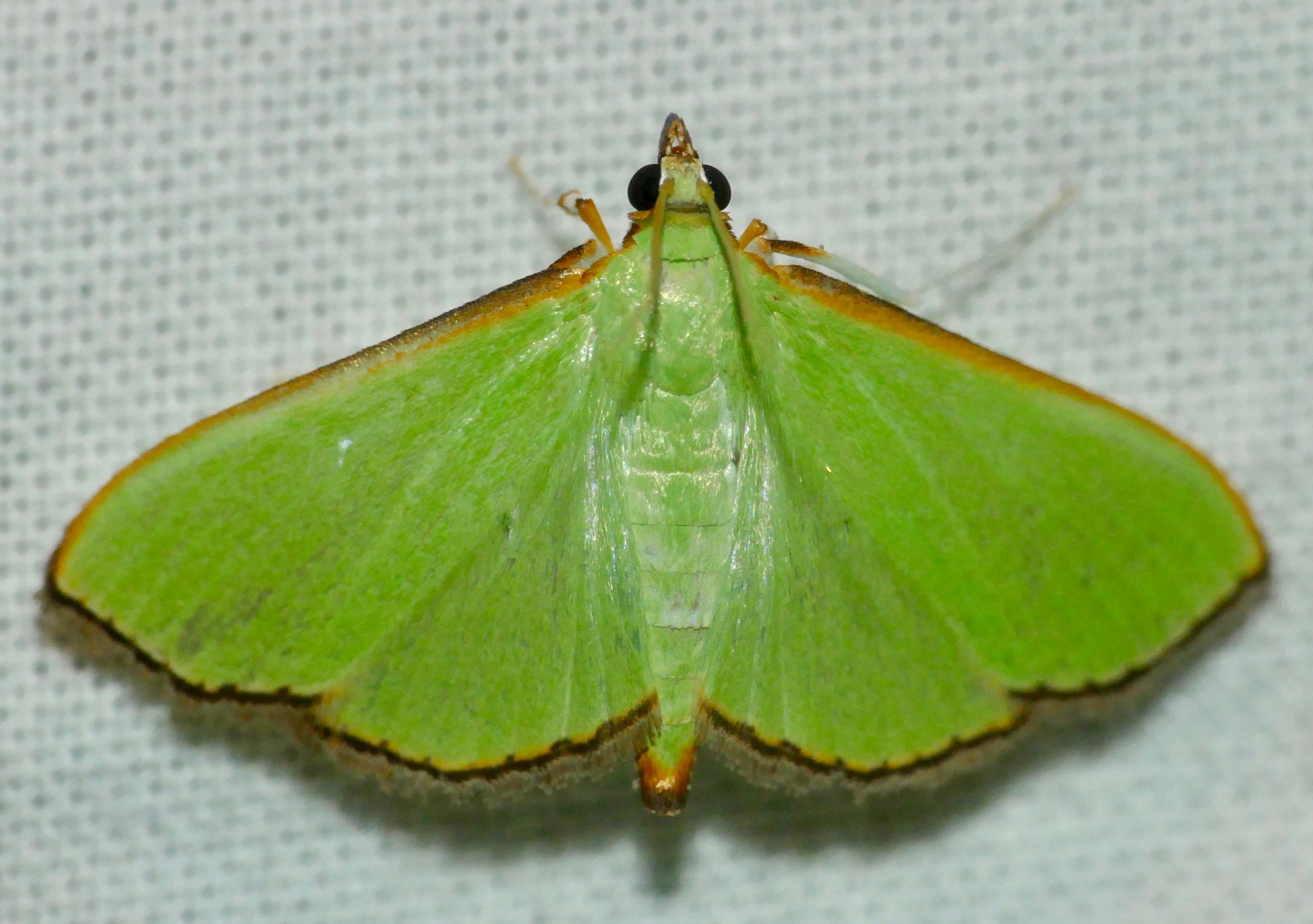
Parotis prasinophila

Parotis prasinophila is a moth in the family Crambidae. It was described by George Hampson in 1912. It is found in the Democratic Republic of the Congo (Orientale), Mozambique and South Africa.
