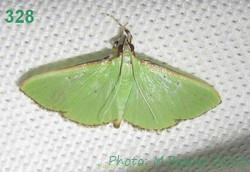
- probably Paraotis prasinalis

Scientific classification
- Kingdom: Animalia
- Phylum: Arthropoda
- Clade: Pancrustacea
- Class: Insecta
- Order: Lepidoptera
- Family: Crambidae
- Genus: Parotis
- Species: P. prasinalis

Binomial name
- Parotis prasinalis (Saalmüller, 1880)

Synonyms
- Botys prasinalis Saalmüller, 1880; Glyphodes deidoalis Strand, 1912; Parotis deidoalis (Strand, 1912); Margaronia tritonalis Snellen, 1895; Parotis trinotalis (Snellen, 1895)

= Parotis prasinalis =

Species of moth

Parotis prasinalis is a moth of the family Crambidae. It is found in Madagascar, Mozambique, Comoros, Seychelles and in Kenya.

This species has a wingspan of 17mm. The wings are clear-grassgreen with a black spot in their middle. Antennae are yellowish, with almost the length of the forewings. The edge of the forewings and palpae are grey-brown.
