= Parotis athysanota =

Scientific classification
- Kingdom: Animalia
- Phylum: Arthropoda
- Class: Insecta
- Order: Lepidoptera
- Family: Crambidae
- Genus: Parotis
- Species: P. athysanota

Binomial name
- Parotis athysanota (Hampson, 1912)

Synonyms
- Glyphodes athysanota Hampson, 1912

Species of moth

Parotis athysanota is a moth in the family Crambidae. It was described by George Hampson in 1912. It is found in India's Nilgiri Mountains and in New Guinea and Taiwan.
