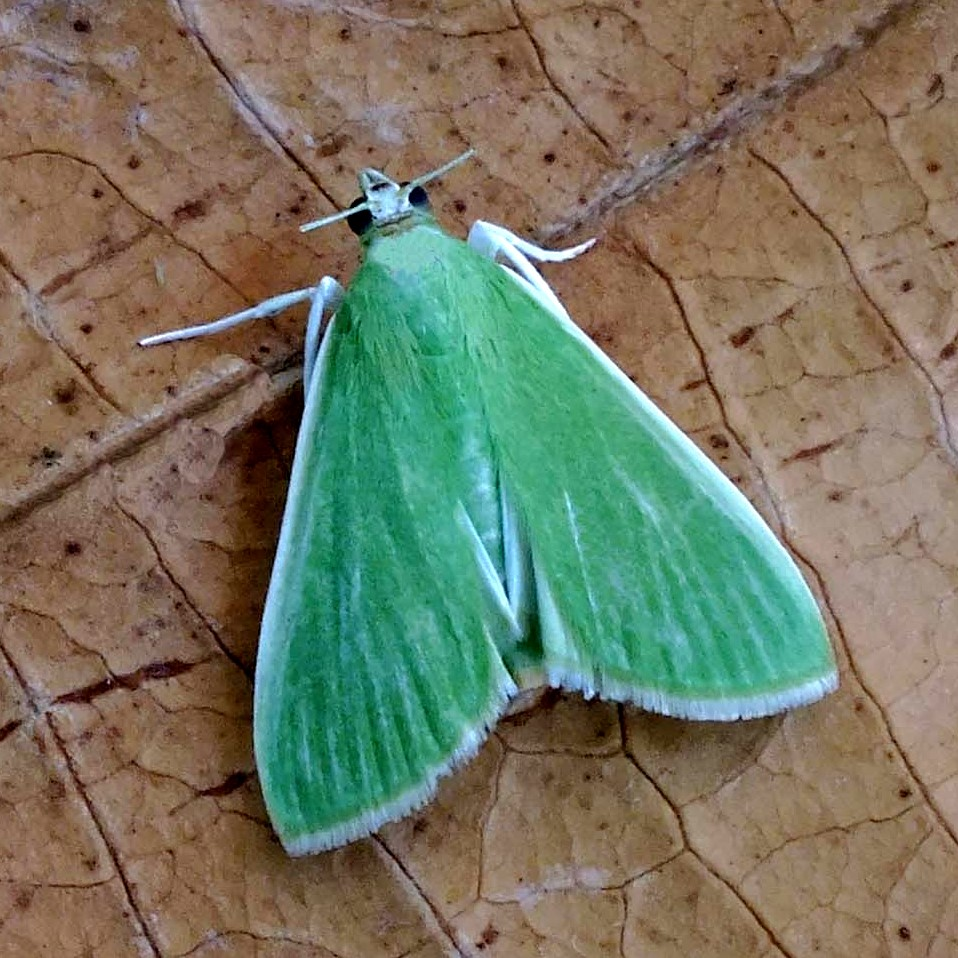

Scientific classification
- Kingdom: Animalia
- Phylum: Arthropoda
- Clade: Pancrustacea
- Class: Insecta
- Order: Lepidoptera
- Family: Crambidae
- Genus: Parotis
- Species: P. pomonalis

Binomial name
- Parotis pomonalis (Guenée, 1854)

Synonyms
- Margarodes pomonalis Guenée, 1854

= Parotis pomonalis =

Species of moth

Parotis pomonalis is a species of moth in the family Crambidae. It was first described by Achille Guenée in 1854. It is found in China, India, Sri Lanka, Borneo, Sumbawa and Australia.
