= Parotis invernalis =

Scientific classification
- Kingdom: Animalia
- Phylum: Arthropoda
- Class: Insecta
- Order: Lepidoptera
- Family: Crambidae
- Genus: Parotis
- Species: P. invernalis

Binomial name
- Parotis invernalis (de Joannis, 1927)

Synonyms
- Margaronia invernalis de Joannis, 1927

Species of moth

Parotis invernalis is a moth in the family Crambidae. It was described by Joseph de Joannis in 1927. It is found in Mozambique.
