= Parotis bracata =

Scientific classification
- Kingdom: Animalia
- Phylum: Arthropoda
- Class: Insecta
- Order: Lepidoptera
- Family: Crambidae
- Genus: Parotis
- Species: P. bracata

Binomial name
- Parotis bracata (E. Hering, 1901)

Synonyms
- Enchocnemidia bracata E. Hering, 1901

Species of moth

Parotis bracata is a moth in the family Crambidae. It was described by E. Hering in 1901. It is found in Indonesia (Sumatra).
