= Parotis impia =

Scientific classification
- Kingdom: Animalia
- Phylum: Arthropoda
- Class: Insecta
- Order: Lepidoptera
- Family: Crambidae
- Genus: Parotis
- Species: P. impia

Binomial name
- Parotis impia (Meyrick, 1934)

Synonyms
- Margaronia impia Meyrick, 1934

Species of moth

Parotis impia is a moth in the family Crambidae. It was described by Edward Meyrick in 1934. It is found in Mali, the Democratic Republic of the Congo (Equateur, East Kasai) and Zimbabwe.
