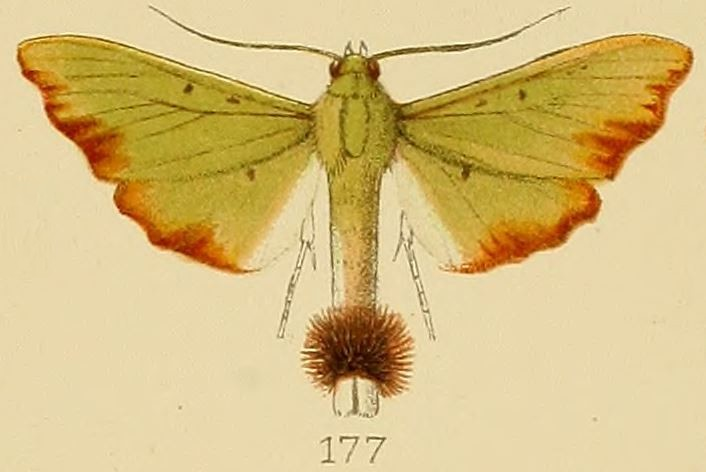

Scientific classification
- Kingdom: Animalia
- Phylum: Arthropoda
- Class: Insecta
- Order: Lepidoptera
- Family: Crambidae
- Genus: Parotis
- Species: P. laceritalis

Binomial name
- Parotis laceritalis (Kenrick, 1907)

Synonyms
- Glyphodes laceritalis Kenrick, 1907

= Parotis laceritalis =

Species of moth

Parotis laceritalis is a species of moth of the family Crambidae. It is found in Papua New Guinea, Indonesia and Taiwan.

It has a wingspan of 44 mm.
