= Parotis confinis =

Scientific classification
- Kingdom: Animalia
- Phylum: Arthropoda
- Class: Insecta
- Order: Lepidoptera
- Family: Crambidae
- Genus: Parotis
- Species: P. confinis

Binomial name
- Parotis confinis (Hampson, 1899)

Synonyms
- Glyphodes confinis Hampson, 1899

Species of moth

Parotis confinis is a moth in the family Crambidae. It was described by George Hampson in 1899. It is found in Taiwan and Australia, where it has been recorded from Queensland.
