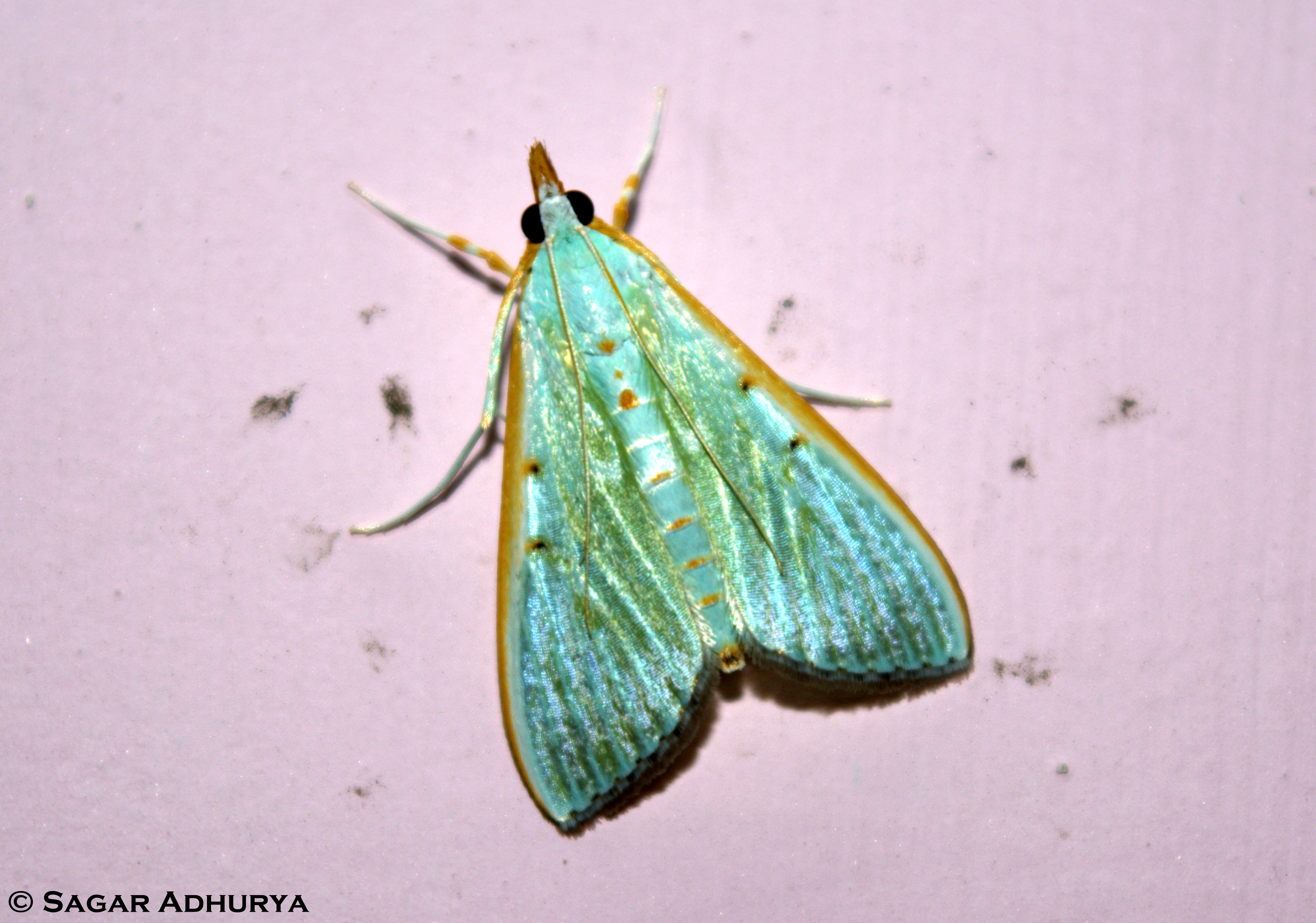

Scientific classification
- Kingdom: Animalia
- Phylum: Arthropoda
- Class: Insecta
- Order: Lepidoptera
- Family: Crambidae
- Tribe: Margaroniini
- Genus: Arthroschista; Hampson, 1893

= Arthroschista =

Genus of moths

Arthroschista is a genus of moths of the family Crambidae.

== Species ==
- Arthroschista hilaralis (Walker, 1859)
- Arthroschista tricoloralis (Pagenstecher, 1888)
