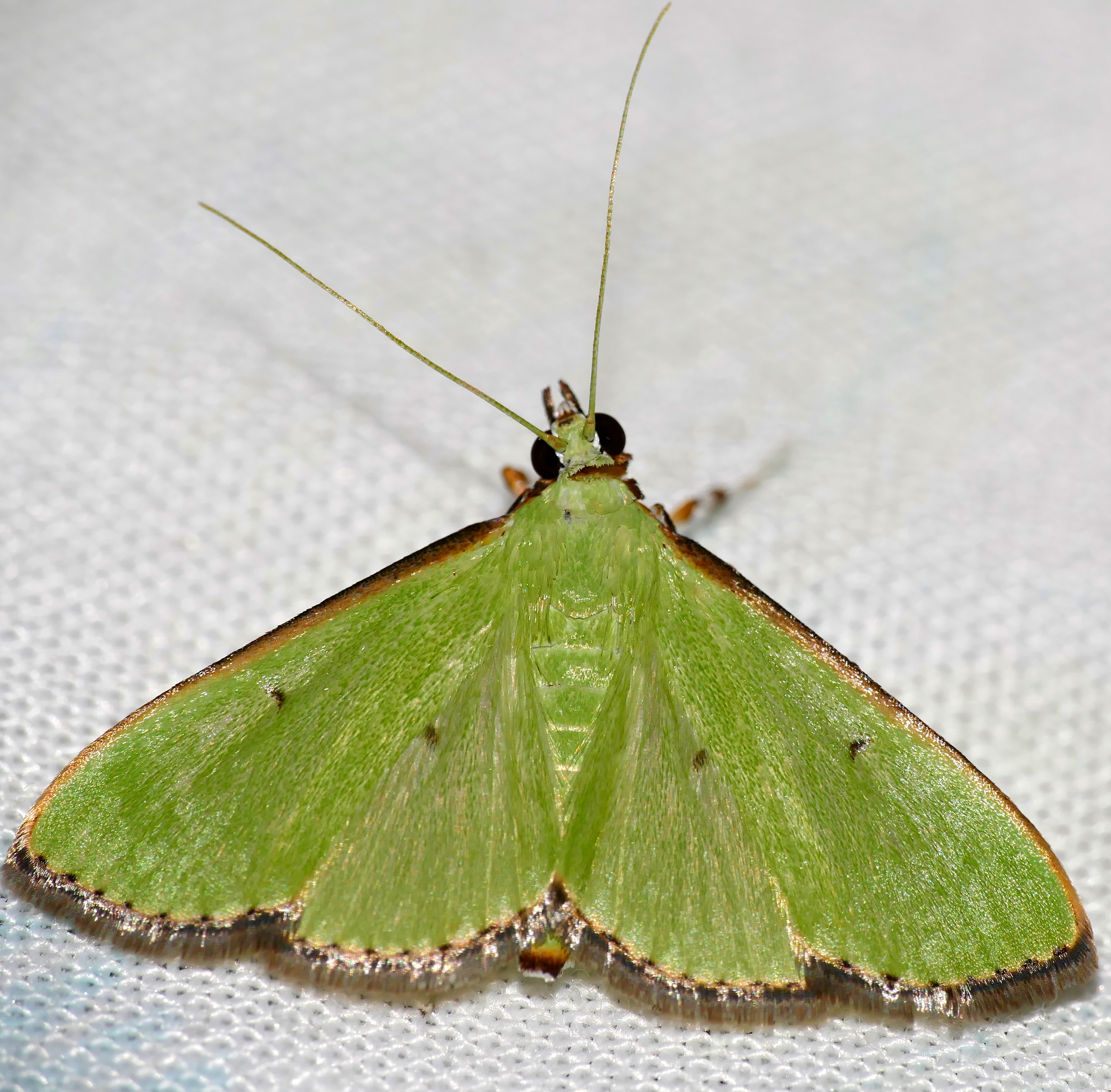
- Parotis baldersalis

Scientific classification
- Kingdom: Animalia
- Phylum: Arthropoda
- Clade: Pancrustacea
- Class: Insecta
- Order: Lepidoptera
- Family: Crambidae
- Genus: Parotis
- Species: P. baldersalis

Binomial name
- Parotis baldersalis (Walker, 1859)

Synonyms
- Margaronia baldersalis Walker, 1859

= Parotis baldersalis =

Species of moth

Parotis baldersalis is a moth in the family Crambidae. It was described by Francis Walker in 1859. It is found in Cameroon, the Democratic Republic of the Congo (North Kivu), Sierra Leone and South Africa (KwaZulu-Natal, Gauteng).
