= Parotis squamitibialis =

Scientific classification
- Kingdom: Animalia
- Phylum: Arthropoda
- Class: Insecta
- Order: Lepidoptera
- Family: Crambidae
- Genus: Parotis
- Species: P. squamitibialis

Binomial name
- Parotis squamitibialis (Strand, 1912)

Synonyms
- Glyphodes squamitibialis Strand, 1912

Species of moth

Parotis squamitibialis is a moth in the family Crambidae. It was described by Strand in 1912. It is found in Cameroon and the Democratic Republic of Congo.
