= Parotis fallacialis =

Scientific classification
- Kingdom: Animalia
- Phylum: Arthropoda
- Class: Insecta
- Order: Lepidoptera
- Family: Crambidae
- Genus: Parotis
- Species: P. fallacialis

Binomial name
- Parotis fallacialis (Snellen, 1890)

Synonyms
- Margaronia fallacialis Snellen, 1890

Species of moth

Parotis fallacialis is a moth in the family Crambidae. It was described by Snellen in 1890. It is found in India (Sikkim).
