= Parotis angustalis =

Scientific classification
- Kingdom: Animalia
- Phylum: Arthropoda
- Class: Insecta
- Order: Lepidoptera
- Family: Crambidae
- Genus: Parotis
- Species: P. angustalis

Binomial name
- Parotis angustalis (Snellen, 1895)

Synonyms
- Margaronia angustalis Snellen, 1895

Species of moth

Parotis angustalis is a moth in the family Crambidae. It was described by Snellen in 1895. It is found in Indonesia (Borneo).
