= Parotis amboinalis =

Scientific classification
- Kingdom: Animalia
- Phylum: Arthropoda
- Class: Insecta
- Order: Lepidoptera
- Family: Crambidae
- Genus: Parotis
- Species: P. amboinalis

Binomial name
- Parotis amboinalis (C. Swinhoe, 1906)

Synonyms
- Cenocnemis amboinalis C. Swinhoe, 1906

Species of moth

Parotis amboinalis is a moth in the family Crambidae. It was described by Charles Swinhoe in 1906. It is found on Indonesia's Ambon Island.
