= Parotis atlitalis =

Scientific classification
- Kingdom: Animalia
- Phylum: Arthropoda
- Class: Insecta
- Order: Lepidoptera
- Family: Crambidae
- Genus: Parotis
- Species: P. atlitalis

Binomial name
- Parotis atlitalis (Walker, 1859)

Synonyms
- Margaronia atlitalis Walker, 1859

Species of moth

Parotis atlitalis is a moth in the family Crambidae. It was described by Francis Walker in 1859. It is found in Indonesia (Borneo), the Philippines and Australia, where it has been recorded from Queensland and New South Wales.

The larvae feed on Glochidion ferdinandi.
