= Parotis ogasawarensis =

Scientific classification
- Kingdom: Animalia
- Phylum: Arthropoda
- Class: Insecta
- Order: Lepidoptera
- Family: Crambidae
- Genus: Parotis
- Species: P. ogasawarensis

Binomial name
- Parotis ogasawarensis (Shibuya, 1929)

Synonyms
- Margaronia ogasawarensis Shibuya, 1929

Species of moth

Parotis ogasawarensis is a moth in the family Crambidae. It was described by Shibuya in 1929. It is found in Japan, where it has been recorded from the Bonin Islands.
