= Parotis pyritalis =

Scientific classification
- Kingdom: Animalia
- Phylum: Arthropoda
- Class: Insecta
- Order: Lepidoptera
- Family: Crambidae
- Genus: Parotis
- Species: P. pyritalis

Binomial name
- Parotis pyritalis (Hampson, 1912)

Synonyms
- Glyphodes pyritalis Hampson, 1912

Species of moth

Parotis pyritalis is a moth in the family Crambidae. It was described by George Hampson in 1912. It is found in the Democratic Republic of the Congo (Katanga, North Kivu), Kenya and Mozambique.
