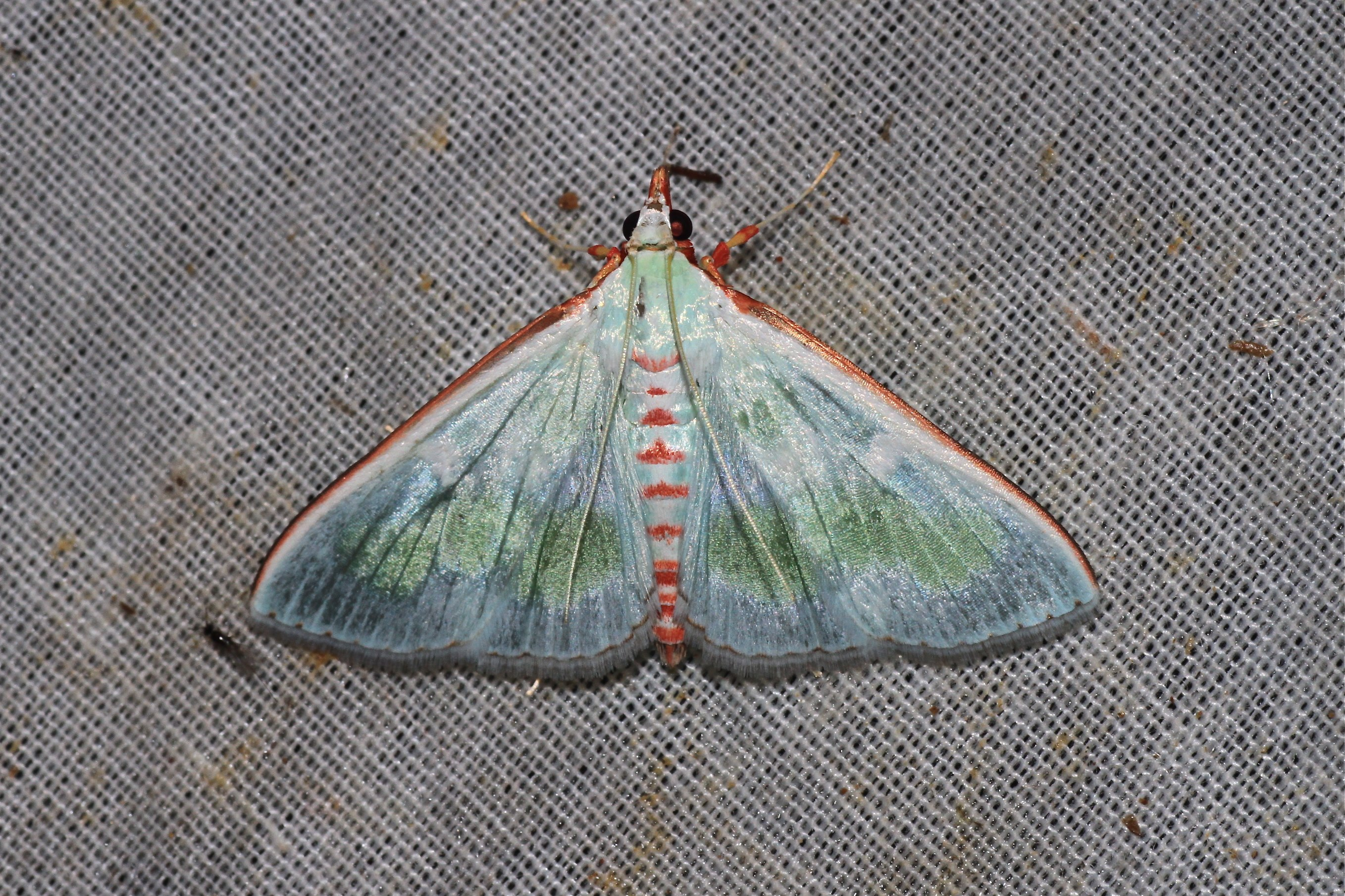
- Arthroschista tricoloralis - Borneo, Trusmadi area — 1000-1100 m

Scientific classification
- Kingdom: Animalia
- Phylum: Arthropoda
- Class: Insecta
- Order: Lepidoptera
- Family: Crambidae
- Genus: Arthroschista
- Species: A. tricoloralis

Binomial name
- Arthroschista tricoloralis (Pagenstecher, 1888)

Synonyms
- Margarodes tricoloralis Pagenstecher, 1888

= Arthroschista tricoloralis =

Species of moth

Arthroschista tricoloralis is a moth in the family Crambidae. It was described by Pagenstecher in 1888. It is found on Borneo, Malaysia, New Guinea as well as in Australia (Queensland).
