= Cangetta =

Scientific classification
- Domain: Eukaryota
- Kingdom: Animalia
- Phylum: Arthropoda
- Class: Insecta
- Order: Lepidoptera
- Family: Crambidae
- Subfamily: Spilomelinae
- Genus: Cangetta; Moore, 1886

Synonyms
- Blechrophanes Turner, 1937

Genus of moths

Cangetta is a genus of moths of the family Crambidae.

== Species ==
- Cangetta albiceps (Hampson, 1917) (from South Africa)
- Cangetta albocarnea Warren, 1896
- Cangetta ammochroa Turner, 1815
- Cangetta aurantiaca Hampson, 1906
- Cangetta cervinalis Caradja & Meyrick, 1934
- Cangetta eschatia J. F. G. Clarke, 1986
- Cangetta fulviceps (Hampson, 1917) (from Malawi)
- Cangetta furvitermen (Hampson, 1917) (from Malawi)
- Cangetta haematera (Turner, 1937)
- Cangetta hartoghialis (Snellen, 1872) (from Congo)
- Cangetta homoperalis Hampson, 1899
- Cangetta micralis (Hampson, 1907)
- Cangetta murinalis Snellen, 1901
- Cangetta primulina (Hampson, 1916) (from Cameroon)

== Former species ==
- Cangetta tridentalis (Snellen, 1872)
