= Deuterophysa =

Scientific classification
- Domain: Eukaryota
- Kingdom: Animalia
- Phylum: Arthropoda
- Class: Insecta
- Order: Lepidoptera
- Family: Crambidae
- Subfamily: Spilomelinae
- Genus: Deuterophysa; Warren, 1889

Synonyms
- Gonopionea Hampson, 1913

Genus of moths

Deuterophysa is a genus of moths of the family Crambidae described by Warren in 1889.

== Species ==
- Deuterophysa albilunalis (Hampson, 1913)
- Deuterophysa asychanalis Warren, 1889
- Deuterophysa baracoalis (Schaus, 1924)
- Deuterophysa biconicalis (Hampson, 1918)
- Deuterophysa coniferalis (Hampson, 1918)
- Deuterophysa costimaculalis Warren, 1889
- Deuterophysa fernaldi Munroe, 1983
- Deuterophysa flavidalis (Hampson, 1918)
- Deuterophysa grisealis Hampson, 1917
- Deuterophysa luniferalis (Hampson, 1913)
- Deuterophysa obregonalis Schaus, 1924
- Deuterophysa pallidifimbria (Dognin, 1909)
- Deuterophysa purpurealis (Hampson, 1913)
- Deuterophysa sanguiflualis (Hampson, 1913)
- Deuterophysa subrosea (Warren, 1892)

== Former species ==
- Deuterophysa micralis Hampson, 1907
