= Cangetta murinalis =

Scientific classification
- Kingdom: Animalia
- Phylum: Arthropoda
- Class: Insecta
- Order: Lepidoptera
- Family: Crambidae
- Subfamily: Spilomelinae
- Genus: Cangetta
- Species: C. murinalis

Binomial name
- Cangetta murinalis Snellen, 1901

Species of moth

Cangetta murinalis is a moth in the family Crambidae. It was described by Snellen in 1901. It is found on Java.
