= Cangetta albiceps =

Scientific classification
- Domain: Eukaryota
- Kingdom: Animalia
- Phylum: Arthropoda
- Class: Insecta
- Order: Lepidoptera
- Family: Crambidae
- Subfamily: Spilomelinae
- Genus: Cangetta
- Species: C. albiceps

Binomial name
- Cangetta albiceps (Hampson, 1917)

Synonyms
- Parthenodes albiceps Hampson, 1917

Species of moth

Cangetta albiceps is a moth in the family Crambidae. It was described by George Hampson in 1917. It is found in South Africa.
