= Deuterophysa albilunalis =

Scientific classification
- Kingdom: Animalia
- Phylum: Arthropoda
- Class: Insecta
- Order: Lepidoptera
- Family: Crambidae
- Genus: Deuterophysa
- Species: D. albilunalis

Binomial name
- Deuterophysa albilunalis (Hampson, 1913)

Synonyms
- Gonopionea albilunalis Hampson, 1913

Species of moth

Deuterophysa albilunalis is a moth in the family Crambidae. It was described by George Hampson in 1913. It is found in French Guiana.
