= Cangetta albocarnea =

Scientific classification
- Domain: Eukaryota
- Kingdom: Animalia
- Phylum: Arthropoda
- Class: Insecta
- Order: Lepidoptera
- Family: Crambidae
- Subfamily: Spilomelinae
- Genus: Cangetta
- Species: C. albocarnea

Binomial name
- Cangetta albocarnea Warren, 1896

Species of moth

Cangetta albocarnea is a moth in the family Crambidae. It was described by Warren in 1896. It is found in India (Meghalaya).
