= Deuterophysa fernaldi =

Scientific classification
- Domain: Eukaryota
- Kingdom: Animalia
- Phylum: Arthropoda
- Class: Insecta
- Order: Lepidoptera
- Family: Crambidae
- Genus: Deuterophysa
- Species: D. fernaldi

Binomial name
- Deuterophysa fernaldi Munroe, 1983

Synonyms
- Pyrausta costimaculalis Fernald, 1901 (preocc. Warren, 1889)

Species of moth

Deuterophysa fernaldi is a moth in the family Crambidae. It was described by Eugene G. Munroe in 1983. It is found in Cuba and the south-eastern United States, where it has been recorded from Florida.

Adults have been recorded on wing from January to October and in December in Florida.

The larvae feed on Psychotria nervosa.
