= Deuterophysa sanguiflualis =

Scientific classification
- Kingdom: Animalia
- Phylum: Arthropoda
- Class: Insecta
- Order: Lepidoptera
- Family: Crambidae
- Genus: Deuterophysa
- Species: D. sanguiflualis

Binomial name
- Deuterophysa sanguiflualis (Hampson, 1913)

Synonyms
- Gonopionea sanguiflualis Hampson, 1913

Species of moth

Deuterophysa sanguiflualis is a moth in the family Crambidae. It was described by George Hampson in 1913. It is found in Jamaica.
