= Deuterophysa purpurealis =

Scientific classification
- Kingdom: Animalia
- Phylum: Arthropoda
- Class: Insecta
- Order: Lepidoptera
- Family: Crambidae
- Genus: Deuterophysa
- Species: D. purpurealis

Binomial name
- Deuterophysa purpurealis (Hampson, 1913)

Synonyms
- Gonopionea purpurealis Hampson, 1913; Gonopionea purpuralis

Species of moth

Deuterophysa purpurealis is a moth in the family Crambidae. It was described by George Hampson in 1913. It is found in Colombia.
