= Cangetta haematera =

Scientific classification
- Domain: Eukaryota
- Kingdom: Animalia
- Phylum: Arthropoda
- Class: Insecta
- Order: Lepidoptera
- Family: Crambidae
- Subfamily: Spilomelinae
- Genus: Cangetta
- Species: C. haematera

Binomial name
- Cangetta haematera (Turner, 1937)

Synonyms
- Cataclysta haematera Turner, 1937

Species of moth

Cangetta haematera is a moth in the family Crambidae. It was described by Turner in 1937. It is found in Australia, where it has been recorded from Queensland.
