= Cangetta ammochroa =

Scientific classification
- Domain: Eukaryota
- Kingdom: Animalia
- Phylum: Arthropoda
- Class: Insecta
- Order: Lepidoptera
- Family: Crambidae
- Subfamily: Spilomelinae
- Genus: Cangetta
- Species: C. ammochroa

Binomial name
- Cangetta ammochroa Turner, 1915

Species of moth

Cangetta ammochroa is a moth in the family Crambidae. It was described by Turner in 1915. It is found in Australia, where it has been recorded from the Northern Territory.

The wingspan is about 10 mm. The forewings are pale-brown, with a costal fuscous streak and two brown transverse lines, as well as four or five brown-fuscous dots on the apical half of the termen, edged by a narrow whitish shade. The hindwings are as the forewings, but without the first line and with a line from the costa forming a V-shaped curve in the disc and ending on the dorsum near the tornus. Adults have been recorded on wing in January.
