= Deuterophysa flavidalis =

Scientific classification
- Kingdom: Animalia
- Phylum: Arthropoda
- Class: Insecta
- Order: Lepidoptera
- Family: Crambidae
- Genus: Deuterophysa
- Species: D. flavidalis

Binomial name
- Deuterophysa flavidalis (Hampson, 1918)

Synonyms
- Gonopionea flavidalis Hampson, 1918

Species of moth

Deuterophysa flavidalis is a moth in the family Crambidae. It was described by George Hampson in 1918. It is found in Colombia.
