= Deuterophysa baracoalis =

Scientific classification
- Kingdom: Animalia
- Phylum: Arthropoda
- Class: Insecta
- Order: Lepidoptera
- Family: Crambidae
- Genus: Deuterophysa
- Species: D. baracoalis

Binomial name
- Deuterophysa baracoalis (Schaus, 1924)

Synonyms
- Camptomastix baracoalis Schaus, 1924

Species of moth

Deuterophysa baracoalis is a moth in the family Crambidae. It was described by Schaus in 1924. It is found in Cuba.
