= Deuterophysa pallidifimbria =

Scientific classification
- Domain: Eukaryota
- Kingdom: Animalia
- Phylum: Arthropoda
- Class: Insecta
- Order: Lepidoptera
- Family: Crambidae
- Genus: Deuterophysa
- Species: D. pallidifimbria

Binomial name
- Deuterophysa pallidifimbria (Dognin, 1909)

Synonyms
- Mimudea pallidifimbria Dognin, 1909

Species of moth

Deuterophysa pallidifimbria is a moth in the family Crambidae. It was described by Paul Dognin in 1909. It is found in French Guiana.
