= Cangetta aurantiaca =

Scientific classification
- Kingdom: Animalia
- Phylum: Arthropoda
- Clade: Pancrustacea
- Class: Insecta
- Order: Lepidoptera
- Family: Crambidae
- Subfamily: Spilomelinae
- Genus: Cangetta
- Species: C. aurantiaca

Binomial name
- Cangetta aurantiaca Hampson, 1906

Synonyms
- Blechrophanes crocoptila Turner, 1937

Species of moth

Cangetta aurantiaca is a moth in the family Crambidae. It was described by George Hampson in 1906. It is found in New Guinea and Australia, where it has been recorded from Queensland.

There are three broad bands of yellow shades on each wing.
