= Cangetta cervinalis =

Scientific classification
- Domain: Eukaryota
- Kingdom: Animalia
- Phylum: Arthropoda
- Class: Insecta
- Order: Lepidoptera
- Family: Crambidae
- Subfamily: Spilomelinae
- Genus: Cangetta
- Species: C. cervinalis

Binomial name
- Cangetta cervinalis Caradja & Meyrick, 1934

Species of moth

Cangetta cervinalis is a moth in the family Crambidae. It was described by Aristide Caradja and Edward Meyrick in 1934. It is found in China and the Russian Far East.
