= Deuterophysa obregonalis =

Scientific classification
- Domain: Eukaryota
- Kingdom: Animalia
- Phylum: Arthropoda
- Class: Insecta
- Order: Lepidoptera
- Family: Crambidae
- Genus: Deuterophysa
- Species: D. obregonalis

Binomial name
- Deuterophysa obregonalis Schaus, 1924

Species of moth

Deuterophysa obregonalis is a moth in the family Crambidae. It is found in Mexico.
