= Deuterophysa luniferalis =

Scientific classification
- Kingdom: Animalia
- Phylum: Arthropoda
- Class: Insecta
- Order: Lepidoptera
- Family: Crambidae
- Genus: Deuterophysa
- Species: D. luniferalis

Binomial name
- Deuterophysa luniferalis (Hampson, 1913)

Synonyms
- Pionea luniferalis Hampson, 1913

Species of moth

Deuterophysa luniferalis is a moth in the family Crambidae. It was described by George Hampson in 1913. It is found in Brazil.
