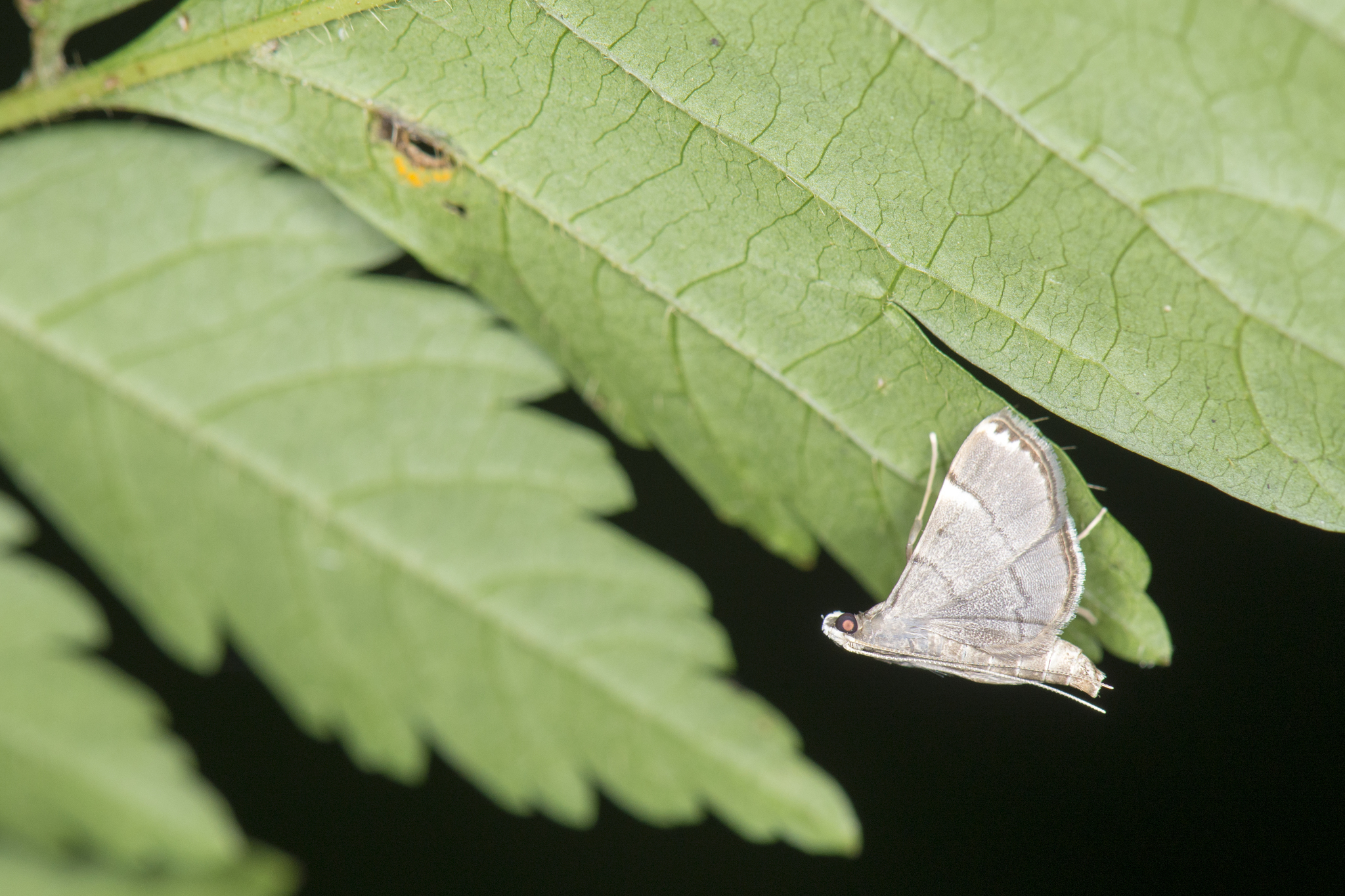

Scientific classification
- Kingdom: Animalia
- Phylum: Arthropoda
- Class: Insecta
- Order: Lepidoptera
- Family: Crambidae
- Subfamily: Spilomelinae
- Genus: Cangetta
- Species: C. hartoghialis

Binomial name
- Cangetta hartoghialis (Snellen, 1872)

Synonyms
- Paraponyx hartoghialis Snellen, 1872; Cangetta rectilinea Moore, 1886; Parapoynx griseolalis Hampson, 1893

= Cangetta hartoghialis =

Species of moth

Cangetta hartoghialis is a moth in the family Crambidae. It was described by Snellen in 1872. It is found in the Democratic Republic of Congo and Sri Lanka.
