= Deuterophysa subrosea =

Scientific classification
- Domain: Eukaryota
- Kingdom: Animalia
- Phylum: Arthropoda
- Class: Insecta
- Order: Lepidoptera
- Family: Crambidae
- Genus: Deuterophysa
- Species: D. subrosea

Binomial name
- Deuterophysa subrosea (Warren, 1892)

Synonyms
- Mimudea subrosea Warren, 1892

Species of moth

Deuterophysa subrosea is a moth in the family Crambidae. It was described by Warren in 1892. It is found in Brazil (São Paulo).
