= Cangetta homoperalis =

Scientific classification
- Domain: Eukaryota
- Kingdom: Animalia
- Phylum: Arthropoda
- Class: Insecta
- Order: Lepidoptera
- Family: Crambidae
- Subfamily: Spilomelinae
- Genus: Cangetta
- Species: C. homoperalis

Binomial name
- Cangetta homoperalis Hampson, 1899

Species of moth

Cangetta homoperalis is a moth in the family Crambidae. It was described by George Hampson in 1899. It is found in Sri Lanka.
