= Deuterophysa grisealis =

Scientific classification
- Kingdom: Animalia
- Phylum: Arthropoda
- Class: Insecta
- Order: Lepidoptera
- Family: Crambidae
- Genus: Deuterophysa
- Species: D. grisealis

Binomial name
- Deuterophysa grisealis Hampson, 1917

Species of moth

Deuterophysa grisealis is a moth in the family Crambidae. It was described by George Hampson in 1917. It is found in Malawi.
