= Deuterophysa costimaculalis =

Scientific classification
- Domain: Eukaryota
- Kingdom: Animalia
- Phylum: Arthropoda
- Class: Insecta
- Order: Lepidoptera
- Family: Crambidae
- Genus: Deuterophysa
- Species: D. costimaculalis

Binomial name
- Deuterophysa costimaculalis Warren, 1889

Species of moth

Deuterophysa costimaculalis is a moth in the family Crambidae. It was described by Warren in 1889. It is found in Brazil.
