= Cangetta primulina =

Scientific classification
- Kingdom: Animalia
- Phylum: Arthropoda
- Clade: Pancrustacea
- Class: Insecta
- Order: Lepidoptera
- Family: Crambidae
- Subfamily: Spilomelinae
- Genus: Cangetta
- Species: C. primulina

Binomial name
- Cangetta primulina (Hampson, 1916)

Synonyms
- Endotricha primulina Hampson, 1916; Hyalobathra primulina

Species of moth

Cangetta primulina is a moth in the family Crambidae. It is found in Cameroon.
