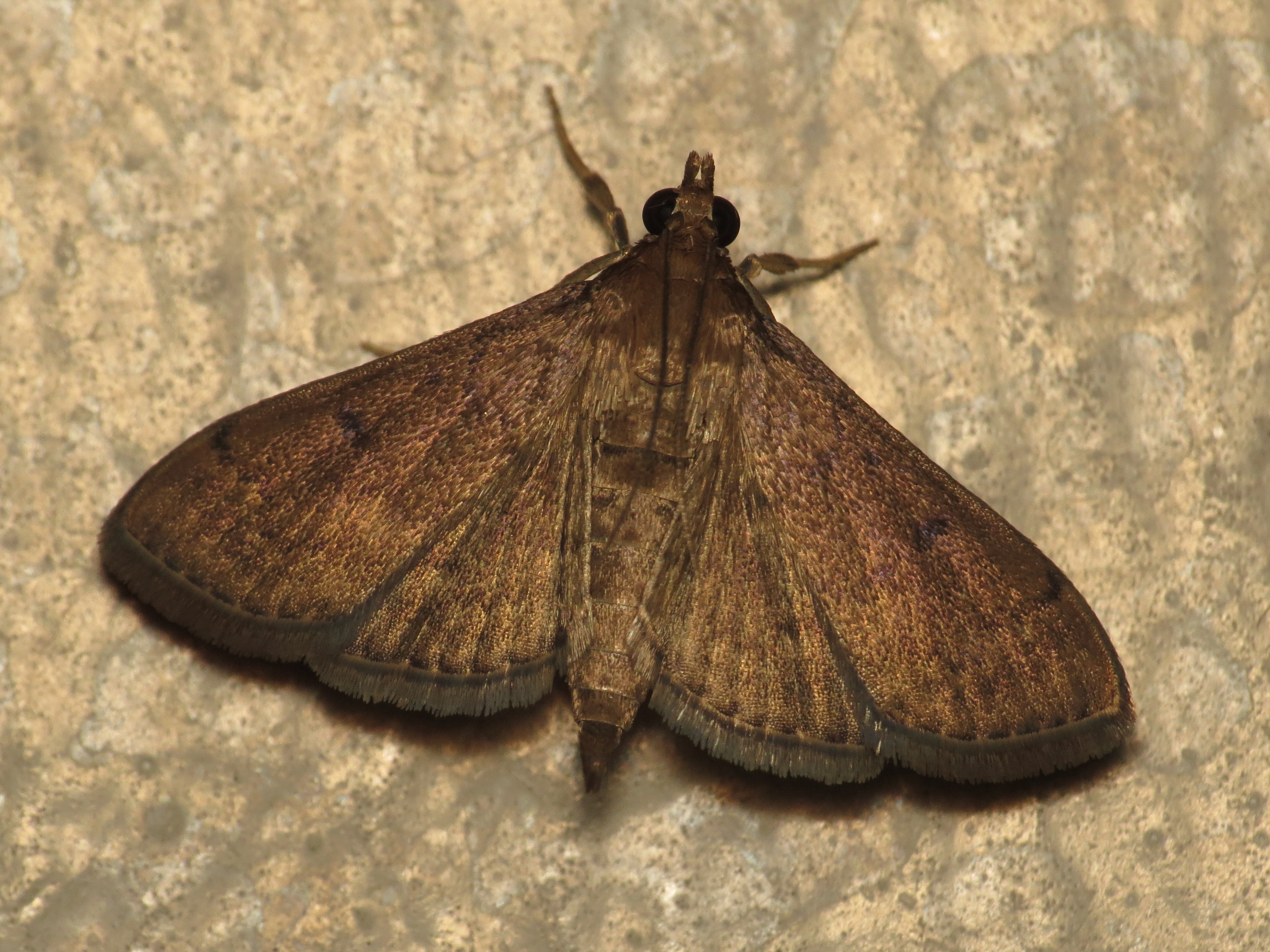

Scientific classification
- Domain: Eukaryota
- Kingdom: Animalia
- Phylum: Arthropoda
- Class: Insecta
- Order: Lepidoptera
- Family: Crambidae
- Genus: Herpetogramma
- Species: H. phaeopteralis

Binomial name
- Herpetogramma phaeopteralis (Guenée, 1854)

Synonyms
- List: Botys phaeopteralis Guenée, 1854; Acharana descripta Warren, 1892; Botys additalis Walker, 1862; Botys cellatalis Walker, 1866; Botys communalis Snellen, 1875; Botys inhonestalis Walker, 1866; Botys neloalis Walker, 1859; Botys otreusalis Walker, 1859; Botys plebejalis Lederer, 1863; Botys triarialis Walker, 1859; Botys tridentalis Snellen, 1872; Botys vecordalis Guenée, 1854; Botys vestalis Walker, 1859; Botys intricatalis Möschler, 1890; Herpetogramma phacopteralis; Herpetogramma phoeopteralis

= Herpetogramma phaeopteralis =

Dusky herpetogramma

Species of moth

Herpetogramma phaeopteralis, commonly known as the dark sod webworm, is a species of moth in the family Crambidae. It was described by Achille Guenée in 1854.

== Description ==
The adult's wingspan is about 18 mm.

== Distribution and habitat ==
It is found in the United States (from South Carolina to Florida, west to Texas), Central America and South America, on the Andamans, India, Myanmar, Sri Lanka, Vietnam, the Democratic Republic of the Congo, Kenya, Réunion, Madagascar, Mauritius, Saint Helena, the Seychelles, Sierra Leone, South Africa, Sudan, the Gambia, Yemen and Zambia.

== Behaviour and ecology ==
The larvae feed on the leaves of grasses. mmm
