= Cangetta micralis =

Scientific classification
- Domain: Eukaryota
- Kingdom: Animalia
- Phylum: Arthropoda
- Class: Insecta
- Order: Lepidoptera
- Family: Crambidae
- Subfamily: Spilomelinae
- Genus: Cangetta
- Species: C. micralis

Binomial name
- Cangetta micralis (Hampson, 1907)

Synonyms
- Deuterophysa micralis Hampson, 1907

Species of moth

Cangetta micralis is a moth in the family Crambidae. It is found in South America, the Caribbean (including Jamaica) and in southern Florida.

The larvae feed on the buds and flowers of Palicourea rigida in Brazil.
