= Paliga damastesalis =

Scientific classification
- Kingdom: Animalia
- Phylum: Arthropoda
- Class: Insecta
- Order: Lepidoptera
- Family: Crambidae
- Genus: Paliga
- Species: P. damastesalis

Binomial name
- Paliga damastesalis (Walker, 1859)

Synonyms
- Scopula damastesalis Walker, 1859

Species of moth

Paliga damastesalis is a moth in the family Crambidae. It was described by Francis Walker in 1859. It is found in Sri Lanka.
