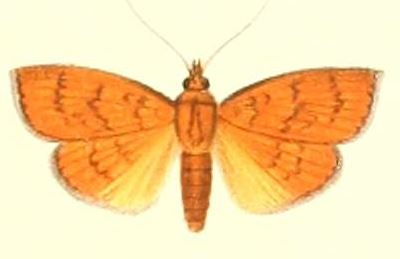

Scientific classification
- Kingdom: Animalia
- Phylum: Arthropoda
- Class: Insecta
- Order: Lepidoptera
- Family: Crambidae
- Genus: Paliga
- Species: P. ignealis

Binomial name
- Paliga ignealis (Walker, 1866)

Synonyms
- Botys ignealis Walker, 1866; Isocentris subauroralis Pagenstecher, 1900

= Paliga ignealis =

Species of moth

Paliga ignealis is a moth of the family Crambidae. It was described by Francis Walker in 1866 and it is found in New Guinea and Queensland, Australia.

Adults have orange wings with brown lines.
