= Paliga rubicundalis =

Scientific classification
- Domain: Eukaryota
- Kingdom: Animalia
- Phylum: Arthropoda
- Class: Insecta
- Order: Lepidoptera
- Family: Crambidae
- Genus: Paliga
- Species: P. rubicundalis

Binomial name
- Paliga rubicundalis Warren, 1896

Species of moth

Paliga rubicundalis is a moth in the family Crambidae. It was described by Warren in 1896. It is found in India (Khasia Hills).
