= Paliga fuscicostalis =

Scientific classification
- Domain: Eukaryota
- Kingdom: Animalia
- Phylum: Arthropoda
- Class: Insecta
- Order: Lepidoptera
- Family: Crambidae
- Genus: Paliga
- Species: P. fuscicostalis

Binomial name
- Paliga fuscicostalis C. Swinhoe, 1894

Species of moth

Paliga fuscicostalis is a moth in the family Crambidae. It was described by Charles Swinhoe in 1894. It is found in India.
