= Paliga anpingialis =

Scientific classification
- Domain: Eukaryota
- Kingdom: Animalia
- Phylum: Arthropoda
- Class: Insecta
- Order: Lepidoptera
- Family: Crambidae
- Genus: Paliga
- Species: P. anpingialis

Binomial name
- Paliga anpingialis (Strand, 1918)

Synonyms
- Phlyctaenodes anpingialis Strand, 1918

Species of moth

Paliga anpingialis is a species of moth of the family Crambidae described by Embrik Strand in 1918. It is found in Taiwan.
