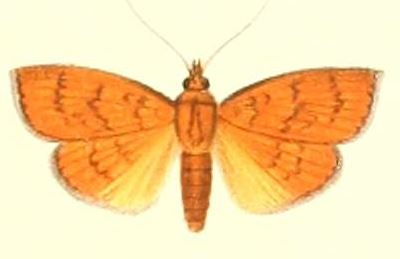
- Paliga ignealis

Scientific classification
- Domain: Eukaryota
- Kingdom: Animalia
- Phylum: Arthropoda
- Class: Insecta
- Order: Lepidoptera
- Family: Crambidae
- Subfamily: Pyraustinae
- Genus: Paliga; Moore, 1886

Synonyms
- Eutectona Wang & Sung, 1980

= Paliga =

Genus of moths

Paliga is a genus of moths of the family Crambidae erected by Frederic Moore in 1886.

== Species ==
- Paliga anpingialis (Strand, 1918)
- Paliga celatalis (Walker, 1859)
- Paliga damastesalis (Walker, 1859)
- Paliga fuscicostalis C. Swinhoe, 1894
- Paliga ignealis (Walker, 1866)
- Paliga leerna fontanis (Carolo, 2016)
- Paliga leucanalis C. Swinhoe, 1890
- Paliga machoeralis (Walker, 1859)
- Paliga quadrigalis (Hering, 1901)
- Paliga rubicundalis Warren, 1896
- Paliga schenklingi (Strand, 1918)
