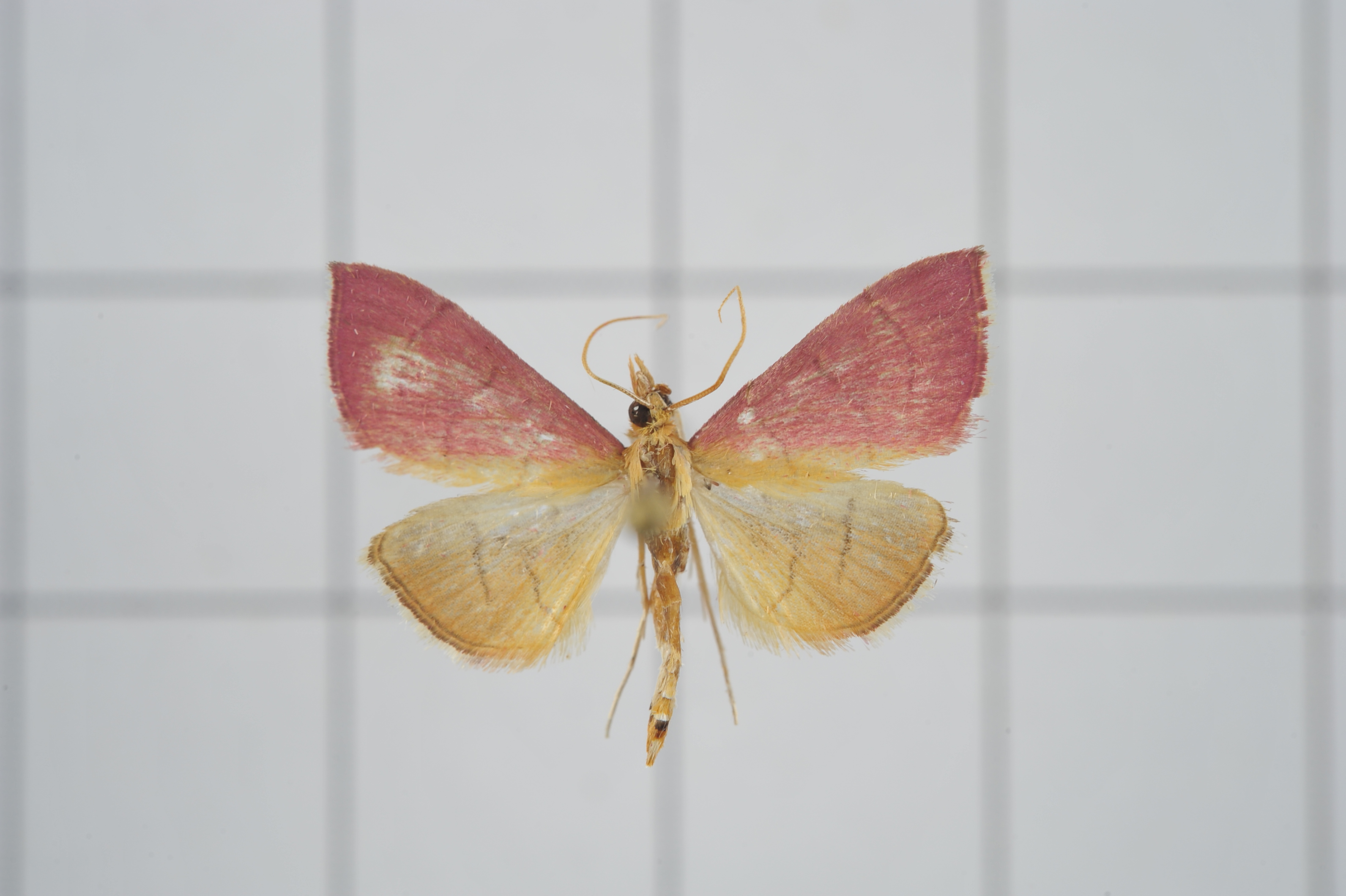

Scientific classification
- Domain: Eukaryota
- Kingdom: Animalia
- Phylum: Arthropoda
- Class: Insecta
- Order: Lepidoptera
- Family: Crambidae
- Genus: Paliga
- Species: P. schenklingi

Binomial name
- Paliga schenklingi (Strand, 1918)

Synonyms
- Pionea schenklingi Strand, 1918

= Paliga schenklingi =

Species of moth

Paliga schenklingi is a moth in the family Crambidae. It was described by Embrik Strand in 1918. It is found in Taiwan.
