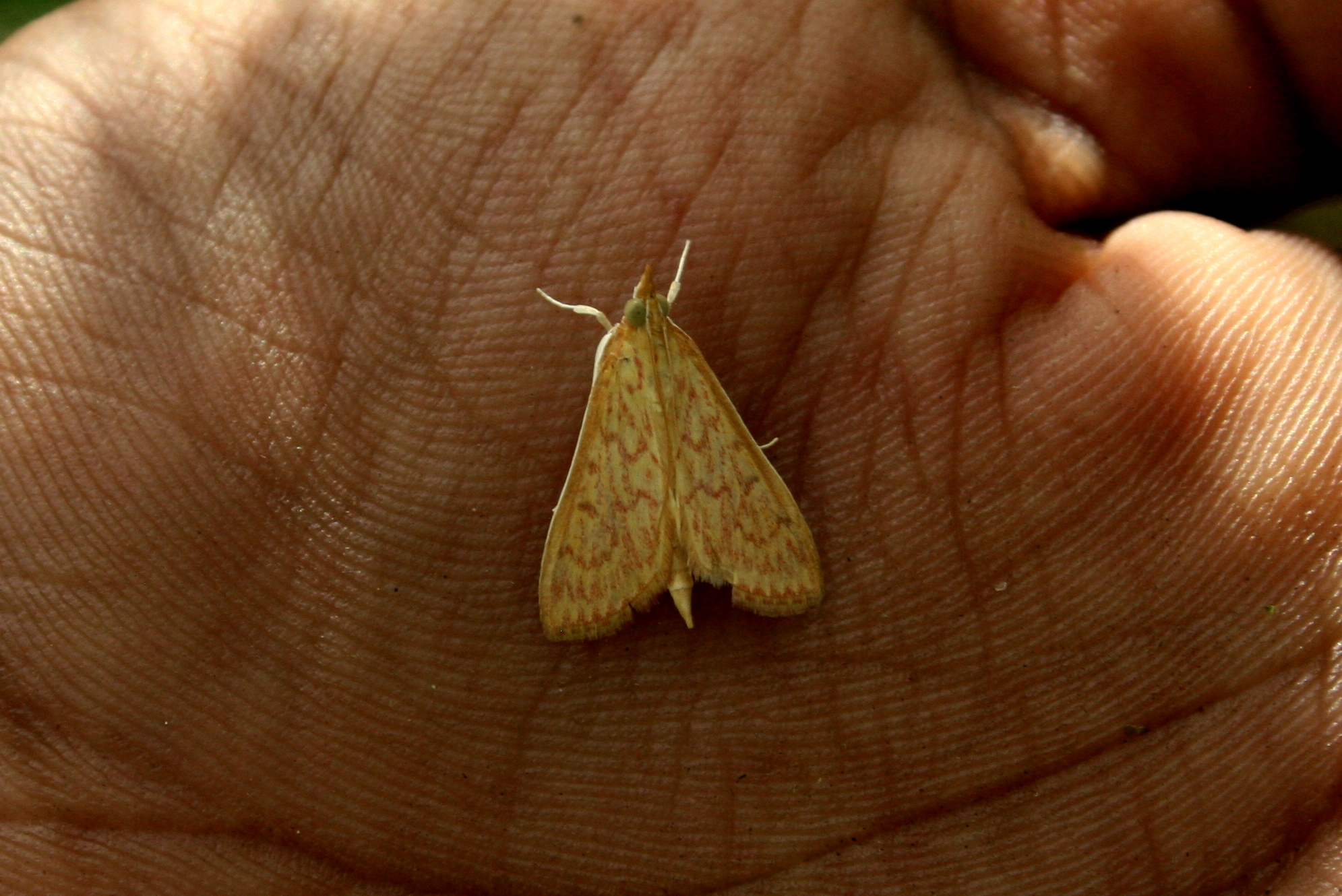
- In Sri Lanka

Scientific classification
- Kingdom: Animalia
- Phylum: Arthropoda
- Class: Insecta
- Order: Lepidoptera
- Family: Crambidae
- Genus: Paliga
- Species: P. machoeralis

Binomial name
- Paliga machoeralis (Walker, 1859)

Synonyms
- Scopula machoeralis Walker, 1859; Botys egenalis Lederer, 1863; Botys machaeralis Moore, 1886

= Paliga machoeralis =

Species of moth

Paliga machoeralis is a moth in the family Crambidae. It was described by Francis Walker in 1859. It is found in Sri Lanka, India and Taiwan.
