= Paliga leucanalis =

Scientific classification
- Domain: Eukaryota
- Kingdom: Animalia
- Phylum: Arthropoda
- Class: Insecta
- Order: Lepidoptera
- Family: Crambidae
- Genus: Paliga
- Species: P. leucanalis

Binomial name
- Paliga leucanalis C. Swinhoe, 1890

Species of moth

Paliga leucanalis is a moth in the family Crambidae. It was described by Charles Swinhoe in 1890. It is found in Myanmar.
