= Paliga quadrigalis =

Scientific classification
- Domain: Eukaryota
- Kingdom: Animalia
- Phylum: Arthropoda
- Class: Insecta
- Order: Lepidoptera
- Family: Crambidae
- Genus: Paliga
- Species: P. quadrigalis

Binomial name
- Paliga quadrigalis (Hering, 1901)

Synonyms
- Pyrausta quadrigalis Hering, 1901

Species of moth

Paliga quadrigalis is a moth in the family Crambidae. It is found on Sumatra and in Australia.
