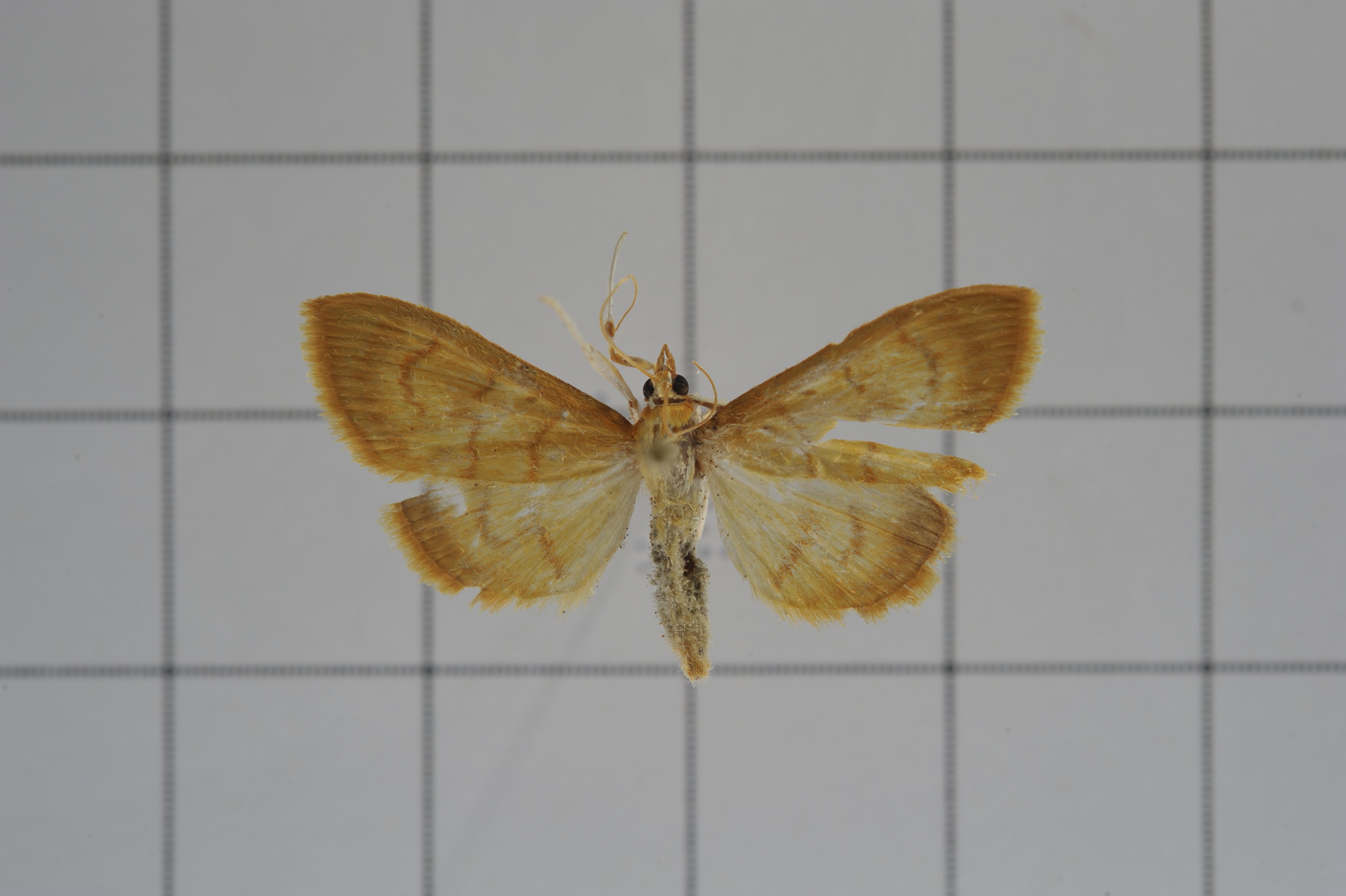

Scientific classification
- Kingdom: Animalia
- Phylum: Arthropoda
- Class: Insecta
- Order: Lepidoptera
- Family: Crambidae
- Genus: Paliga
- Species: P. celatalis

Binomial name
- Paliga celatalis (Walker, 1859)

Synonyms
- Pyrausta celatalis Walker, 1859

= Paliga celatalis =

Species of moth

Paliga celatalis is a moth in the family Crambidae. It is found in Taiwan and probably in Sri Lanka.

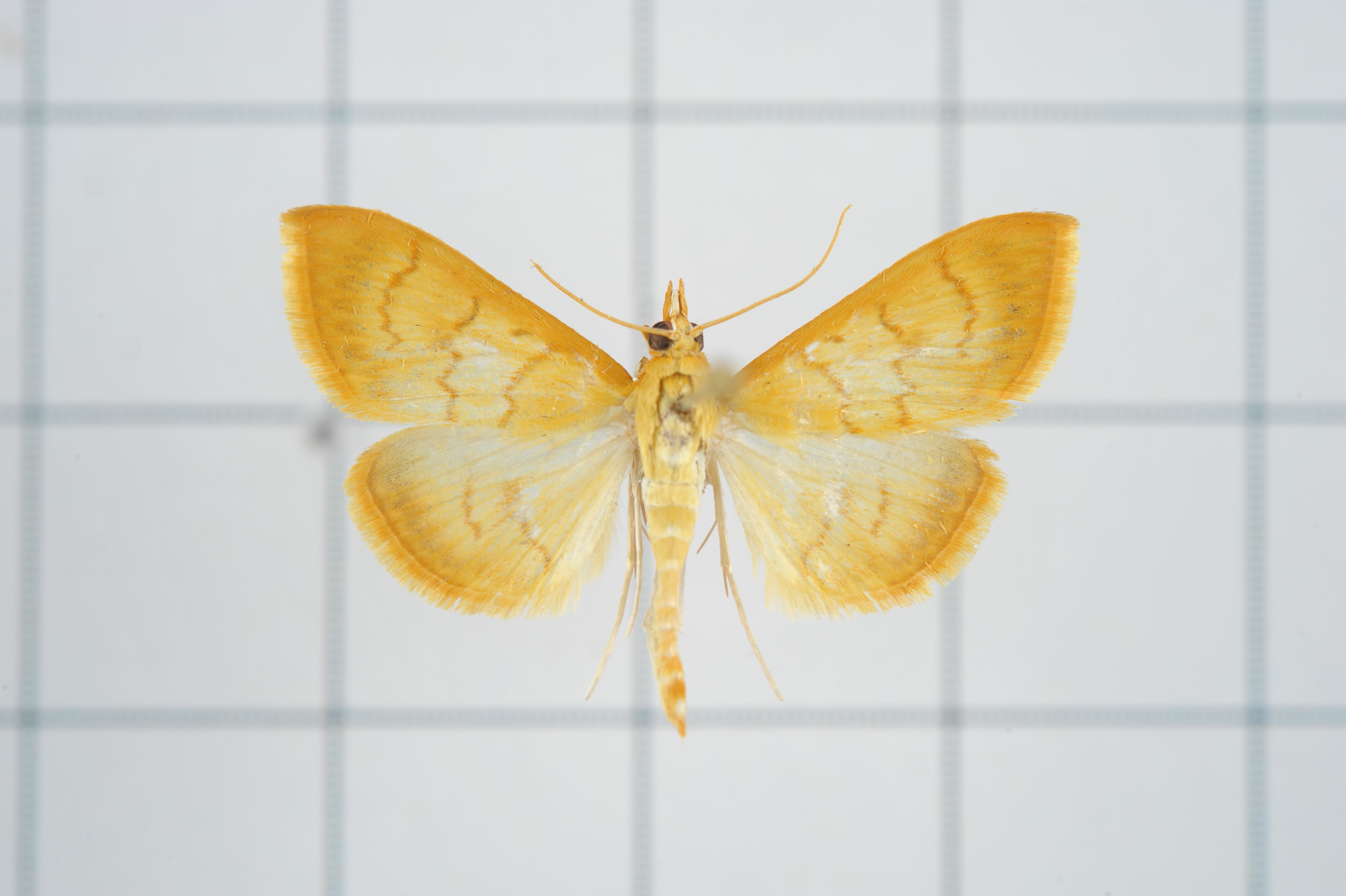
