= Conocrambus dileucellus =

Scientific classification
- Kingdom: Animalia
- Phylum: Arthropoda
- Class: Insecta
- Order: Lepidoptera
- Family: Crambidae
- Subfamily: Crambinae
- Tribe: incertae sedis
- Genus: Conocrambus
- Species: C. dileucellus

Binomial name
- Conocrambus dileucellus (Hampson, 1896)

Synonyms
- Crambus dileucellus Hampson, 1896

Species of moth

Conocrambus dileucellus is a moth in the family Crambidae. It was described by George Hampson in 1896. It is found on Borneo.
