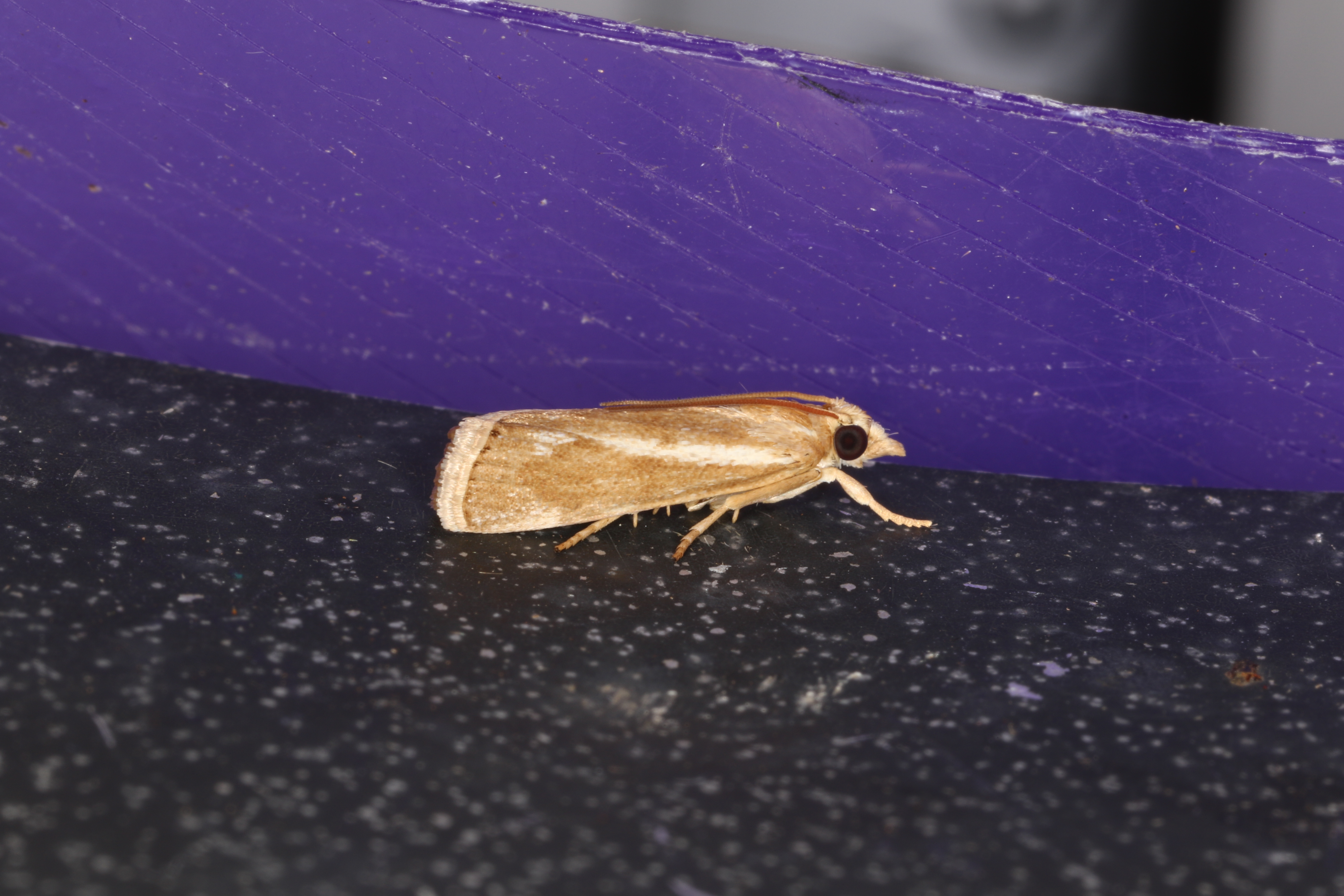
- Palm Cove, Queensland, January 2016

Scientific classification
- Kingdom: Animalia
- Phylum: Arthropoda
- Class: Insecta
- Order: Lepidoptera
- Family: Crambidae
- Subfamily: Crambinae
- Tribe: incertae sedis
- Genus: Conocrambus
- Species: C. medioradiellus

Binomial name
- Conocrambus medioradiellus (Hampson, 1919)

Synonyms
- Crambus medioradiellus Hampson, 1919; Crambus ammoploceus Turner, 1922

= Conocrambus medioradiellus =

Species of moth

Conocrambus medioradiellus is a moth in the family Crambidae. It was described by George Hampson in 1919. It is found in Australia, where it has been recorded from Queensland.
