= Conocrambus atrimictellus =

Scientific classification
- Kingdom: Animalia
- Phylum: Arthropoda
- Class: Insecta
- Order: Lepidoptera
- Family: Crambidae
- Subfamily: Crambinae
- Tribe: incertae sedis
- Genus: Conocrambus
- Species: C. atrimictellus

Binomial name
- Conocrambus atrimictellus Hampson, 1919

Species of moth

Conocrambus atrimictellus is a moth in the family Crambidae. It was described by George Hampson in 1919. It is found in New Guinea.
