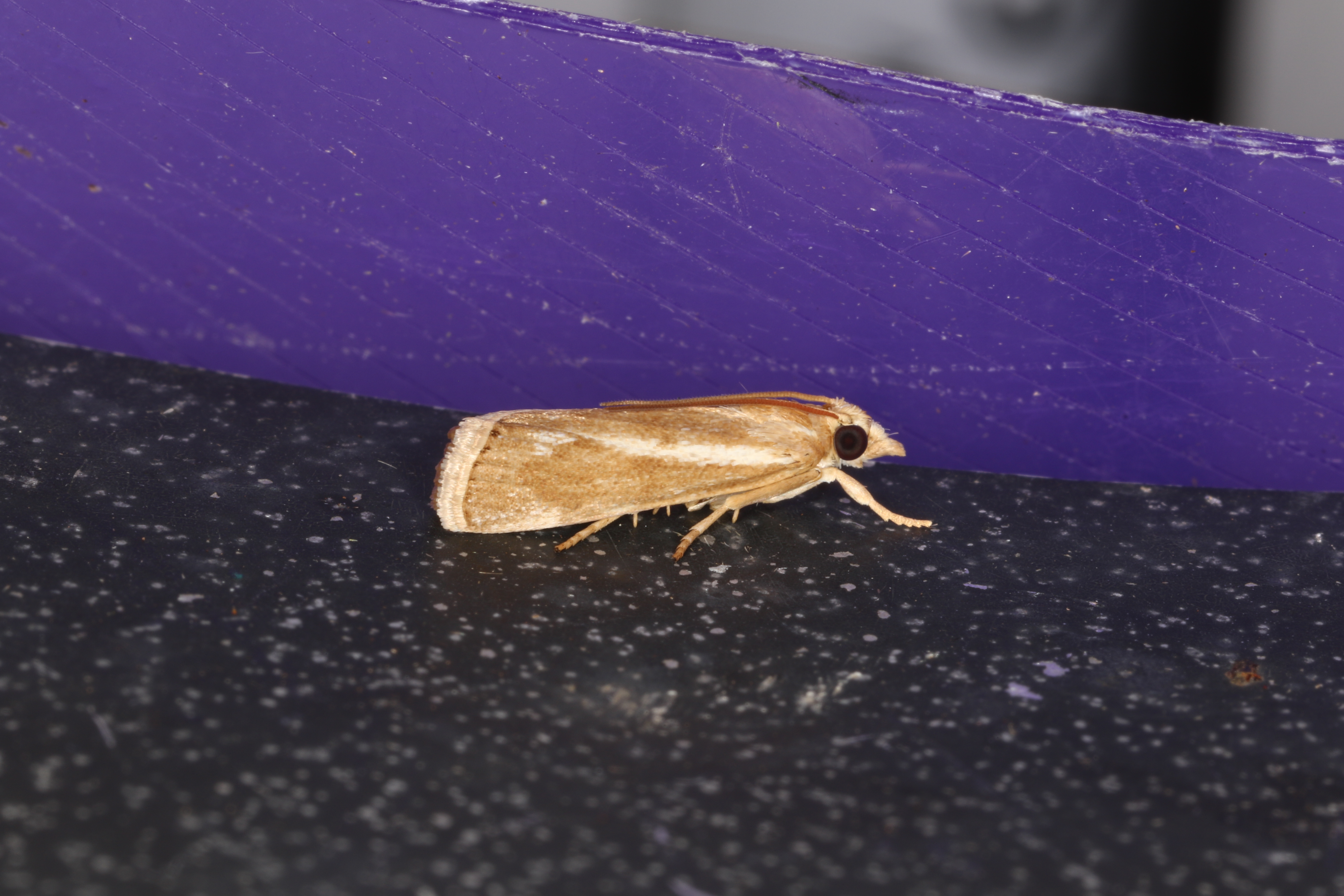
- Conocrambus medioradiellus

Scientific classification
- Domain: Eukaryota
- Kingdom: Animalia
- Phylum: Arthropoda
- Class: Insecta
- Order: Lepidoptera
- Family: Crambidae
- Subfamily: Crambinae
- Tribe: incertae sedis
- Genus: Conocrambus; Hampson, 1919

= Conocrambus =

Genus of moths

Conocrambus is a genus of moths of the family Crambidae.

== Species ==
- Conocrambus atrimictellus Hampson, 1919
- Conocrambus dileucellus (Hampson, 1896)
- Conocrambus medioradiellus (Hampson, 1919)
- Conocrambus wollastoni (Rothschild, 1916)
- Conocrambus xuthochroa (Turner, 1947)
