= Conocrambus xuthochroa =

Scientific classification
- Domain: Eukaryota
- Kingdom: Animalia
- Phylum: Arthropoda
- Class: Insecta
- Order: Lepidoptera
- Family: Crambidae
- Subfamily: Crambinae
- Tribe: incertae sedis
- Genus: Conocrambus
- Species: C. xuthochroa

Binomial name
- Conocrambus xuthochroa (Turner, 1947)

Synonyms
- Anaresca xuthochroa Turner, 1947

Species of moth

Conocrambus xuthochroa is a moth in the family Crambidae. It was described by Turner in 1947. It is found in Australia, where it has been recorded from Queensland.
