= Conocrambus wollastoni =

Scientific classification
- Domain: Eukaryota
- Kingdom: Animalia
- Phylum: Arthropoda
- Class: Insecta
- Order: Lepidoptera
- Family: Crambidae
- Subfamily: Crambinae
- Tribe: incertae sedis
- Genus: Conocrambus
- Species: C. wollastoni

Binomial name
- Conocrambus wollastoni (Rothschild, 1916)

Synonyms
- Epischnia wollastoni Rothschild, 1916; Crambus cinereus Hampson, 1919

Species of moth

Conocrambus wollastoni is a moth in the family Crambidae. It was described by Rothschild in 1916. It is found in New Guinea.
