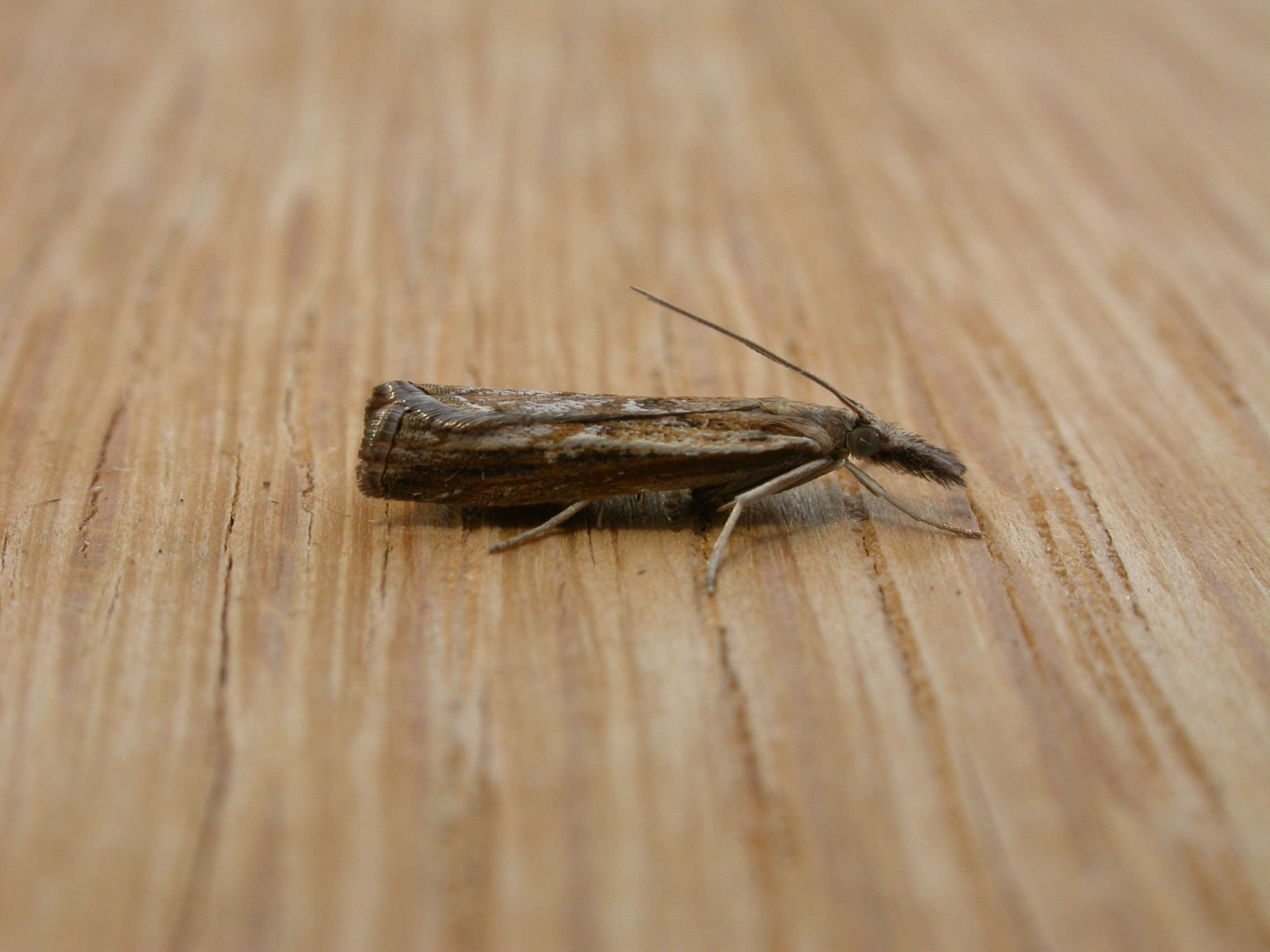

Scientific classification
- Domain: Eukaryota
- Kingdom: Animalia
- Phylum: Arthropoda
- Class: Insecta
- Order: Lepidoptera
- Family: Crambidae
- Subfamily: Crambinae
- Tribe: incertae sedis
- Genus: Ptochostola
- Species: P. microphaeellus

Binomial name
- Ptochostola microphaeellus (Walker, 1866)

Synonyms
- Crambus microphaeellus Walker, 1866; Crambus dimidiellus Meyrick, 1879

= Ptochostola microphaeellus =

Species of moth

Ptochostola microphaeellus is a species of moth of the family Crambidae. It is found in Australia, including Tasmania.
