= Ptochostola metascotiella =

Scientific classification
- Kingdom: Animalia
- Phylum: Arthropoda
- Class: Insecta
- Order: Lepidoptera
- Family: Crambidae
- Subfamily: Crambinae
- Tribe: incertae sedis
- Genus: Ptochostola
- Species: P. metascotiella

Binomial name
- Ptochostola metascotiella Hampson, 1919

Species of moth

Ptochostola metascotiella is a moth in the family Crambidae. It was described by George Hampson in 1919. It is found in South Africa, where it has been recorded from the Eastern Cape.
