= Ptochostola dirutellus =

Scientific classification
- Kingdom: Animalia
- Phylum: Arthropoda
- Class: Insecta
- Order: Lepidoptera
- Family: Crambidae
- Subfamily: Crambinae
- Tribe: incertae sedis
- Genus: Ptochostola
- Species: P. dirutellus

Binomial name
- Ptochostola dirutellus (Walker, 1866)

Synonyms
- Crambus dirutellus Walker, 1866

Species of moth

Ptochostola dirutellus is a moth in the family Crambidae. It was described by Francis Walker in 1866. It is found in Australia.
