= Ptochostola asaphes =

Scientific classification
- Domain: Eukaryota
- Kingdom: Animalia
- Phylum: Arthropoda
- Class: Insecta
- Order: Lepidoptera
- Family: Crambidae
- Subfamily: Crambinae
- Tribe: incertae sedis
- Genus: Ptochostola
- Species: P. asaphes

Binomial name
- Ptochostola asaphes Turner, 1937

Species of moth

Ptochostola asaphes is a moth in the family Crambidae. It was described by Turner in 1937. It is found in northern Australia.
