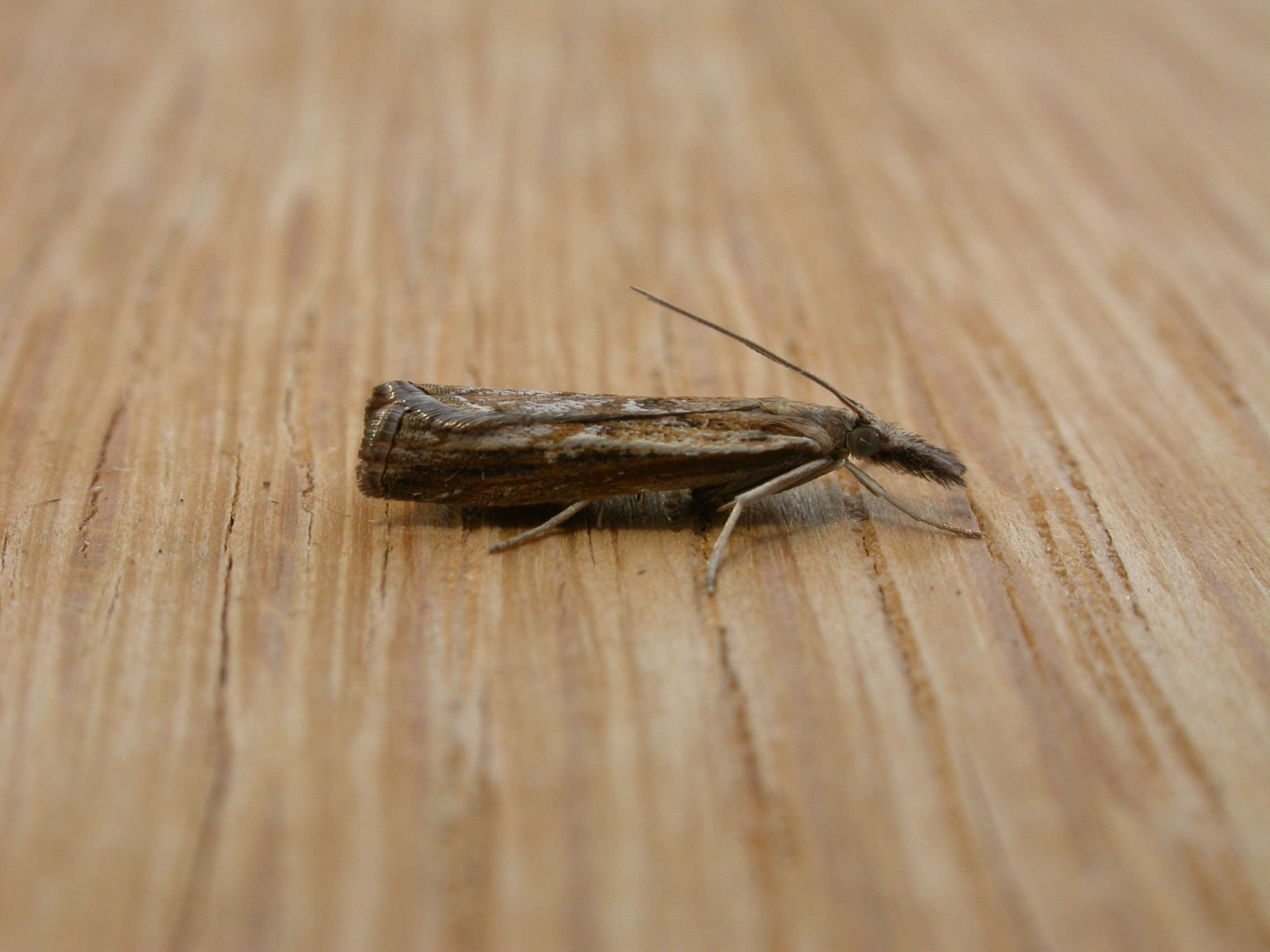
- Ptochostola microphaeellus

Scientific classification
- Domain: Eukaryota
- Kingdom: Animalia
- Phylum: Arthropoda
- Class: Insecta
- Order: Lepidoptera
- Family: Crambidae
- Subfamily: Crambinae
- Tribe: incertae sedis
- Genus: Ptochostola; Meyrick, 1882

= Ptochostola =

Genus of moths

Ptochostola is a genus of moths of the family Crambidae.

== Species ==
- Ptochostola asaphes Turner, 1937
- Ptochostola dirutellus (Walker, 1866)
- Ptochostola metascotiella Hampson, 1919
- Ptochostola microphaeellus (Walker, 1866)
