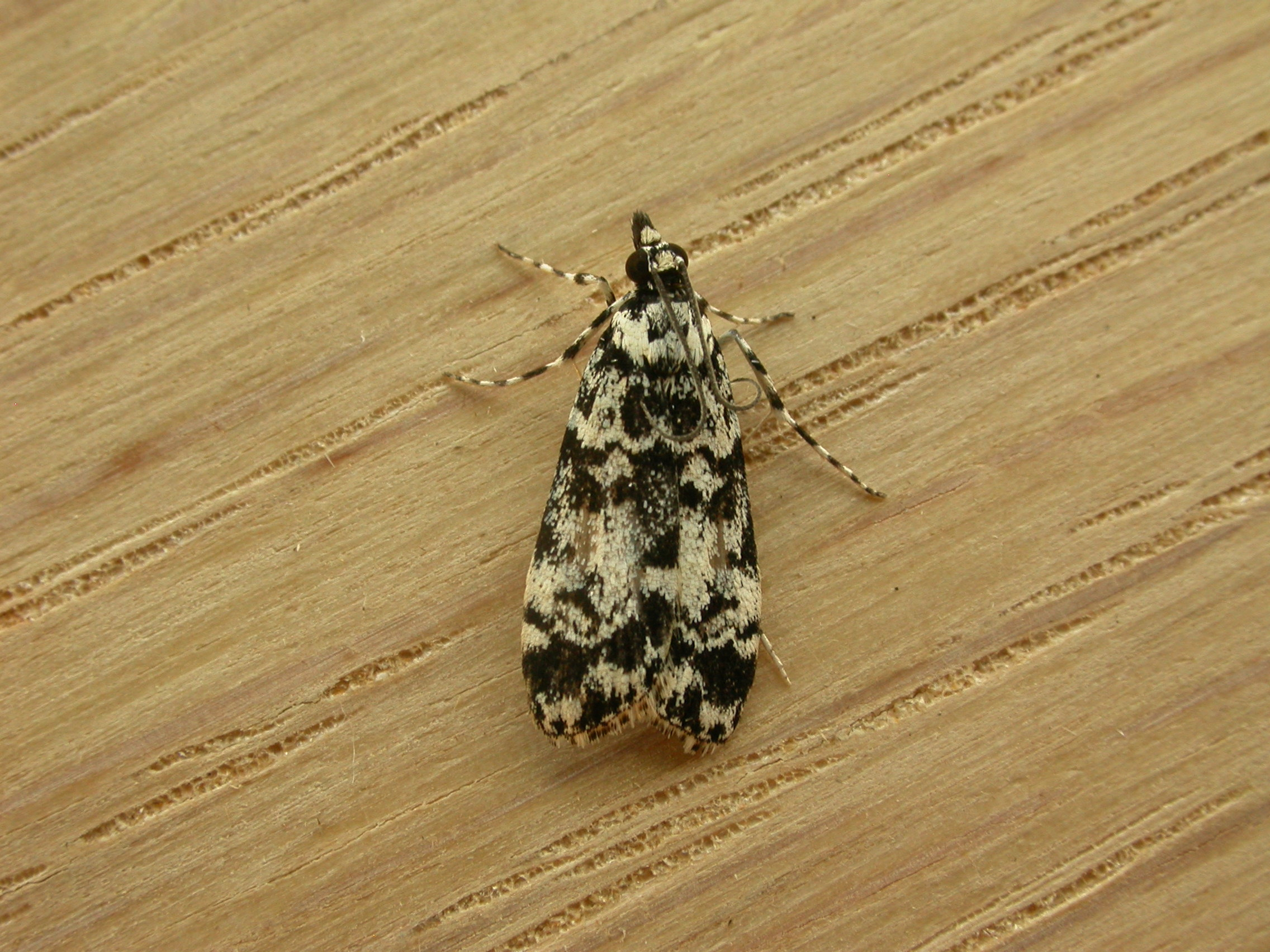

Scientific classification
- Kingdom: Animalia
- Phylum: Arthropoda
- Class: Insecta
- Order: Lepidoptera
- Family: Crambidae
- Genus: Eudonia
- Species: E. aphrodes

Binomial name
- Eudonia aphrodes (Meyrick, 1884)

Synonyms
- Scoparia aphrodes Meyrick, 1884

= Eudonia aphrodes =

Species of moth

Eudonia aphrodes is a species of moth of the family Crambidae described by Edward Meyrick in 1884. It is found in Australia, where it has been recorded from New South Wales.

The wingspan is 15–17 mm. The forewings are clear ochreous white with fuscous markings, suffused with black. The hindwings are grey whitish, the hindmargin suffused with grey. Adults have been recorded on wing in October.
