= Autarotis euryala =

Scientific classification
- Domain: Eukaryota
- Kingdom: Animalia
- Phylum: Arthropoda
- Class: Insecta
- Order: Lepidoptera
- Family: Crambidae
- Subfamily: Crambinae
- Tribe: incertae sedis
- Genus: Autarotis
- Species: A. euryala

Binomial name
- Autarotis euryala Meyrick, 1886

Species of moth

Autarotis euryala is a moth in the family Crambidae. It was described by Edward Meyrick in 1886. It is found on Fiji.
