= Autarotis =

Scientific classification
- Domain: Eukaryota
- Kingdom: Animalia
- Phylum: Arthropoda
- Class: Insecta
- Order: Lepidoptera
- Family: Crambidae
- Subfamily: Crambinae
- Tribe: incertae sedis
- Genus: Autarotis; Meyrick, 1886

Synonyms
- Pogonoptera Turner, 1911

Genus of moths

Autarotis is a genus of moths of the family Crambidae.

== Species ==
- Autarotis euryala Meyrick, 1886
- Autarotis milvellus (Meyrick, 1879)
- Autarotis polioleuca (Turner, 1911)
