= Autarotis milvellus =

Scientific classification
- Domain: Eukaryota
- Kingdom: Animalia
- Phylum: Arthropoda
- Class: Insecta
- Order: Lepidoptera
- Family: Crambidae
- Subfamily: Crambinae
- Tribe: incertae sedis
- Genus: Autarotis
- Species: A. milvellus

Binomial name
- Autarotis milvellus (Meyrick, 1879)

Synonyms
- Crambus milvellus Meyrick, 1879; Hednota milvellus

Species of moth

Autarotis milvellus is a moth in the family Crambidae. It was described by Edward Meyrick in 1879. It is found in Australia, where it has been recorded from New South Wales.
