= List of crambid genera: S =

The large moth family Crambidae contains the following genera beginning with "S":

- Sacculosia
- Sagariphora
- Salbia
- Salbiomorpha
- Samea
- Sameodes
- Sameodesma
- Sarabotys
- Saroscelis
- Sarothronota
- Satanastra
- Sathria
- Saucrobotys
- Scaeocerandra
- Scaptesylodes
- Sceliodes
- Scenoploca
- Schacontia
- Schoenerupa
- Schoenobiodes
- Schoenobius
- Schoenoploca
- Sciorista
- Scirpophaga
- Scissolia
- Sclerocona
- Scoparia
- Scopolia
- Scoptonoma
- Scybalista
- Scybalistodes
- Sebrus
- Sebunta
- Sedenia
- Sematosopha
- Semioceros
- Semniomima
- Sericocrambus
- Sericophylla
- Sericoplaga
- Sestia
- Siga
- Silveria
- Singamia
- Sinibotys
- Sinomphisa
- Siriocauta - junior synonym of Maruca
- Sisyracera
- Sisyrophora
- Sitochroa
- Sobanga
- Somatania
- Sozoa
- Sparagmia
- Spargeta
- Sphaerodeltis
- Spilomela
- Spoladea
- Stantira
- Stegea
- Stegothyris
- Stemorrhages
- Stenia
- Stenicula
- Steniodes
- Stenocalama
- Stenochilo
- Stenochora
- Stenomeles
- Stenophyes
- Stenopydna
- Stenorista
- Stiphrometasia
- Storteria
- Strepsimela
- Strepsinoma
- Streptobela
- Styphlolepis
- Styxon
- Subhedylepta
- Sufetula
- Supercrambus
- Surattha
- Susumia
- Syllepis
- Syllepte
- Syllythria
- Sylora
- Symmoracma
- Symphonia
- Symphysa
- Synchromia
- Synclera
- Synclita
- Synclitodes
- Syncrotaula
- Syngamia
- Syngamilyta
- Syngropia
- Syntomodora
- Syntonarcha
- Syntrita
- Syrbatis
- Syrianarpia
