= List of crambid genera: D =

The large moth family Crambidae contains the following genera beginning with "D":

- Dadessa
- Danaga
- Daraba
- Dasyscopa
- Daulia
- Dausara
- Davana
- Deana
- Deanolis
- Deba
- Decelia
- Decticogaster
- Deltobotys
- Demobotys
- Denticornutia
- Dentifovea
- Desmia
- Deuterarcha
- Deuterolia
- Deuterophysa
- Diacme
- Diadexia
- Diaphania
- Diaphantania
- Diasemia
- Diasemiodes
- Diasemiopsis
- Diastictis
- Diathrausta
- Diathraustodes
- Diatraea
- Diatraenopsis
- Diatraerupa
- Dicepolia
- Dichochromia
- Dichocrocis
- Dichocrocopsis
- Dichogama
- Dichotis
- Dichozoma
- Dicymolomia
- Didymostoma
- Dilacinia
- Dimorphocrambus
- Diphryx
- Dipleurina
- Dipleurinodes
- Diplopseustis
- Diploptalis
- Diploschistis
- Diplotyla
- Diptychophora
- Discothyris
- Dismidila
- Dodanga
- Dolicharthria
- Dolichobela
- Dolichosticha
- Donacaula
- Donacoscaptes
- Doratoperas
- Dosara
- Dracaenura
- Drachma
- Drosophantis
- Duponchelia
- Duzulla
- Dysallacta
