= List of crambid genera: K =

The large moth family Crambidae contains the following genera beginning with "K":

- Kasania
- Kerbela
- Knysna
- Krombia
- Kupea
