= Eurhythma latifasciella =

Scientific classification
- Domain: Eukaryota
- Kingdom: Animalia
- Phylum: Arthropoda
- Class: Insecta
- Order: Lepidoptera
- Family: Crambidae
- Subfamily: Crambinae
- Tribe: incertae sedis
- Genus: Eurhythma
- Species: E. latifasciella

Binomial name
- Eurhythma latifasciella Turner, 1904

Synonyms
- Argyria (Eurhythma) latifasciella

Species of moth

Eurhythma latifasciella is a moth in the family Crambidae. It was described by Turner in 1904. It is found in Australia.
