= Ubida ramostriellus =

Scientific classification
- Kingdom: Animalia
- Phylum: Arthropoda
- Class: Insecta
- Order: Lepidoptera
- Family: Crambidae
- Subfamily: Crambinae
- Tribe: incertae sedis
- Genus: Ubida
- Species: U. ramostriellus

Binomial name
- Ubida ramostriellus (Walker, 1863)

Synonyms
- Crambus ramostriellus Walker, 1863; Chilo schistellus Meyrick, 1879; Ubida receptalis Walker, 1863

Species of moth

Ubida ramostriellus is a moth in the family Crambidae. It was described by Francis Walker in 1863. It is found in Australia, where it has been recorded from Queensland, New South Wales and Victoria.

The wingspan is about 40 mm. The forewings are brown with branching white stripes.
