= Corynophora argentifascia =

Scientific classification
- Kingdom: Animalia
- Phylum: Arthropoda
- Class: Insecta
- Order: Lepidoptera
- Family: Crambidae
- Subfamily: Crambinae
- Tribe: incertae sedis
- Genus: Corynophora
- Species: C. argentifascia

Binomial name
- Corynophora argentifascia (Hampson, 1919)

Species of moth

Corynophora argentifascia is a moth in the family Crambidae. It was described by George Hampson in 1919. It is found in Australia, where it has been recorded from Western Australia.
