= Diadexia parodes =

Scientific classification
- Domain: Eukaryota
- Kingdom: Animalia
- Phylum: Arthropoda
- Class: Insecta
- Order: Lepidoptera
- Family: Crambidae
- Subfamily: Crambinae
- Tribe: incertae sedis
- Genus: Diadexia
- Species: D. parodes

Binomial name
- Diadexia parodes Turner, 1905

Species of moth

Diadexia parodes is a moth in the family Crambidae. It was described by Turner in 1905. It is found in Australia.
