= Eurhythma argyphea =

Scientific classification
- Domain: Eukaryota
- Kingdom: Animalia
- Phylum: Arthropoda
- Class: Insecta
- Order: Lepidoptera
- Family: Crambidae
- Subfamily: Crambinae
- Tribe: incertae sedis
- Genus: Eurhythma
- Species: E. argyphea

Binomial name
- Eurhythma argyphea (Turner, 1913)

Synonyms
- Myriostephes argyphea Turner, 1913

Species of moth

Eurhythma argyphea is a moth in the family Crambidae. It was described by Turner in 1913. It is found in Australia, in the Northern Territory.

The wingspan is about 12 mm. The forewings are snow-white with a dark-fuscous streak on the costa and a median fascia with a dark-fuscous costal half. The dorsal half is orange ochreous. There is an orange-ochreous subterminal fascia, suffused with dark-fuscous towards the apex, bounded by a waved dark-fuscous line. There is also a white dot on the costa before the apex, a white streak on the termen with a fuscous terminal edge. The hindwings are grey.
