= Schoenobiodes lanceolata =

Scientific classification
- Domain: Eukaryota
- Kingdom: Animalia
- Phylum: Arthropoda
- Class: Insecta
- Order: Lepidoptera
- Family: Crambidae
- Subfamily: Crambinae
- Tribe: incertae sedis
- Genus: Schoenobiodes
- Species: S. lanceolata

Binomial name
- Schoenobiodes lanceolata (Roepke, 1943)

Synonyms
- Stenopydna lanceolata Roepke, 1943

Species of moth

Schoenobiodes lanceolata is a moth in the family Crambidae. It was described by Roepke in 1943. It is found on Java.
