= Pseudoclasseya inopinata =

Scientific classification
- Kingdom: Animalia
- Phylum: Arthropoda
- Clade: Pancrustacea
- Class: Insecta
- Order: Lepidoptera
- Family: Crambidae
- Subfamily: Crambinae
- Tribe: Calamotrophini
- Genus: Pseudoclasseya
- Species: P. inopinata

Binomial name
- Pseudoclasseya inopinata Bassi, 1989

Species of moth

Pseudoclasseya inopinata is a moth in the family Crambidae. It was described by Graziano Bassi in 1989. It is found in Yunnan, China.
