= Eurhythma cataxia =

Scientific classification
- Domain: Eukaryota
- Kingdom: Animalia
- Phylum: Arthropoda
- Class: Insecta
- Order: Lepidoptera
- Family: Crambidae
- Subfamily: Crambinae
- Tribe: incertae sedis
- Genus: Eurhythma
- Species: E. cataxia

Binomial name
- Eurhythma cataxia (Turner, 1913)

Synonyms
- Myriostephes cataxia Turner, 1913

Species of moth

Eurhythma cataxia is a moth in the family Crambidae. It was described by Turner in 1913. It is found in Australia, where it has been recorded from the Northern Territory.

The wingspan is 9–10 mm. The forewings are snow-white with pale ochreous-fuscous fasciae. The hindwings are pale-grey.
