= Aureocramboides apollo =

Scientific classification
- Kingdom: Animalia
- Phylum: Arthropoda
- Clade: Pancrustacea
- Class: Insecta
- Order: Lepidoptera
- Family: Crambidae
- Subfamily: Crambinae
- Tribe: Crambini
- Genus: Aureocramboides
- Species: A. apollo

Binomial name
- Aureocramboides apollo Błeszyński, 1961

Species of moth

Aureocramboides apollo is a moth in the family Crambidae. It was described by Stanisław Błeszyński in 1961. It is found in Kenya.
