= Aureocramboides mopsos =

Scientific classification
- Kingdom: Animalia
- Phylum: Arthropoda
- Clade: Pancrustacea
- Class: Insecta
- Order: Lepidoptera
- Family: Crambidae
- Subfamily: Crambinae
- Tribe: Crambini
- Genus: Aureocramboides
- Species: A. mopsos

Binomial name
- Aureocramboides mopsos Bassi, 1991

Species of moth

Aureocramboides mopsos is a moth in the family Crambidae. It was described by Graziano Bassi in 1991. It is found in the Democratic Republic of the Congo.
