= Niveocatharylla romieuxi =

Scientific classification
- Kingdom: Animalia
- Phylum: Arthropoda
- Class: Insecta
- Order: Lepidoptera
- Family: Crambidae
- Subfamily: Crambinae
- Tribe: incertae sedis
- Genus: Niveocatharylla
- Species: N. romieuxi

Binomial name
- Niveocatharylla romieuxi Bassi, 1999

Species of moth

Niveocatharylla romieuxi is a moth in the family Crambidae. It was described by Graziano Bassi in 1999. It is found in the Democratic Republic of the Congo.
