= Eurhythma epargyra =

Scientific classification
- Domain: Eukaryota
- Kingdom: Animalia
- Phylum: Arthropoda
- Class: Insecta
- Order: Lepidoptera
- Family: Crambidae
- Subfamily: Crambinae
- Tribe: incertae sedis
- Genus: Eurhythma
- Species: E. epargyra

Binomial name
- Eurhythma epargyra (Turner, 1913)

Synonyms
- Myriostephes epargyra Turner, 1913

Species of moth

Eurhythma epargyra is a moth in the family Crambidae. It was described by Turner in 1913. It is found in Australia, where it has been recorded from the Northern Territories.

The wingspan is about 10 mm. The forewings are reddish-brown with silvery white fasciae. The hindwings are brown-whitish with two fine fuscous lines.
