= Cypholomia crypsibela =

Scientific classification
- Kingdom: Animalia
- Phylum: Arthropoda
- Class: Insecta
- Order: Lepidoptera
- Family: Crambidae
- Subfamily: Crambinae
- Tribe: incertae sedis
- Genus: Cypholomia
- Species: C. crypsibela

Binomial name
- Cypholomia crypsibela Meyrick, 1934

Species of moth

Cypholomia crypsibela is a moth in the family Crambidae. It was described by Edward Meyrick in 1934. It is found in the Democratic Republic of the Congo.
