= Eurhythma xuthospila =

Scientific classification
- Domain: Eukaryota
- Kingdom: Animalia
- Phylum: Arthropoda
- Class: Insecta
- Order: Lepidoptera
- Family: Crambidae
- Subfamily: Crambinae
- Tribe: incertae sedis
- Genus: Eurhythma
- Species: E. xuthospila

Binomial name
- Eurhythma xuthospila (Turner, 1913)

Synonyms
- Myriostephes xuthospila Turner, 1913

Species of moth

Eurhythma xuthospila is a moth in the family Crambidae. It was described by Turner in 1913. It is found in Australia, where it has been recorded from the Northern Territories.

The wingspan is 12–13 mm. The forewings are blackish-fuscous with orange-ochreous spots. There is a subbasal spot on the dorsum extending across the disc, as well as a large roundish spot on the mid-dorsum, a triangular spot on the costa and a smaller spot on the tornus. The hindwings are dark-fuscous.
