= Schoenobiodes strata =

Scientific classification
- Domain: Eukaryota
- Kingdom: Animalia
- Phylum: Arthropoda
- Class: Insecta
- Order: Lepidoptera
- Family: Crambidae
- Subfamily: Crambinae
- Tribe: incertae sedis
- Genus: Schoenobiodes
- Species: S. strata

Binomial name
- Schoenobiodes strata (Schultze, 1907)

Synonyms
- Acara strata Schultze, 1907

Species of moth

Schoenobiodes strata is a moth in the family Crambidae. It was described by Schultze in 1907. It is found in the Philippines.
