= Niveocatharylla bifasciella =

Scientific classification
- Domain: Eukaryota
- Kingdom: Animalia
- Phylum: Arthropoda
- Class: Insecta
- Order: Lepidoptera
- Family: Crambidae
- Subfamily: Crambinae
- Tribe: incertae sedis
- Genus: Niveocatharylla
- Species: N. bifasciella

Binomial name
- Niveocatharylla bifasciella (Snellen, 1893)

Synonyms
- Argyria (Catharylla) bifasciella Snellen, 1893

Species of moth

Niveocatharylla bifasciella is a moth in the family Crambidae. It was described by Snellen in 1893. It is found on Sulawesi.
