= Corynophora torrentellus =

Scientific classification
- Kingdom: Animalia
- Phylum: Arthropoda
- Class: Insecta
- Order: Lepidoptera
- Family: Crambidae
- Subfamily: Crambinae
- Tribe: incertae sedis
- Genus: Corynophora
- Species: C. torrentellus

Binomial name
- Corynophora torrentellus (Meyrick, 1879)

Species of moth

Corynophora torrentellus is a moth in the family Crambidae. It was described by Edward Meyrick in 1879. It is found in Australia, where it has been recorded from Queensland.

The wingspan is about 30 mm. The forewings are dark brown with white longitudinal stripes.
