= Pseudoclasseya sinuosellus =

Scientific classification
- Kingdom: Animalia
- Phylum: Arthropoda
- Clade: Pancrustacea
- Class: Insecta
- Order: Lepidoptera
- Family: Crambidae
- Subfamily: Crambinae
- Tribe: Calamotrophini
- Genus: Pseudoclasseya
- Species: P. sinuosellus

Binomial name
- Pseudoclasseya sinuosellus (South in Leech & South, 1901)

Synonyms
- Platytes sinuosellus South in Leech & South, 1901

Species of moth

Pseudoclasseya sinuosellus is a moth in the family Crambidae. It was described by South in 1901. It is found in China (Sichuan).
