= Tulla (disambiguation) =

Tulla is a town in County Clare, Ireland.

Tulla may also refer to:

== People ==
- Johann Gottfried Tulla (1770–1828), German engineer who straightened the Rhine
- Tulla Blomberg Ranslet (born 1928), Norwegian painter

== Other uses ==
- Tulla Lower, a barony in County Clare, Ireland
- Tulla Upper, a barony in County Clare, Ireland
- Tulla exonoma, a species of moth in the monotypic genus Tulla
- Loch Tulla in Scotland
- CityLink and Tullamarine Freeway In Melbourne, Victoria
