= Ubida amochla =

Scientific classification
- Domain: Eukaryota
- Kingdom: Animalia
- Phylum: Arthropoda
- Class: Insecta
- Order: Lepidoptera
- Family: Crambidae
- Subfamily: Crambinae
- Tribe: incertae sedis
- Genus: Ubida
- Species: U. amochla

Binomial name
- Ubida amochla Turner, 1922

Species of moth

Ubida amochla is a moth in the family Crambidae. It was described by Turner in 1922. It is found in Australia, where it has been recorded from Queensland.

The wingspan is 26–40 mm. The fore- and hindwings are both whitish.
