= Eurhythma polyzelota =

Scientific classification
- Domain: Eukaryota
- Kingdom: Animalia
- Phylum: Arthropoda
- Class: Insecta
- Order: Lepidoptera
- Family: Crambidae
- Subfamily: Crambinae
- Tribe: incertae sedis
- Genus: Eurhythma
- Species: E. polyzelota

Binomial name
- Eurhythma polyzelota (Turner, 1913)

Synonyms
- Myriostephes polyzelota Turner, 1913

Species of moth

Eurhythma polyzelota is a moth in the family Crambidae. It was described by Turner in 1913. It is found in Australia, where it has been recorded from the Northern Territories.

The wingspan is about 10 mm. The forewings are white with dark-fuscous fasciae partly edged with blackish. The hindwings are grey.
