= Eurhythma callipepla =

Scientific classification
- Domain: Eukaryota
- Kingdom: Animalia
- Phylum: Arthropoda
- Class: Insecta
- Order: Lepidoptera
- Family: Crambidae
- Subfamily: Crambinae
- Tribe: incertae sedis
- Genus: Eurhythma
- Species: E. callipepla

Binomial name
- Eurhythma callipepla (Turner, 1915)

Synonyms
- Myriostephes callipepla Turner, 1915

Species of moth

Eurhythma callipepla is a moth in the family Crambidae. It was described by Turner in 1915. It is found in Australia, where it has been recorded from the Northern Territories.

The wingspan is about 12 mm. The forewings are dark-fuscous with snow-white markings. The hindwings are white with a pale-fuscous line.
