= Ubida hetaerica =

Scientific classification
- Domain: Eukaryota
- Kingdom: Animalia
- Phylum: Arthropoda
- Class: Insecta
- Order: Lepidoptera
- Family: Crambidae
- Subfamily: Crambinae
- Tribe: incertae sedis
- Genus: Ubida
- Species: U. hetaerica

Binomial name
- Ubida hetaerica Turner, 1911

Species of moth

Ubida hetaerica is a moth in the family Crambidae. It was described by Turner in 1911. It is found in Australia, where it has been recorded from the Northern Territory.
