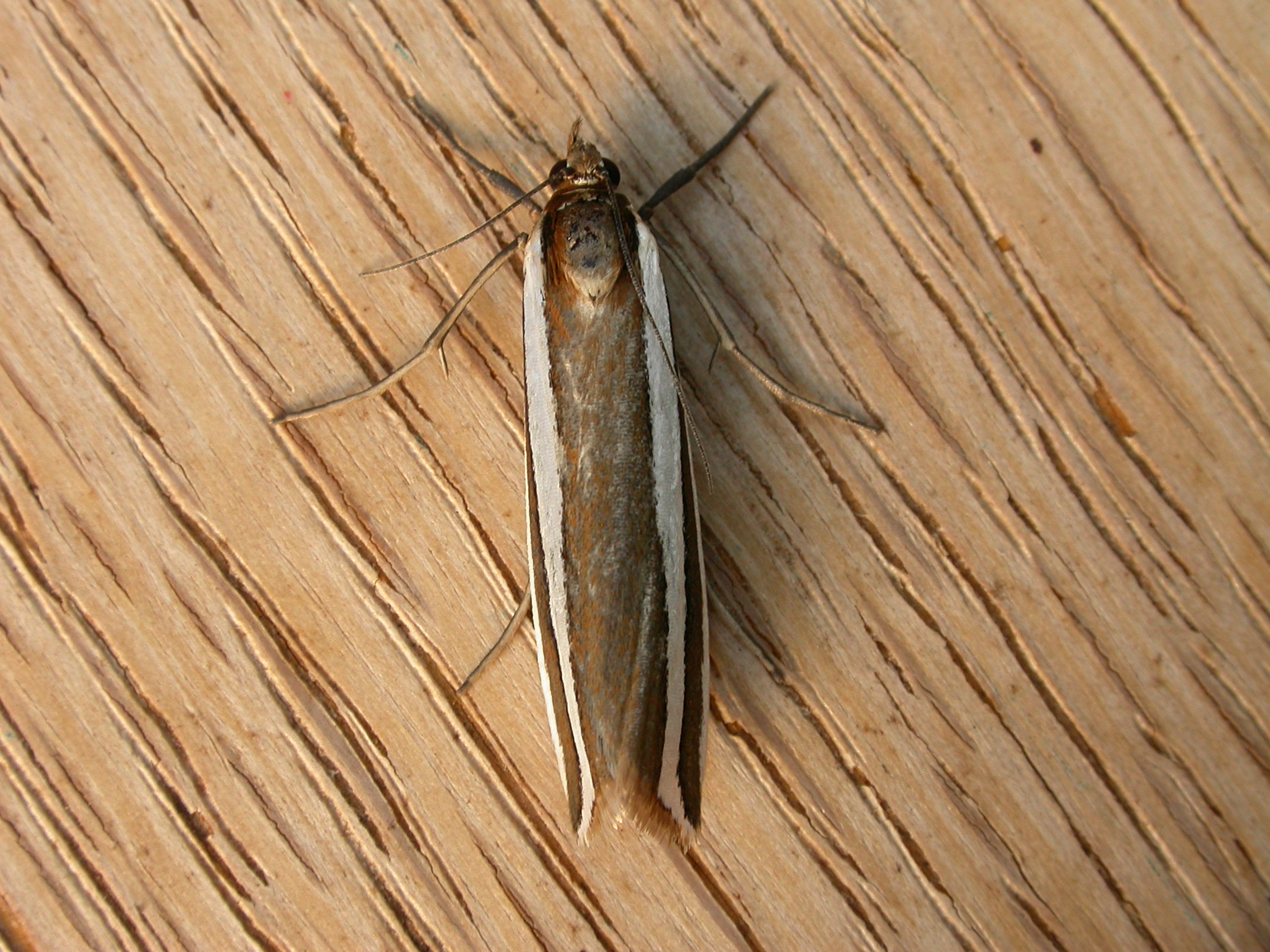

Scientific classification
- Kingdom: Animalia
- Phylum: Arthropoda
- Class: Insecta
- Order: Lepidoptera
- Family: Crambidae
- Subfamily: Crambinae
- Tribe: incertae sedis
- Genus: Corynophora
- Species: C. lativittalis

Binomial name
- Corynophora lativittalis (Walker, 1863)

= Corynophora lativittalis =

Species of moth

Corynophora lativittalis is a species of moth of the family Crambidae described by Francis Walker in 1863. It is known from eastern Australia.

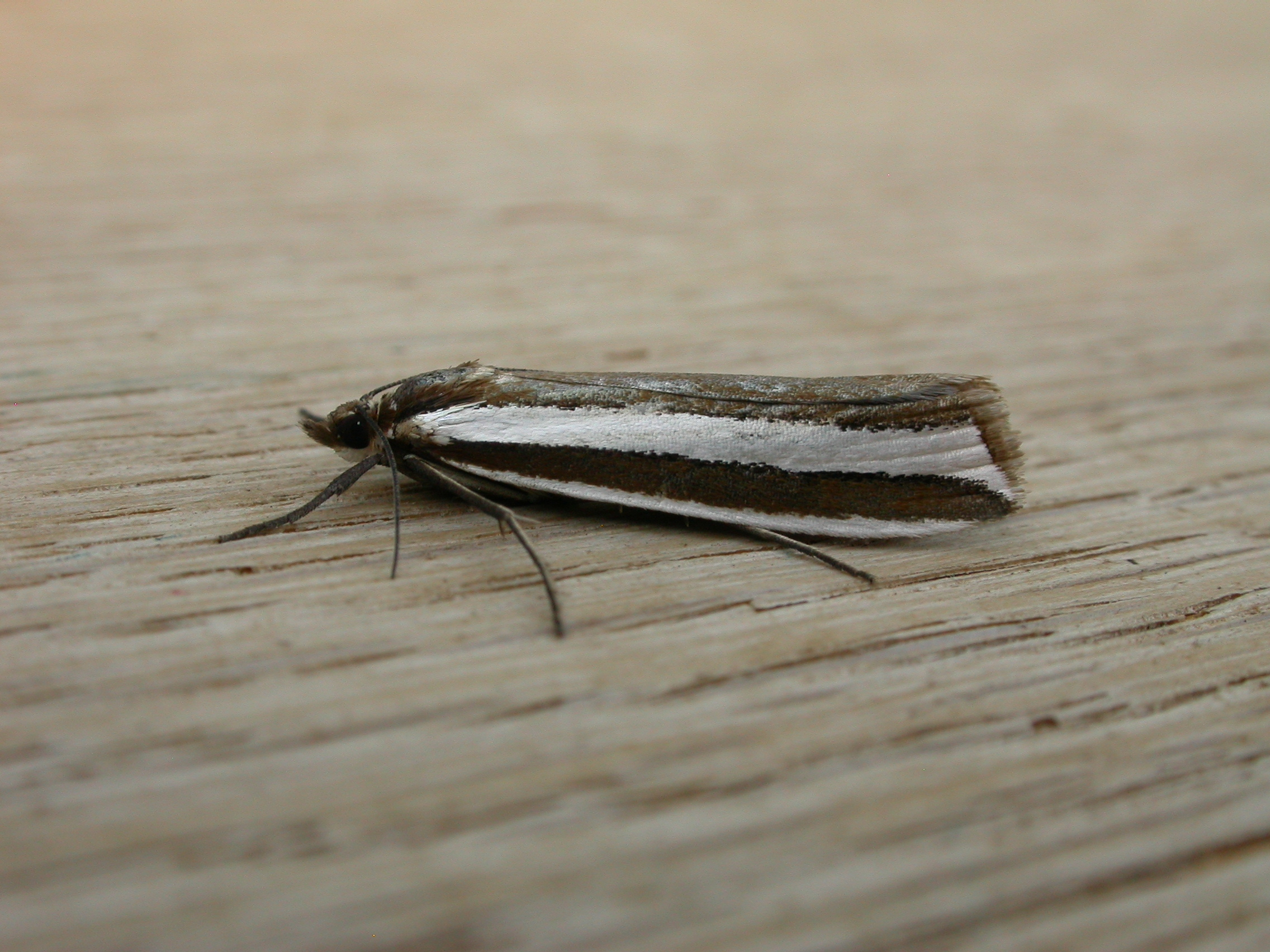
