= Neogirdharia digitata =

Scientific classification
- Kingdom: Animalia
- Phylum: Arthropoda
- Clade: Pancrustacea
- Class: Insecta
- Order: Lepidoptera
- Family: Crambidae
- Subfamily: Crambinae
- Tribe: Haimbachiini
- Genus: Neogirdharia
- Species: N. digitata

Binomial name
- Neogirdharia digitata Song & Chen in Chen, Song & Yuan, 2004

Species of moth

Neogirdharia digitata is a moth in the family Crambidae. It was described by Shi-Mei Song and Tie-Mei Chen in 2004. It is found in Yunnan, China.
