= Australargyria =

Scientific classification
- Domain: Eukaryota
- Kingdom: Animalia
- Phylum: Arthropoda
- Class: Insecta
- Order: Lepidoptera
- Family: Crambidae
- Subfamily: Crambinae
- Tribe: incertae sedis
- Genus: Australargyria; Bleszynski, 1970
- Species: A. fulvinotellus

Binomial name
- Australargyria fulvinotellus (Hampson, 1919)

Synonyms
- Crambus fulvinotellus Hampson, 1919

Genus of moths

Australargyria is a genus of moths of the family Crambidae. It contains only one species, Australargyria fulvinotellus, which is found on the Louisiade Archipelago.
