= Productalius =

Scientific classification
- Kingdom: Animalia
- Phylum: Arthropoda
- Clade: Pancrustacea
- Class: Insecta
- Order: Lepidoptera
- Family: Crambidae
- Subfamily: Crambinae
- Tribe: Crambini
- Genus: Productalius; Marion, 1954
- Species: P. tritaeniellus

Binomial name
- Productalius tritaeniellus Marion, 1954

Genus of moths

Productalius is a genus of moths of the family Crambidae. It contains only one species, Productalius tritaeniellus, which is found in Madagascar.
