= Precaffrocrambus =

Scientific classification
- Kingdom: Animalia
- Phylum: Arthropoda
- Clade: Pancrustacea
- Class: Insecta
- Order: Lepidoptera
- Family: Crambidae
- Subfamily: Crambinae
- Tribe: Crambini
- Genus: Precaffrocrambus; Bassi, 2002
- Species: P. manyarae

Binomial name
- Precaffrocrambus manyarae Bassi, 2002

Genus of moths

Precaffrocrambus is a genus of moths of the family Crambidae. It contains only one species, Precaffrocrambus manyarae, which is found in Tanzania.
