= Novocrambus =

Scientific classification
- Domain: Eukaryota
- Kingdom: Animalia
- Phylum: Arthropoda
- Class: Insecta
- Order: Lepidoptera
- Family: Crambidae
- Subfamily: Crambinae
- Tribe: Crambini
- Genus: Novocrambus; Amsel, 1956
- Species: N. propygmaeus

Binomial name
- Novocrambus propygmaeus Bleszynski, 1962

Synonyms
- Crambus minimellus Hampson, 1919 (preocc.); Crambus pygmaeus Zeller, 1881 (preocc.); Crambus violettae Bleszynski, 1962

Genus of moths

Novocrambus is a genus of moths of the family Crambidae. It contains only one species, Novocrambus propygmaeus, which is found in Colombia and Guyana.
