= Syntrita fulviferalis =

Scientific classification
- Domain: Eukaryota
- Kingdom: Animalia
- Phylum: Arthropoda
- Class: Insecta
- Order: Lepidoptera
- Family: Crambidae
- Genus: Syntrita
- Species: S. fulviferalis

Binomial name
- Syntrita fulviferalis (Dognin, 1912)

Synonyms
- Syngamia fulviferalis Dognin, 1912

Species of moth

Syntrita fulviferalis is a moth in the family Crambidae. It was described by Paul Dognin in 1912. It is found in Colombia.
