= Syntrita leucochasma =

Scientific classification
- Kingdom: Animalia
- Phylum: Arthropoda
- Class: Insecta
- Order: Lepidoptera
- Family: Crambidae
- Genus: Syntrita
- Species: S. leucochasma

Binomial name
- Syntrita leucochasma (Hampson, 1912)

Synonyms
- Pilocrocis leucochasma Hampson, 1912

Species of moth

Syntrita leucochasma is a moth in the family Crambidae. It was described by George Hampson in 1912. It is found in Peru.
