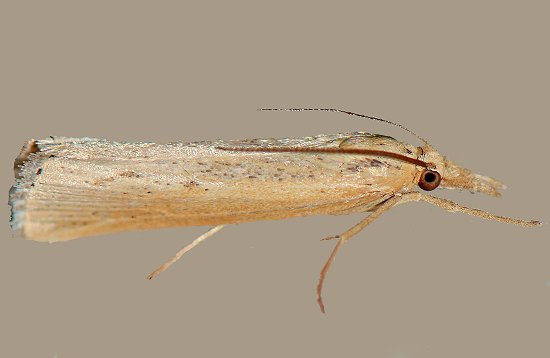

Scientific classification
- Domain: Eukaryota
- Kingdom: Animalia
- Phylum: Arthropoda
- Class: Insecta
- Order: Lepidoptera
- Family: Crambidae
- Subfamily: Crambinae
- Tribe: Crambini
- Genus: Tehama; Hulst, 1888
- Species: T. bonifatella

Binomial name
- Tehama bonifatella (Hulst, 1887)

Synonyms
- Spermatophthora bonifatella Hulst, 1887; Crambus inornatellus Walker, 1863; Crambus nevadellus Kearfott, 1908

= Tehama bonifatella =

Genus of moths

Tehama is a genus of moths of the family Crambidae. It contains only one species, Tehama bonifatella, the western lawn moth, which is found in Greenland and North America, where it has been recorded from Alberta, British Columbia, California, Colorado, Labrador, Manitoba, Nevada, Quebec and Washington. The habitat consists of grasslands.

The larvae feed on various grasses and Trifolium repens.
