= Catancyla =

Scientific classification
- Domain: Eukaryota
- Kingdom: Animalia
- Phylum: Arthropoda
- Class: Insecta
- Order: Lepidoptera
- Family: Crambidae
- Subfamily: Crambinae
- Tribe: incertae sedis
- Genus: Catancyla; Hampson, 1919
- Species: C. brunnea

Binomial name
- Catancyla brunnea Hampson, 1919

Genus of moths

Catancyla is a genus of moths of the family Crambidae. It contains only one species, Catancyla brunnea, which is found in Australia, where it has been recorded from Western Australia.
