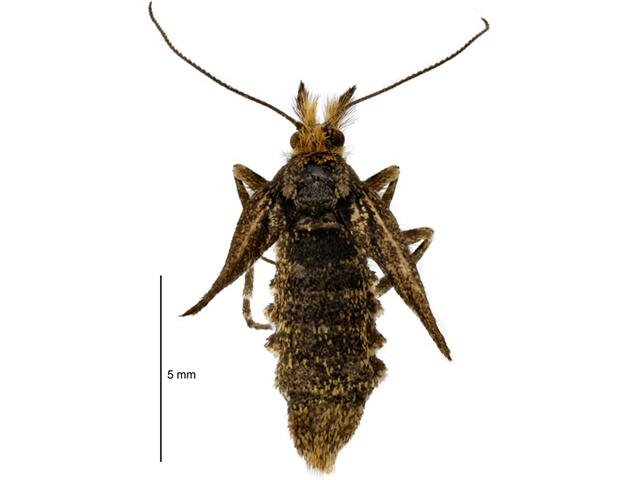
- Female
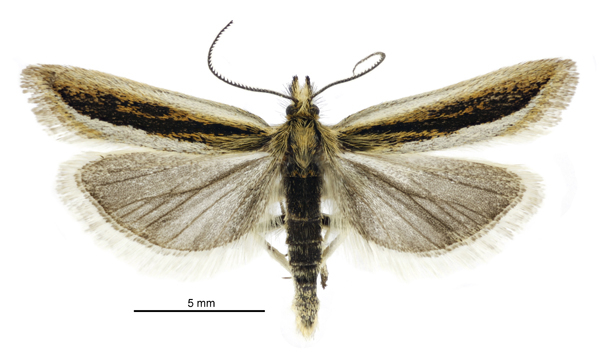
- Male

Scientific classification
- Kingdom: Animalia
- Phylum: Arthropoda
- Class: Insecta
- Order: Lepidoptera
- Family: Crambidae
- Subfamily: Crambinae
- Tribe: incertae sedis
- Genus: Protyparcha; Meyrick, 1909
- Species: P. scaphodes

Binomial name
- Protyparcha scaphodes Meyrick, 1909

= Protyparcha =

Genus of moths

Protyparcha is a genus of moths of the family Crambidae. It contains only one species, Protyparcha scaphodes, which is endemic to New Zealand, where it is known only from Auckland Islands. Both the genus and species were described by Edward Meyrick in 1909.
