= Neogirdharia =

Scientific classification
- Domain: Eukaryota
- Kingdom: Animalia
- Phylum: Arthropoda
- Class: Insecta
- Order: Lepidoptera
- Family: Crambidae
- Subfamily: Crambinae
- Tribe: Haimbachiini
- Genus: Neogirdharia; Song & Chen in Chen, Song & Yuan, 2004

Genus of moths

Neogirdharia is a genus of moths of the family Crambidae.

== Species ==
- Neogirdharia digitata Song & Chen in Chen, Song & Yuan, 2004
- Neogirdharia jingdongensis Song & Chen in Chen, Song & Yuan, 2004
- Neogirdharia magnifica Song & Chen in Chen, Song & Yuan, 2004
- Neogirdharia quadrilatera Song & Chen in Chen, Song & Yuan, 2004
- Neogirdharia rotunda Song & Chen in Chen, Song & Yuan, 2004
- Neogirdharia spiculata Song & Chen in Chen, Song & Yuan, 2004
