= Pseudoschoenobius =

Scientific classification
- Kingdom: Animalia
- Phylum: Arthropoda
- Clade: Pancrustacea
- Class: Insecta
- Order: Lepidoptera
- Family: Crambidae
- Subfamily: Crambinae
- Tribe: Ancylolomiini
- Genus: Pseudoschoenobius; Fernald, 1891
- Species: P. opalescalis

Binomial name
- Pseudoschoenobius opalescalis (Hulst, 1886)

Synonyms
- Schoenobius opalescalis Hulst, 1886; Prionopteryx griseosparsa Hampson, 1896

Genus of moths

Pseudoschoenobius is a genus of moths of the family Crambidae. It contains only one species, Pseudoschoenobius opalescalis, which is found in North America, where it has been recorded from Alberta, Illinois, Indiana, New Mexico and California. The habitat consists of dry, sandy areas.

The wingspan is about 30 mm. Adults are on wing in May and July.
