= Batiana =

Scientific classification
- Domain: Eukaryota
- Kingdom: Animalia
- Phylum: Arthropoda
- Class: Insecta
- Order: Lepidoptera
- Family: Crambidae
- Subfamily: Crambinae
- Tribe: incertae sedis
- Genus: Batiana; Walker, 1866
- Species: B. remotella

Binomial name
- Batiana remotella Walker, 1866

Genus of moths

Batiana is a genus of moths of the family Crambidae. It contains only one species, Batiana remotella, which is found in Australia, where it has been recorded from New South Wales.
