= Microcramboides =

Scientific classification
- Domain: Eukaryota
- Kingdom: Animalia
- Phylum: Arthropoda
- Class: Insecta
- Order: Lepidoptera
- Family: Crambidae
- Tribe: Crambini
- Genus: Microcramboides; Bleszynski, 1967

Genus of moths

Microcramboides is a genus of moths of the family Crambidae.

== Species ==
- Microcramboides chaparellus Bleszynski, 1967
- Microcramboides meretricella (Schaus, 1913)
