= Cleoeromene =

Scientific classification
- Domain: Eukaryota
- Kingdom: Animalia
- Phylum: Arthropoda
- Class: Insecta
- Order: Lepidoptera
- Family: Crambidae
- Subfamily: Crambinae
- Tribe: Diptychophorini
- Genus: Cleoeromene; Gaskin, 1986
- Species: C. smithi

Binomial name
- Cleoeromene smithi (H. Druce, 1896)

Synonyms
- Diptychophora smithi H. Druce, 1896; Pareromene smithi

Genus of moths

Cleoeromene is a monotypic moth genus of the family Crambidae described by David E. Gaskin in 1986. It contains only one species, Cleoeromene smithi, described by Herbert Druce in 1896 which is found in south-western Mexico, including Guerrero.

The wingspan is 15–17 mm.
