= Microcramboides chaparellus =

Scientific classification
- Domain: Eukaryota
- Kingdom: Animalia
- Phylum: Arthropoda
- Class: Insecta
- Order: Lepidoptera
- Family: Crambidae
- Genus: Microcramboides
- Species: M. chaparellus

Binomial name
- Microcramboides chaparellus Błeszyński, 1967

Species of moth

Microcramboides chaparellus is a moth in the family Crambidae. It was described by Stanisław Błeszyński in 1967. It is found in Bolivia.
