= Stenorista elongalis =

Scientific classification
- Domain: Eukaryota
- Kingdom: Animalia
- Phylum: Arthropoda
- Class: Insecta
- Order: Lepidoptera
- Family: Crambidae
- Genus: Stenorista
- Species: S. elongalis

Binomial name
- Stenorista elongalis Dognin, 1905

Species of moth

Stenorista elongalis is a moth in the family Crambidae. It was described by Paul Dognin in 1905. It is found in Loja Province, Ecuador.
