= Pseudopediasia =

Scientific classification
- Domain: Eukaryota
- Kingdom: Animalia
- Phylum: Arthropoda
- Class: Insecta
- Order: Lepidoptera
- Family: Crambidae
- Tribe: Crambini
- Genus: Pseudopediasia; Bleszynski, 1963

Genus of moths

Pseudopediasia is a genus of moths of the family Crambidae.

== Species ==
- Pseudopediasia amathusia Bleszynski, 1963
- Pseudopediasia calamellus (Hampson, 1919)
- Pseudopediasia diana Bleszynski, 1963
