= Chilandrus =

Scientific classification
- Kingdom: Animalia
- Phylum: Arthropoda
- Clade: Pancrustacea
- Class: Insecta
- Order: Lepidoptera
- Family: Crambidae
- Subfamily: Crambinae
- Tribe: Chiloini
- Genus: Chilandrus; Bleszynski, 1970
- Species: C. chrysistes

Binomial name
- Chilandrus chrysistes (Meyrick, 1933)

Synonyms
- Schoenobius chrysistes Meyrick, 1933

Genus of moths

Chilandrus is a genus of moths of the family Crambidae. It contains only one species, Chilandrus chrysistes, which is found in India (Madras).
