= Microtalis =

Scientific classification
- Domain: Eukaryota
- Kingdom: Animalia
- Phylum: Arthropoda
- Class: Insecta
- Order: Lepidoptera
- Family: Crambidae
- Subfamily: Crambinae
- Tribe: incertae sedis
- Genus: Microtalis; Turner, 1911
- Species: M. epimetalla

Binomial name
- Microtalis epimetalla Turner, 1911

Synonyms
- Metasia ecbleta Turner, 1915

Genus of moths

Microtalis is a genus of moths of the family Crambidae. It contains only one species, Microtalis epimetalla, which is found in Australia, where it has been recorded from Northern Territories.
