= Aphrophantis =

Scientific classification
- Kingdom: Animalia
- Phylum: Arthropoda
- Class: Insecta
- Order: Lepidoptera
- Family: Crambidae
- Subfamily: Crambinae
- Tribe: incertae sedis
- Genus: Aphrophantis; Meyrick, 1933
- Species: A. velifera

Binomial name
- Aphrophantis velifera Meyrick, 1933

Synonyms
- Argyria tridentata Meyrick, 1934

Genus of moths

Aphrophantis is a genus of moths of the family Crambidae. It contains only one species, Aphrophantis velifera, which is found on Fiji.
