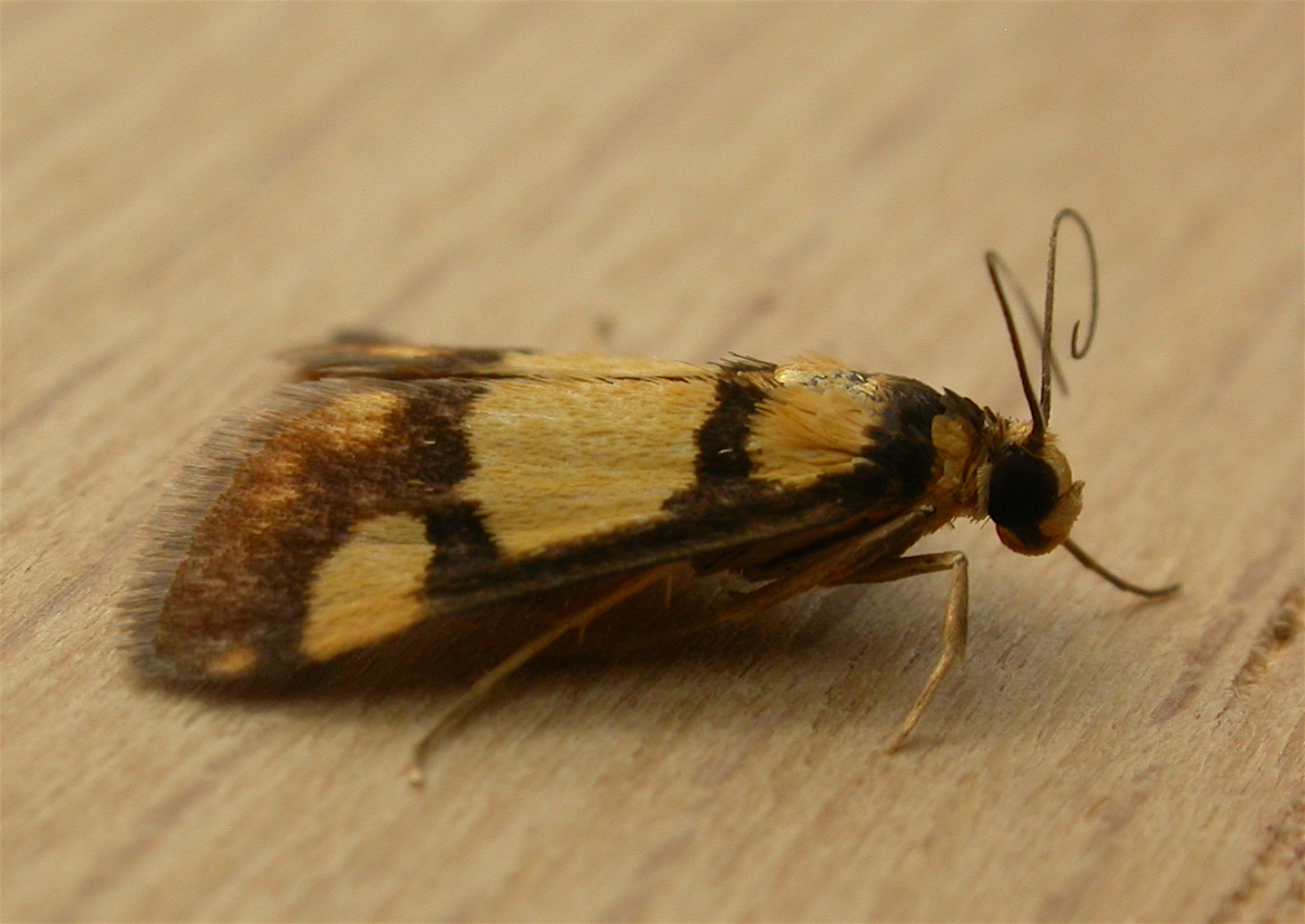

Scientific classification
- Kingdom: Animalia
- Phylum: Arthropoda
- Class: Insecta
- Order: Lepidoptera
- Family: Crambidae
- Genus: Deuterarcha
- Species: D. xanthomela

Binomial name
- Deuterarcha xanthomela Meyrick, 1884

Synonyms
- Emprepes insignis Butler, 1886

= Deuterarcha xanthomela =

Species of moth

Deuterarcha xanthomela is a moth of the family Crambidae described by Edward Meyrick in 1884. It is found in Australia.

== Gallery ==
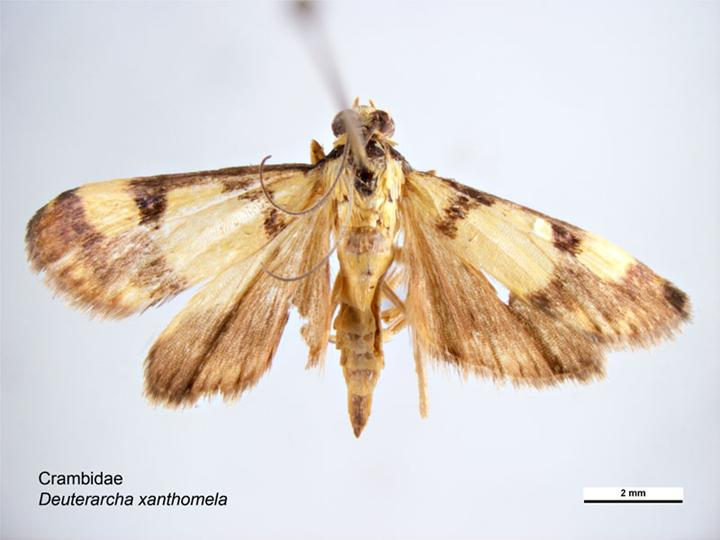
Dorsal view

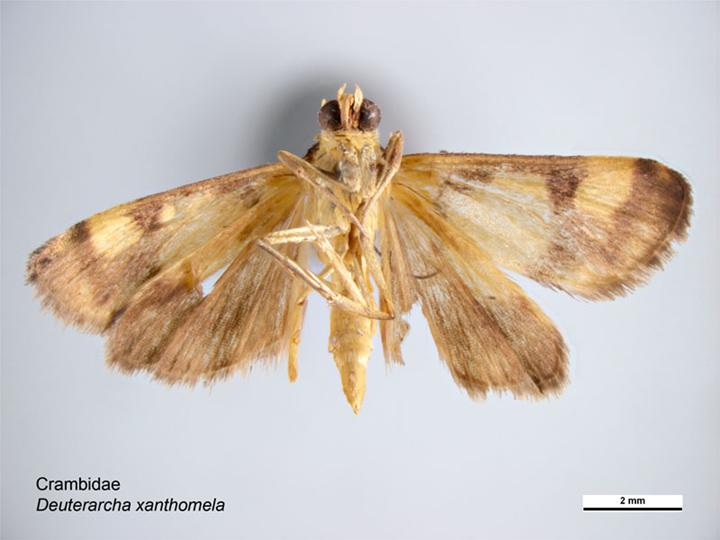
Ventral view
