= Prionapteron =

Scientific classification
- Domain: Eukaryota
- Kingdom: Animalia
- Phylum: Arthropoda
- Class: Insecta
- Order: Lepidoptera
- Family: Crambidae
- Subfamily: Crambinae
- Tribe: Ancylolomiini
- Genus: Prionapteron; Błeszyński, 1965
- Species: P. tenebrella

Binomial name
- Prionapteron tenebrella (Hampson, 1896)

Synonyms
- Mesolia tenebrella Hampson, 1896; Prionopteryx sinensis Hampson, 1919

Genus of moths

Prionapteron is a monotypic moth genus of the family Crambidae described by Stanisław Błeszyński in 1965. It contains only one species, Prionapteron tenebrella, described by George Hampson in 1896. It is found in China (Hubei, Sichuan, Shaanxi, Fujian, Guangdong).
