= Cypholomia =

Scientific classification
- Domain: Eukaryota
- Kingdom: Animalia
- Phylum: Arthropoda
- Class: Insecta
- Order: Lepidoptera
- Family: Crambidae
- Subfamily: Crambinae
- Tribe: incertae sedis
- Genus: Cypholomia; Meyrick, 1933

Synonyms
- Charitopepla Meyrick, 1933

Genus of moths

Cypholomia is a genus of moths of the family Crambidae.

== Species ==
- Cypholomia amphiaula Meyrick, 1934
- Cypholomia crypsibela Meyrick, 1934
- Cypholomia drosocapna (Meyrick, 1933)
- Cypholomia leptodeta Meyrick, 1933
