= Occidentalia =

Scientific classification
- Domain: Eukaryota
- Kingdom: Animalia
- Phylum: Arthropoda
- Class: Insecta
- Order: Lepidoptera
- Family: Crambidae
- Subfamily: Crambinae
- Tribe: Haimbachiini
- Genus: Occidentalia; Dyar & Heinrich, 1927
- Species: O. comptulatalis

Binomial name
- Occidentalia comptulatalis (Hulst, 1886)

Synonyms
- Crambus comptulatalis Hulst, 1886; Acigona comptulatalis

Genus of moths

Occidentalia is a monotypic moth genus of the family Crambidae described by Harrison Gray Dyar Jr. and Carl Heinrich in 1927. It contains only one species, Occidentalia comptulatalis, described by George Duryea Hulst in 1886. It is found in North America, where it has been recorded from Alberta, Indiana, Maine, Manitoba, Minnesota, New York, Ontario, Quebec and Saskatchewan.

The wingspan is 23–26 mm. Adults are on wing from mid-July to August in one generation per year.

The larvae feed on Scirpus acutus, Scirpus americanus and Scirpus validus.
