= Demobotys pervulgalis =

Scientific classification
- Kingdom: Animalia
- Phylum: Arthropoda
- Clade: Pancrustacea
- Class: Insecta
- Order: Lepidoptera
- Family: Crambidae
- Genus: Demobotys
- Species: D. pervulgalis

Binomial name
- Demobotys pervulgalis (Hampson, 1913)

Synonyms
- Pyrausta pervulgalis Hampson, 1913

Species of moth

Demobotys pervulgalis is a moth in the family Crambidae. It was described by George Hampson in 1913. It is found in Japan and China.

== Subspecies ==
- Demobotys pervulgalis pervulgalis (Japan)
- Demobotys pervulgalis exigua Munroe & Mutuura, 1969 (China: Nanjing)
- Demobotys pervulgalis hunana Munroe & Mutuura, 1969 (China: Hunan)
