= Libuna =

Scientific classification
- Domain: Eukaryota
- Kingdom: Animalia
- Phylum: Arthropoda
- Class: Insecta
- Order: Lepidoptera
- Family: Crambidae
- Subfamily: Crambinae
- Tribe: incertae sedis
- Genus: Libuna; Moore, 1886
- Species: L. solitella

Binomial name
- Libuna solitella (Walker, 1866)

Synonyms
- Bulina Walker, 1866

Genus of moths

Libuna is a monotypic moth genus of the family Crambidae described by Frederic Moore in 1886. It contains only one species, Libuna solitella, described by Francis Walker in 1866, which is found in Sri Lanka.
