= Pseudopediasia calamellus =

Scientific classification
- Kingdom: Animalia
- Phylum: Arthropoda
- Class: Insecta
- Order: Lepidoptera
- Family: Crambidae
- Genus: Pseudopediasia
- Species: P. calamellus

Binomial name
- Pseudopediasia calamellus (Hampson, 1919)

Synonyms
- Crambus calamellus Hampson, 1919

Species of moth

Pseudopediasia calamellus is a moth in the family Crambidae. It was described by George Hampson in 1919. It is found in Argentina.
