= Demobotys monoceralis =

Scientific classification
- Kingdom: Animalia
- Phylum: Arthropoda
- Clade: Pancrustacea
- Class: Insecta
- Order: Lepidoptera
- Family: Crambidae
- Genus: Demobotys
- Species: D. monoceralis

Binomial name
- Demobotys monoceralis Munroe & Mutuura, 1969

Species of moth

Demobotys monoceralis is a moth in the family Crambidae. It was described by Eugene G. Munroe and Akira Mutuura in 1969. It is found in Yunnan, China.
