= Miraxis =

Scientific classification
- Domain: Eukaryota
- Kingdom: Animalia
- Phylum: Arthropoda
- Class: Insecta
- Order: Lepidoptera
- Family: Crambidae
- Subfamily: Crambinae
- Tribe: Crambini
- Genus: Miraxis; Bleszynski, 1962
- Species: M. klotsi

Binomial name
- Miraxis klotsi Bleszynski, 1962

Genus of moths

Miraxis is a genus of moths of the family Crambidae. It contains only one species, Miraxis klotsi, which is found in Peru.
