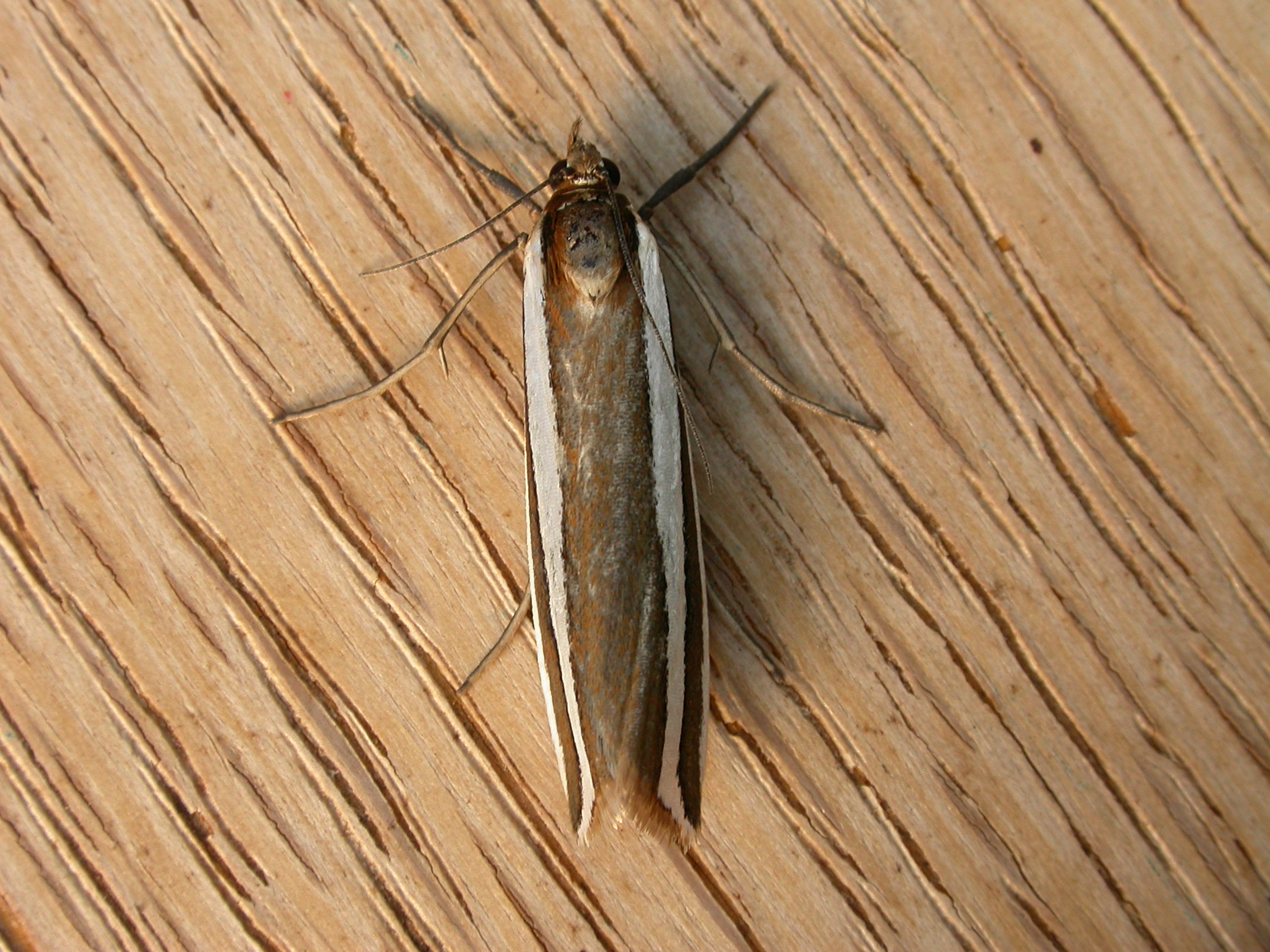
- Corynophora lativittalis

Scientific classification
- Domain: Eukaryota
- Kingdom: Animalia
- Phylum: Arthropoda
- Class: Insecta
- Order: Lepidoptera
- Family: Crambidae
- Subfamily: Crambinae
- Tribe: incertae sedis
- Genus: Corynophora; Berg, 1898

Synonyms
- Halterophora Meyrick, 1897

= Corynophora =

Genus of moths

Corynophora is a genus of moths of the family Crambidae.

== Species ==
- Corynophora argentifascia (Hampson, 1919)
- Corynophora lativittalis (Walker, 1863)
- Corynophora torrentellus (Meyrick, 1879)
