= Crambixon =

Scientific classification
- Domain: Eukaryota
- Kingdom: Animalia
- Phylum: Arthropoda
- Class: Insecta
- Order: Lepidoptera
- Family: Crambidae
- Subfamily: Crambinae
- Tribe: Crambini
- Genus: Crambixon; Bleszynski, 1965
- Species: C. zarathustra

Binomial name
- Crambixon zarathustra Bleszynski, 1965

Genus of moths

Crambixon is a genus of moths of the family Crambidae. It contains only one species, Crambixon zarathustra, which is found in Afghanistan.
