= Neopediasia =

Scientific classification
- Domain: Eukaryota
- Kingdom: Animalia
- Phylum: Arthropoda
- Class: Insecta
- Order: Lepidoptera
- Family: Crambidae
- Subfamily: Crambinae
- Tribe: Crambini
- Genus: Neopediasia; Okano, 1962
- Species: N. mixtalis

Binomial name
- Neopediasia mixtalis (Walker, 1863)

Synonyms
- Crambus mixtalis Walker, 1863; Crambus atrisquamalis Hampson, 1900; Crambus atrisquamalis f. rubra Caradja & Meyrick, 1935; Crambus atrisquamalis f. rubrotinctus Caradja & Meyrick, 1937; Crambus columbinellus South in Leech & South, 1901; Crambus trimarginipunctus Filipjev, 1927; Crambus trimarginepunctus Bleszynski & Collins, 1962

Genus of moths

Neopediasia is a monotypic moth genus of the family Crambidae described by Masao Okano in 1962. Its only species, Neopediasia mixtalis, described by Francis Walker in 1863, is found in the Russian Far East, China (Sichuan, Shaanxi, Yunnan, Shandong, Gansu, Jiangsu, Manchuria), Korea and Japan.

The wingspan is 10–13 mm.

The larvae feed on Panicum species.
