= Parancyla =

Scientific classification
- Domain: Eukaryota
- Kingdom: Animalia
- Phylum: Arthropoda
- Class: Insecta
- Order: Lepidoptera
- Family: Crambidae
- Subfamily: Crambinae
- Tribe: incertae sedis
- Genus: Parancyla; Hampson, 1919
- Species: P. argyrothysana

Binomial name
- Parancyla argyrothysana Hampson, 1919

Genus of moths

Parancyla is a monotypic moth genus of the family Crambidae described by George Hampson in 1919. Its single species, Parancyla argyrothysana, described in the same article, is found in Malawi's Mount Mulanje.
