= Incaeromene =

Scientific classification
- Domain: Eukaryota
- Kingdom: Animalia
- Phylum: Arthropoda
- Class: Insecta
- Order: Lepidoptera
- Family: Crambidae
- Subfamily: Crambinae
- Tribe: Diptychophorini
- Genus: Incaeromene; Gaskin, 1986
- Species: I. subuncusella

Binomial name
- Incaeromene subuncusella Gaskin, 1986

Genus of moths

Incaeromene is a monotypic moth genus of the family Crambidae described by David E. Gaskin in 1986. Its only species, Incaeromene subuncusella, described in the same article, is found in Peru.

The wingspan is about 15 mm. The ground colour of the forewings is silvery white. The hindwings are pure silvery white.

== Etymology ==
The genus name is derived from Inca (pertaining to the Incas) and Greek eromene (meaning mistress).
