= Syntrita nimalis =

Scientific classification
- Domain: Eukaryota
- Kingdom: Animalia
- Phylum: Arthropoda
- Class: Insecta
- Order: Lepidoptera
- Family: Crambidae
- Genus: Syntrita
- Species: S. nimalis

Binomial name
- Syntrita nimalis (Schaus, 1924)

Synonyms
- Dichocrocis nimalis Schaus, 1924

Species of moth

Syntrita nimalis is a moth in the family Crambidae. It was described by William Schaus in 1924. It is found in Bolivia.

The wingspan is about 20 mm. The forewings are thinly scaled iridescent grey brown, the base darker and with two small spots antemedially in the cell, and with two streaks medially, with whitish shades around them. There is a darker streak on the discocellular, somewhat divided by a whitish line. There is a subterminal broad white line from the costa to vein 5. There is whitish shading terminally, and small brown spots on the interspaces. The hindwings are semihyaline white, the costal margin and the termen broadly greyish brown, crossed by a wavy subterminal white line. There is a terminal white line.
