= Haplopediasia =

Scientific classification
- Domain: Eukaryota
- Kingdom: Animalia
- Phylum: Arthropoda
- Class: Insecta
- Order: Lepidoptera
- Family: Crambidae
- Subfamily: Crambinae
- Tribe: Crambini
- Genus: Haplopediasia; Bleszynski, 1963
- Species: H. aurantilineellus

Binomial name
- Haplopediasia aurantilineellus (Hampson, 1896)

Synonyms
- Crambus aurantilineellus Hampson, 1896

Genus of moths

Haplopediasia is a genus of moths of the family Crambidae. It contains only one species, Haplopediasia aurantilineellus, which is found in Brazil (São Paulo).
