= Malgasochilo =

Scientific classification
- Domain: Eukaryota
- Kingdom: Animalia
- Phylum: Arthropoda
- Class: Insecta
- Order: Lepidoptera
- Family: Crambidae
- Subfamily: Crambinae
- Tribe: Chiloini
- Genus: Malgasochilo; Bleszynski, 1970
- Species: M. autarotellus

Binomial name
- Malgasochilo autarotellus Błeszyński, 1970

Genus of moths

Malgasochilo is a genus of moths of the family Crambidae. It contains only one species, Malgasochilo autarotellus, which is found in Madagascar (Nosy Be). The forewings of this species are dull-greyish brown with a length of 12 mm.

== See also ==
- List of moths of Madagascar
