= Aureocramboides =

Scientific classification
- Kingdom: Animalia
- Phylum: Arthropoda
- Clade: Pancrustacea
- Class: Insecta
- Order: Lepidoptera
- Family: Crambidae
- Subfamily: Crambinae
- Tribe: Crambini
- Genus: Aureocramboides; Bleszynski, 1961

Genus of moths

Aureocramboides is a genus of moths of the family Crambidae.

== Species ==
- Aureocramboides apollo Bleszynski, 1961
- Aureocramboides mopsos Bassi, 1991
