= Japonichilo =

Scientific classification
- Domain: Eukaryota
- Kingdom: Animalia
- Phylum: Arthropoda
- Class: Insecta
- Order: Lepidoptera
- Family: Crambidae
- Subfamily: Crambinae
- Tribe: incertae sedis
- Genus: Japonichilo; Okano, 1962
- Species: J. bleszynskii

Binomial name
- Japonichilo bleszynskii Okano, 1962

Genus of moths

Japonichilo is a monotypic moth genus of the family Crambidae described by Masao Okano in 1962. It contains only one species, Japonichilo bleszynskii, described in the same article, which is found in Japan (Honshu), China (Sichuan, Jiangsu, Manchuria) and the Russian Far East (Ussuri).
