= Microcramboides meretricella =

Scientific classification
- Domain: Eukaryota
- Kingdom: Animalia
- Phylum: Arthropoda
- Class: Insecta
- Order: Lepidoptera
- Family: Crambidae
- Genus: Microcramboides
- Species: M. meretricella

Binomial name
- Microcramboides meretricella (Schaus, 1913)

Synonyms
- Crambus meretricella Schaus, 1913

Species of moth

Microcramboides meretricella is a moth in the family Crambidae. It was described by Schaus in 1913. It is found in Costa Rica.
