= Japonicrambus mitsundoi =

Scientific classification
- Kingdom: Animalia
- Phylum: Arthropoda
- Clade: Pancrustacea
- Class: Insecta
- Order: Lepidoptera
- Family: Crambidae
- Genus: Japonicrambus
- Species: J. mitsundoi

Binomial name
- Japonicrambus mitsundoi Sasaki & Jinbo, 2002

Species of moth

Japonicrambus mitsundoi is a moth in the family Crambidae. It was described by Akio Sasaki and Utsugi Jinbo in 2002. It is found in Honshu, Japan.
