= Deltobotys brachypteralis =

Scientific classification
- Kingdom: Animalia
- Phylum: Arthropoda
- Class: Insecta
- Order: Lepidoptera
- Family: Crambidae
- Genus: Deltobotys
- Species: D. brachypteralis

Binomial name
- Deltobotys brachypteralis (Hampson, 1913)

Synonyms
- Pyrausta brachypteralis Hampson, 1913; Hapalia lunilinealis Hampson, 1918; Hapalia levilinealis Amsel, 1956

Species of moth

Deltobotys brachypteralis is a moth in the family Crambidae. It was described by George Hampson in 1913. It is found in Ecuador and Paraguay.
