= Haploplatytes =

Scientific classification
- Kingdom: Animalia
- Phylum: Arthropoda
- Clade: Pancrustacea
- Class: Insecta
- Order: Lepidoptera
- Family: Crambidae
- Subfamily: Crambinae
- Tribe: Crambini
- Genus: Haploplatytes; Bleszynski, 1966
- Species: H. moluccellus

Binomial name
- Haploplatytes moluccellus Bleszynski, 1966

Genus of moths

Haploplatytes is a genus of moths of the family Crambidae. It contains only one species, Haploplatytes moluccellus, which is found on the Moluccas.
