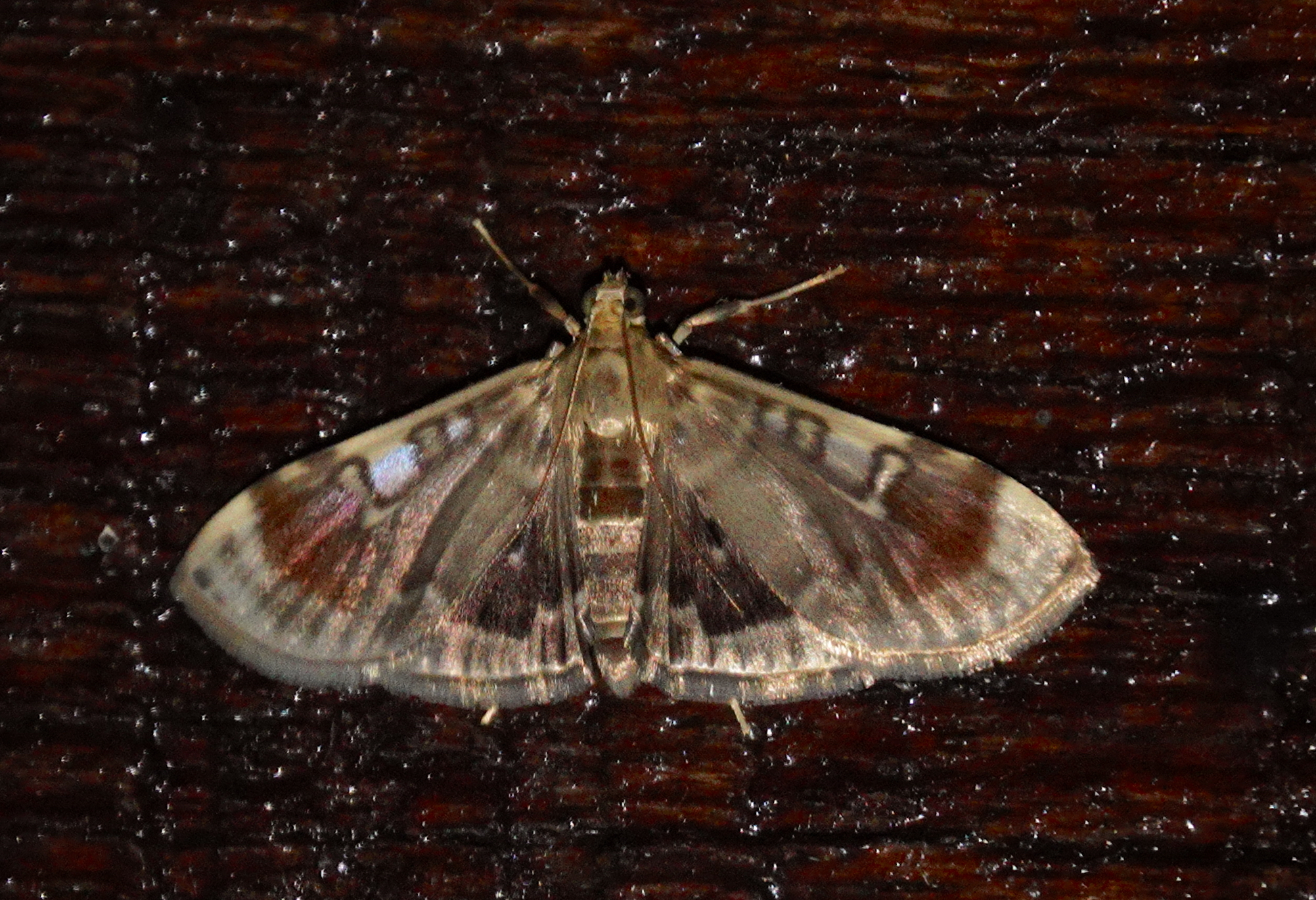

Scientific classification
- Domain: Eukaryota
- Kingdom: Animalia
- Phylum: Arthropoda
- Class: Insecta
- Order: Lepidoptera
- Family: Crambidae
- Genus: Syntrita
- Species: S. umbralis

Binomial name
- Syntrita umbralis Dognin, 1905

= Syntrita umbralis =

Species of moth

Syntrita umbralis is a species of moth in the family Crambidae. It was first described by Paul Dognin in 1905. It is found in Loja Province, Ecuador.
