= Sarabotys cupreicostalis =

Scientific classification
- Domain: Eukaryota
- Kingdom: Animalia
- Phylum: Arthropoda
- Class: Insecta
- Order: Lepidoptera
- Family: Crambidae
- Genus: Sarabotys
- Species: S. cupreicostalis

Binomial name
- Sarabotys cupreicostalis (Dyar, 1913)

Synonyms
- Phlyctaenodes cupreicostalis Dyar, 1913; Loxostege cupreicostalis

Species of moth

Sarabotys cupreicostalis is a moth in the family Crambidae. It is found in Mexico (Guerrero, Puebla, Jalisco, Chiapas, Sonora) and Venezuela.

The wingspan is 21–27 mm for males and about 25 mm for females. The wings are pale yellow, somewhat lustrous and subhyaline. The markings are brownish. Adults are on wing from May to October.
