= Neargyrioides =

Scientific classification
- Domain: Eukaryota
- Kingdom: Animalia
- Phylum: Arthropoda
- Class: Insecta
- Order: Lepidoptera
- Family: Crambidae
- Subfamily: Crambinae
- Tribe: incertae sedis
- Genus: Neargyrioides; Bleszynski, 1970
- Species: N. aglaopis

Binomial name
- Neargyrioides aglaopis (Turner, 1911)

Synonyms
- Chilo aglaopis Turner, 1911

Genus of moths

Neargyrioides is a genus of moths of the family Crambidae. It contains only one species, Neargyrioides aglaopis, which is found in Australia, where it has been recorded from the Northern Territory and Queensland.
