= Stenorista fortunata =

Scientific classification
- Domain: Eukaryota
- Kingdom: Animalia
- Phylum: Arthropoda
- Class: Insecta
- Order: Lepidoptera
- Family: Crambidae
- Genus: Stenorista
- Species: S. fortunata

Binomial name
- Stenorista fortunata (Schaus, 1912)

Synonyms
- Sameodes fortunata Schaus, 1912

Species of moth

Stenorista fortunata is a moth in the family Crambidae. It was described by Schaus in 1912. It is found in Costa Rica.

The wingspan is about 22 mm. The forewings are whitish, the basal third of the costa and cell shaded with brown. There are yellow-buff shades basally below the cell and a broad antemedial, irregular, fuscous shade, as well as a dark brown medial line, followed in the cell by a fuscous shade and a yellow-buff spot, outwardly limited by a dark curved line. There is also a dark line from the cell along vein 2, then wavy to the inner margin. Across the discocellular runs a yellow-buff, incurved crescent which is finely edged with brown. The points of this crescent are semi-connected by small brown and yellowish spots beyond the cell, which form part of a postmedial punctiform line. There is a broad subapical fuscous-brown shade along the costa to the marginal line at vein 5. The latter is also fuscous brown. Both are edged inwardly and along the termen with yellow-buff. The veins are partly shaded with yellow-buff. The hindwings have a marginal line, which is broader from below the costa, upbent along the inner margin and coalesces with a spot below vein 2. There is a fine downbent postmedial line and there are yellow shadings along the marginal line, which is irrorated with silvery-grey scales. A terminal dark line and points on are found on both wings.
