= Ubida holomochla =

Scientific classification
- Domain: Eukaryota
- Kingdom: Animalia
- Phylum: Arthropoda
- Class: Insecta
- Order: Lepidoptera
- Family: Crambidae
- Genus: Ubida
- Species: U. holomochla

Binomial name
- Ubida holomochla Turner, 1904

Species of moth

Ubida holomochla is a moth in the family Crambidae. It was described by Turner in 1904. It is found in Australia, where it has been recorded from Queensland and the Northern Territory.

The forewings are white with dark brown stripes. The hindwings are white.
