= Neocrambus =

Scientific classification
- Kingdom: Animalia
- Phylum: Arthropoda
- Class: Insecta
- Order: Lepidoptera
- Family: Crambidae
- Subfamily: Crambinae
- Tribe: Crambini
- Genus: Neocrambus; Bleszynski, 1957
- Species: N. wolfschlaegeri

Binomial name
- Neocrambus wolfschlaegeri (Schawerda, 1937)

Synonyms
- Crambus wolfschlaegeri Schawerda, 1937

Genus of moths

Neocrambus is a genus of moths of the family Crambidae. It contains only one species, Neocrambus wolfschlaegeri, it is found in North Macedonia, Greece and Kurdistan.
