= Thalamarchis =

Scientific classification
- Kingdom: Animalia
- Phylum: Arthropoda
- Clade: Pancrustacea
- Class: Insecta
- Order: Lepidoptera
- Family: Crambidae
- Subfamily: Crambinae
- Tribe: incertae sedis
- Genus: Thalamarchis; Meyrick, 1897
- Species: T. chalchorma

Binomial name
- Thalamarchis chalchorma Meyrick, 1897

Genus of moths

The concealer moth genus invalidly named Thalamarchis by Meyrick in 1904 has been renamed Thalamarchella.

Thalamarchis is a genus of grass moths (family Crambidae). It is monotypic, with a single species Thalamarchis chalchorma. It is known from Sangir in the Malay Archipelago.

The wingspan is about 16 mm.
