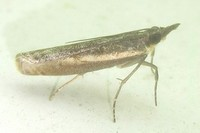

Scientific classification
- Kingdom: Animalia
- Phylum: Arthropoda
- Clade: Pancrustacea
- Class: Insecta
- Order: Lepidoptera
- Family: Crambidae
- Subfamily: Crambinae
- Tribe: Crambini
- Genus: Conocramboides; Błeszyński, 1970
- Species: C. seychellellus

Binomial name
- Conocramboides seychellellus (T. B. Fletcher, 1910)

Synonyms
- Conocramboides emmerezellus (de Joannis, 1915); Conocramboides seychellellus subsp. emmerezellus (Joannis, 1915); Crambus emmerezellus Joannis, 1915; Crambus seychellellus Fletcher, 1910; Crambus seychellellus subsp. emmerezellus Joannis, 1915

= Conocramboides =

Genus of moths

Conocramboides is a monotypic moth genus of the family Crambidae described by Stanisław Błeszyński in 1970. Its only species, Conocramboides seychellellus, described by Thomas Bainbrigge Fletcher in 1910, is found in the Seychelles, Réunion and in Mauritius.

== Subspecies ==
- Conocramboides seychellellus seychellellus from Seychelles
- Conocramboides seychellellus emmerezellus (de Joannis, 1915) from La Réunion and Mauritius

== Ecology ==
Food plants of the larvae of this species are Poaceae (Cynodon dactylon, Axonopus compressus, Digitaria didactyla, Zoysia matrella and Cynodon dactylon)
