= Micronix =

Scientific classification
- Domain: Eukaryota
- Kingdom: Animalia
- Phylum: Arthropoda
- Class: Insecta
- Order: Lepidoptera
- Family: Crambidae
- Subfamily: Crambinae
- Tribe: incertae sedis
- Genus: Micronix; Amsel, 1956
- Species: M. nivalis

Binomial name
- Micronix nivalis Amsel, 1956

Genus of moths

Micronix is a genus of moths of the family Crambidae. It contains only one species, Micronix nivalis, which is found in Venezuela.
