= Pseudoclasseya =

Scientific classification
- Kingdom: Animalia
- Phylum: Arthropoda
- Clade: Pancrustacea
- Class: Insecta
- Order: Lepidoptera
- Family: Crambidae
- Subfamily: Crambinae
- Tribe: Calamotrophini
- Genus: Pseudoclasseya; Bleszynski, 1964

Genus of moths

Pseudoclasseya is a genus of moths of the family Crambidae.

== Species ==
- Pseudoclasseya inopinata Bassi, 1989
- Pseudoclasseya minuta Bassi, 1989
- Pseudoclasseya mirabilis Bassi, 1989
- Pseudoclasseya sinuosellus (South in Leech & South, 1901)
