= Lyndia =

Scientific classification
- Domain: Eukaryota
- Kingdom: Animalia
- Phylum: Arthropoda
- Class: Insecta
- Order: Lepidoptera
- Family: Crambidae
- Subfamily: Crambinae
- Tribe: incertae sedis
- Genus: Lyndia; Savigny, 1816
- Species: L. cannarum

Binomial name
- Lyndia cannarum Savigny, 1816

Genus of moths

Lyndia is a genus of moths of the family Crambidae. It contains only one species, Lyndia cannarum, which is found in Egypt.
