= Deuterarcha flavalis =

Scientific classification
- Kingdom: Animalia
- Phylum: Arthropoda
- Class: Insecta
- Order: Lepidoptera
- Family: Crambidae
- Genus: Deuterarcha
- Species: D. flavalis

Binomial name
- Deuterarcha flavalis Hampson, 1893

Species of moth

Deuterarcha flavalis is a moth of the family Crambidae described by George Hampson in 1893.

Hampson described the species as:

Expanse 1 1/4 inch. Female, Palpi brown. Head, thorax, and abdomen yellow. Fore wing yellowish suffused with orange-yellow especially at the base; a slight brown suffusion near the base; the whole disk suffused with brown. Hind wing white, yellowish towards the outer margin and with traces of a dark band beyond the cell. Underside whitish.
