= Eurhythma =

Scientific classification
- Domain: Eukaryota
- Kingdom: Animalia
- Phylum: Arthropoda
- Class: Insecta
- Order: Lepidoptera
- Family: Crambidae
- Subfamily: Crambinae
- Tribe: incertae sedis
- Genus: Eurhythma; Turner, 1904

Synonyms
- Eurythma Bleszynski & Collins, 1962

Genus of moths

Eurhythma is a genus of moths of the family Crambidae.

== Species ==
- Eurhythma argyphea (Turner, 1913)
- Eurhythma callipepla (Turner, 1915)
- Eurhythma cataxia (Turner, 1913)
- Eurhythma epargyra (Turner, 1913)
- Eurhythma latifasciella Turner, 1904
- Eurhythma polyzelota (Turner, 1913)
- Eurhythma xuthospila (Turner, 1913)
