= Japonicrambus =

Scientific classification
- Kingdom: Animalia
- Phylum: Arthropoda
- Clade: Pancrustacea
- Class: Insecta
- Order: Lepidoptera
- Family: Crambidae
- Subfamily: Crambinae
- Tribe: Crambini
- Genus: Japonicrambus; Okano, 1962

Genus of moths

Japonicrambus is a genus of moths of the family Crambidae.

== Species ==
- Japonicrambus bilineatus (Okano, 1957)
- Japonicrambus ishizukai Okano, 1962
- Japonicrambus mitsundoi Sasaki & Jinbo, 2002
