= Agriphiloides =

Scientific classification
- Kingdom: Animalia
- Phylum: Arthropoda
- Clade: Pancrustacea
- Class: Insecta
- Order: Lepidoptera
- Family: Crambidae
- Subfamily: Crambinae
- Tribe: Crambini
- Genus: Agriphiloides; Bleszynski, 1965
- Species: A. longipalpellus

Binomial name
- Agriphiloides longipalpellus Bleszynski, 1965

Genus of moths

Agriphiloides is a genus of moths of the family Crambidae. It contains only one species, Agriphiloides longipalpellus, which is found in Syria.
