= Japonicrambus bilineatus =

Scientific classification
- Kingdom: Animalia
- Phylum: Arthropoda
- Clade: Pancrustacea
- Class: Insecta
- Order: Lepidoptera
- Family: Crambidae
- Genus: Japonicrambus
- Species: J. bilineatus

Binomial name
- Japonicrambus bilineatus (Okano, 1957)

Synonyms
- Crambus bilineatus Okano, 1957

Species of moth

Japonicrambus bilineatus is a moth in the family Crambidae. It was described by Okano in 1957. It is found in Japan (Honshu).
