= Deltobotys citrodoxa =

Scientific classification
- Domain: Eukaryota
- Kingdom: Animalia
- Phylum: Arthropoda
- Class: Insecta
- Order: Lepidoptera
- Family: Crambidae
- Genus: Deltobotys
- Species: D. citrodoxa

Binomial name
- Deltobotys citrodoxa (Meyrick, 1936)

Synonyms
- Loxostege citrodoxa Meyrick, 1936

Species of moth

Deltobotys citrodoxa is a moth in the family Crambidae. It was described by Edward Meyrick in 1936. It is found in Venezuela.
