= Ubida =

Scientific classification
- Domain: Eukaryota
- Kingdom: Animalia
- Phylum: Arthropoda
- Class: Insecta
- Order: Lepidoptera
- Family: Crambidae
- Subfamily: Crambinae
- Tribe: incertae sedis
- Genus: Ubida; Walker, 1863

Synonyms
- Crunophila Meyrick, 1882

Genus of moths

Ubida is a genus of moths of the family Crambidae.

== Species ==
- Ubida amochla Turner, 1922
- Ubida hetaerica Turner, 1911
- Ubida holomochla Turner, 1904
- Ubida ramostriellus (Walker, 1863)
