= Niveocatharylla =

Scientific classification
- Domain: Eukaryota
- Kingdom: Animalia
- Phylum: Arthropoda
- Class: Insecta
- Order: Lepidoptera
- Family: Crambidae
- Subfamily: Crambinae
- Tribe: incertae sedis
- Genus: Niveocatharylla; Bassi, 1999

Genus of moths

Niveocatharylla is a genus of moths of the family Crambidae.

== Species ==
- Niveocatharylla bifasciella (Snellen, 1893)
- Niveocatharylla romieuxi Bassi, 1999
