= Tomissa =

Scientific classification
- Domain: Eukaryota
- Kingdom: Animalia
- Phylum: Arthropoda
- Class: Insecta
- Order: Lepidoptera
- Family: Crambidae
- Subfamily: Crambinae
- Tribe: incertae sedis
- Genus: Tomissa; Walker, 1864
- Species: T. concisella

Binomial name
- Tomissa concisella Walker, 1864

Genus of moths

Tomissa is a genus of moths of the family Crambidae. It contains only one species, Tomissa concisella, which is found in Sarawak.
