= Anaclastis =

Scientific classification
- Kingdom: Animalia
- Phylum: Arthropoda
- Class: Insecta
- Order: Lepidoptera
- Family: Crambidae
- Subfamily: Crambinae
- Tribe: incertae sedis
- Genus: Anaclastis; Turner, 1904
- Species: A. apicistrigellus

Binomial name
- Anaclastis apicistrigellus (Meyrick, 1879)

Synonyms
- Crambus apicistrigellus Meyrick, 1879

Genus of moths

Anaclastis is a genus of moths of the family Crambidae. It contains only one species, Anaclastis apicistrigellus, which is found in Australia, where it has been recorded from Queensland and New South Wales.
