= Neobanepa =

Scientific classification
- Domain: Eukaryota
- Kingdom: Animalia
- Phylum: Arthropoda
- Class: Insecta
- Order: Lepidoptera
- Family: Crambidae
- Subfamily: Crambinae
- Tribe: incertae sedis
- Genus: Neobanepa; Hampson, 1919
- Species: N. peruviensis

Binomial name
- Neobanepa peruviensis (Dognin, 1905)

Synonyms
- Pyralopsis Dognin, 1905 (non Boisduval, 1870: preoccupied); Pyralopsis peruviensis Dognin, 1905; Neobanepa aglossodes Hampson, 1919

Genus of moths

Neobanepa is a genus of moths of the family Crambidae. It contains only one species, Neobanepa peruviensis, which is found in Peru.
