= Japonicrambus ishizukai =

Scientific classification
- Kingdom: Animalia
- Phylum: Arthropoda
- Clade: Pancrustacea
- Class: Insecta
- Order: Lepidoptera
- Family: Crambidae
- Genus: Japonicrambus
- Species: J. ishizukai

Binomial name
- Japonicrambus ishizukai Okano, 1962

Species of moth

Japonicrambus ishizukai is a moth in the family Crambidae. It was described by Okano in 1962. It is found in Japan (Honshu).
