= Pseudopediasia amathusia =

Scientific classification
- Domain: Eukaryota
- Kingdom: Animalia
- Phylum: Arthropoda
- Class: Insecta
- Order: Lepidoptera
- Family: Crambidae
- Genus: Pseudopediasia
- Species: P. amathusia

Binomial name
- Pseudopediasia amathusia Błeszyński, 1963

Species of moth

Pseudopediasia amathusia is a moth in the family Crambidae. It was described by Stanisław Błeszyński in 1963. It is found in Argentina.
