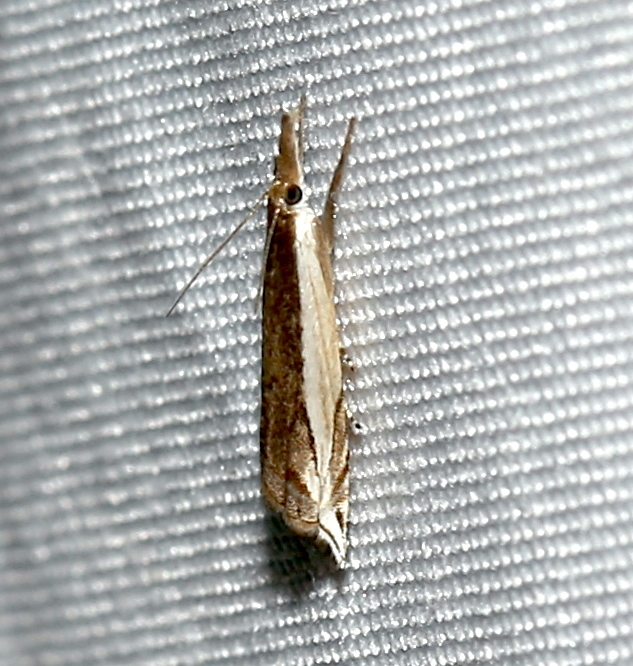
- Raphiptera argillaceellus

Scientific classification
- Kingdom: Animalia
- Phylum: Arthropoda
- Class: Insecta
- Order: Lepidoptera
- Family: Crambidae
- Subfamily: Crambinae
- Tribe: Crambini
- Genus: Raphiptera; Hampson, 1896
- Species: R. argillaceellus

Binomial name
- Raphiptera argillaceellus (Packard, 1867)

Synonyms
- Crambus argillaceellus Packard, 1867; Crambus argillaceus Hampson, 1896; Crambus argillaceellus minimellus Robinson, 1870; Raphiptera argillaceella

= Raphiptera =

Genus of moths

Raphiptera is a genus of moths of the family Crambidae. It contains only one species, Raphiptera argillaceellus, the diminutive grass-veneer, which is found in eastern North America, where it has been recorded from Labrador, Ontario, Wisconsin, Connecticut, New York, Quebec, Alberta and Michigan. The range extends to Florida and Texas in the south-east and Costa Rica in Central America. The habitat consists of bogs.

The wingspan is 10–15 mm. Adults are on wing from June to August.

The larvae probably feed on grasses.

== Subspecies ==
- Raphiptera argillaceellus argillaceellus
- Raphiptera argillaceellus minimellus (Robinson, 1870)
