= Chiqua =

Scientific classification
- Domain: Eukaryota
- Kingdom: Animalia
- Phylum: Arthropoda
- Class: Insecta
- Order: Lepidoptera
- Family: Crambidae
- Subfamily: Crambinae
- Tribe: Chiloini
- Genus: Chiqua; Błeszyński, 1970
- Species: C. eblisella

Binomial name
- Chiqua eblisella Błeszyński, 1970

Synonyms
- Chiqua eblisalis Munroe, 1995

Genus of moths

Chiqua is a monotypic moth genus of the family Crambidae described by Stanisław Błeszyński in 1970. It contains only one species, Chiqua eblisella, described in the same article, which is found in Bolivia.
