= Syntrita prosalis =

Scientific classification
- Domain: Eukaryota
- Kingdom: Animalia
- Phylum: Arthropoda
- Class: Insecta
- Order: Lepidoptera
- Family: Crambidae
- Genus: Syntrita
- Species: S. prosalis

Binomial name
- Syntrita prosalis (H. Druce, 1895)

Synonyms
- Leucochroma prosalis H. Druce, 1895

Species of moth

Syntrita prosalis is a moth in the family Crambidae. It was described by Herbert Druce in 1895. It is found in Panama.

The forewings and hindwings are yellowish white, the former with the base and inner margin spotted with yellowish brown, a large yellowish-brown patch extending across the wing near the apex and almost to the anal angle, on the outer edge of which is a pale waved line. The marginal line is spotted with black. The hindwings have several dark brown spots partly crossing the wing from the anal angle.
