= Paraplatytes =

Scientific classification
- Domain: Eukaryota
- Kingdom: Animalia
- Phylum: Arthropoda
- Class: Insecta
- Order: Lepidoptera
- Family: Crambidae
- Subfamily: Crambinae
- Tribe: Crambini
- Genus: Paraplatytes; Bleszynski, 1965
- Species: P. eberti

Binomial name
- Paraplatytes eberti Bleszynski, 1965

Genus of moths

Paraplatytes is a genus of moths of the family Crambidae. It contains only one species, Paraplatytes eberti, which is found in Afghanistan.
