= Stenorista =

Scientific classification
- Kingdom: Animalia
- Phylum: Arthropoda
- Class: Insecta
- Order: Lepidoptera
- Family: Crambidae
- Genus: Stenorista; Dognin, 1905

Genus of moths

Stenorista is a genus of moths of the family Crambidae described by Paul Dognin in 1905.

== Species ==
- Stenorista elongalis Dognin, 1905
- Stenorista fortunata (Schaus, 1912)
