= Silveria =

Silveria is a surname. Notable people with the surname include:

- David Silveria (born 1972), American drummer, former drummer for the band Korn
- Jay B. Silveria (fl. 1985–present), United States Air Force lieutenant general, 20th Superintendent of the United States Air Force Academy
- Robert Joseph Silveria Jr. (born 1959), American serial killer
- James A. Silveria (born 1971), owner and head chef of award winning Smokey Rib Ranch
