= Sphaerodeltis =

Scientific classification
- Domain: Eukaryota
- Kingdom: Animalia
- Phylum: Arthropoda
- Class: Insecta
- Order: Lepidoptera
- Family: Crambidae
- Subfamily: Crambinae
- Tribe: incertae sedis
- Genus: Sphaerodeltis; Meyrick, 1933
- Species: S. psammoleuca

Binomial name
- Sphaerodeltis psammoleuca Meyrick, 1933

Genus of moths

Sphaerodeltis is a genus of moths of the family Crambidae. It contains only one species, Sphaerodeltis psammoleuca, which is found in the Democratic Republic of Congo.
