= Syngropia =

Scientific classification
- Domain: Eukaryota
- Kingdom: Animalia
- Phylum: Arthropoda
- Class: Insecta
- Order: Lepidoptera
- Family: Crambidae
- Subfamily: Spilomelinae
- Genus: Syngropia; Hampson, 1912
- Species: S. stictica

Binomial name
- Syngropia stictica Hampson, 1912

Genus of moths

Syngropia is a monotypic moth genus of the family Crambidae described by George Hampson in 1912. Its one species, Syngropia stictica, described in the same article, is found in Guatemala.

The wingspan is 22–26 mm. The forewings are yellowish white, with obliquely placed subdorsal blackish spots below the costa and above the inner margin. There is an anteraedial line from below the costa to the median nervure and a bar above the inner margin. The postmedial line is blackish, forming slight spots at veins, excurved between veins 6 and 3, then incurved. There are terminal blackish spots above veins 6 and 3. The hindwings are semihyaline yellowish white with an oblique blackish postmedial bar between veins 6 and 3 and an oblique line from vein 2 to the tornus. There are also terminal blackish spots at the apex and vein 3.
