= Schoenobiodes =

Scientific classification
- Domain: Eukaryota
- Kingdom: Animalia
- Phylum: Arthropoda
- Class: Insecta
- Order: Lepidoptera
- Family: Crambidae
- Subfamily: Crambinae
- Tribe: incertae sedis
- Genus: Schoenobiodes; Hampson, 1917

Synonyms
- Stenopydna Roepke, 1943

Genus of moths

Schoenobiodes is a genus of moths of the family Crambidae.

== Species ==
- Schoenobiodes lanceolata (Roepke, 1943)
- Schoenobiodes strata (Schultze, 1907)
