= Discothyris =

Scientific classification
- Kingdom: Animalia
- Phylum: Arthropoda
- Class: Insecta
- Order: Lepidoptera
- Family: Crambidae
- Subfamily: Pyraustinae
- Genus: Discothyris; Warren, 1895
- Species: D. ferruginata

Binomial name
- Discothyris ferruginata (Moore, 1888)

Synonyms
- Agrotera ferruginata Moore, 1888

Genus of moths

Discothyris is a genus of moths of the family Crambidae. It contains only one species, Discothyris ferruginata, which is found in Taiwan and India.
