= Bassiknysna =

Scientific classification
- Kingdom: Animalia
- Phylum: Arthropoda
- Clade: Pancrustacea
- Class: Insecta
- Order: Lepidoptera
- Family: Crambidae
- Subfamily: Crambinae
- Tribe: Crambini
- Genus: Bassiknysna; Kemal & Kocak, 2005
- Species: B. jansei

Binomial name
- Bassiknysna jansei (Bassi, 1999)

Synonyms
- Knysna Bassi, 1999 (Junior homonym of Knysna Péringuey, 1902); Knysna jansei Bassi, 1999

Genus of moths

Bassiknysna is a genus of moths of the family Crambidae. It contains only one species, Bassiknysna jansei, which is found in South Africa.
