= Diadexia =

Scientific classification
- Domain: Eukaryota
- Kingdom: Animalia
- Phylum: Arthropoda
- Class: Insecta
- Order: Lepidoptera
- Family: Crambidae
- Subfamily: Crambinae
- Tribe: incertae sedis
- Genus: Diadexia; Turner, 1905

Genus of moths

Diadexia is a genus of moths of the family Crambidae.

== Species ==
- Diadexia anchylocrossa Turner, 1924
- Diadexia argyropasta Turner, 1911
- Diadexia parodes Turner, 1905
