= Cervicrambus =

Scientific classification
- Domain: Eukaryota
- Kingdom: Animalia
- Phylum: Arthropoda
- Class: Insecta
- Order: Lepidoptera
- Family: Crambidae
- Genus: Cervicrambus; Bleszynski, 1966
- Species: C. eximiellus

Binomial name
- Cervicrambus eximiellus (Zincken, 1821)

Synonyms
- Chilo eximiellus Zincken, 1821; Crambus argentilineellus Hampson, 1896

Genus of moths

Cervicrambus is a genus of moths of the family Crambidae. It contains only one species, Cervicrambus eximiellus, which is found in Brazil (Bahia, Parana, São Paulo).
