= Dimorphocrambus =

Scientific classification
- Kingdom: Animalia
- Phylum: Arthropoda
- Clade: Pancrustacea
- Class: Insecta
- Order: Lepidoptera
- Family: Crambidae
- Subfamily: Crambinae
- Tribe: Crambini
- Genus: Dimorphocrambus; Gibeaux, 1987
- Species: D. espeletiae

Binomial name
- Dimorphocrambus espeletiae Gibeaux, 1987

Genus of moths

Dimorphocrambus is a genus of moths of the family Crambidae. It contains only one species, Dimorphocrambus espeletiae, which is found in Venezuela.
