= Styxon =

Scientific classification
- Domain: Eukaryota
- Kingdom: Animalia
- Phylum: Arthropoda
- Class: Insecta
- Order: Lepidoptera
- Family: Crambidae
- Subfamily: Crambinae
- Tribe: incertae sedis
- Genus: Styxon; Bleszynski, 1962
- Species: S. ciniferalis

Binomial name
- Styxon ciniferalis (Caradja, 1925)

Synonyms
- Stenochilo ciniferalis Caradja, 1925

Genus of moths

Styxon is a genus of moths of the family Crambidae. It contains only one species, Styxon ciniferalis, which is found in China (Guangdong).
