= Supercrambus =

Scientific classification
- Domain: Eukaryota
- Kingdom: Animalia
- Phylum: Arthropoda
- Class: Insecta
- Order: Lepidoptera
- Family: Crambidae
- Subfamily: Crambinae
- Tribe: Crambini
- Genus: Supercrambus; Bleszynski, 1967
- Species: S. albiradialis

Binomial name
- Supercrambus albiradialis (Hampson, 1919)

Synonyms
- Crambus albiradialis Hampson, 1919; Crambus dukinfieldiellus Schaus, 1922

Genus of moths

Supercrambus is a genus of moths of the family Crambidae. It contains only one species, Supercrambus albiradialis, which is found in Brazil (Rio de Janeiro, Parana).
