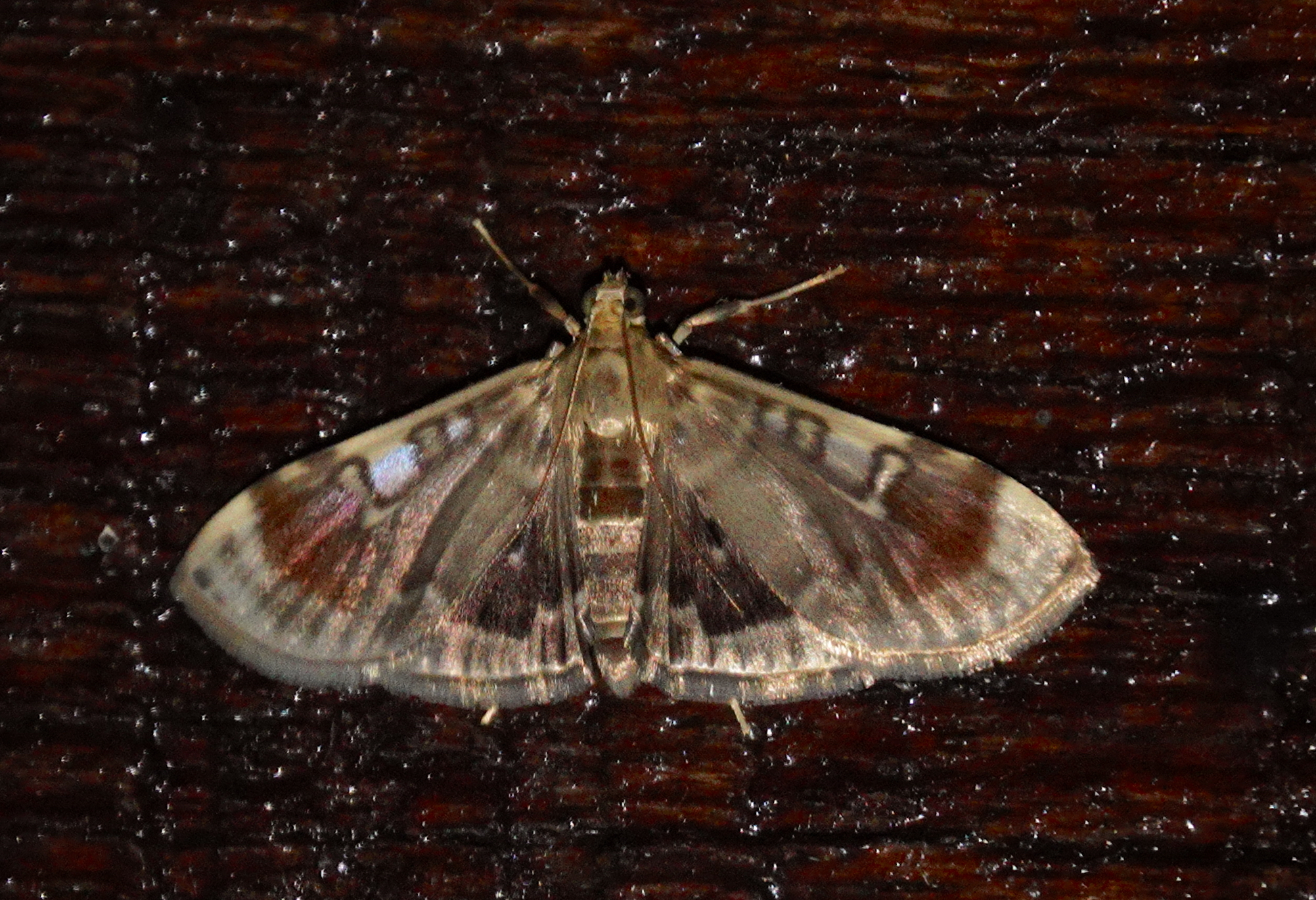
- Syntrita umbralis

Scientific classification
- Domain: Eukaryota
- Kingdom: Animalia
- Phylum: Arthropoda
- Class: Insecta
- Order: Lepidoptera
- Family: Crambidae
- Subfamily: Spilomelinae
- Genus: Syntrita; Dognin, 1905

= Syntrita =

Genus of moths

Syntrita is a genus of moths of the family Crambidae described by Paul Dognin in 1905.

== Species ==
- Syntrita fulviferalis (Dognin, 1912)
- Syntrita leucochasma (Hampson, 1912)
- Syntrita monostigmatalis (Dognin, 1912)
- Syntrita nimalis (Schaus, 1924)
- Syntrita prosalis (Druce, 1895)
- Syntrita umbralis Dognin, 1905
