= Sarabotys =

Scientific classification
- Kingdom: Animalia
- Phylum: Arthropoda
- Class: Insecta
- Order: Lepidoptera
- Family: Crambidae
- Subfamily: Pyraustinae
- Genus: Sarabotys; Munroe, 1964

Genus of moths

Sarabotys is a genus of moths of the family Crambidae.

== Species ==
- Sarabotys cupreicostalis
- Sarabotys ferriterminalis Munroe, 1964
