= Demobotys =

Scientific classification
- Kingdom: Animalia
- Phylum: Arthropoda
- Clade: Pancrustacea
- Class: Insecta
- Order: Lepidoptera
- Family: Crambidae
- Subfamily: Pyraustinae
- Genus: Demobotys; Munroe & Mutuura, 1969

Genus of moths

Demobotys is a genus of moths of the family Crambidae.

== Species ==
- Demobotys monoceralis (Munroe & Mutuura, 1969)
- Demobotys pervulgalis (Hampson, 1913)
