= Nechilo =

Scientific classification
- Domain: Eukaryota
- Kingdom: Animalia
- Phylum: Arthropoda
- Class: Insecta
- Order: Lepidoptera
- Family: Crambidae
- Genus: Nechilo; Bleszynski, 1970
- Species: N. macrogona

Binomial name
- Nechilo macrogona (Lower, 1902)

Synonyms
- Talis macrogona Lower, 1902; Chilo oxyprora Turner, 1904

Genus of moths

Nechilo is a genus of moths of the family Crambidae. It contains only one species, Nechilo macrogona, which is found in Australia, where it has been recorded from Victoria.
