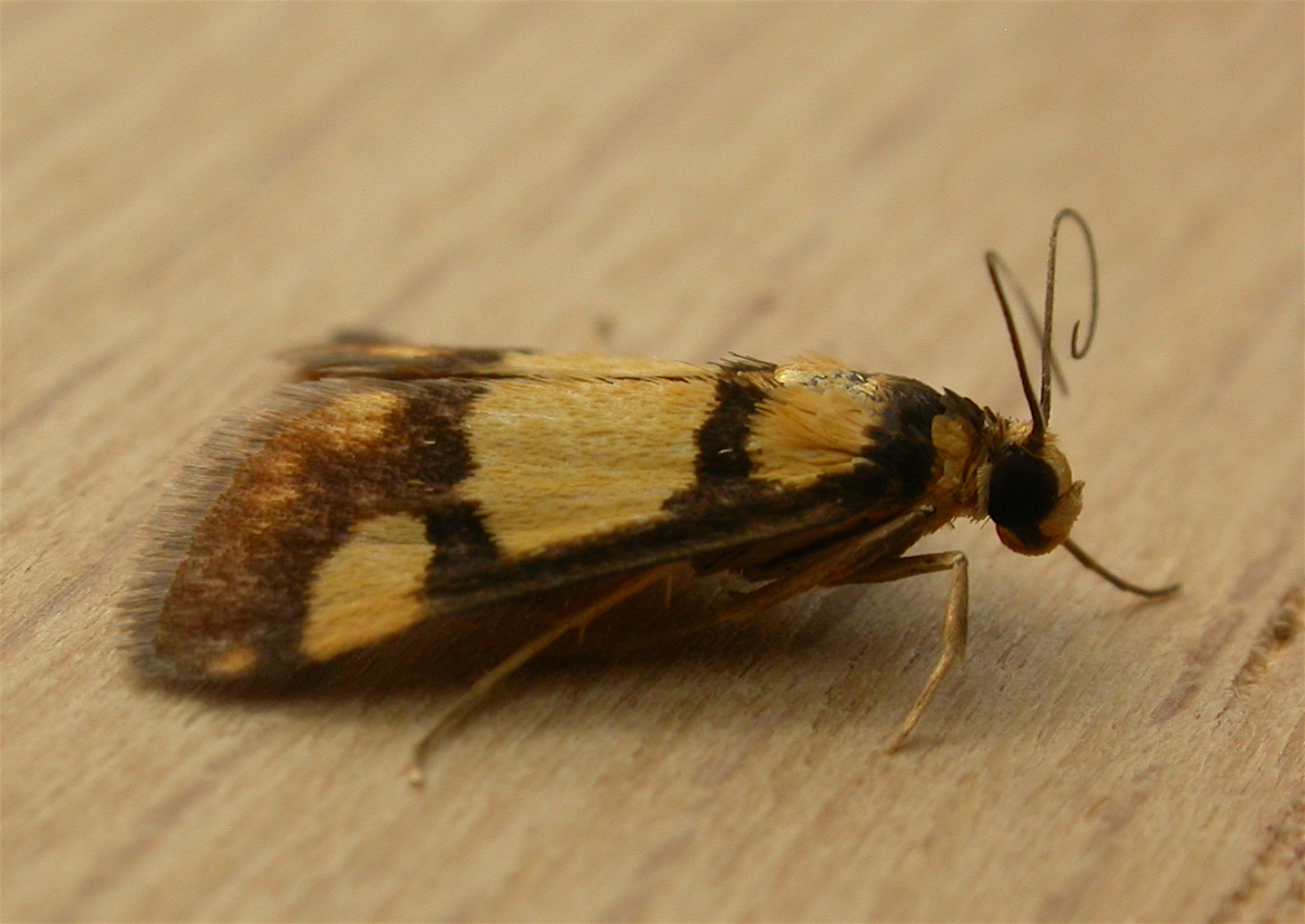
- Deuterarcha xanthomela

Scientific classification
- Domain: Eukaryota
- Kingdom: Animalia
- Phylum: Arthropoda
- Class: Insecta
- Order: Lepidoptera
- Family: Crambidae
- Subfamily: Spilomelinae
- Genus: Deuterarcha; Meyrick, 1884

= Deuterarcha =

Genus of moths

Deuterarcha is a genus of moths of the family Crambidae. The genus was described by Edward Meyrick in 1884.

== Species ==
- Deuterarcha xanthomela Meyrick, 1884
- Deuterarcha flavalis Hampson, 1893
