= Diploptalis =

Scientific classification
- Kingdom: Animalia
- Phylum: Arthropoda
- Class: Insecta
- Order: Lepidoptera
- Family: Crambidae
- Subfamily: Crambinae
- Tribe: incertae sedis
- Genus: Diploptalis; Hampson, 1919
- Species: D. metallescens

Binomial name
- Diploptalis metallescens Hampson, 1919

Synonyms
- Genus synonymy: Diplotalis Błeszyński, 1963; Diplotalis Hampson, 1919

Genus of moths

Diploptalis is a genus of moths of the family Crambidae. It contains only one species, Diploptalis metallescens, which is found in Nigeria.
