= Sericocrambus =

Scientific classification
- Domain: Eukaryota
- Kingdom: Animalia
- Phylum: Arthropoda
- Class: Insecta
- Order: Lepidoptera
- Family: Crambidae
- Subfamily: Crambinae
- Tribe: Crambini
- Genus: Sericocrambus; Wallengren, 1861
- Species: S. stylatus

Binomial name
- Sericocrambus stylatus Wallengren, 1861

Genus of moths

Sericocrambus is a genus of moths of the family Crambidae. It contains only one species, Sericocrambus stylatus, which is found in Uruguay.
