= Sacculosia =

Scientific classification
- Domain: Eukaryota
- Kingdom: Animalia
- Phylum: Arthropoda
- Class: Insecta
- Order: Lepidoptera
- Family: Crambidae
- Subfamily: Spilomelinae
- Genus: Sacculosia; Amsel, 1956
- Species: S. isaralis

Binomial name
- Sacculosia isaralis (C. Felder, R. Felder & Rogenhofer, 1875)

Synonyms
- Botys isaralis C. Felder, R. Felder & Rogenhofer, 1875; Desmia jovealis Snellen, 1875

Genus of moths

Sacculosia is a genus of moths of the family Crambidae. It contains only one species, Sacculosia isaralis, which is found in Colombia.
