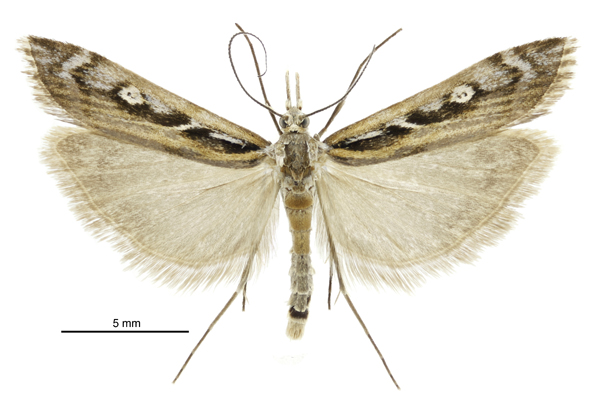
- Male

Conservation status
- Nationally Vulnerable (NZ TCS)

Scientific classification
- Kingdom: Animalia
- Phylum: Arthropoda
- Clade: Pancrustacea
- Class: Insecta
- Order: Lepidoptera
- Family: Crambidae
- Subfamily: Crambinae
- Tribe: incertae sedis
- Genus: Kupea; Philpott, 1930
- Species: K. electilis

Binomial name
- Kupea electilis Philpott, 1930

= Kupea electilis =

Genus of moths

Kupea is a monotypic moth genus of the family Crambidae described by Alfred Philpott in 1930. It contains only one species, Kupea electilis, also known as Kupe's grassmoth, which is endemic to New Zealand. This species has only been recorded at Kaitorete Spit. The larvae feed on Zoysia minima and exist in a cocoon constructed of silk and sand. Adults are on the wing from March to April. It has been hypothesised that the adults are active at twilight. It is classified as Nationally Vulnerable by the Department of Conservation. The female of the species was first discovered in 2012.

== Taxonomy ==
Kupea electilis was first described by Alfred Philpott in 1930 using male specimens collected at Birdling's Flat, Kaitorete Spit by Stuart Lindsay in March. The species was again described and figured by George Vernon Hudson in 1939. David E. Gaskin discussed the species in 1975 stating that once a female specimen was found the systemic position of the genus should be reassessed. The type specimen is held at the Canterbury Museum.

== Description ==
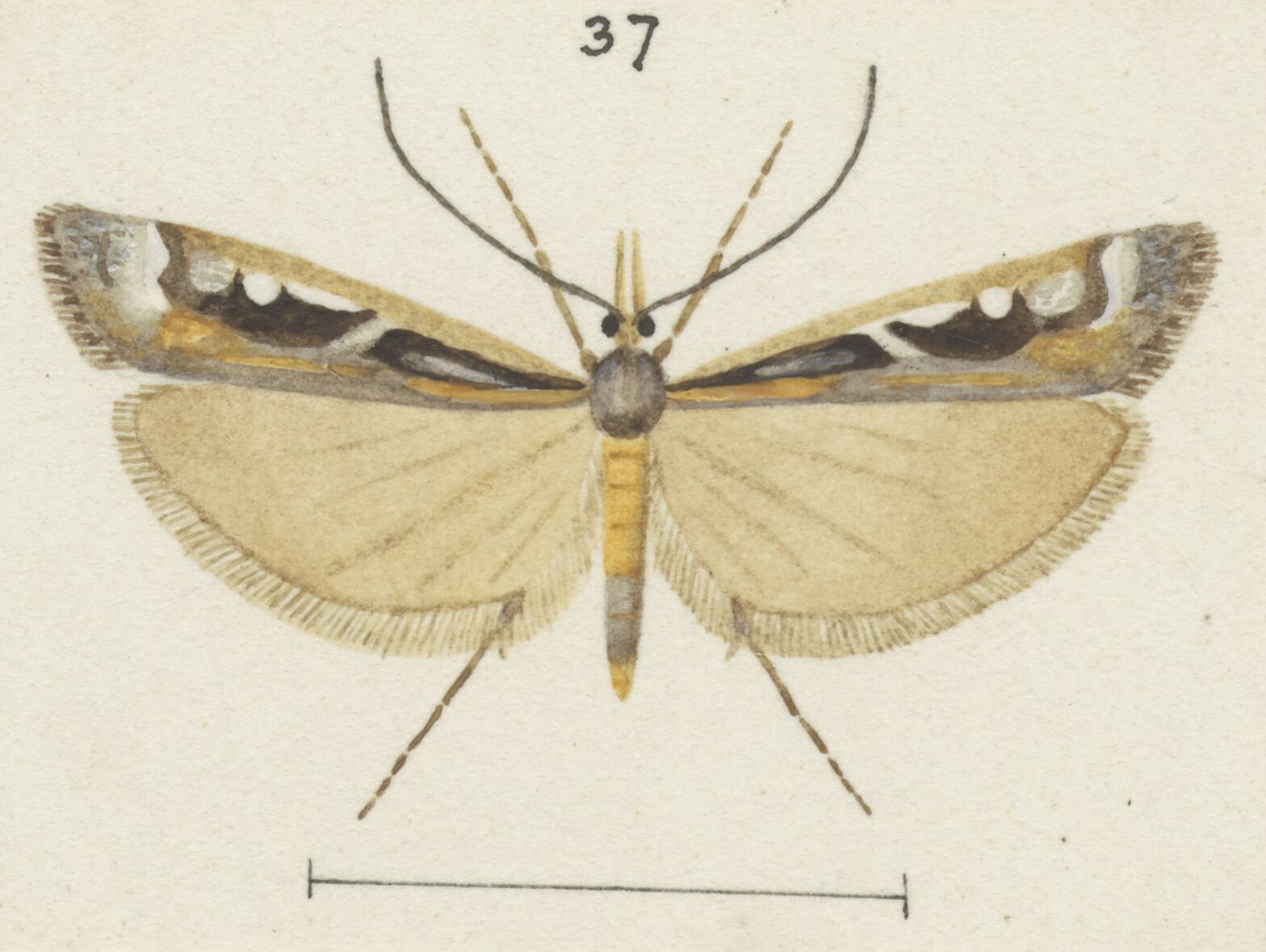
Illustration of male.

Philpott described this species as follows:

♂ 20mm. Head ochreous mixed with white. Palpi 4, ochreous mixed with white. Antennae in ♂ serrate, ciliations 3/4. Thorax ochreous, tegulae margined with white, collar olive brown. Abdomen ochreous, brassy tinged. Legs ochreous, tarsi annulated with white. Forewings long, narrow, costa almost straight, apex blunt-pointed, termen rounded, strongly oblique; brassy ochreous sprinkled with white; a thick blackish brown median stripe from base to 2/3, interrupted by white markings as follows :—a linear spot beyond base on upper margin suffusedly white beneath, a rather broad outwardly oblique bar beyond this, a subovate spot on upper margin with a streak below it following along fold, a large circular spot at apex above; beyond apex of median stripe a large suffused roundish whitish patch; second line broad, curved, white, becoming obsolete on tornus, anteriorly brassy margined; dorsum suffusedly margined with white; fringes fuscous mixed with white on apical half and with a darker basal line. Hindwings greyish ochreous; fringes whitish ochreous with darker basal line half and with a darker basal line. Hindwings greyish ochreous; fringes whitish ochreous with darker basal line.

The male has a limited ability to fly. The female of the species is brachypterous.

== Distribution ==
Kupea electilis is endemic to New Zealand. It has only ever been recorded on sites around Kaitorete Spit, Canterbury. The female of the species was first discovered in 2012.

== Life history ==
The larvae exist in a cocoon constructed of silk and sand. They feed on dried pieces of their host plant within the cocoon. Adults are on the wing from mid March to mid April. The time they are active is unknown as K. electilis are not attracted to light but it has been hypothesised they are active at twilight.

== Habitat and host plant ==
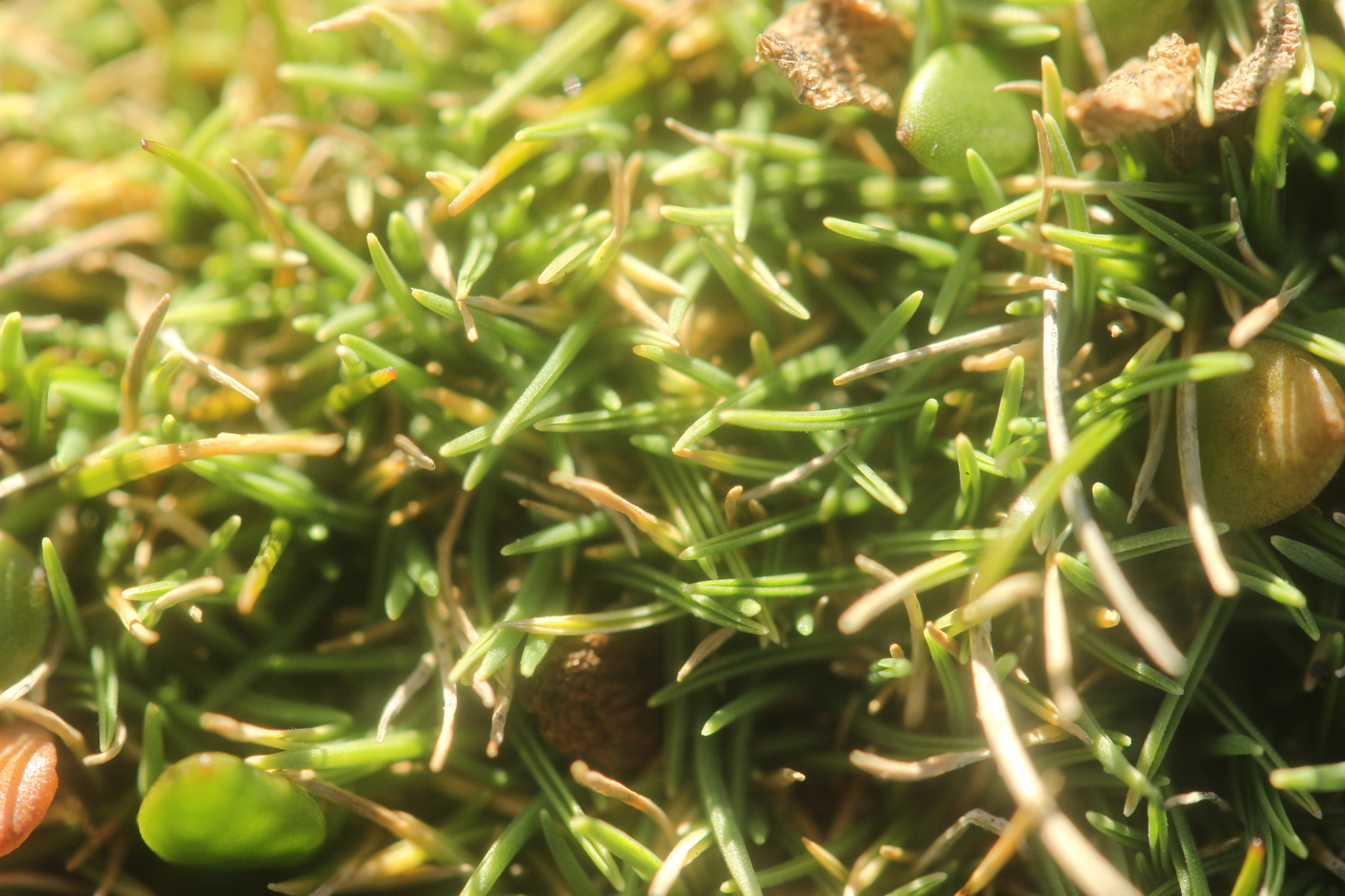
Larval host Zoysia minima.

This species occurs at sand plains, behind foredunes and low hind dunes. The host of this species is the endemic plant Zoysia minima.

== Conservation status ==
Kupea electilis is regarded as being "Nationally Vulnerable" under the New Zealand Threat Classification System. The main threats to this species include grazing cattle and introduced pests such as rabbits that eat its host plant, weed invasion from plants such as sea spurge, and the development or use of land by humans.

== See also ==
- Crambidae
- New Zealand Threat Classification System
- Kaitorete Spit
