= Sericophylla =

Scientific classification
- Domain: Eukaryota
- Kingdom: Animalia
- Phylum: Arthropoda
- Class: Insecta
- Order: Lepidoptera
- Family: Crambidae
- Subfamily: Spilomelinae
- Genus: Sericophylla; Turner, 1937
- Species: S. nivalis

Binomial name
- Sericophylla nivalis Turner, 1937

Synonyms
- Sericophora Turner, 1937

Genus of moths

Sericophylla is a monotypic moth genus of the family Crambidae described by Alfred Jefferis Turner in 1937. Its only species, Sericophylla nivalis, described in the same paper, is found in Australia, where it has been recorded from Queensland.
