= Deltobotys =

Scientific classification
- Domain: Eukaryota
- Kingdom: Animalia
- Phylum: Arthropoda
- Class: Insecta
- Order: Lepidoptera
- Family: Crambidae
- Subfamily: Pyraustinae
- Genus: Deltobotys; Munroe, 1964

Genus of moths

Deltobotys is a genus of moths of the family Crambidae.

== Species ==
- Deltobotys brachypteralis (Hampson, 1913)
- Deltobotys citrodoxa (Meyrick, 1936)
- Deltobotys galba Munroe, 1964
