= Diploschistis =

Scientific classification
- Kingdom: Animalia
- Phylum: Arthropoda
- Class: Insecta
- Order: Lepidoptera
- Family: Crambidae
- Subfamily: Crambinae
- Tribe: incertae sedis
- Genus: Diploschistis; Meyrick, 1937
- Species: D. stygiocrena

Binomial name
- Diploschistis stygiocrena Meyrick, 1937

Genus of moths

Diploschistis is a genus of moths of the family Crambidae. It contains only one species, Diploschistis stygiocrena, which is found in the Democratic Republic of Congo.
