= Tulla exonoma =

Scientific classification
- Kingdom: Animalia
- Phylum: Arthropoda
- Class: Insecta
- Order: Lepidoptera
- Family: Crambidae
- Subfamily: Crambinae
- Tribe: incertae sedis
- Genus: Tulla; Zimmerman, 1958
- Species: T. exonoma

Binomial name
- Tulla exonoma (Meyrick, 1899)

Synonyms
- Prionopteryx exonoma Meyrick, 1899

Genus of moths

Tulla is a monotypic moth genus of the family Crambidae described by Elwood Zimmerman in 1958. Its only species, Tulla exonoma, described by Edward Meyrick in 1899, is endemic to the Hawaiian island of Oahu.
