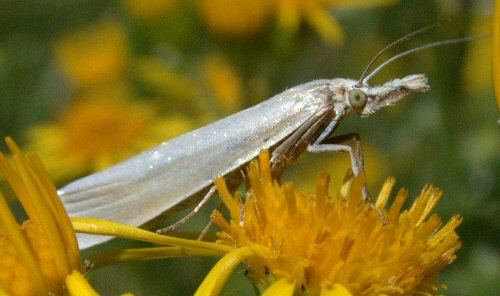
- Crambus perlella

Scientific classification
- Kingdom: Animalia
- Phylum: Arthropoda
- Class: Insecta
- Order: Lepidoptera
- Family: Crambidae
- Subfamily: Crambinae; Latreille, 1810

Tribes
- Argyriini; Chiloini; Crambini; and see text

Synonyms
- Ancylolomiinae

= Crambinae =

Subfamily of moths

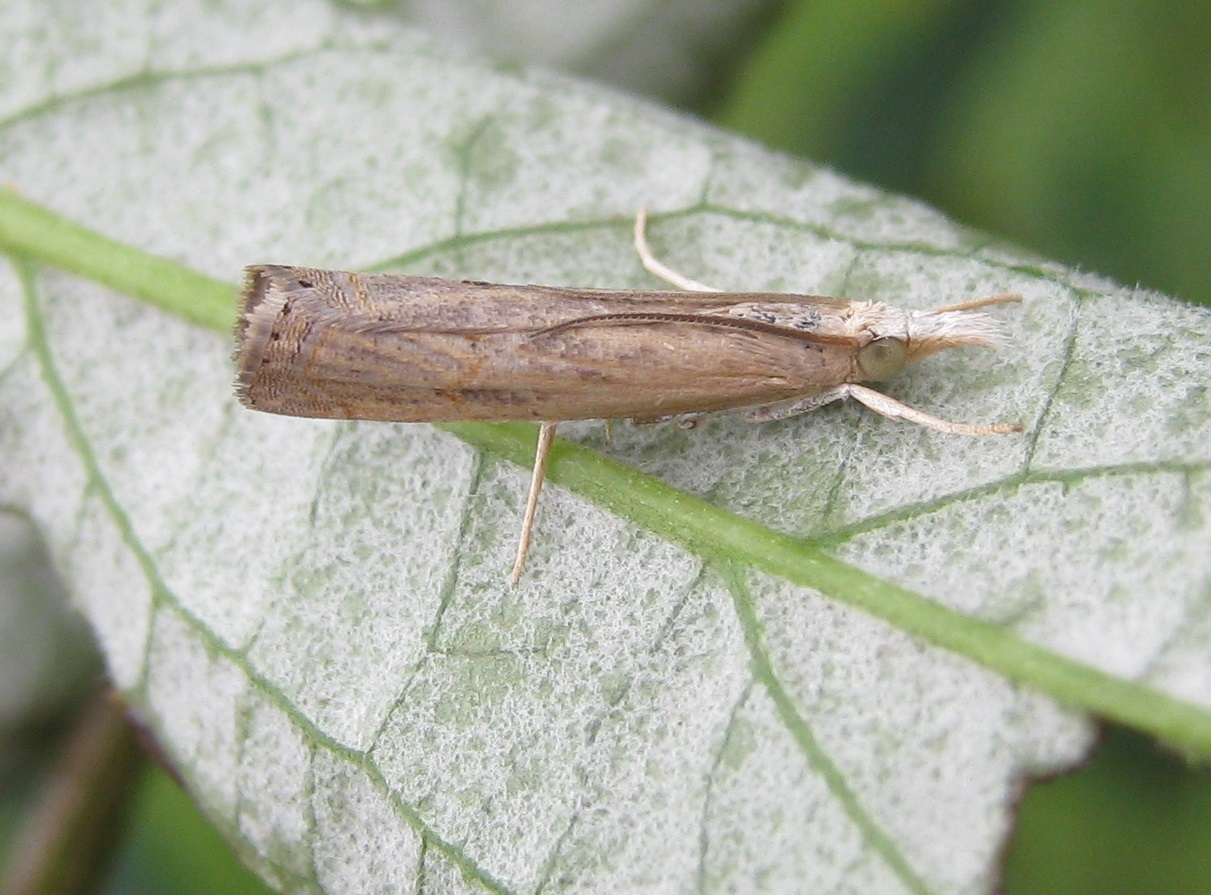
Parapediasia teterrellus

Crambinae is a large subfamily of the lepidopteran family Crambidae, the crambid snout moths. It currently includes over 1,800 species worldwide. The larvae are root feeders or stem borers, mostly on grasses. A few species are pests of sod grasses, maize, sugar cane, rice, and other Poaceae. The monophyly of this group is supported by the structure of the tympanal organs and the phallus attached medially to the juxta, as well as genetic analyses.

Taxonomists' opinions differ as to the correct placement of the Crambidae, some authorities treating them as a subfamily of the family Pyralidae. If this is done, the present group would be demoted to tribe status, as Crambini.

== Crambinae taxonomy ==
- tribe incertae sedis
  - Anaclastis Turner, 1904
  - Aphrophantis Meyrick, 1933
  - Argentochiloides Błeszyński, 1961 (= Argentochilo Błeszyński & Collins, 1962)
  - Australargyria Błeszyński, 1970
  - Autarotis Meyrick, 1886 (= Pogonoptera Turner, 1911)
  - Batiana Walker, 1866
  - Burmannia Bleszynski, 1965
  - Catancyla Hampson, 1919
  - Catharylla Zeller, 1863
  - Charltona Swinhoe, 1886
  - Charltoniada Strand, 1918
  - Conocrambus Hampson, 1919 (= Anaresca Turner, 1947)
  - Corynophora Berg, 1898 (= Halterophora Meyrick, 1897)
  - Cypholomia Meyrick, 1933
  - Diadexia Turner, 1905
  - Diploptalis Hampson, 1919 (= Diplotalis Błeszyński, 1963)
  - Diploschistis Meyrick, 1937
  - Elethyia Ragonot in de Joannis & Ragonot, 1889
  - Epina Walker, 1866 (= Diatraenopsis Dyar & Heinrich, 1927)
  - Eurhythma Turner, 1904 (= Eurythma Błeszyński & Collins, 1962)
  - Hemiplatytes Barnes & Benjamin, 1924 (= Alamogordia Dyar & Heinrich, 1927)
  - Hemiptocha Dognin, 1905
  - Idioblasta Warren, 1891
  - Japonichilo Okano, 1962
  - Kupea Philpott, 1930
  - Libuna Moore, 1886 (= Bulina Walker, 1866)
  - Lyndia Savigny, 1816
  - Maoricrambus Gaskin, 1975
  - Mestolobes Butler, 1882 (= Promylaea Meyrick, 1899)
  - Metaeuchromius Błeszyński, 1960 (= Pseudeuchromius Błeszyński, 1965)
  - Micrelephas Dognin, 1905
  - Microchilo Okano, 1962
  - Micronix Amsel, 1956
  - Microtalis Turner, 1911
  - Neargyria Hampson, 1896
  - Neargyrioides Błeszyński, 1970
  - Nechilo Błeszyński, 1970
  - Neobanepa Hampson, 1919 (= Pyralopsis Dognin, 1905)
  - Niveocatharylla Bassi, 1999
  - Orthomecyna Butler, 1883
  - Parancyla Hampson, 1919
  - Paratraea Hampson, 1919
  - Parerupa Hampson, 1919 (= Coenotalis Hampson, 1919)
  - Protyparcha Meyrick, 1909
  - Pseudargyria Okano, 1962
  - Pseudometachilo Błeszyński, 1962
  - Ptochostola Meyrick, 1882
  - Roxita Błeszyński, 1963 (= Modestia Błeszyński, 1965)
  - Schoenobiodes Hampson, 1917 (= Stenopydna Roepke, 1943)
  - Sphaerodeltis Meyrick, 1933
  - Styxon Błeszyński, 1962
  - Thalamarchis Meyrick, 1897
  - Tomissa Walker, 1864
  - Tulla Zimmerman, 1958
  - Ubida Walker, 1863 (= Crunophila Meyrick, 1882)
  - Zacatecas Błeszyński, 1962
- tribe Ancylolomiini Ragonot, 1889
  - Ancylolomia Hübner, 1825 (= Acylolomia Hampson, 1919, Jartheza Walker, 1863, Pseudoctenella Strand, 1907, Ctenus Mabille, 1906, Tollia Amsel, 1949)
  - Aurotalis Błeszyński, 1970
  - Eufernaldia Hulst, 1900
  - Mesolia Ragonot in de Joannis & Ragonot, 1889 (= Deuterolia Dyar, 1914, Eugrotea Fernald, 1896, Euparolia Dyar, 1914, Masolia Hampson, 1919)
  - Prionapteron Błeszyński, 1965
  - Prionapteryx Stephens, 1834 (= Alloea Turner, 1947, Calarina Walker, 1866, Hypotomorpha Rebel, 1892, Nuarace Walker, 1863, Naurace Błeszyński & Collins, 1962, Pindicitora Walker, 1863, Pindicitra Shibuya, 1928, Platytesia Strand, 1918, Prionopteryx Zeller, 1863)
  - Prionotalis Hampson, 1919
  - Pseudoschoenobius Fernald, 1891
  - Surattha Walker, 1863
  - Talis Guenée, 1845 (= Drasa Kapur, 1950, Prosmixis Zeller, 1846, Tulis Pagenstecher, 1909)
  - Zovax Błeszyński, 1962
- tribe Argyriini Munroe, 1995
  - Argyria Hübner, 1818
  - Urola Walker, 1863
  - Vaxi Błeszyński, 1962
- tribe Calamotrophini Gaskin, 1988
  - Calamotropha Zeller, 1863 (= Aurelianus Błeszyński, 1962, Myeza Walker, 1863)
  - Chrysocatharylla Bassi, 1999
  - Classeya Błeszyński, 1960
  - Pseudocatharylla Błeszyński, 1961
  - Pseudoclasseya Błeszyński, 1964
- tribe Chiloini Heinemann, 1865
  - Chilandrus Błeszyński, 1970
  - Chilo Zincken, 1817 (= Borer Guenée, 1862, Chilona Sodoffsky, 1837, Chilotraea Kapur, 1950, Diphryx Grote, 1881, Hypiesta Hampson, 1919, Nephalia Turner, 1911, Silveria Dyar, 1925)
  - Chiqua Błeszyński, 1970
  - Diatraea Guilding, 1828 (= Crambidiatraea Box & Capps, 1955, Diaraetria Grote, 1882, Diatraerupa Schaus, 1913, Diatrea Guilding, 1828, Eodiatraea Box, 1953, Iesta Dyar, 1909, Trinidadia Dyar & Heinrich, 1927, Zeadiatraea Box, 1955)
  - Eschata Walker, 1856 (= Chaerecla Walker, 1865)
  - Gadira Walker, 1866 (= Cryptomima Meyrick, 1882, Scenoploca Meyrick, 1882)
  - Hednota Meyrick, 1886
  - Leonardo Błeszyński, 1965
  - Malgasochilo Błeszyński, 1970
  - Myelobia Herrich-Schäffer, 1854 (= Chilopsis Hampson, 1919, Doratoperas Hampson, 1896, Protaphomia Meyrick, 1936, Xanthopherne Dyar & Heinrich, 1927)
  - Tauroscopa Meyrick, 1888 (= Oressaula Turner, 1913)
- tribe Crambini Latreille, 1810
  - Agriphila Hübner, 1825 (= Agrophila J. L. R. Agassiz, 1847, Alisa Ganev & Hacker, 1984)
  - Agriphiloides Błeszyński, 1965
  - Almita B. Landry, 1995
  - Alphacrambus Bassi, 1995
  - Amselia Błeszyński, 1959
  - Angustalius Marion, 1954 (= Bleszynskia Lattin, 1961, Crambopsis Lattin, 1952)
  - Arequipa Walker, 1863
  - Aureocramboides Błeszyński, 1961
  - Bassiknysna Kemal & Kocak, 2005 (= Knysna Bassi, 1999)
  - Caffrocrambus Błeszyński, 1961 (= Anomocrambus Błeszyński, 1961, Caffocrambus Bassi, 1994)
  - Catoptria Hübner, 1825 (= Exoria Hübner, 1825, Tetrachila Hübner, 1806)
  - Cervicrambus Błeszyński, 1966
  - Chrysocrambus Błeszyński, 1957 (= Chrysocramboides Błeszyński, 1957)
  - Chrysoteuchia Hübner, 1825 (= Amphibolia Snellen, 1884, Veronese Błeszyński, 1962)
  - Conocramboides Błeszyński, 1970
  - Crambixon Błeszyński, 1965
  - Crambus Fabricius, 1798 (= Argyroteuchia Hübner, 1825, Chilus Billberg, 1820, Palparia Haworth, 1811, Tetrachila Hübner, 1822)
  - Culladia Moore, 1886 (= Araxes Walker, 1863, Crambidion Mabille, 1900, Nirmaladia Rose, 1983)
  - Culladiella Błeszyński, 1970
  - Dimorphocrambus Gibeaux, 1987
  - Epichilo Ragonot in de Joannis & Ragonot, 1889
  - Fernandocrambus Aurivillius, 1922 (= Juania Aurivillius, 1922, Juanita Munroe, 1995)
  - Fissicrambus Błeszyński, 1963
  - Flavocrambus Błeszyński, 1959
  - Haplopediasia Błeszyński, 1963
  - Haploplatytes Błeszyński, 1966
  - Japonicrambus Okano, 1962
  - La Błeszyński, 1966
  - Loxocrambus Forbes, 1920
  - Mesocrambus Błeszyński, 1957
  - Mesopediasia Błeszyński, 1963
  - Metacrambus Błeszyński, 1957
  - Microcramboides Błeszyński, 1967
  - Microcrambon Błeszyński, 1970
  - Microcrambus Błeszyński, 1963
  - Miraxis Błeszyński, 1962
  - Miyakea Marumo, 1933
  - Neocrambus Błeszyński, 1957
  - Neoculladia Błeszyński, 1967
  - Neodactria B. Landry, 1995
  - Neopediasia Okano, 1962
  - Novocrambus Amsel, 1956
  - Orocrambus Purdie, 1884 (= Orocrambus Meyrick, 1885)
  - Parapediasia Błeszyński, 1966 (Parapediasia Błeszyński, 1963)
  - Paraplatytes Błeszyński, 1965
  - Pediasia Hübner, 1825 (= Carvanca Walker, 1856, Oseriates Fazekas, 1991, Pseudopediasia Ganev, 1987)
  - Platytes Guenée, 1845 (= Nagahama Marumo, 1933)
  - Precaffrocrambus Bassi, 2002
  - Productalius Marion, 1954
  - Pseudopediasia Błeszyński, 1963
  - Raphiptera Hampson, 1896
  - Sebrus Błeszyński, 1970
  - Sericocrambus Wallengren, 1861
  - Supercrambus Błeszyński, 1967
  - Tawhitia Philpott, 1931 (= Velasquez Błeszyński, 1962)
  - Tehama Hulst, 1888
  - Thaumatopsis Morrison, 1874 (= Propexus Grote, 1880)
  - Thisanotia Hübner, 1825 (= Thinasotia Heinemann, 1865, Thysanotia J. L. R. Agassiz, 1847)
  - Tortriculladia Błeszyński, 1967
  - Xanthocrambus Błeszyński, 1957 (= Xanthocrambus Błeszyński, 1955)
- tribe Diptychophorini Gaskin, 1972
  - Cleoeromene Gaskin, 1986
  - Diptychophora Zeller, 1866 (= Colimaea Dyar, 1925, Colimea Błeszyński, 1966, Mysticomima Meyrick, 1931, Scissolia Barnes & McDunnough, 1914)
  - Gargela Walker, 1864 (= Mixophyla Meyrick, 1887, Angonia Snellen, 1893, Mixophila Hampson, 1896)
  - Glaucocharis Meyrick, 1938 (= Pagmania Amsel, 1961, Pareromene Osthelder, 1941, Ditomoptera Hampson, 1893)
  - Incaeromene Gaskin, 1986
  - Neoeromene Gaskin, 1986
  - Peniculimius Schouten, 1994
  - Steneromene Gaskin, 1986
  - Tamsica Zimmerman, 1958
- tribe Euchromiusini Léger, Landry & Nuss, 2019
  - Euchromius Guenée, 1845 (= Eromene Hübner, 1825, Ommatopteryx Kirby, 1897, Pseudoancylolomia Ahmad, Zaidi & Kamaluddin, 1982)
- tribe Haimbachiini B. Landry, 1995
  - Achilo Amsel, 1957 (= Chilopsis Amsel, 1956)
  - Bissetia Kapur, 1950 (= Girdharia Kapur, 1950)
  - Coniesta Hampson, 1919
  - Donacoscaptes Zeller, 1877
  - Eoreuma Ely, 1910
  - Friedlanderia Agnew, 1987 (= Chiloides Amsel, 1949, Chiloides Błeszyński, 1963)
  - Haimbachia Dyar, 1909
  - Neogirdharia Song & Chen in Chen, Song & Yuan, 2004
  - Occidentalia Dyar & Heinrich, 1927
  - Pseudobissetia Błeszyński, 1959
  - Thopeutis Hübner, 1818 (= Cephis Ragonot in Staudinger, 1892, Hombergia de Joannis, 1910, Stenochilo Hampson, 1896, Tetrachila Hübner, 1808, Topeutis Hübner, 1825)
  - Xubida Schaus, 1922

== Former genera ==
- Araxates Ragonot in de Joannis & Ragonot, 1889
- Charitopepla Meyrick, 1933
- Neerupa Hampson, 1919
- Loxophantis Meyrick, 1935
- Welaka Hulst, 1888

== See also ==
- List of crambid genera
