= List of crambid genera: M =

The large moth family Crambidae contains the following genera beginning with "M":

- Mabilleodes
- Mabra
- Macaretaera
- Macreupoca
- Macrobela
- Macrobotys
- Macronomeutis
- Macrospectrodes
- Maelinoptera
- Malaciotis
- Malageudonia
- Malgasochilo
- Malleria
- Maoricrambus
- Maracayia
- Marasmia
- Marasmianympha
- Mardinia
- Margaretania
- Margaritia
- Margarochroma
- Margarosticha
- Maroa
- Maruca - includes Siriocauta
- Marwitzia
- Massepha
- Mecyna
- Mecynarcha
- Meekiaria
- Megaphysa
- Megastes
- Megatarsodes
- Melanochroa
- Melanomecyna
- Meridiophila
- Meroctena
- Merodictya
- Merotoma
- Mesocondyla
- Mesocrambus
- Mesographe
- Mesolia
- Mesopediasia
- Mesothyris
- Mestolobes
- Metaclysta
- Metacrambus
- Metaeuchromius
- Metallarcha
- Metasia
- Metasiodes
- Metathyrida
- Metaxmeste
- Metoeca
- Metoportha
- Metraeopsis
- Metrea
- Micractis
- Micraglossa
- Micrelephas
- Microcausta
- Microcramboides
- Microcrambon
- Microcrambus
- Microdracon
- Micromartinia
- Microphysetica
- Microstega
- Microtalis
- Microtheoris
- Microthyris
- Midila
- Midilambia
- Mimasarta
- Mimetebulea
- Mimocomma
- Mimophobetron
- Mimorista
- Mimoschinia
- Mimudea
- Miraxis
- Mirobriga
- Mixophyla
- Miyakea
- Mnesictena
- Modestia
- Mojavia
- Mojaviodes
- Molybdantha
- Monocona
- Monocoptopera
- Monocrocis
- Morocosma
- Mukia
- Munroeodes
- Munroessa
- Musotima
- Mutuuraia
- Myelobia
- Myeza
- Myriostephes
- Myriotis
- Myrmidonistis
- Mysticomima
