= Mesocrambus canariensis =

Scientific classification
- Kingdom: Animalia
- Phylum: Arthropoda
- Clade: Pancrustacea
- Class: Insecta
- Order: Lepidoptera
- Family: Crambidae
- Subfamily: Crambinae
- Tribe: Crambini
- Genus: Mesocrambus
- Species: M. canariensis

Binomial name
- Mesocrambus canariensis Ganev, 1987

Species of moth

Mesocrambus canariensis is a species of moth in the family Crambidae. It is found on the Canary Islands. Some authors list it as a synonym of Mesocrambus tamsi.
