= Mukia =

Mukia may refer to

- Mukia (moth), a genus of moths
- Mukia (plant), a plant genus considered by some to be a synonym of Cucumis

== See also ==
- Mukhia (disambiguation)
