= Metallarcha achoeusalis =

Scientific classification
- Kingdom: Animalia
- Phylum: Arthropoda
- Class: Insecta
- Order: Lepidoptera
- Family: Crambidae
- Genus: Metallarcha
- Species: M. achoeusalis

Binomial name
- Metallarcha achoeusalis (Walker, 1859)

Synonyms
- Botys achoeusalis Walker, 1859

Species of moth

Metallarcha achoeusalis is a moth in the family Crambidae. It was described by Francis Walker in 1859. It is found in Australia.

The markings of the forewings are similar to Metallarcha eurychrysa, but the pale yellow is replaced by deep orange. The hindwings are deep orange with a dark fuscous hindmarginal band.
