= Archernis fulvalis Hampson, 1913 =

Achernis fulvalis

Scientific classification
- Kingdom: Animalia
- Phylum: Arthropoda
- Clade: Pancrustacea
- Class: Insecta
- Order: Lepidoptera
- Family: Crambidae
- Subfamily: Spilomelinae
- Genus: Archernis
- Species: A. fulvalis

Binomial name
- Archernis fulvalis Hampson, 1913

Species of moth

Archernis fulvalis is a moth in the family Crambidae. It was described by George Hampson in 1913. It is found in French Polynesia, where it has been recorded from the Society Islands.

== Taxonomy ==
The name Archernis fulvalis is preoccupied by Archernis fulvalis described by Hampson in 1899.
