= Gargela xanthocasis =

Scientific classification
- Kingdom: Animalia
- Phylum: Arthropoda
- Clade: Pancrustacea
- Class: Insecta
- Order: Lepidoptera
- Family: Crambidae
- Subfamily: Crambinae
- Tribe: Diptychophorini
- Genus: Gargela
- Species: G. xanthocasis

Binomial name
- Gargela xanthocasis (Meyrick, 1897)

Synonyms
- Mixophyla xanthocasis Meyrick, 1897

Species of moth

Gargela xanthocasis is a moth in the family Crambidae. It was described by Edward Meyrick in 1897. It is found on the Sangir Islands of Indonesia.
