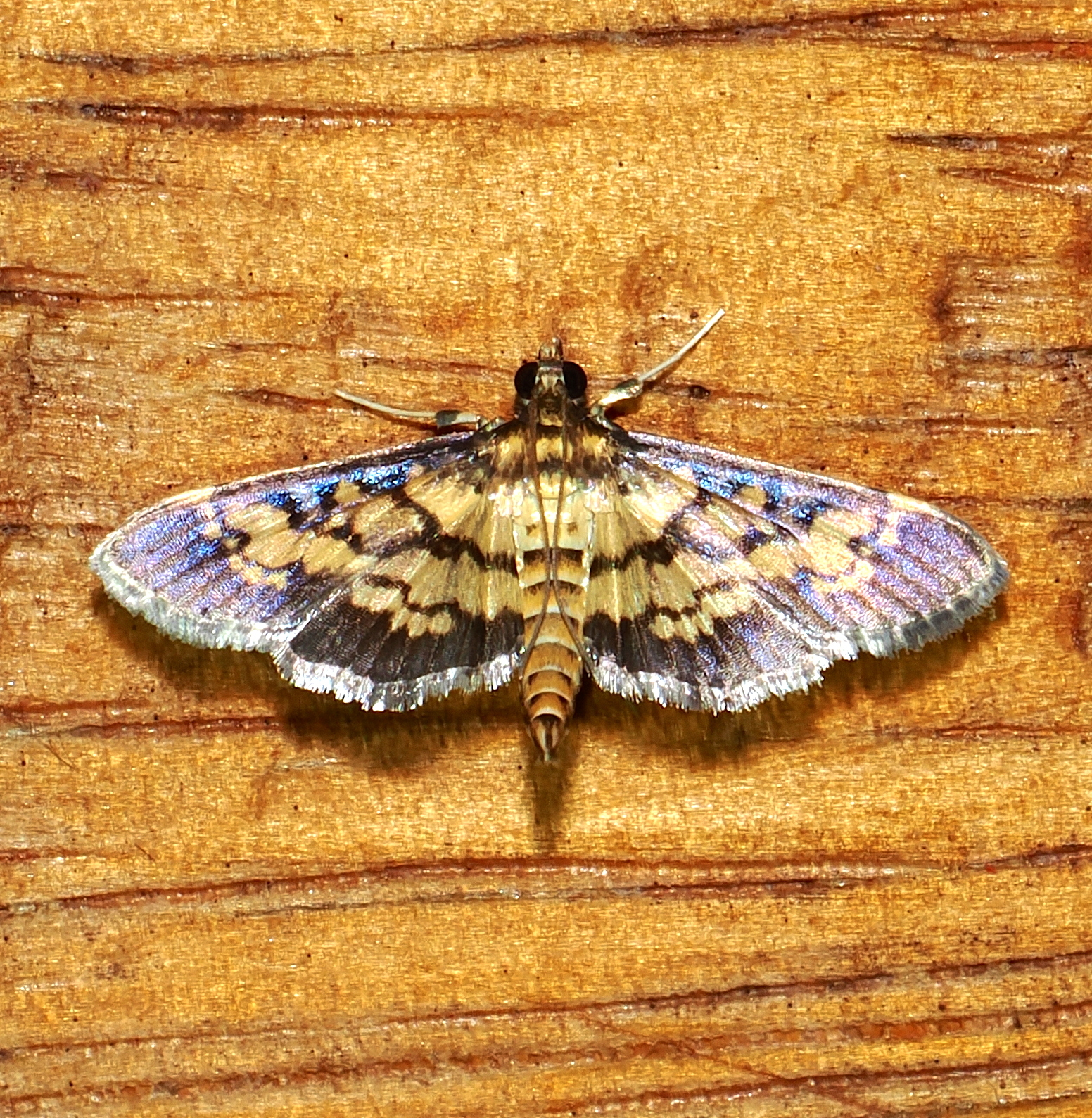

Scientific classification
- Kingdom: Animalia
- Phylum: Arthropoda
- Class: Insecta
- Order: Lepidoptera
- Family: Crambidae
- Genus: Mimorista
- Species: M. botydalis

Binomial name
- Mimorista botydalis (Guenée, 1854)

Synonyms
- Samea botydalis Guenée, 1854; Botys acutalis Snellen, 1875

= Mimorista botydalis =

Species of moth

Mimorista botydalis is a moth in the family Crambidae. It was described by Achille Guenée in 1854. It is found in Brazil, Colombia, Costa Rica and Cuba.
