= Myriostephes rubriceps =

Scientific classification
- Kingdom: Animalia
- Phylum: Arthropoda
- Class: Insecta
- Order: Lepidoptera
- Family: Crambidae
- Genus: Myriostephes
- Species: M. rubriceps

Binomial name
- Myriostephes rubriceps (Hampson, 1903)

Synonyms
- Stenia rubriceps Hampson, 1903

Species of moth

Myriostephes rubriceps is a moth in the family Crambidae. It was described by George Hampson in 1903. It is found in Dharmsala in India and in Australia.
