= Roxita szetschwanella =

Scientific classification
- Domain: Eukaryota
- Kingdom: Animalia
- Phylum: Arthropoda
- Class: Insecta
- Order: Lepidoptera
- Family: Crambidae
- Subfamily: Crambinae
- Tribe: incertae sedis
- Genus: Roxita
- Species: R. szetschwanella

Binomial name
- Roxita szetschwanella (Caradja, 1931)

Synonyms
- Culladia szetschwanella Caradja, 1931; Crambus modestellus Caradja, 1927; Culladia szechwanella Caradja & Meyrick, 1933

Species of moth

Roxita szetschwanella is a moth in the family Crambidae. It was described by Aristide Caradja in 1931. It is found in China.
