= Miyakea consimilis =

Scientific classification
- Domain: Eukaryota
- Kingdom: Animalia
- Phylum: Arthropoda
- Class: Insecta
- Order: Lepidoptera
- Family: Crambidae
- Subfamily: Crambinae
- Tribe: Crambini
- Genus: Miyakea
- Species: M. consimilis

Binomial name
- Miyakea consimilis Sasaki, 2012

Species of moth

Miyakea consimilis is a moth in the family Crambidae. It was described by Sasaki in 2012. It is found in Japan (Honshu).
