= Archernis callixantha =

Scientific classification
- Kingdom: Animalia
- Phylum: Arthropoda
- Clade: Pancrustacea
- Class: Insecta
- Order: Lepidoptera
- Family: Crambidae
- Subfamily: Spilomelinae
- Genus: Archernis
- Species: A. callixantha

Binomial name
- Archernis callixantha Meyrick, 1886

Synonyms
- Chrysommatodes aereoflavalis Warren, 1896

Species of moth

Archernis callixantha is a moth in the family Crambidae. It was described by Edward Meyrick in 1886. It is found on New Guinea and in Australia, where it has been recorded Queensland and New South Wales.
