= Metallarcha tetraplaca =

Scientific classification
- Kingdom: Animalia
- Phylum: Arthropoda
- Class: Insecta
- Order: Lepidoptera
- Family: Crambidae
- Genus: Metallarcha
- Species: M. tetraplaca

Binomial name
- Metallarcha tetraplaca Meyrick, 1887

Synonyms
- Metallarcha grammetalla Lower, 1915

Species of moth

Metallarcha tetraplaca is a moth in the family Crambidae. It was described by Edward Meyrick in 1887. It is found in the Australian state of Western Australia.

The wingspan is about 22 mm. The forewings are clear yellow with light ashy-grey markings, margined with blackish. There is a streak along the costa from the base to four-fifths. The hindwings are fuscous grey, the costa suffusedly whitish ochreous, except on a bar before the middle and another almost apical. The apex and upper half of the hindmargin are narrowly and irregularly pale ochreous yellowish, sometimes continued further towards the anal angle.
