= Roxita eurydyce =

Scientific classification
- Domain: Eukaryota
- Kingdom: Animalia
- Phylum: Arthropoda
- Class: Insecta
- Order: Lepidoptera
- Family: Crambidae
- Subfamily: Crambinae
- Tribe: incertae sedis
- Genus: Roxita
- Species: R. eurydyce

Binomial name
- Roxita eurydyce Błeszyński, 1963

Synonyms
- Culladia szeschwanella f. modesta Caradja & Meyrick, 1933

Species of moth

Roxita eurydyce is a moth in the family Crambidae. It was described by Stanisław Błeszyński in 1963. It is found in Guangdong, China.
