= Archernis eucosma =

Scientific classification
- Kingdom: Animalia
- Phylum: Arthropoda
- Clade: Pancrustacea
- Class: Insecta
- Order: Lepidoptera
- Family: Crambidae
- Subfamily: Spilomelinae
- Genus: Archernis
- Species: A. eucosma

Binomial name
- Archernis eucosma Turner, 1908

Synonyms
- Protonoceras eucosma

Species of moth

Archernis eucosma is a moth in the family Crambidae. It was described by Turner in 1908. It is found in Australia, where it has been recorded inQueensland.
