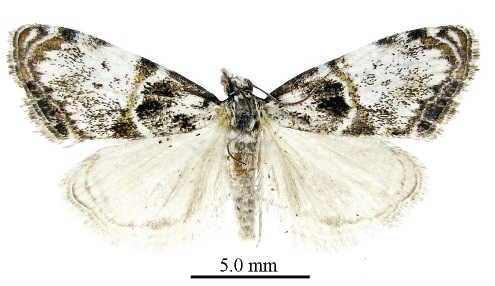

Scientific classification
- Domain: Eukaryota
- Kingdom: Animalia
- Phylum: Arthropoda
- Class: Insecta
- Order: Lepidoptera
- Family: Crambidae
- Subfamily: Crambinae
- Tribe: incertae sedis
- Genus: Metaeuchromius
- Species: M. glacialis

Binomial name
- Metaeuchromius glacialis W.-C. Li, 2015

= Metaeuchromius glacialis =

Species of moth

Metaeuchromius glacialis is a moth in the family Crambidae. It was described by Wei-Chun Li in 2015. It is only known from Galongla Mountain, in Mêdog County in Tibet, China.

The length of the forewings is 9–10 mm. The forewings are densely covered with blackish-brown scales from the basal one fifth to the medial fascia. The other area is sparsely suffused with pale brown scales. The costa has a longitudinal blackish brown stripe extending from the base to near the medial fascia, which is conspicuously convex, incurved slightly near the middle and runs to before the middle of the dorsum. It is golden, edged with pale brown. The discoidal cell has two brown spots and the apex is golden mixed with pale brown, with one white stripe. The subterminal line is golden mixed with pale brown and there are six terminal black dots running from the middle of the termen to the tornus. The hindwings are white, suffused with grey scales. The subterminal fascia is pale brown. Adults have been recorded on wing in late July.

== Etymology ==
The species name is derived from Latin glacialis (meaning glacier) and refers to the species occurrence in the Tibetan glacier area.
