= Mesopediasia hemixanthellus =

Scientific classification
- Kingdom: Animalia
- Phylum: Arthropoda
- Class: Insecta
- Order: Lepidoptera
- Family: Crambidae
- Genus: Mesopediasia
- Species: M. hemixanthellus

Binomial name
- Mesopediasia hemixanthellus (Hampson, 1896)

Synonyms
- Crambus hemixanthellus Hampson, 1896

Species of moth

Mesopediasia hemixanthellus is a moth in the family Crambidae. It was described by George Hampson in 1896. It is found in São Paulo, Brazil.
