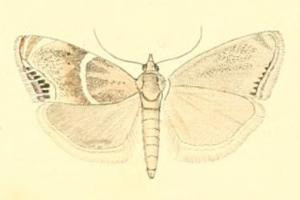

Scientific classification
- Domain: Eukaryota
- Kingdom: Animalia
- Phylum: Arthropoda
- Class: Insecta
- Order: Lepidoptera
- Family: Crambidae
- Genus: Metaeuchromius
- Species: M. lata

Binomial name
- Metaeuchromius lata (Staudinger, 1870)

Synonyms
- Eromene lata Staudinger, 1870

= Metaeuchromius lata =

Species of moth

Metaeuchromius lata is a species of moth in the family Crambidae. It is found in Greece.
