= Metaeuchromius euzonella =

Scientific classification
- Kingdom: Animalia
- Phylum: Arthropoda
- Class: Insecta
- Order: Lepidoptera
- Family: Crambidae
- Genus: Metaeuchromius
- Species: M. euzonella

Binomial name
- Metaeuchromius euzonella (Hampson, 1896)

Synonyms
- Diptychophora euzonella Hampson, 1896

Species of moth

Metaeuchromius euzonella is a moth in the family Crambidae. It was described by George Hampson in 1896. It is found in India (Khasis).
