= Miyakea ussurica =

Scientific classification
- Domain: Eukaryota
- Kingdom: Animalia
- Phylum: Arthropoda
- Class: Insecta
- Order: Lepidoptera
- Family: Crambidae
- Subfamily: Crambinae
- Tribe: Crambini
- Genus: Miyakea
- Species: M. ussurica

Binomial name
- Miyakea ussurica Ustjuzhanin & Schouten, 1995

Species of moth

Miyakea ussurica is a moth in the family Crambidae. It was described by Petr Ya. Ustjuzhanin and Rob T.A. Schouten in 1995. It is found in the Russian Far East.
