= Metaeuchromius changensis =

Scientific classification
- Domain: Eukaryota
- Kingdom: Animalia
- Phylum: Arthropoda
- Class: Insecta
- Order: Lepidoptera
- Family: Crambidae
- Subfamily: Crambinae
- Tribe: incertae sedis
- Genus: Metaeuchromius
- Species: M. changensis

Binomial name
- Metaeuchromius changensis Schouten, 1997

Species of moth

Metaeuchromius changensis is a moth in the family Crambidae. It was described by Schouten in 1997. It is found in China (Hubei).
