= Archernis scopulalis =

Scientific classification
- Domain: Eukaryota
- Kingdom: Animalia
- Phylum: Arthropoda
- Class: Insecta
- Order: Lepidoptera
- Family: Crambidae
- Subfamily: Spilomelinae
- Genus: Archernis
- Species: A. scopulalis

Binomial name
- Archernis scopulalis (Walker, 1865)

Synonyms
- Botys scopulalis Walker, 1865

Species of moth

Archernis scopulalis is a moth in the family Crambidae. It was described by Francis Walker in 1865. It is found in Indonesia, where it has been recorded Flores.
