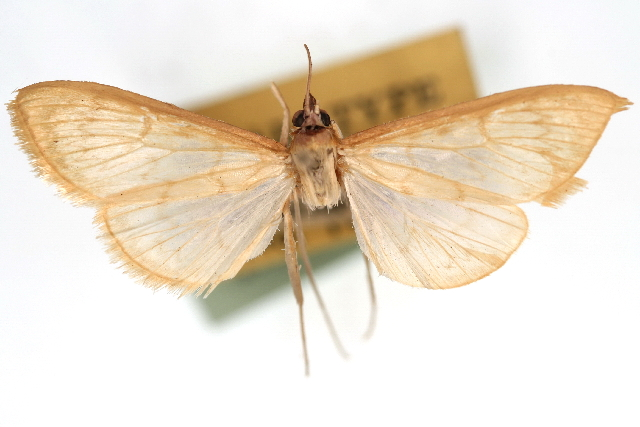

Scientific classification
- Domain: Eukaryota
- Kingdom: Animalia
- Phylum: Arthropoda
- Class: Insecta
- Order: Lepidoptera
- Family: Crambidae
- Genus: Munroeodes
- Species: M. australis

Binomial name
- Munroeodes australis Munroe, 1964

= Munroeodes australis =

Species of moth

Munroeodes australis is a moth in the family Crambidae. It was described by Eugene G. Munroe in 1964. It is found in Santa Catarina, Brazil.
