= Myriostephes crocobapta =

Scientific classification
- Domain: Eukaryota
- Kingdom: Animalia
- Phylum: Arthropoda
- Class: Insecta
- Order: Lepidoptera
- Family: Crambidae
- Genus: Myriostephes
- Species: M. crocobapta

Binomial name
- Myriostephes crocobapta Turner, 1908

Species of moth

Myriostephes crocobapta is a moth in the family Crambidae. It was described by Turner in 1908. It is found in Australia, where it has been recorded from Queensland.

The wingspan is about 14 mm. The forewings are orange-reddish with fuscous markings. The hindwings have the same colour lines as the forewings, but the terminal band is fuscous and is not extended to the postmedian line. It narrows near the mid-termen.
