= Metallarcha erromena =

Scientific classification
- Domain: Eukaryota
- Kingdom: Animalia
- Phylum: Arthropoda
- Class: Insecta
- Order: Lepidoptera
- Family: Crambidae
- Genus: Metallarcha
- Species: M. erromena

Binomial name
- Metallarcha erromena (Turner, 1908)

Synonyms
- Isocentris erromena Turner, 1908

Species of moth

Metallarcha erromena is a moth in the family Crambidae. It was described by Turner in 1908. It is found in Australia, where it has been recorded from Queensland.

The wingspan is about 39 mm. The forewings are dark-fuscous with orange-ochreous markings. There is a small spot at the base of the costa and another on the mid-base, as well as a large quadrangular spot before the middle, unequally divided by a fine fuscous line on the median vein. The hindwings are orange-ochreous with a dark-fuscous antemedian spot and terminal band.
