= Mimorista costistictalis =

Scientific classification
- Kingdom: Animalia
- Phylum: Arthropoda
- Class: Insecta
- Order: Lepidoptera
- Family: Crambidae
- Genus: Mimorista
- Species: M. costistictalis

Binomial name
- Mimorista costistictalis (Hampson, 1918)

Synonyms
- Epipagis costistictalis Hampson, 1918

Species of moth

Mimorista costistictalis is a moth in the family Crambidae. It was described by George Hampson in 1918. It is found in Bolivia.
