= Metallarcha leucodetis =

Scientific classification
- Domain: Eukaryota
- Kingdom: Animalia
- Phylum: Arthropoda
- Class: Insecta
- Order: Lepidoptera
- Family: Crambidae
- Genus: Metallarcha
- Species: M. leucodetis

Binomial name
- Metallarcha leucodetis (Lower, 1899)

Synonyms
- Criophthona leucodetis Lower, 1899

Species of moth

Metallarcha leucodetis is a moth in the family Crambidae. It was described by Oswald Bertram Lower in 1899. It is found in Australia, where it has been recorded from New South Wales and South Australia.
