= Metasiodes heliaula =

Scientific classification
- Kingdom: Animalia
- Phylum: Arthropoda
- Class: Insecta
- Order: Lepidoptera
- Family: Crambidae
- Genus: Metasiodes
- Species: M. heliaula

Binomial name
- Metasiodes heliaula Meyrick, 1894

Species of moth

Metasiodes heliaula is a moth belonging to the family Crambidae. It was described by Edward Meyrick in 1894. It is found in Myanmar.
