= Miyakea sinevi =

Scientific classification
- Domain: Eukaryota
- Kingdom: Animalia
- Phylum: Arthropoda
- Class: Insecta
- Order: Lepidoptera
- Family: Crambidae
- Subfamily: Crambinae
- Tribe: Crambini
- Genus: Miyakea
- Species: M. sinevi

Binomial name
- Miyakea sinevi Schouten, 1992

Species of moth

Miyakea sinevi is a moth in the family Crambidae. It was described by Schouten in 1992. It is found in Mongolia.
