= Gargela subpurella =

Scientific classification
- Kingdom: Animalia
- Phylum: Arthropoda
- Clade: Pancrustacea
- Class: Insecta
- Order: Lepidoptera
- Family: Crambidae
- Subfamily: Crambinae
- Tribe: Diptychophorini
- Genus: Gargela
- Species: G. subpurella

Binomial name
- Gargela subpurella Walker, 1864

Species of moth

Gargela subpurella is a moth in the family Crambidae. It was described by Francis Walker in 1864. It is found in Sri Lanka.
