= Mesocondyla dardusalis =

Scientific classification
- Kingdom: Animalia
- Phylum: Arthropoda
- Class: Insecta
- Order: Lepidoptera
- Family: Crambidae
- Genus: Mesocondyla
- Species: M. dardusalis

Binomial name
- Mesocondyla dardusalis (Walker, 1859)

Synonyms
- Phakellura dardusalis Walker, 1859; Mesocondyla stigmatalis Lederer, 1863

Species of moth

Mesocondyla dardusalis is a moth in the family Crambidae. It was described by Francis Walker in 1859. It is found in Brazil.
