= Metacrambus kurdistanellus =

Scientific classification
- Kingdom: Animalia
- Phylum: Arthropoda
- Clade: Pancrustacea
- Class: Insecta
- Order: Lepidoptera
- Family: Crambidae
- Subfamily: Crambinae
- Tribe: Crambini
- Genus: Metacrambus
- Species: M. kurdistanellus

Binomial name
- Metacrambus kurdistanellus (Amsel, 1959)

Synonyms
- Mesocrambus kurdistanellus Amsel, 1959

Species of moth

Metacrambus kurdistanellus is a moth in the family Crambidae. It was described by Hans Georg Amsel in 1959 and is found in Iraq.
