= Metacrambus carectellus =

Scientific classification
- Kingdom: Animalia
- Phylum: Arthropoda
- Clade: Pancrustacea
- Class: Insecta
- Order: Lepidoptera
- Family: Crambidae
- Subfamily: Crambinae
- Tribe: Crambini
- Genus: Metacrambus
- Species: M. carectellus

Binomial name
- Metacrambus carectellus (Zeller, 1847)

Synonyms
- Crambus carectellus Zeller, 1847; Crambus lugdunellus Millière, 1867

Species of moth

Metacrambus carectellus is a species of moth in the family Crambidae. It is found in Portugal, Spain, France, Italy, the Balkan Peninsula, Ukraine, Russia, Transcaucasia, Asia Minor, the Palestinian Territories, Lebanon, Syria, Iran and Uzbekistan.

The wingspan is 18–23 mm. Adults are on wing in July and August in one generation per year.

The larvae feed on various grasses.
