= Myriostephes matura =

Scientific classification
- Domain: Eukaryota
- Kingdom: Animalia
- Phylum: Arthropoda
- Class: Insecta
- Order: Lepidoptera
- Family: Crambidae
- Genus: Myriostephes
- Species: M. matura

Binomial name
- Myriostephes matura Meyrick, 1884

Species of moth

Myriostephes matura is a moth in the family Crambidae. It was described by Edward Meyrick in 1884. It is found in Australia, where it has been recorded from Queensland and New South Wales.

The wingspan is 11–14 mm. The forewings are ochreous yellow, often shading to brownish ochreous posteriorly. The costal edge is dark fuscous from the base to beyond the middle and then yellowish white to four-fifths. The lines are ochreous fuscous. The hindwings are yellow ochreous, posteriorly suffused with fuscous and with a faint discal spot.
