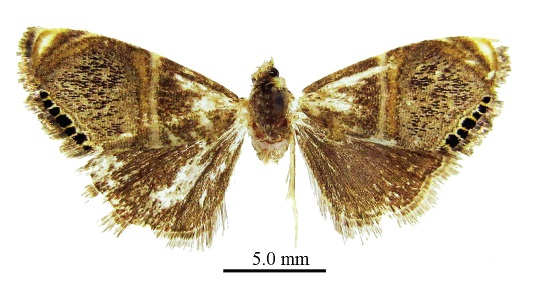

Scientific classification
- Domain: Eukaryota
- Kingdom: Animalia
- Phylum: Arthropoda
- Class: Insecta
- Order: Lepidoptera
- Family: Crambidae
- Subfamily: Crambinae
- Tribe: incertae sedis
- Genus: Metaeuchromius
- Species: M. circe

Binomial name
- Metaeuchromius circe Błeszyński, 1965

= Metaeuchromius circe =

Species of moth

Metaeuchromius circe is a moth in the family Crambidae. It was described by Stanisław Błeszyński in 1965. It is found in Sichuan, China.
