= Myriostephes leucostictalis =

Scientific classification
- Kingdom: Animalia
- Phylum: Arthropoda
- Clade: Pancrustacea
- Class: Insecta
- Order: Lepidoptera
- Family: Crambidae
- Genus: Myriostephes
- Species: M. leucostictalis

Binomial name
- Myriostephes leucostictalis (Hampson, 1899)

Synonyms
- Pionea leucostictalis Hampson, 1899

Species of moth

Myriostephes leucostictalis is a moth in the family Crambidae. It was described by George Hampson in 1899. It is found in Australia, where it has been recorded from Queensland.

The wingspan is about 20 mm. Adults are fuscous, the forewings with traces of an antemedial line, as well as a dark discoidal point and an indistinct postmedial line. The outer half of the costa has five prominent pure white spots. The hindwings have an indistinct postmedial line. Both the forewings and hindwings have a dark terminal line.
