= Metallarcha aureodiscalis =

Scientific classification
- Kingdom: Animalia
- Phylum: Arthropoda
- Class: Insecta
- Order: Lepidoptera
- Family: Crambidae
- Genus: Metallarcha
- Species: M. aureodiscalis

Binomial name
- Metallarcha aureodiscalis (Hampson, 1918)

Synonyms
- Loxostege aureodiscalis Hampson, 1918; Metallarcha umbrifera Turner, 1937

Species of moth

Metallarcha aureodiscalis is a moth in the family Crambidae. It was described by George Hampson in 1918. It is found in Australia.
