= Archernis mitis =

Scientific classification
- Kingdom: Animalia
- Phylum: Arthropoda
- Clade: Pancrustacea
- Class: Insecta
- Order: Lepidoptera
- Family: Crambidae
- Subfamily: Spilomelinae
- Genus: Archernis
- Species: A. mitis

Binomial name
- Archernis mitis Turner, 1937

Synonyms
- Protonoceras mitis

Species of moth

Archernis mitis is a moth in the family Crambidae. It was described by Turner in 1937. It is found in Taiwan and Australia, where it has been recorded in Queensland and New South Wales.

The wingspan is about 20 mm.
