= Metallarcha crocanthes =

Scientific classification
- Domain: Eukaryota
- Kingdom: Animalia
- Phylum: Arthropoda
- Class: Insecta
- Order: Lepidoptera
- Family: Crambidae
- Genus: Metallarcha
- Species: M. crocanthes

Binomial name
- Metallarcha crocanthes Lower, 1896

Synonyms
- Phlyctaenodes chrysalis Hampson, 1913

Species of moth

Metallarcha crocanthes is a moth in the family Crambidae. It was described by Oswald Bertram Lower in 1896. It is found in Australia.
