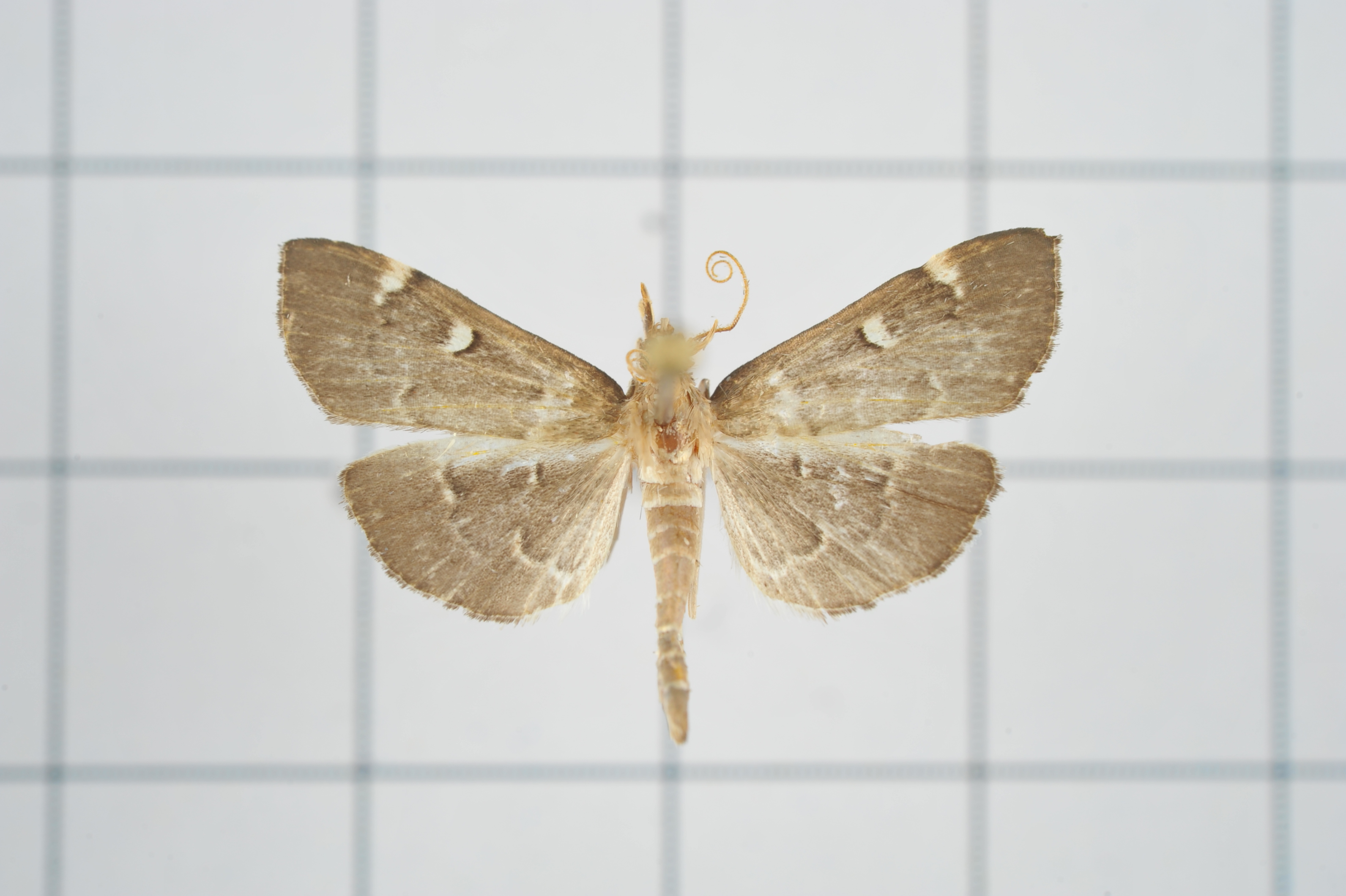

Scientific classification
- Domain: Eukaryota
- Kingdom: Animalia
- Phylum: Arthropoda
- Class: Insecta
- Order: Lepidoptera
- Family: Crambidae
- Subfamily: Spilomelinae
- Genus: Archernis
- Species: A. capitalis

Binomial name
- Archernis capitalis (Fabricius, 1794)

Synonyms
- Phalaena capitalis Fabricius, 1794; Botys tropicalis Walker, 1859

= Archernis capitalis =

Species of moth

Archernis capitalis is a moth in the family Crambidae. It was described by Johan Christian Fabricius in 1794. It is found in India and Sri Lanka.
