= Archernis argocephala =

Scientific classification
- Kingdom: Animalia
- Phylum: Arthropoda
- Clade: Pancrustacea
- Class: Insecta
- Order: Lepidoptera
- Family: Crambidae
- Subfamily: Spilomelinae
- Genus: Archernis
- Species: A. argocephala

Binomial name
- Archernis argocephala (Lower, 1903)

Synonyms
- Archernis metriodes Turner, 1908; Protonoceras argocephala

Species of moth

Archernis argocephala is a moth in the family Crambidae. It was described by Oswald Bertram Lower in 1903. It is found in Australia, where it has been recorded Queensland.

The wingspan is about 29 mm. The forewings are pale-brown with a fuscous median discal mark and a fine wavy fuscous line from the costa towards the tornus. The hindwings are as the forewings, but the discal mark is straight. Adults have been recorded on wing in March.
