= Gargela niphostola =

Scientific classification
- Kingdom: Animalia
- Phylum: Arthropoda
- Clade: Pancrustacea
- Class: Insecta
- Order: Lepidoptera
- Family: Crambidae
- Subfamily: Crambinae
- Tribe: Diptychophorini
- Genus: Gargela
- Species: G. niphostola

Binomial name
- Gargela niphostola Hampson, 1917

Species of moth

Gargela niphostola is a moth in the family Crambidae. It was described by George Hampson in 1917. It is found on Fergusson Island in Papua New Guinea.
