= Metallarcha epichrysa =

Scientific classification
- Kingdom: Animalia
- Phylum: Arthropoda
- Class: Insecta
- Order: Lepidoptera
- Family: Crambidae
- Genus: Metallarcha
- Species: M. epichrysa

Binomial name
- Metallarcha epichrysa Meyrick, 1884

Species of moth

Metallarcha epichrysa is a moth in the family Crambidae. It was described by Edward Meyrick in 1884. It is found in Australia, where it has been recorded from South Australia.
