= Microcausta bipunctalis =

Scientific classification
- Kingdom: Animalia
- Phylum: Arthropoda
- Class: Insecta
- Order: Lepidoptera
- Family: Crambidae
- Genus: Microcausta
- Species: M. bipunctalis

Binomial name
- Microcausta bipunctalis Barnes & McDunnough, 1914

Species of moth

Microcausta bipunctalis is a moth in the family Crambidae. It was described by William Barnes and James Halliday McDunnough in 1914. It is found in North America, where it has been recorded from Arizona.
