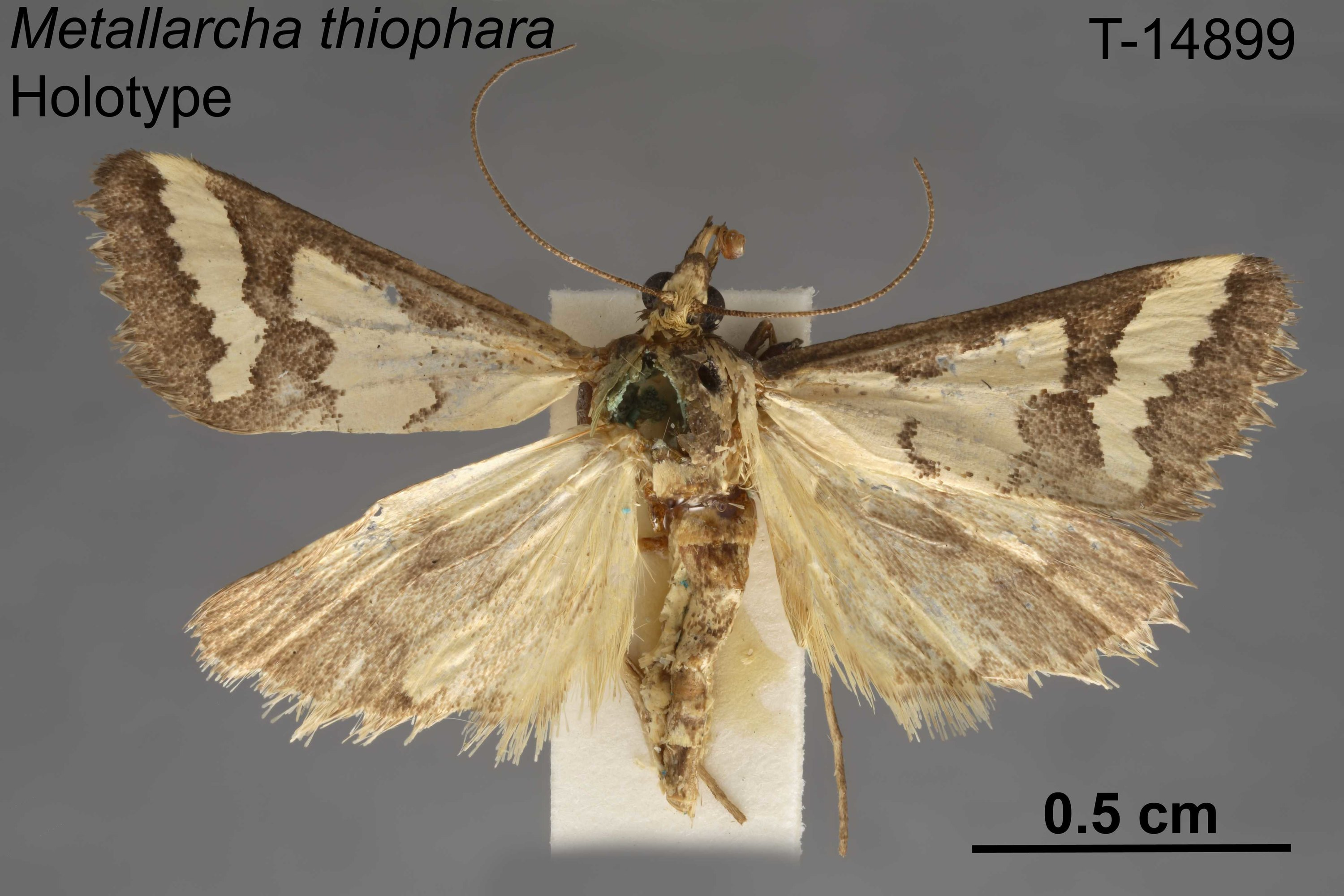
- holotype

Scientific classification
- Kingdom: Animalia
- Phylum: Arthropoda
- Class: Insecta
- Order: Lepidoptera
- Family: Crambidae
- Genus: Metallarcha
- Species: M. thiophara

Binomial name
- Metallarcha thiophara Turner, 1917

= Metallarcha thiophara =

Species of moth

Metallarcha thiophara is a moth in the family Crambidae. It was described by Turner in 1917. It is found in Australia, where it has been recorded from Western Australia.

The wingspan is about 23 mm. The forewings are pale yellow with fuscous markings. There is a costal streak from the base and a short inwardly oblique fine streak from the dorsum, as well as a broad terminal band. The hindwings are pale ochreous with some pale fuscous irroration and a large pale fuscous apical patch.

It is found in South Australia, Western Australia, and the Northern Territory.
