= Mimorista trimaculalis =

Scientific classification
- Kingdom: Animalia
- Phylum: Arthropoda
- Class: Insecta
- Order: Lepidoptera
- Family: Crambidae
- Genus: Mimorista
- Species: M. trimaculalis

Binomial name
- Mimorista trimaculalis (Grote, 1878)

Synonyms
- Botis trimaculalis Grote, 1878

Species of moth

Mimorista trimaculalis is a moth in the family Crambidae. It was described by Augustus Radcliffe Grote in 1878. It is found in North America, where it has been recorded from Arizona, California, Nevada, New Mexico, Texas and Utah.

The wingspan is about 24 mm. Adults are on wing from May to September.
