= Mesopediasia psyche =

Scientific classification
- Domain: Eukaryota
- Kingdom: Animalia
- Phylum: Arthropoda
- Class: Insecta
- Order: Lepidoptera
- Family: Crambidae
- Subfamily: Crambinae
- Tribe: Crambini
- Genus: Mesopediasia
- Species: M. psyche

Binomial name
- Mesopediasia psyche Błeszyński, 1963

Species of moth

Mesopediasia psyche is a moth in the family Crambidae. It was described by Stanisław Błeszyński in 1963. It is found in Paraná, Brazil.
