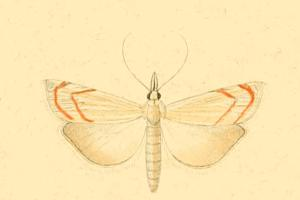

Scientific classification
- Kingdom: Animalia
- Phylum: Arthropoda
- Clade: Pancrustacea
- Class: Insecta
- Order: Lepidoptera
- Family: Crambidae
- Subfamily: Crambinae
- Tribe: Crambini
- Genus: Metacrambus
- Species: M. pallidellus

Binomial name
- Metacrambus pallidellus (Duponchel, 1836)

Synonyms
- Crambus pallidellus Duponchel, 1836

= Metacrambus pallidellus =

Species of moth

Metacrambus pallidellus is a species of moth in the family Crambidae described by Philogène Auguste Joseph Duponchel in 1836. It is found in France, Italy, Spain and Portugal, as well as North Africa, including Morocco, Algeria and Tunisia.
