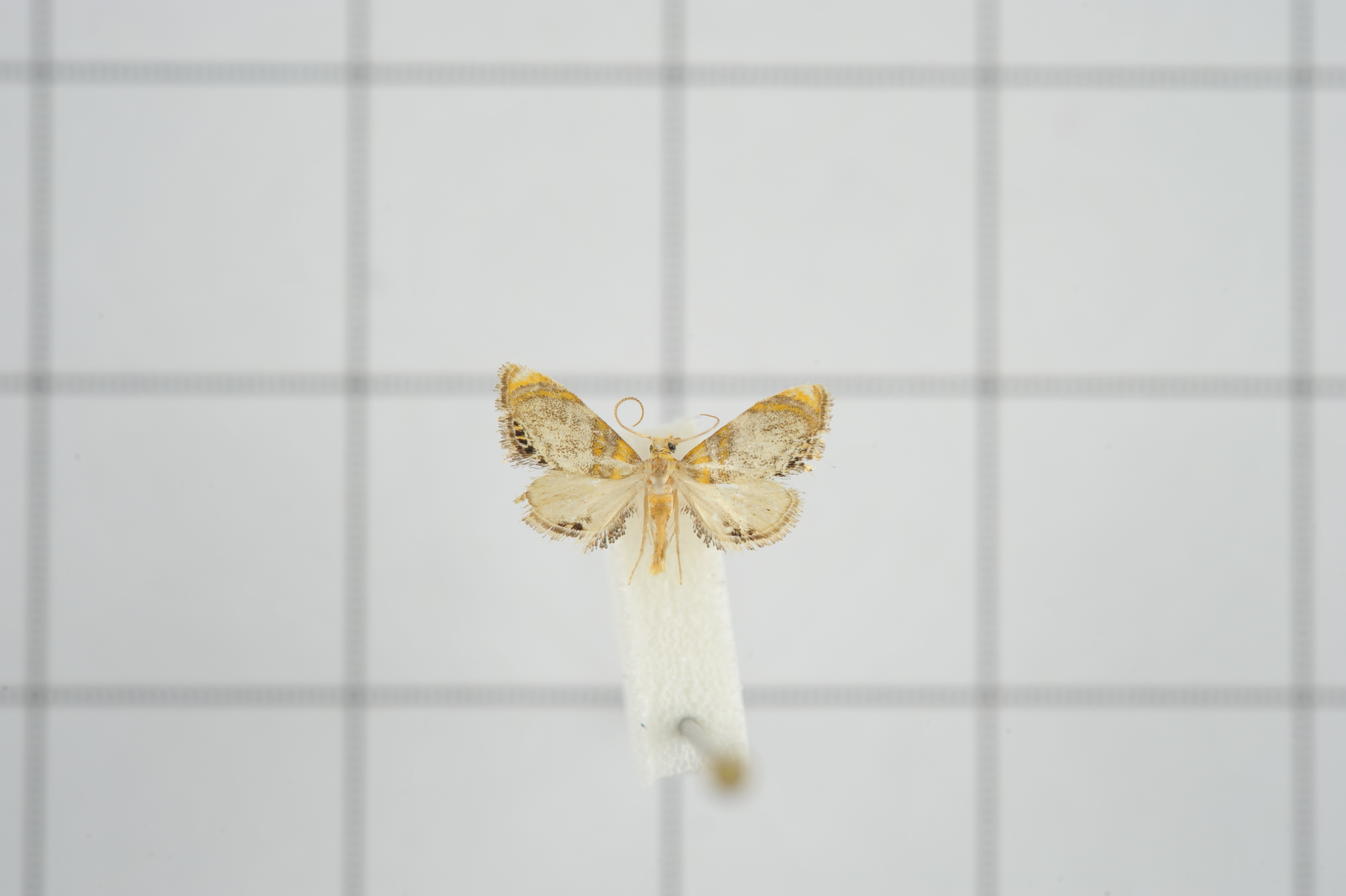

Scientific classification
- Domain: Eukaryota
- Kingdom: Animalia
- Phylum: Arthropoda
- Class: Insecta
- Order: Lepidoptera
- Family: Crambidae
- Subfamily: Crambinae
- Tribe: incertae sedis
- Genus: Metaeuchromius
- Species: M. anacanthus

Binomial name
- Metaeuchromius anacanthus W. Li & H. Li in Li, Li & Nuss, 2009

= Metaeuchromius anacanthus =

Species of moth

Metaeuchromius anacanthus is a moth in the family Crambidae. It was described by W. Li and H. Li in 2009. It is found in China (Hainan).
