= Mimorista marginalis =

Scientific classification
- Kingdom: Animalia
- Phylum: Arthropoda
- Class: Insecta
- Order: Lepidoptera
- Family: Crambidae
- Genus: Mimorista
- Species: M. marginalis

Binomial name
- Mimorista marginalis Warren, 1896

Species of moth

Mimorista marginalis is a moth in the family Crambidae. It was described by Warren in 1896. It is found in India (Meghalaya).
