= Archernis lugens =

Scientific classification
- Domain: Eukaryota
- Kingdom: Animalia
- Phylum: Arthropoda
- Class: Insecta
- Order: Lepidoptera
- Family: Crambidae
- Subfamily: Spilomelinae
- Genus: Archernis
- Species: A. lugens

Binomial name
- Archernis lugens (Warren, 1896)

Synonyms
- Protonoceras lugens Warren, 1896

Species of moth

Archernis lugens is a moth in the family Crambidae. It was described by William Warren in 1896. It is found in India.

The wingspan is 24–30 mm. The forewings are of a dark mouse colour, with blackish lines. The hindwings are somewhat darker, with a blackish cell-spot and outer line as in forewings.
