= Archernis dolopsalis =

Scientific classification
- Kingdom: Animalia
- Phylum: Arthropoda
- Class: Insecta
- Order: Lepidoptera
- Family: Crambidae
- Subfamily: Spilomelinae
- Genus: Archernis
- Species: A. dolopsalis

Binomial name
- Archernis dolopsalis (Walker, 1859)

Synonyms
- Botys dolopsalis Walker, 1859; Protonoceras dolopsalis; Botys fimbripunctalis Walker, [1866]; Protonoceras fuscilunalis Hampson, 1891

Species of moth

Archernis dolopsalis is a moth in the family Crambidae. It was described by Francis Walker in 1859. It is found on Borneo, Mysol and in southern India, Sri Lanka and Burma.
