= Roxita adspersella =

Scientific classification
- Kingdom: Animalia
- Phylum: Arthropoda
- Class: Insecta
- Order: Lepidoptera
- Family: Crambidae
- Subfamily: Crambinae
- Tribe: incertae sedis
- Genus: Roxita
- Species: R. adspersella

Binomial name
- Roxita adspersella (Snellen, 1893)

Synonyms
- Diptychophora adspersella Snellen, 1893

Species of moth

Roxita adspersella is a moth in the family Crambidae. It was described by Pieter Cornelius Tobias Snellen in 1893. It is found in Sri Lanka.

== Description ==
The wingspan is about 10 mm. In the male, the head is white. Palpi brown at sides. Thorax yellowish brown. Abdomen pale. Forewings yellowish white. The basal area irrorated (sprinkled) with dark scales. A slightly oblique double medial dark line becoming orange at costa, the area beyond it whitish, followed by a series of dark streaks in the interspaces, then a series of orange streaks on the veins on the inner side of the fuscous submarginal line, which is angled outwards to the margin at vein 5. Two black marginal specks below middle. Cilia silvery fuscous. Hindwings yellowish white, with dark marginal line on apical area. Ventral side of forewings fuscous, the marginal area pale, yellow at apex.
