= Metacrambus deprinsi =

Scientific classification
- Kingdom: Animalia
- Phylum: Arthropoda
- Clade: Pancrustacea
- Class: Insecta
- Order: Lepidoptera
- Family: Crambidae
- Subfamily: Crambinae
- Tribe: Crambini
- Genus: Metacrambus
- Species: M. deprinsi

Binomial name
- Metacrambus deprinsi Ganev, 1990

Species of moth

Metacrambus deprinsi is a moth in the family Crambidae. It was described by Julius Ganev in 1990. It is found in Afghanistan.
