= Metallarcha chrysitis =

Scientific classification
- Domain: Eukaryota
- Kingdom: Animalia
- Phylum: Arthropoda
- Class: Insecta
- Order: Lepidoptera
- Family: Crambidae
- Genus: Metallarcha
- Species: M. chrysitis

Binomial name
- Metallarcha chrysitis Turner, 1941

Species of moth

Metallarcha chrysitis is a moth in the family Crambidae. It was described by Turner in 1941. It is found in Australia, where it has been recorded from Western Australia.
