= Metaeuchromius yuennanensis =

Scientific classification
- Kingdom: Animalia
- Phylum: Arthropoda
- Class: Insecta
- Order: Lepidoptera
- Family: Crambidae
- Genus: Metaeuchromius
- Species: M. yuennanensis

Binomial name
- Metaeuchromius yuennanensis (Caradja in Caradja & Meyrick, 1937)

Synonyms
- Eromene yuennanensis Caradja in Caradja & Meyrick, 1937

Species of moth

Metaeuchromius yuennanensis is a moth in the family Crambidae. It was described by Aristide Caradja in 1937. It is found in China (Yunnan, Tibet).

== Subspecies ==
- Metaeuchromius yuennanensis yuennanensis (Yunnan)
- Metaeuchromius yuennanensis tibetanus Bleszynski, 1965 (Tibet)
