= Miyakea raddeella =

Scientific classification
- Domain: Eukaryota
- Kingdom: Animalia
- Phylum: Arthropoda
- Class: Insecta
- Order: Lepidoptera
- Family: Crambidae
- Subfamily: Crambinae
- Tribe: Crambini
- Genus: Miyakea
- Species: M. raddeella

Binomial name
- Miyakea raddeella (Caradja, 1910)

Synonyms
- Eromene bella var. raddeella Caradja, 1910; Miyakea raddeellus

Species of moth

Miyakea raddeella is a moth in the family Crambidae. It was described by Aristide Caradja in 1910. It is found in China (Beijing, Guangxi, Guizhou, Hebei, Heilongjiang, Henan, Hubei, Shaanxi, Tianjin, Tibet, Zhejiang), Korea and Russia.

The wingspan is 17–25 mm.
