= Gargela apicalis =

Scientific classification
- Kingdom: Animalia
- Phylum: Arthropoda
- Clade: Pancrustacea
- Class: Insecta
- Order: Lepidoptera
- Family: Crambidae
- Subfamily: Crambinae
- Tribe: Diptychophorini
- Genus: Gargela
- Species: G. apicalis

Binomial name
- Gargela apicalis (Pagenstecher, 1900)

Synonyms
- Mixophyla apicalis Pagenstecher, 1900

Species of moth

Gargela apicalis is a moth in the family Crambidae. It was described by Pagenstecher in 1900. It is found on the Bismarck Archipelago.
