= Archernis obliquialis =

Scientific classification
- Domain: Eukaryota
- Kingdom: Animalia
- Phylum: Arthropoda
- Class: Insecta
- Order: Lepidoptera
- Family: Crambidae
- Subfamily: Spilomelinae
- Genus: Archernis
- Species: A. obliquialis

Binomial name
- Archernis obliquialis Hampson, 1896

Synonyms
- Protonoceras obliquialis

Species of moth

Archernis obliquialis is a moth in the family Crambidae. It was described by George Hampson in 1896. It is found in Sikkim, India.
