= Mesocrambus candiellus =

Scientific classification
- Kingdom: Animalia
- Phylum: Arthropoda
- Clade: Pancrustacea
- Class: Insecta
- Order: Lepidoptera
- Family: Crambidae
- Genus: Mesocrambus
- Species: M. candiellus

Binomial name
- Mesocrambus candiellus (Herrich-Schaffer, 1848)

Synonyms
- Crambus candiellus Herrich-Schaffer, 1848

Species of moth

Mesocrambus candiellus is a species of moth in the family Crambidae described by Gottlieb August Wilhelm Herrich-Schäffer in 1848. It is found in Portugal, Spain, Italy, on the Balkan Peninsula and in Russia, Asia Minor and Syria.
