= Metallarcha pseliota =

Scientific classification
- Kingdom: Animalia
- Phylum: Arthropoda
- Class: Insecta
- Order: Lepidoptera
- Family: Crambidae
- Genus: Metallarcha
- Species: M. pseliota

Binomial name
- Metallarcha pseliota Meyrick, 1887

Species of moth

Metallarcha pseliota is a moth in the family Crambidae. It was described by Edward Meyrick in 1887. It is found in Australia, where it has been recorded from Western Australia.

The wingspan is 18–20 mm. The forewings are white, slightly ochreous tinged. The markings are blackish, consisting of a somewhat irregular streak along the costa from the base to four-fifths and a semi-oval spot on the inner margin at one-third, beyond which the inner margin is ochreous yellow. There is a blackish hind marginal band, closely approaching second line containing a submarginal series of seven round deep ochreous-yellow spots. The hindwings are ochreous yellow with a dark fuscous irregular fascia from the apex towards two-thirds of the inner margin.
