= Metacrambus salahinellus =

Scientific classification
- Kingdom: Animalia
- Phylum: Arthropoda
- Clade: Pancrustacea
- Class: Insecta
- Order: Lepidoptera
- Family: Crambidae
- Subfamily: Crambinae
- Tribe: Crambini
- Genus: Metacrambus
- Species: M. salahinellus

Binomial name
- Metacrambus salahinellus (Chretien, 1917)

Synonyms
- Crambus salahinellus Chrétien, 1917

Species of moth

Metacrambus salahinellus is a species of moth in the family Crambidae described by Pierre Chrétien in 1917. It is found on Sardinia and in Spain, as well as North Africa, including Morocco, Algeria and Libya.
