= Mesocondyla tarsibarbalis =

Scientific classification
- Kingdom: Animalia
- Phylum: Arthropoda
- Class: Insecta
- Order: Lepidoptera
- Family: Crambidae
- Genus: Mesocondyla
- Species: M. tarsibarbalis

Binomial name
- Mesocondyla tarsibarbalis Hampson, 1899

Species of moth

Mesocondyla tarsibarbalis is a moth in the family Crambidae. It was described by George Hampson in 1899. It is found in Pará, Brazil.
