= Metallarcha zygosema =

Scientific classification
- Domain: Eukaryota
- Kingdom: Animalia
- Phylum: Arthropoda
- Class: Insecta
- Order: Lepidoptera
- Family: Crambidae
- Genus: Metallarcha
- Species: M. zygosema

Binomial name
- Metallarcha zygosema Lower, 1897

Species of moth

Metallarcha zygosema is a moth in the family Crambidae. It was described by Oswald Bertram Lower in 1897. It is found in Australia, where it has been recorded from Western Australia and South Australia.

The wingspan is about 20 mm. The forewings are light brown, with pale yellow markings outlined with darker brown. There is a large irregular cuneiform (wedge-shaped) patch from the base below the costa, its lower edge emitting a long slender streak along the inner margin to the anal angle. There is also a large irregular lunate mark in the middle of the wing, connected with the basal patch anteriorly by a short bar. The hindmarginal line is narrow and yellowish. The hindwings are pale fuscous, with a pale yellow basal patch.
