= Roxita fletcheri =

Scientific classification
- Kingdom: Animalia
- Phylum: Arthropoda
- Clade: Pancrustacea
- Class: Insecta
- Order: Lepidoptera
- Family: Crambidae
- Subfamily: Crambinae
- Tribe: incertae sedis
- Genus: Roxita
- Species: R. fletcheri

Binomial name
- Roxita fletcheri Gaskin, 1984

Species of moth

Roxita fletcheri is a moth in the family Crambidae. It was described by David E. Gaskin in 1984. It is found in Himachal Pradesh, India.
