= Metacrambus jugaraicae =

Scientific classification
- Kingdom: Animalia
- Phylum: Arthropoda
- Clade: Pancrustacea
- Class: Insecta
- Order: Lepidoptera
- Family: Crambidae
- Subfamily: Crambinae
- Tribe: Crambini
- Genus: Metacrambus
- Species: M. jugaraicae

Binomial name
- Metacrambus jugaraicae Błeszyński, 1965

Species of moth

Metacrambus jugaraicae is a moth in the family Crambidae. It was described by Stanisław Błeszyński in 1965. It is found in Kazakhstan.
