= Metaeuchromius flavofascialis =

Scientific classification
- Kingdom: Animalia
- Phylum: Arthropoda
- Clade: Pancrustacea
- Class: Insecta
- Order: Lepidoptera
- Family: Crambidae
- Subfamily: Crambinae
- Tribe: incertae sedis
- Genus: Metaeuchromius
- Species: M. flavofascialis

Binomial name
- Metaeuchromius flavofascialis Park, 1990

Species of moth

Metaeuchromius flavofascialis is a moth in the family Crambidae. It was described by Kyu-Tek Park in 1990. It is found in South Korea.
