= Metaeuchromius kimurai =

Scientific classification
- Domain: Eukaryota
- Kingdom: Animalia
- Phylum: Arthropoda
- Class: Insecta
- Order: Lepidoptera
- Family: Crambidae
- Subfamily: Crambinae
- Tribe: incertae sedis
- Genus: Metaeuchromius
- Species: M. kimurai

Binomial name
- Metaeuchromius kimurai Sasaki, 2005

Species of moth

Metaeuchromius kimurai Japanese: カナサンツトガ, romanized: Kanasantsutoga) is a moth in the family Crambidae. It was described by Sasaki in 2005. It is found in Japan on the Okinawa Islands.
