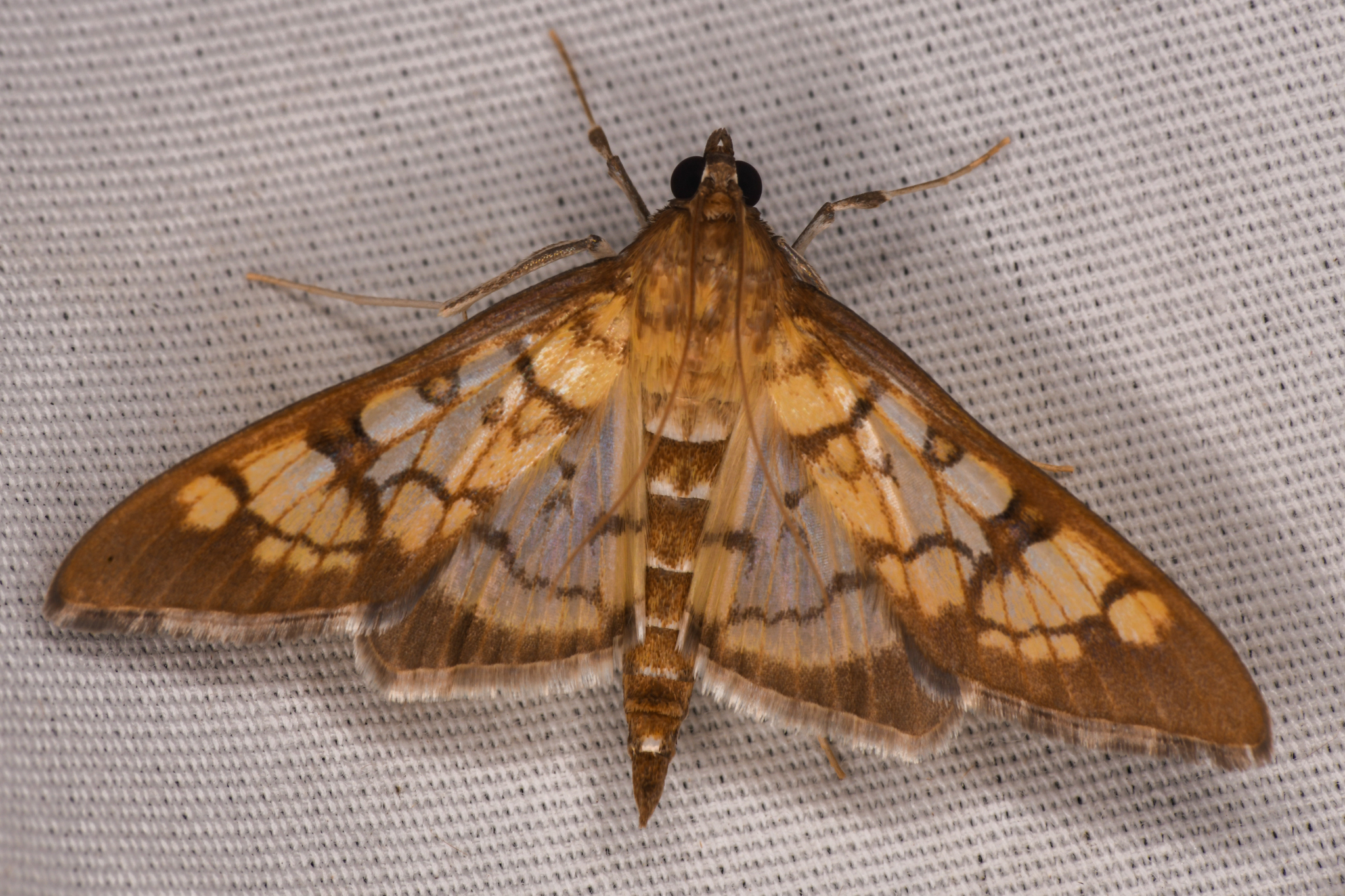

Scientific classification
- Kingdom: Animalia
- Phylum: Arthropoda
- Clade: Pancrustacea
- Class: Insecta
- Order: Lepidoptera
- Family: Crambidae
- Genus: Mimorista
- Species: M. subcostalis

Binomial name
- Mimorista subcostalis (Hampson, 1913)

Synonyms
- Sameodes subcostalis Hampson, 1913

= Mimorista subcostalis =

Species of moth

Mimorista subcostalis is a moth in the family Crambidae. It was described by George Hampson in 1913. The species is distributed across North America and has been documented in the states of Arizona, California, Colorado, Nevada, Oklahoma and Texas.

The length of the forewings is 15.5-19.5 mm. Adults are on wing from April to October.
