= Metasiodes achromatias =

Scientific classification
- Kingdom: Animalia
- Phylum: Arthropoda
- Class: Insecta
- Order: Lepidoptera
- Family: Crambidae
- Genus: Metasiodes
- Species: M. achromatias

Binomial name
- Metasiodes achromatias Meyrick, 1894

Species of moth

Metasiodes achromatias is a moth in the family Crambidae. It was described by Edward Meyrick in 1894. It is found on Sumbawa in Indonesia.
