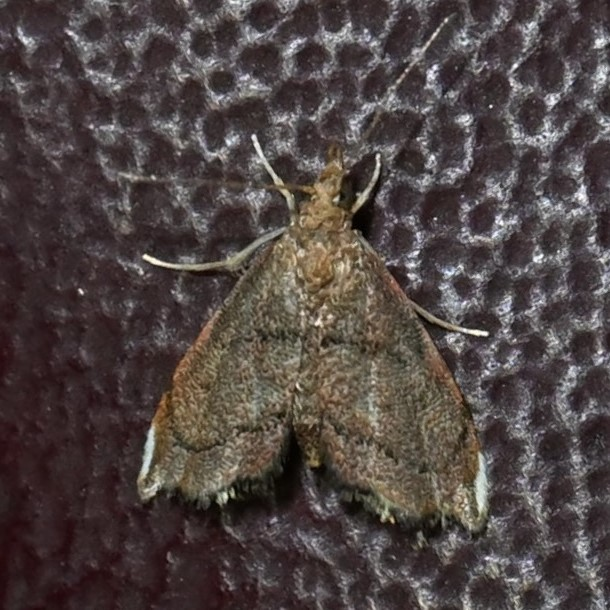

Scientific classification
- Kingdom: Animalia
- Phylum: Arthropoda
- Clade: Pancrustacea
- Class: Insecta
- Order: Lepidoptera
- Family: Crambidae
- Genus: Microcausta
- Species: M. ignifimbrialis

Binomial name
- Microcausta ignifimbrialis Hampson, 1895

= Microcausta ignifimbrialis =

Species of moth

Microcausta ignifimbrialis is a species of moth in the family Crambidae. It was first described by George Hampson in 1895. It is found on Saint Vincent in the Caribbean.
