= Roxita yunnanella =

Scientific classification
- Domain: Eukaryota
- Kingdom: Animalia
- Phylum: Arthropoda
- Class: Insecta
- Order: Lepidoptera
- Family: Crambidae
- Subfamily: Crambinae
- Tribe: incertae sedis
- Genus: Roxita
- Species: R. yunnanella

Binomial name
- Roxita yunnanella Sung & Chen in Chen, Sung & Yuan, 2002

Species of moth

Roxita yunnanella is a moth in the family Crambidae. It was described by Sung and Chen in 2002. It is found in China (Yunnan).
