= Miyakea lushanus =

Scientific classification
- Kingdom: Animalia
- Phylum: Arthropoda
- Class: Insecta
- Order: Lepidoptera
- Family: Crambidae
- Subfamily: Crambinae
- Tribe: Crambini
- Genus: Miyakea
- Species: M. lushanus

Binomial name
- Miyakea lushanus (Inoue, 1989)

Synonyms
- Euchromius lushanus Inoue, 1989

Species of moth

Miyakea lushanus is a moth in the family Crambidae. It was described by Hiroshi Inoue in 1989. It is found in Taiwan.
