= Roxita spinosa =

Scientific classification
- Domain: Eukaryota
- Kingdom: Animalia
- Phylum: Arthropoda
- Class: Insecta
- Order: Lepidoptera
- Family: Crambidae
- Subfamily: Crambinae
- Tribe: incertae sedis
- Genus: Roxita
- Species: R. spinosa

Binomial name
- Roxita spinosa W. Li, 2011

Species of moth

Roxita spinosa is a moth in the family Crambidae. It was described by W. Li in 2011. It is found in China (Hainan).
