= Myriostephes haplodes =

Scientific classification
- Domain: Eukaryota
- Kingdom: Animalia
- Phylum: Arthropoda
- Class: Insecta
- Order: Lepidoptera
- Family: Crambidae
- Genus: Myriostephes
- Species: M. haplodes

Binomial name
- Myriostephes haplodes (Meyrick, 1887)

Synonyms
- Diplopseustis haplodes Meyrick, 1887

Species of moth

Myriostephes haplodes is a moth in the family Crambidae. It was described by Edward Meyrick in 1887. It is found in Australia, where it has been recorded from Queensland.

The wingspan is about 23 mm. The forewings are greenish grey, irrorated (sprinkled) with white. There is a narrow white costal streak, margined beneath with fuscous reddish. The remaining lines are very obscure and white. There is a small fuscous dot beneath the costa at one-third and a transverse linear fuscous discal spot, as well as a white hindmarginal streak, terminated by a fuscous-reddish hindmarginal line. The hindwings have the same colour as the forewings.
