= Microcausta argenticilia =

Scientific classification
- Kingdom: Animalia
- Phylum: Arthropoda
- Class: Insecta
- Order: Lepidoptera
- Family: Crambidae
- Genus: Microcausta
- Species: M. argenticilia

Binomial name
- Microcausta argenticilia (Hampson, 1919)

Synonyms
- Diptychophora argenticilia Hampson, 1919

Species of moth

Microcausta argenticilia is a moth in the family Crambidae. It was described by George Hampson in 1919. It is found in Jamaica.
