= Metaeuchromius singulispinalis =

Scientific classification
- Domain: Eukaryota
- Kingdom: Animalia
- Phylum: Arthropoda
- Class: Insecta
- Order: Lepidoptera
- Family: Crambidae
- Subfamily: Crambinae
- Tribe: incertae sedis
- Genus: Metaeuchromius
- Species: M. singulispinalis

Binomial name
- Metaeuchromius singulispinalis W. Li & H. Li in Li, Li & Nuss, 2009

Species of moth

Metaeuchromius singulispinalis is a moth in the family Crambidae. It was described by W. Li and H. Li in 2009. It is found in China (Guizhou).
