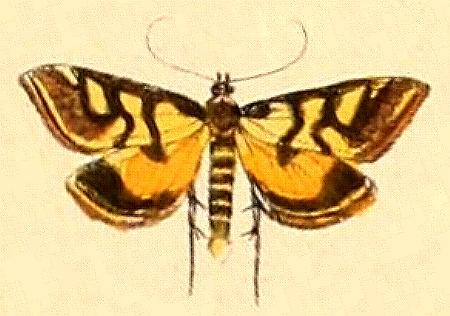

Scientific classification
- Domain: Eukaryota
- Kingdom: Animalia
- Phylum: Arthropoda
- Class: Insecta
- Order: Lepidoptera
- Family: Crambidae
- Genus: Metallarcha
- Species: M. beatalis

Binomial name
- Metallarcha beatalis (C. Felder, R. Felder & Rogenhofer, 1875)

Synonyms
- Botys beatalis C. Felder, R. Felder & Rogenhofer, 1875; Metallarcha clethrodes Lower, 1918; Metallarcha goudii Lower, 1902; Metallarcha thioscia Lower, 1918

= Metallarcha beatalis =

Species of moth

Metallarcha beatalis is a moth in the family Crambidae. It was described by Cajetan Felder, Rudolf Felder and Alois Friedrich Rogenhofer in 1875. It is found in Australia, where it has been recorded from Victoria, South Australia and Western Australia.
