= Mukhia =

Mukhia or Mukhiya may refer to:

- Mukhi, a title for the head of community in parts of India
- Sunuwar people (exonym: Mukhia), an ethnic group of Nepal
- Sunuwar language, a Sino-Tibetan language of Nepal

== People and fictional characters ==
- Harbans Mukhia (born 1939), Indian historian
- Brahmeshwar Singh (1947–2012), criminal and head of militia from Bihar, India
- Jitendra Mukhiya (born 1992), Nepalese cricketer
- Mukhiya, a recurring character in the Bahadur comics

== See also ==
- Mukhya Upanishads
- Mukia (disambiguation)
- Mukhyamantri (disambiguation)
