= Miyakea zhengi =

Scientific classification
- Domain: Eukaryota
- Kingdom: Animalia
- Phylum: Arthropoda
- Class: Insecta
- Order: Lepidoptera
- Family: Crambidae
- Subfamily: Crambinae
- Tribe: Crambini
- Genus: Miyakea
- Species: M. zhengi

Binomial name
- Miyakea zhengi W. Li & H. Li, 2007

Species of moth

Miyakea zhengi is a moth in the family Crambidae. It was described by W. Li and H. Li in 2007. It is found in (China (Tibet)) West Taiwan.

The length of the forewings is 16.5–18 mm.

== Etymology ==
The species is named in honor of Professor Zheng Zhe-Min, a Chinese entomologist.
