= Myriostephes asphycta =

Scientific classification
- Kingdom: Animalia
- Phylum: Arthropoda
- Clade: Pancrustacea
- Class: Insecta
- Order: Lepidoptera
- Family: Crambidae
- Genus: Myriostephes
- Species: M. asphycta

Binomial name
- Myriostephes asphycta (Turner, 1915)

Synonyms
- Metasia asphycta Turner, 1915

Species of moth

Myriostephes asphycta is a moth in the family Crambidae. It was described by Turner in 1915. It is found in Australia, where it has been recorded from the Northern Territory.

The wingspan is about 10 mm. The forewings are whitish suffused with brownish-ochreous and, on the costa and termen, with fuscous. The lines are fuscous. The hindwings are whitish with faint brownish-ochreous suffusion and an outwardly curved transverse line, as well as a broad pale fuscous terminal suffusion.
