= Mimorista leucoplacalis =

Scientific classification
- Kingdom: Animalia
- Phylum: Arthropoda
- Class: Insecta
- Order: Lepidoptera
- Family: Crambidae
- Genus: Mimorista
- Species: M. leucoplacalis

Binomial name
- Mimorista leucoplacalis (Hampson, 1918)

Synonyms
- Pyrausta leucoplacalis Hampson, 1918

Species of moth

Mimorista leucoplacalis is a moth in the family Crambidae. It was described by George Hampson in 1918. It is found in Colombia.
