= Archernis leucocosma =

Scientific classification
- Kingdom: Animalia
- Phylum: Arthropoda
- Clade: Pancrustacea
- Class: Insecta
- Order: Lepidoptera
- Family: Crambidae
- Subfamily: Spilomelinae
- Genus: Archernis
- Species: A. leucocosma

Binomial name
- Archernis leucocosma Turner, 1908

Synonyms
- Protonoceras leucocosma

Species of moth

Archernis leucocosma is a moth in the family Crambidae. It was described by Turner in 1908. It is found in Australia, where it has been recorded in Queensland.

The wingspan is about 22 mm. The forewings are greyish-brown with a fine fuscous transverse line and a snow-white median discal spot, edged anteriorly with fuscous. There is a fine fuscous wavy line from the costa to the dorsum, edged posteriorly with white in the costal portion. The hindwings are greyish-brown with a snow-white discal spot edged anteriorly with fuscous. There is also a fuscous postmedian line, edged posteriorly with white throughout.
