= Metacrambus marabut =

Scientific classification
- Kingdom: Animalia
- Phylum: Arthropoda
- Clade: Pancrustacea
- Class: Insecta
- Order: Lepidoptera
- Family: Crambidae
- Subfamily: Crambinae
- Tribe: Crambini
- Genus: Metacrambus
- Species: M. marabut

Binomial name
- Metacrambus marabut Bleszynski, 1965

Species of moth

Metacrambus marabut is a species of moth in the family Crambidae described by Stanisław Błeszyński in 1965. It is found on Sardinia and in Spain, as well as North Africa, including Morocco and Algeria.
