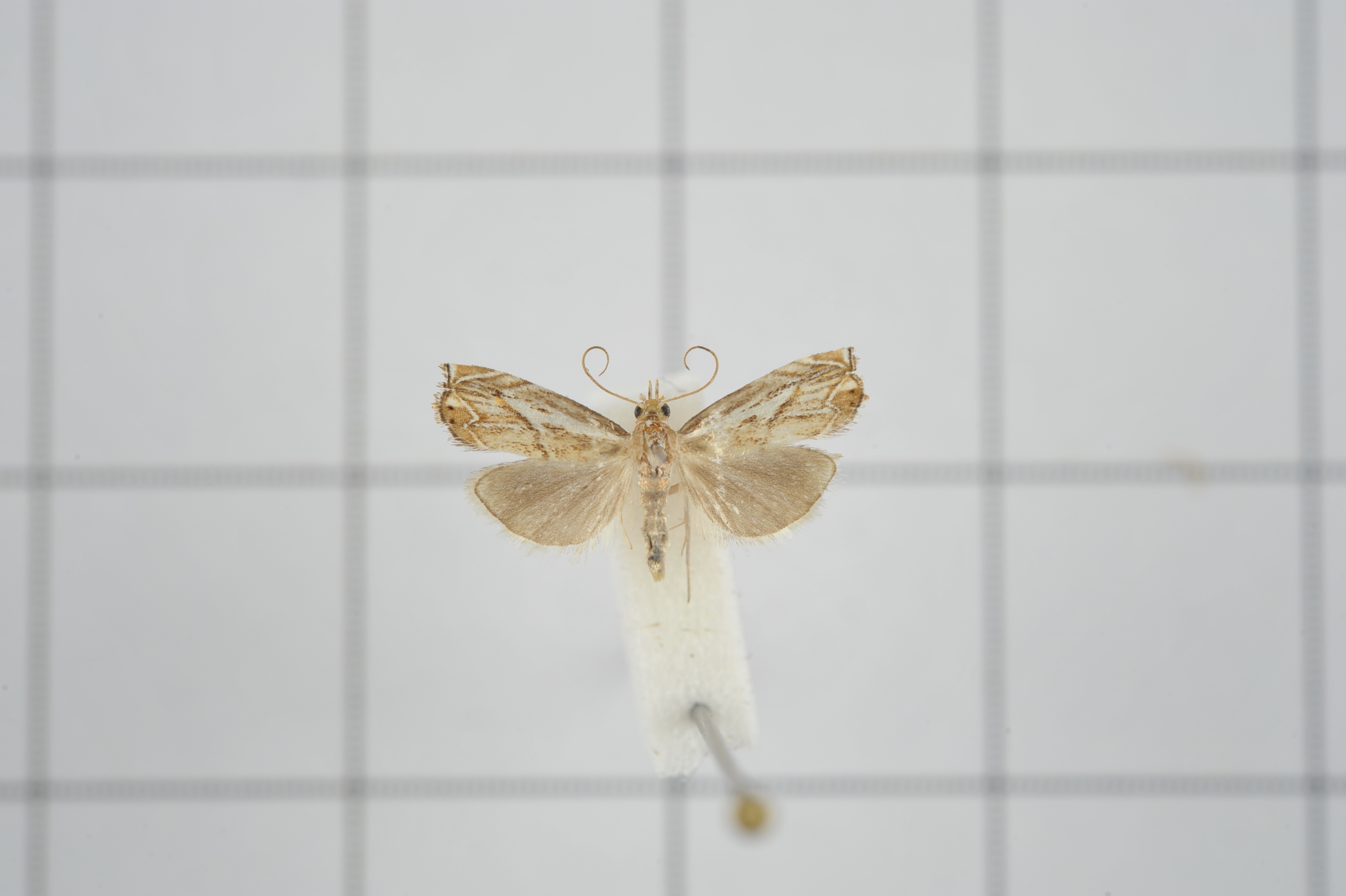

Scientific classification
- Domain: Eukaryota
- Kingdom: Animalia
- Phylum: Arthropoda
- Class: Insecta
- Order: Lepidoptera
- Family: Crambidae
- Subfamily: Crambinae
- Tribe: incertae sedis
- Genus: Roxita
- Species: R. bipunctella

Binomial name
- Roxita bipunctella (Wileman & South, 1917)

Synonyms
- Culladia bipunctella Wileman & South, 1917

= Roxita bipunctella =

Species of moth

Roxita bipunctella is a moth in the family Crambidae. It was described by Wileman and South in 1917. It is found in Taiwan.
