= Miyakea expansa =

Scientific classification
- Domain: Eukaryota
- Kingdom: Animalia
- Phylum: Arthropoda
- Class: Insecta
- Order: Lepidoptera
- Family: Crambidae
- Subfamily: Crambinae
- Tribe: Crambini
- Genus: Miyakea
- Species: M. expanse

Binomial name
- Miyakea expanse (Butler, 1881)

Synonyms
- Eromene expansa Butler, 1881

Species of moth

Miyakea expansa is a moth in the family Crambidae. It was described by Arthur Gardiner Butler in 1881. It is found in Japan and South Korea.

The wingspan is 11–13 mm.
