= Mukhyamantri =

Mukhyamantri or Mukhyamanthri are romanisations of the word for chief minister in several Indian languages. It may refer to:

- Mukhyamantri (film), a 1996 Indian Bengali-language film
- Mukhyamantri Chandru, an Indian actor and politician who worked in the Kannada film industry
- Mukhyamantri, a 2009 Indian Odia-language film starring Sidhant Mohapatra

== See also ==
- Mukhia (disambiguation)
- Mantri
