= Gargela albidusa =

Scientific classification
- Kingdom: Animalia
- Phylum: Arthropoda
- Clade: Pancrustacea
- Class: Insecta
- Order: Lepidoptera
- Family: Crambidae
- Subfamily: Crambinae
- Tribe: Diptychophorini
- Genus: Gargela
- Species: G. albidusa

Binomial name
- Gargela albidusa Song, Chen & Wu, 2009

Species of moth

Gargela albidusa is a moth in the family Crambidae. It was described by Shi-Mei Song, Fu-Qiang Chen and Chun-Sheng Wu in 2009. It is found in Shaanxi, China.
