= Mimorista matronulalis =

Scientific classification
- Kingdom: Animalia
- Phylum: Arthropoda
- Class: Insecta
- Order: Lepidoptera
- Family: Crambidae
- Genus: Mimorista
- Species: M. matronulalis

Binomial name
- Mimorista matronulalis (Möschler, 1886)

Synonyms
- Botys matronulalis Möschler, 1886

Species of moth

Mimorista matronulalis is a moth in the family Crambidae. It was described by Heinrich Benno Möschler in 1886. It is found in Jamaica.
