= Mimorista jamaicalis =

Scientific classification
- Kingdom: Animalia
- Phylum: Arthropoda
- Class: Insecta
- Order: Lepidoptera
- Family: Crambidae
- Genus: Mimorista
- Species: M. jamaicalis

Binomial name
- Mimorista jamaicalis (Haimbach, 1915)

Synonyms
- Pyrausta jamaicalis Haimbach, 1915; Pilocrocis cupreinitens Hampson, 1918

Species of moth

Mimorista jamaicalis is a moth in the family Crambidae. It was described by Frank Haimbach in 1915. It is found in Jamaica.
