= Archernis albicostalis =

Scientific classification
- Domain: Eukaryota
- Kingdom: Animalia
- Phylum: Arthropoda
- Class: Insecta
- Order: Lepidoptera
- Family: Crambidae
- Subfamily: Spilomelinae
- Genus: Archernis
- Species: A. albicostalis

Binomial name
- Archernis albicostalis Hampson, 1913

Species of moth

Archernis albicostalis is a moth in the family Crambidae. It was described by George Hampson in 1913. It is found on Borneo.

The forewings are pale brown, but the costal area is white to near the apex. There is a quadrate white spot in the end of the cell. The hindwings are pale brown, but the costal area is white to near the apex.
