= Munroeodes thalesalis =

Scientific classification
- Kingdom: Animalia
- Phylum: Arthropoda
- Class: Insecta
- Order: Lepidoptera
- Family: Crambidae
- Genus: Munroeodes
- Species: M. thalesalis

Binomial name
- Munroeodes thalesalis (Walker, 1859)

Synonyms
- Botys thalesalis Walker, 1859

Species of moth

Munroeodes thalesalis is a moth in the family Crambidae. It was described by Francis Walker in 1859. It is found in Honduras.
