= Microcausta flavipunctalis =

Scientific classification
- Kingdom: Animalia
- Phylum: Arthropoda
- Class: Insecta
- Order: Lepidoptera
- Family: Crambidae
- Genus: Microcausta
- Species: M. flavipunctalis

Binomial name
- Microcausta flavipunctalis Barnes & McDunnough, 1913

Species of moth

Microcausta flavipunctalis is a moth in the family Crambidae. It was described by William Barnes and James Halliday McDunnough in 1913. It is found in North America, where it has been recorded from Florida. It is also present in Cuba and Puerto Rico.

The wingspan is about 10 mm. Adults have been recorded on wing from December to May and October.
