= Roxita albipennata =

Scientific classification
- Kingdom: Animalia
- Phylum: Arthropoda
- Class: Insecta
- Order: Lepidoptera
- Family: Crambidae
- Subfamily: Crambinae
- Tribe: incertae sedis
- Genus: Roxita
- Species: R. albipennata

Binomial name
- Roxita albipennata Inoue, 1989

Species of moth

Roxita albipennata is a moth in the family Crambidae. It was described by Hiroshi Inoue in 1989. It is found in Japan.
