= Archernis flavidalis =

Scientific classification
- Domain: Eukaryota
- Kingdom: Animalia
- Phylum: Arthropoda
- Class: Insecta
- Order: Lepidoptera
- Family: Crambidae
- Subfamily: Spilomelinae
- Genus: Archernis
- Species: A. flavidalis

Binomial name
- Archernis flavidalis Hampson, 1908

Species of moth

Archernis flavidalis is a moth in the family Crambidae. It was described by George Hampson in 1908. It is found in South Africa and in Kenya.
