= Mimorista citrostictalis =

Scientific classification
- Kingdom: Animalia
- Phylum: Arthropoda
- Class: Insecta
- Order: Lepidoptera
- Family: Crambidae
- Genus: Mimorista
- Species: M. citrostictalis

Binomial name
- Mimorista citrostictalis (Hampson, 1913)

Synonyms
- Sameodes citrostictalis Hampson, 1913

Species of moth

Mimorista citrostictalis is a moth in the family Crambidae. It was described by George Hampson in 1913. It is found in Bolivia.
