= Microcausta cnemoptila =

Scientific classification
- Kingdom: Animalia
- Phylum: Arthropoda
- Class: Insecta
- Order: Lepidoptera
- Family: Crambidae
- Genus: Microcausta
- Species: M. cnemoptila

Binomial name
- Microcausta cnemoptila (Meyrick, 1931)

Synonyms
- Diptychophora cnemoptila Meyrick, 1931

Species of moth

Microcausta cnemoptila is a moth in the family Crambidae. It was described by Edward Meyrick in 1931. It is found in Guyana.
