= Metaeuchromius yusufeliensis =

Scientific classification
- Kingdom: Animalia
- Phylum: Arthropoda
- Clade: Pancrustacea
- Class: Insecta
- Order: Lepidoptera
- Family: Crambidae
- Genus: Metaeuchromius
- Species: M. yusufeliensis

Binomial name
- Metaeuchromius yusufeliensis Nuss & Speidel, 1999

Species of moth

Metaeuchromius yusufeliensis is a moth in the family Crambidae. It was described by Matthias Nuss and Wolfgang Speidel in 1999. It is found in Turkey.
