= Mimorista tristigmalis =

Scientific classification
- Kingdom: Animalia
- Phylum: Arthropoda
- Class: Insecta
- Order: Lepidoptera
- Family: Crambidae
- Genus: Mimorista
- Species: M. tristigmalis

Binomial name
- Mimorista tristigmalis (Hampson, 1899)

Synonyms
- Pilocrocis tristigmalis Hampson, 1899; Psara extremalis Schaus, 1920

Species of moth

Mimorista tristigmalis is a moth in the family Crambidae. It was described by George Hampson in 1899. It is found in Cuba and the United States, where it has been recorded from Florida.

The wingspan is 25-28 mm. The forewings are ochreous white with black markings. The hindwings are white, irrorated with pale yellow brown scales. Adults are on wing from January to April, in July and from November to December in Florida.
