= Munroeodes delavalis =

Scientific classification
- Domain: Eukaryota
- Kingdom: Animalia
- Phylum: Arthropoda
- Class: Insecta
- Order: Lepidoptera
- Family: Crambidae
- Genus: Munroeodes
- Species: M. delavalis

Binomial name
- Munroeodes delavalis (Möschler, 1881)

Synonyms
- Botis delavalis Möschler, 1881; Munroeodes guianae Munroe, 1964

Species of moth

Munroeodes delavalis is a moth in the family Crambidae. It was described by Heinrich Benno Möschler in 1881. It is found in Suriname and French Guiana.
