= Mimorista trisemalis =

Scientific classification
- Kingdom: Animalia
- Phylum: Arthropoda
- Class: Insecta
- Order: Lepidoptera
- Family: Crambidae
- Genus: Mimorista
- Species: M. trisemalis

Binomial name
- Mimorista trisemalis (Dognin, 1910)

Synonyms
- Sameodes trisemalis Dognin, 1910

Species of moth

Mimorista trisemalis is a moth in the family Crambidae, found in Bolivia. It was described by Paul Dognin in 1910.
