= Gargela cuprealis =

Scientific classification
- Kingdom: Animalia
- Phylum: Arthropoda
- Clade: Pancrustacea
- Class: Insecta
- Order: Lepidoptera
- Family: Crambidae
- Subfamily: Crambinae
- Tribe: Diptychophorini
- Genus: Gargela
- Species: G. cuprealis

Binomial name
- Gargela cuprealis Hampson, 1906

Species of moth

Gargela cuprealis is a moth in the family Crambidae. It was described by George Hampson in 1906. It is found on Borneo.
