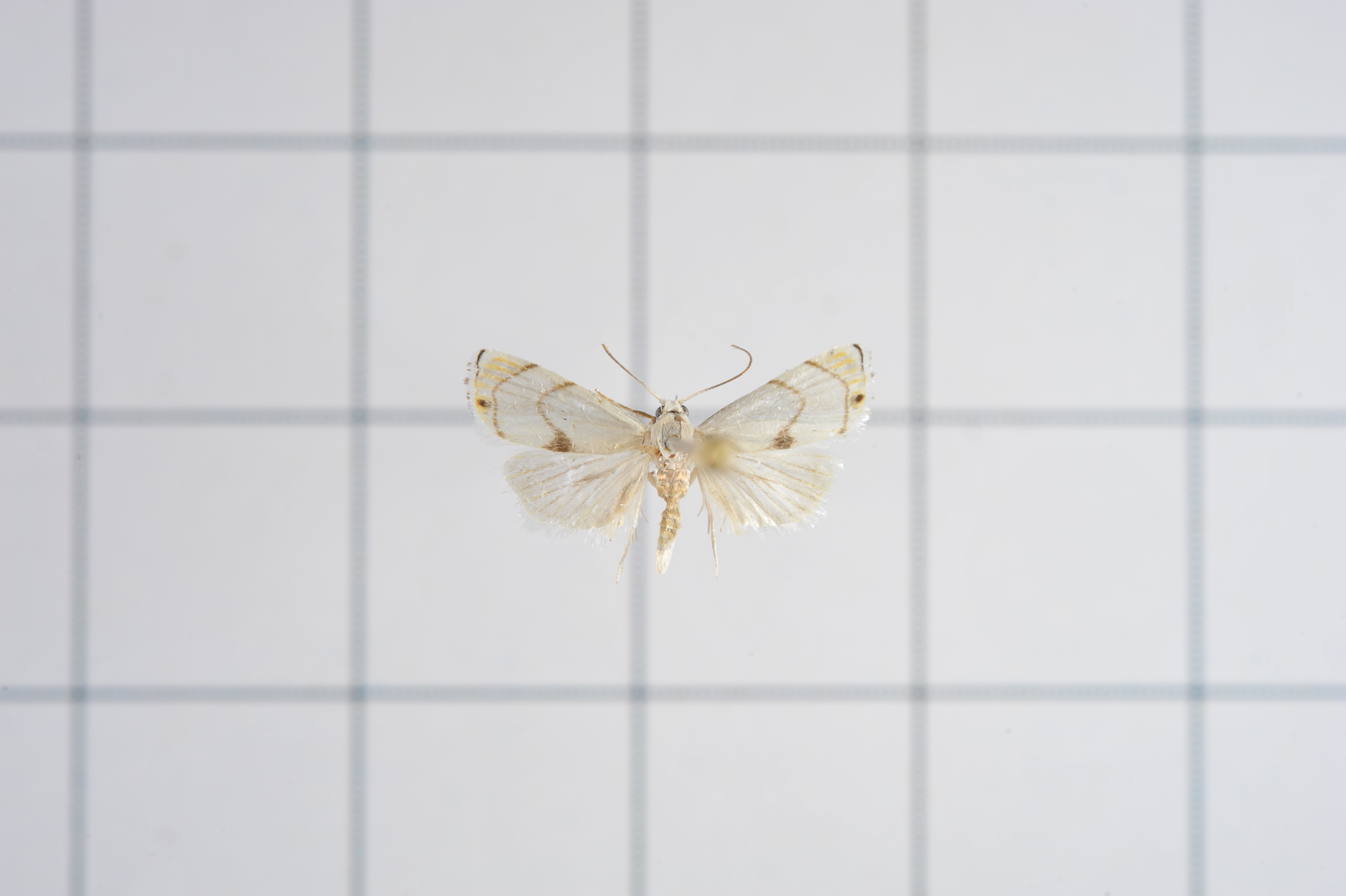

Scientific classification
- Kingdom: Animalia
- Phylum: Arthropoda
- Clade: Pancrustacea
- Class: Insecta
- Order: Lepidoptera
- Family: Crambidae
- Subfamily: Crambinae
- Tribe: Diptychophorini
- Genus: Gargela
- Species: G. renatusalis

Binomial name
- Gargela renatusalis (Walker, 1859)

Synonyms
- Zebronia renatusalis Walker, 1859; Angonia crambidalis Snellen, 1893; Crambus ermineus Moore, 1886

= Gargela renatusalis =

Species of moth

Gargela renatusalis is a moth in the family Crambidae. It was described by Francis Walker in 1859. It is found on Borneo, Java, Sri Lanka and Taiwan.
