= Gargela trilinealis =

Scientific classification
- Kingdom: Animalia
- Phylum: Arthropoda
- Clade: Pancrustacea
- Class: Insecta
- Order: Lepidoptera
- Family: Crambidae
- Subfamily: Crambinae
- Tribe: Diptychophorini
- Genus: Gargela
- Species: G. trilinealis

Binomial name
- Gargela trilinealis (Hampson, 1897)

Synonyms
- Mixophyla trilinealis Hampson, 1897

Species of moth

Gargela trilinealis is a moth in the family Crambidae. It was described by George Hampson in 1897. It is found on Fergusson Island in Papua New Guinea.
