= Mesocrambus =

Scientific classification
- Domain: Eukaryota
- Kingdom: Animalia
- Phylum: Arthropoda
- Class: Insecta
- Order: Lepidoptera
- Family: Crambidae
- Subfamily: Crambinae
- Tribe: Crambini
- Genus: Mesocrambus; Bleszynski, 1957

Genus of moths

Mesocrambus is a genus of moths of the family Crambidae.

== Species ==
- Mesocrambus canariensis Ganev, 1987
- Mesocrambus candiellus (Herrich-Schäffer, 1849)
- Mesocrambus tamsi Bleszynski, 1960
