= Merodictya =

Scientific classification
- Kingdom: Animalia
- Phylum: Arthropoda
- Class: Insecta
- Order: Lepidoptera
- Family: Crambidae
- Subfamily: Spilomelinae
- Genus: Merodictya; Warren, 1896
- Species: M. marmorata

Binomial name
- Merodictya marmorata (T. P. Lucas, 1892)

Synonyms
- Nausinoe marmorata T. P. Lucas, 1892; Merodictya subtessellalis Warren, 1896

Genus of moths

Merodictya is a monotypic moth genus of the family Crambidae described by William Warren in 1896. It contains only one species, Merodictya marmorata, described by Thomas Pennington Lucas in 1892, which is found in Australia, where it has been recorded from Queensland and New South Wales.

Adults are blotchy brown with a scattering of white spots on the wings.
