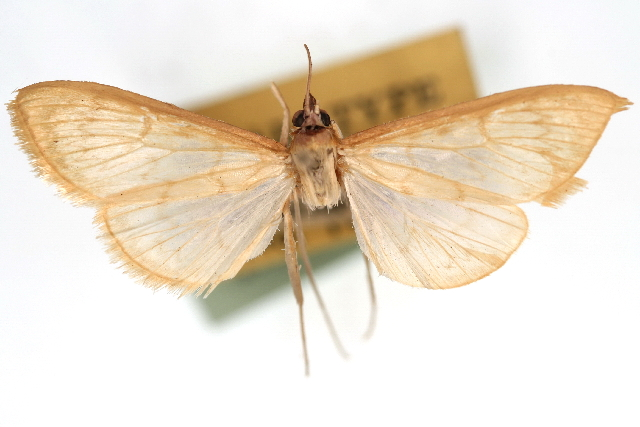
- Specimen of Munroeodes australis

Scientific classification
- Domain: Eukaryota
- Kingdom: Animalia
- Phylum: Arthropoda
- Class: Insecta
- Order: Lepidoptera
- Family: Crambidae
- Subfamily: Pyraustinae
- Genus: Munroeodes; Amsel, 1957

Synonyms
- Munroeia Amsel, 1956 (non Marion, 1954: preoccupied)

= Munroeodes =

Genus of moths

Munroeodes is a genus of moths of the family Crambidae.

== Species ==
- Munroeodes australis Munroe, 1964
- Munroeodes delavalis (Möschler, 1881)
- Munroeodes thalesalis (Walker, 1859)
- Munroeodes transparentalis Amsel, 1956
