= Roxita =

Scientific classification
- Domain: Eukaryota
- Kingdom: Animalia
- Phylum: Arthropoda
- Class: Insecta
- Order: Lepidoptera
- Family: Crambidae
- Subfamily: Crambinae
- Tribe: incertae sedis
- Genus: Roxita; Bleszynski, 1963

Synonyms
- Modestia Bleszynski, 1965

Genus of moths

Roxita is a genus of moths of the family Crambidae.

== Species ==
- Roxita acutispinata W. Li & H. Li, 2009
- Roxita adspersella (Snellen, 1893)
- Roxita albipennata Inoue, 1989
- Roxita apicella Gaskin, 1984
- Roxita bipunctella (Wileman & South, 1917)
- Roxita capacunca W. Li & H. Li, 2009
- Roxita eurydyce Bleszynski, 1963
- Roxita fletcheri Gaskin, 1984
- Roxita fujianella Sung & Chen in Chen, Sung & Yuan, 2002
- Roxita mululella Gaskin, 1984
- Roxita reductella Gaskin, 1984
- Roxita spinosa W. Li, 2011
- Roxita szetschwanella (Caradja, 1931)
- Roxita yunnanella Sung & Chen in Chen, Sung & Yuan, 2002
