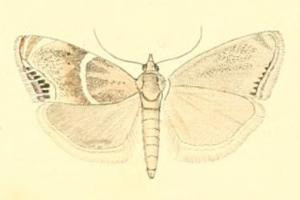
- Metaeuchromius lata

Scientific classification
- Domain: Eukaryota
- Kingdom: Animalia
- Phylum: Arthropoda
- Class: Insecta
- Order: Lepidoptera
- Family: Crambidae
- Subfamily: Crambinae
- Tribe: incertae sedis
- Genus: Metaeuchromius; Bleszynski, 1960

Synonyms
- Pseudeuchromius Bleszynski, 1965

= Metaeuchromius =

Genus of moths

Metaeuchromius is a genus of moths of the family Crambidae.

== Species ==
- Metaeuchromius anacanthus W. Li & H. Li in Li, Li & Nuss, 2009
- Metaeuchromius changensis Schouten, 1997
- Metaeuchromius circe Bleszynski, 1965
- Metaeuchromius euzonella (Hampson, 1896)
- Metaeuchromius flavofascialis Park, 1990
- Metaeuchromius fulvusalis Song & Chen in Chen, Song & Yuan, 2002
- Metaeuchromius glacialis Li, 2015
- Metaeuchromius grisalis Song & Chen in Chen, Song & Yuan, 2002
- Metaeuchromius inflatus Schouten, 1997
- Metaeuchromius kimurai Sasaki, 2005
- Metaeuchromius lata (Staudinger, 1870)
- Metaeuchromius latoides Schouten, 1997
- Metaeuchromius singulispinalis W. Li & H. Li in Li, Li & Nuss, 2009
- Metaeuchromius yuennanensis (Caradja in Caradja & Meyrick, 1937)
- Metaeuchromius yusufeliensis Nuss & Speidel, 1999
