= Miyakea =

Scientific classification
- Domain: Eukaryota
- Kingdom: Animalia
- Phylum: Arthropoda
- Class: Insecta
- Order: Lepidoptera
- Family: Crambidae
- Subfamily: Crambinae
- Tribe: Crambini
- Genus: Miyakea; Marumo, 1933

Genus of moths

Miyakea is a genus of moths of the family Crambidae.

== Species ==
- Miyakea consimilis Sasaki, 2012
- Miyakea expansa (Butler, 1881)
- Miyakea lushanus (Inoue, 1989)
- Miyakea raddeella (Caradja, 1910)
- Miyakea sinevi Schouten, 1992
- Miyakea ussurica Ustjuzhanin & Schouten, 1995
- Miyakea zhengi W. Li & H. Li, 2007
