= Mimophobetron =

Scientific classification
- Kingdom: Animalia
- Phylum: Arthropoda
- Class: Insecta
- Order: Lepidoptera
- Family: Crambidae
- Subfamily: Spilomelinae
- Genus: Mimophobetron; Munroe, 1950
- Species: M. pyropsalis

Binomial name
- Mimophobetron pyropsalis (Hampson, 1904)

Synonyms
- Pyrausta pyropsalis Hampson, 1904; Pyrausta liopasialis Dyar, 1914; Pyrausta rhodope Hampson, 1913; Pyrausta rhodope ab. rhodopides Strand, 1917

Genus of moths

Mimophobetron is a monotypic moth genus of the family Crambidae described by Eugene G. Munroe in 1950. It contains only one species, Mimophobetron pyropsalis, described by George Hampson in 1904, which is found in Central America (Panama, Costa Rica, Mexico, Honduras), the Bahamas and Florida.
