= Metasiodes =

Scientific classification
- Domain: Eukaryota
- Kingdom: Animalia
- Phylum: Arthropoda
- Class: Insecta
- Order: Lepidoptera
- Family: Crambidae
- Subfamily: Pyraustinae
- Genus: Metasiodes; Meyrick, 1894

Genus of moths

Metasiodes is a genus of moths of the family Crambidae.

== Species ==
- Metasiodes achromatias Meyrick, 1894
- Metasiodes calliophis Meyrick, 1894
- Metasiodes heliaula Meyrick, 1894
- Metasiodes tholeropa Meyrick, 1894
