= Macrobela =

Scientific classification
- Domain: Eukaryota
- Kingdom: Animalia
- Phylum: Arthropoda
- Class: Insecta
- Order: Lepidoptera
- Family: Crambidae
- Subfamily: Spilomelinae
- Genus: Macrobela; Turner, 1939
- Species: M. phaeophasma

Binomial name
- Macrobela phaeophasma Turner, 1939

Synonyms
- Asopia phaeophasma

Genus of moths

Macrobela is a monotypic moth genus of the family Crambidae described by Alfred Jefferis Turner in 1939. It contains only one species, Macrobela phaeophasma, described by the same author in the same year, which is found in Australia, where it has been recorded from Queensland.
