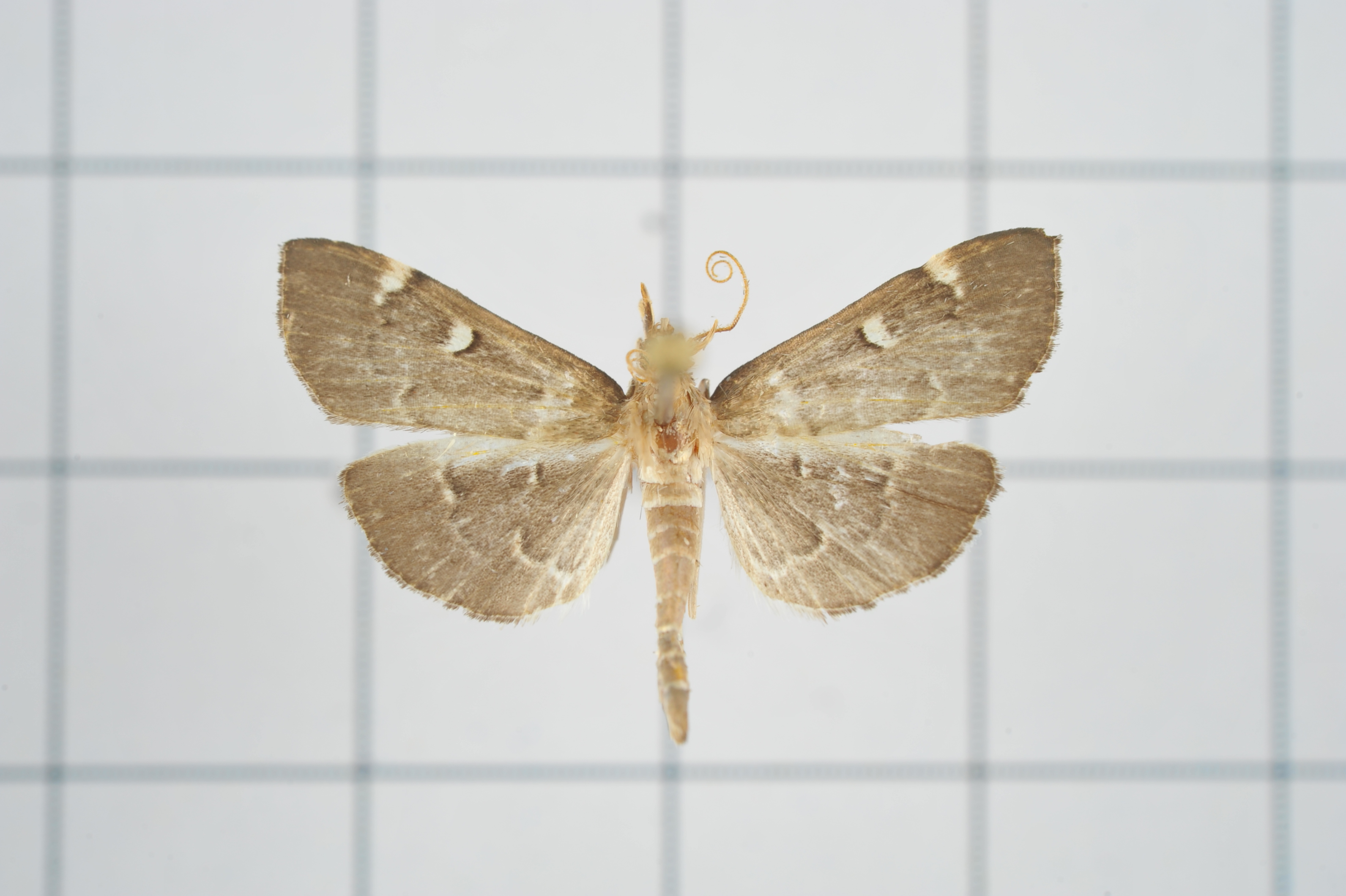
- Archernis capitalis

Scientific classification
- Kingdom: Animalia
- Phylum: Arthropoda
- Class: Insecta
- Order: Lepidoptera
- Family: Crambidae
- Subfamily: Spilomelinae
- Genus: Archernis; Meyrick, 1886

Type species
- Archernis callixantha Meyrick, 1886

Synonyms
- Chrysommatodes Warren, 1896; Metoportha Meyrick, 1894; Protonoceras Warren, 1890

= Archernis =

Genus of moths

Archernis is a genus of moths of the family Crambidae.

== Species ==
- Archernis albicostalis Hampson, 1913
- Archernis argocephala Lower, 1903
- Archernis callixantha Meyrick, 1886
- Archernis capitalis (Fabricius, 1794)
- Archernis dolopsalis (Walker, 1859)
- Archernis eucosma Turner, 1908
- Archernis flavidalis Hampson, 1908
- Archernis fulvalis Hampson, 1913
- Archernis fulvalis Hampson, 1899
- Archernis humilis (Swinhoe, 1894)
- Archernis leucocosma Turner, 1908
- Archernis lugens (Warren, 1896)
- Archernis mitis Turner, 1937
- Archernis nictitans (Swinhoe, 1894)
- Archernis obliquialis Hampson, 1896
- Archernis scopulalis (Walker, 1865)
