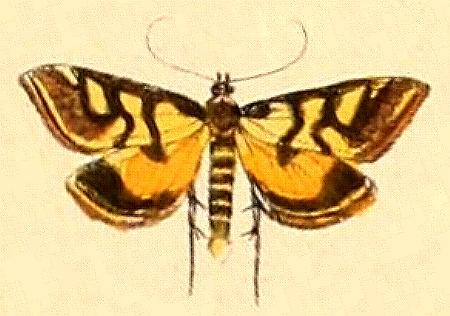
- Metallarcha beatalis

Scientific classification
- Domain: Eukaryota
- Kingdom: Animalia
- Phylum: Arthropoda
- Class: Insecta
- Order: Lepidoptera
- Family: Crambidae
- Genus: Metallarcha; Meyrick, 1884

Synonyms
- Panopsia Turner, 1913

= Metallarcha =

Genus of moths

Metallarcha is a genus of moths of the family Crambidae.

== Species ==
- Metallarcha achoeusalis (Walker, 1859)
- Metallarcha aureodiscalis (Hampson, 1918)
- Metallarcha beatalis (C. Felder, R. Felder & Rogenhofer, 1875)
- Metallarcha calliaspis Meyrick, 1884
- Metallarcha chrysitis Turner, 1941
- Metallarcha crocanthes Lower, 1896
- Metallarcha diplochrysa Meyrick, 1884
- Metallarcha epichrysa Meyrick, 1884
- Metallarcha erromena (Turner, 1908)
- Metallarcha eurychrysa Meyrick, 1884
- Metallarcha leucodetis (Lower, 1899)
- Metallarcha phaenolis Turner, 1913
- Metallarcha pseliota Meyrick, 1887
- Metallarcha tetraplaca Meyrick, 1887
- Metallarcha thiophara Turner, 1917
- Metallarcha zygosema Lower, 1897
