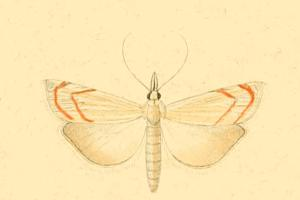
- Metacrambus pallidellus

Scientific classification
- Kingdom: Animalia
- Phylum: Arthropoda
- Clade: Pancrustacea
- Class: Insecta
- Order: Lepidoptera
- Family: Crambidae
- Subfamily: Crambinae
- Tribe: Crambini
- Genus: Metacrambus; Bleszynski, 1957

= Metacrambus =

Genus of moths

Metacrambus is a genus of moths of the family Crambidae.

== Species ==
- Metacrambus carectellus (Zeller, 1847)
- Metacrambus deprinsi Ganev, 1990
- Metacrambus jugaraicae Bleszynski, 1965
- Metacrambus kurdistanellus (Amsel, 1959)
- Metacrambus marabut Bleszynski, 1965
- Metacrambus pallidellus (Duponchel, 1836)
- Metacrambus salahinellus (Chrétien, 1917)
