= Mesopediasia =

Scientific classification
- Domain: Eukaryota
- Kingdom: Animalia
- Phylum: Arthropoda
- Class: Insecta
- Order: Lepidoptera
- Family: Crambidae
- Tribe: Crambini
- Genus: Mesopediasia; Bleszynski, 1963

Genus of moths

Mesopediasia is a genus of moths of the family Crambidae.

== Species ==
- Mesopediasia hemixanthellus (Hampson, 1896)
- Mesopediasia psyche Bleszynski, 1963
