= Malaciotis =

Scientific classification
- Kingdom: Animalia
- Phylum: Arthropoda
- Class: Insecta
- Order: Lepidoptera
- Family: Crambidae
- Subfamily: Spilomelinae
- Genus: Malaciotis; Meyrick, 1934
- Species: M. thiogramma

Binomial name
- Malaciotis thiogramma Meyrick, 1934

Genus of moths

Malaciotis is a monotypic moth genus of the family Crambidae described by Edward Meyrick in 1934. It contains only one species, Malaciotis thiogramma, described by the same author in the same year, which is found in Katanga Province of the Democratic Republic of the Congo.
