= Myriostephes =

Scientific classification
- Domain: Eukaryota
- Kingdom: Animalia
- Phylum: Arthropoda
- Class: Insecta
- Order: Lepidoptera
- Family: Crambidae
- Subfamily: Spilomelinae
- Genus: Myriostephes; Meyrick, 1884

Genus of moths

Myriostephes is a genus of moths of the family Crambidae. The genus was erected by Edward Meyrick in 1884.

== Species ==
- Myriostephes asphycta (Turner, 1915)
- Myriostephes crocobapta Turner, 1908
- Myriostephes haplodes (Meyrick, 1887)
- Myriostephes leucostictalis (Hampson, 1899)
- Myriostephes matura Meyrick, 1884
- Myriostephes rubriceps (Hampson, 1903)
