= Mesocrambus tamsi =

Scientific classification
- Kingdom: Animalia
- Phylum: Arthropoda
- Clade: Pancrustacea
- Class: Insecta
- Order: Lepidoptera
- Family: Crambidae
- Genus: Mesocrambus
- Species: M. tamsi

Binomial name
- Mesocrambus tamsi Błeszyński, 1960

Species of moth

Mesocrambus tamsi is a species of moth in the family Crambidae described by Stanisław Błeszyński in 1960. It is found on Sardinia and in North Africa (including Morocco and Algeria) and Syria.
