= Meekiaria =

Scientific classification
- Domain: Eukaryota
- Kingdom: Animalia
- Phylum: Arthropoda
- Class: Insecta
- Order: Lepidoptera
- Family: Crambidae
- Subfamily: Spilomelinae
- Genus: Meekiaria; Munroe, 1974
- Species: M. lignea

Binomial name
- Meekiaria lignea Munroe, 1974

Genus of moths

Meekiaria is a monotypic moth genus of the family Crambidae described by Eugene G. Munroe in 1974. It contains only one species, Meekiaria lignea, described by the same author in the same year, which is found in New Guinea.
