= Microcausta =

Scientific classification
- Kingdom: Animalia
- Phylum: Arthropoda
- Class: Insecta
- Order: Lepidoptera
- Family: Crambidae
- Tribe: Diptychophorini
- Genus: Microcausta; Hampson, 1895

Genus of moths

Microcausta is a genus of moths of the family Crambidae.

== Species ==
- Microcausta argenticilia (Hampson, 1919)
- Microcausta bipunctalis Barnes & McDunnough, 1914
- Microcausta cnemoptila (Meyrick, 1931)
- Microcausta flavipunctalis Barnes & McDunnough, 1913
- Microcausta ignifimbrialis Hampson, 1895
