= Myrmidonistis =

Scientific classification
- Domain: Eukaryota
- Kingdom: Animalia
- Phylum: Arthropoda
- Class: Insecta
- Order: Lepidoptera
- Family: Crambidae
- Subfamily: Spilomelinae
- Genus: Myrmidonistis; Meyrick, 1887
- Species: M. hoplora

Binomial name
- Myrmidonistis hoplora Meyrick, 1887

Genus of moths

Myrmidonistis is a monotypic moth genus of the family Crambidae described by Edward Meyrick in 1887. It contains only one species, Myrmidonistis hoplora, described in the same article, which is found in Australia, where it has been recorded from Queensland.

The wingspan is about 23 mm. The forewings are greenish grey, irrorated (sprinkled) with white. There is a white costal streak, margined beneath with fuscous reddish. The remaining lines are very obscure, narrow and white. The hindwings have the same colour and mostly the same markings as the forewings.
