= Gargela =

Scientific classification
- Kingdom: Animalia
- Phylum: Arthropoda
- Clade: Pancrustacea
- Class: Insecta
- Order: Lepidoptera
- Family: Crambidae
- Subfamily: Crambinae
- Tribe: Diptychophorini
- Genus: Gargela; Walker, 1864

Synonyms
- Mixophyla Meyrick, 1887; Angonia Snellen, 1893; Mixophila Hampson, 1896

Genus of moths

Gargela is a genus of moths in the subfamily Crambinae of the family Crambidae. The genus currently comprises 22 Austral-Asian species, of which the majority has been described in recent years. Many species remain to be described, with their total number probably being around 40 species.

== Species ==
- Gargela albidusa Song, Chen & Wu, 2009
- Gargela apicalis (Pagenstecher, 1900)
- Gargela arcualis Hampson, 1906
- Gargela bilineata Song, Chen & Wu, 2009
- Gargela chrysias (Meyrick, 1897)
- Gargela cuprealis Hampson, 1906
- Gargela distigma Song, Chen & Wu, 2009
- Gargela furca Song, Chen & Wu, 2009
- Gargela fuscusa Song, Chen & Wu, 2009
- Gargela grandispinata Li in Yang, Jie & Li, 2019
- Gargela hainana Song, Chen & Wu, 2009
- Gargela hastatela Song, Chen & Wu, 2009
- Gargela minuta Song, Chen & Wu, 2009
- Gargela niphostola Hampson, 1917
- Gargela obliquivitta Hampson, 1917
- Gargela polyacantha Li in Yang, Jie & Li, 2019
- Gargela quadrispinula Song, Chen & Wu, 2009
- Gargela renatusalis (Walker, 1859)
- Gargela subpurella (Walker, 1864)
- Gargela trilinealis (Hampson, 1897)
- Gargela xanthocasis (Meyrick, 1897)
- Gargela xizangensis Song, Chen & Wu, 2009
