= Mesocondyla =

Scientific classification
- Kingdom: Animalia
- Phylum: Arthropoda
- Clade: Pancrustacea
- Class: Insecta
- Order: Lepidoptera
- Family: Crambidae
- Subfamily: Spilomelinae
- Genus: Mesocondyla; Lederer, 1863

Genus of moths

Mesocondyla is a genus of moths of the family Crambidae described by Julius Lederer in 1863.

== Species ==
- Mesocondyla dardusalis (Walker, 1859)
- Mesocondyla tarsibarbalis Hampson, 1899
