= Metallarcha eurychrysa =

Scientific classification
- Kingdom: Animalia
- Phylum: Arthropoda
- Class: Insecta
- Order: Lepidoptera
- Family: Crambidae
- Genus: Metallarcha
- Species: M. eurychrysa

Binomial name
- Metallarcha eurychrysa Meyrick, 1884

Species of moth

Metallarcha eurychrysa is a moth in the family Crambidae. It was described by Edward Meyrick in 1884. It is found in Australia, where it has been recorded from South Australia, New South Wales and Western Australia.
