= Metraeopsis =

Scientific classification
- Kingdom: Animalia
- Phylum: Arthropoda
- Class: Insecta
- Order: Lepidoptera
- Family: Crambidae
- Subfamily: Spilomelinae
- Genus: Metraeopsis; Dognin, 1905
- Species: M. cuneatalis

Binomial name
- Metraeopsis cuneatalis Dognin, 1905

Synonyms
- Metracopsis Neave, 1940

Genus of moths

Metraeopsis is a monotypic moth genus of the family Crambidae described by Paul Dognin in 1905. It contains only one species, Metraeopsis cuneatalis, described in the same article, which is found in Loja Province, Ecuador.
