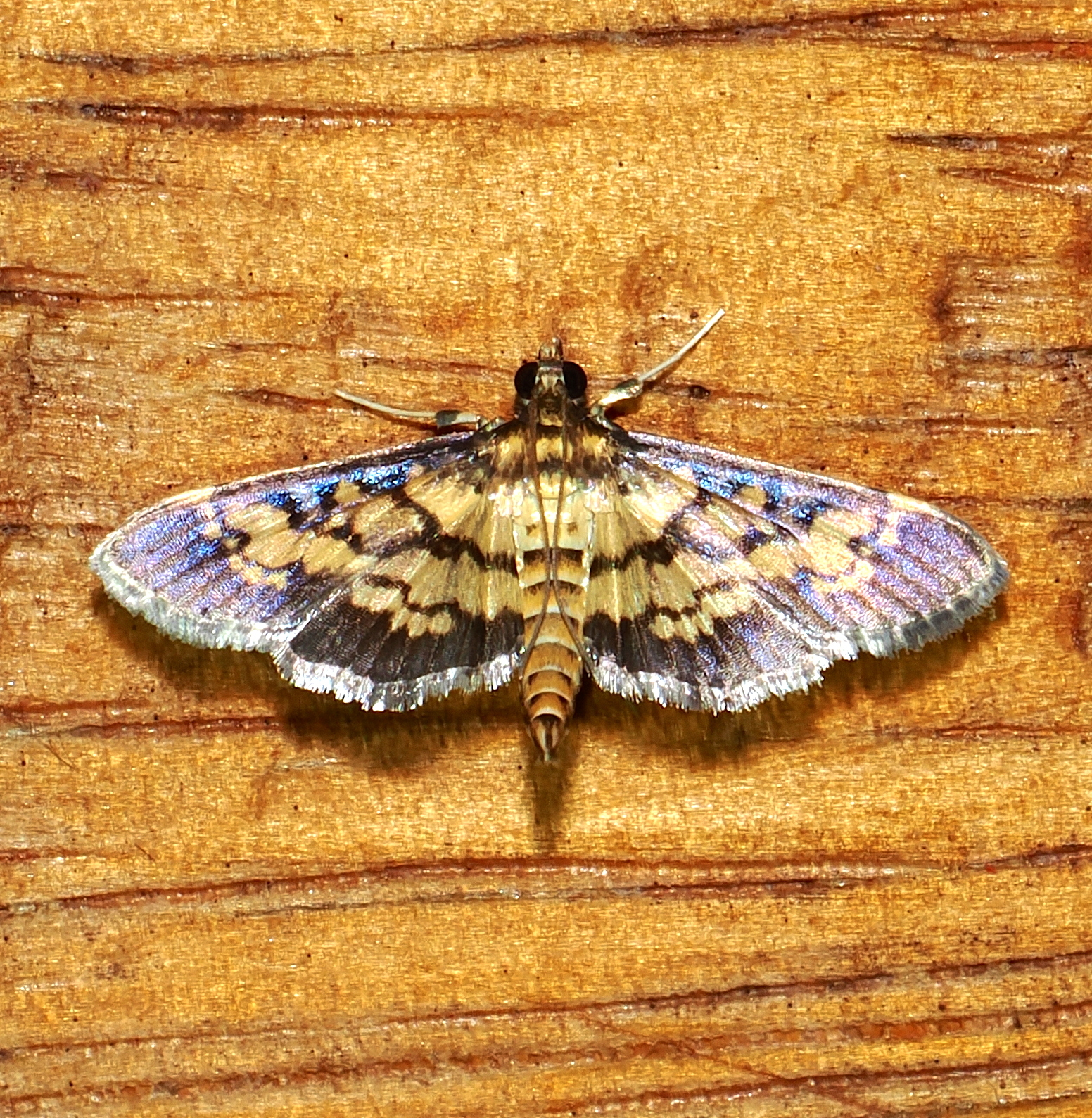
- Mimorista botydalis

Scientific classification
- Kingdom: Animalia
- Phylum: Arthropoda
- Class: Insecta
- Order: Lepidoptera
- Family: Crambidae
- Subfamily: Spilomelinae
- Genus: Mimorista; Warren, 1890

= Mimorista =

Genus of moths

Mimorista is a genus of moths of the family Crambidae described by William Warren in 1890.

== Species ==
- Mimorista botydalis (Guenée, 1854)
- Mimorista brunneoflavalis (Hampson, 1913)
- Mimorista citronalis (Hampson, 1913)
- Mimorista citrostictalis (Hampson, 1913)
- Mimorista costistictalis (Hampson, 1918)
- Mimorista diopalis (Hampson, 1913)
- Mimorista jamaicalis (Haimbach, 1915)
- Mimorista leucoplacalis (Hampson, 1918)
- Mimorista marginalis Warren, 1896
- Mimorista matronulalis (Möschler, 1886)
- Mimorista subcostalis (Hampson, 1913)
- Mimorista trimaculalis (Grote, 1878)
- Mimorista trisemalis (Dognin, 1910)
- Mimorista tristigmalis (Hampson, 1899)
- Mimorista villicalis (Möschler, 1886)
