= Archernis fulvalis =

Scientific classification
- Domain: Eukaryota
- Kingdom: Animalia
- Phylum: Arthropoda
- Class: Insecta
- Order: Lepidoptera
- Family: Crambidae
- Subfamily: Spilomelinae
- Genus: Archernis
- Species: A. fulvalis

Binomial name
- Archernis fulvalis Hampson, 1899

Species of moth

Archernis fulvalis is a moth in the family Crambidae. It was described by George Hampson in 1899. It is found in India (Sikkim) and Sri Lanka.
