= Mukia (moth) =

Scientific classification
- Domain: Eukaryota
- Kingdom: Animalia
- Phylum: Arthropoda
- Class: Insecta
- Order: Lepidoptera
- Family: Crambidae
- Subfamily: Spilomelinae
- Genus: Mukia; Amsel, 1954
- Species: M. nigroanalis

Binomial name
- Mukia nigroanalis Amsel, 1954

Genus of moths

Mukia is a monotypic moth genus of the family Crambidae described by Hans Georg Amsel in 1954. It contains only one species, Mukia nigroanalis, described in the same article, which is found in Iran.
