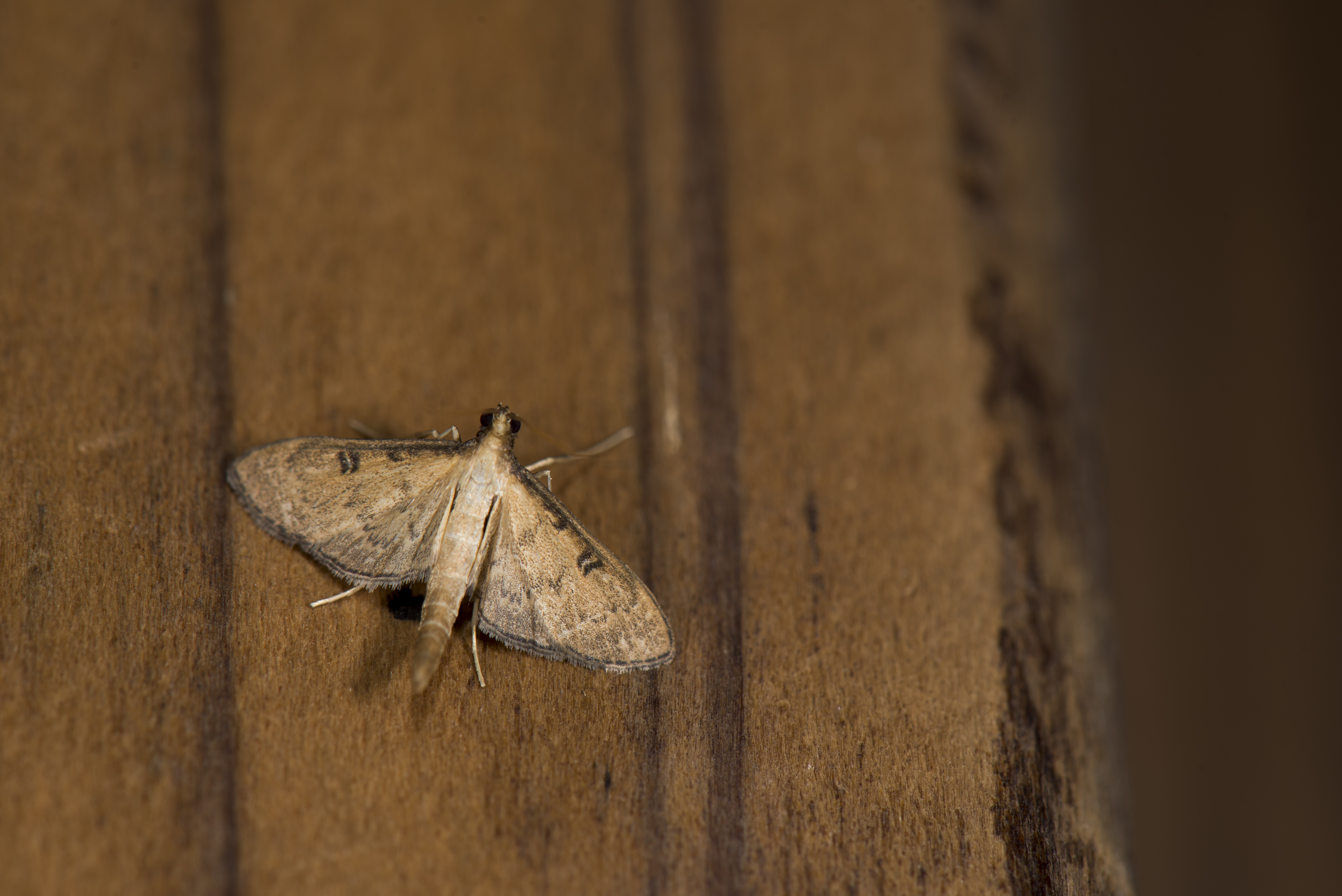
- Tatobotys depalpalis, adult male

Scientific classification
- Kingdom: Animalia
- Phylum: Arthropoda
- Clade: Pancrustacea
- Class: Insecta
- Order: Lepidoptera
- Family: Crambidae
- Subfamily: Spilomelinae
- Tribe: Steniini; Guenée, 1854

= Steniini =

Tribe of moths

Steniini is a tribe of the species-rich subfamily Spilomelinae in the pyraloid moth family Crambidae. The group was first proposed by Achille Guenée in 1854 as "Steniadae", and later used as name for the Spilomelinae tribe containing its type genus Stenia (a synonym of Dolicharthria).

== Description ==
Adult Steniini are characterised by long legs, and males typically have a slender, long abdomen. In the male genitalia, the uncus with its bifid chaetae is single or bicapitate (in Loxostegopsis and Tatobotys) or entirely split (in Metasia). The costa of the valva is concave or straight, in some taxa weakly convex. The valva itself is simple and usually lacks a fibula or exhibits a single fibula originating from base of valva; in the Duponchelia group, two or three small fibulae are present at the base of the valva. The fibula and the dorsodistal sacculus or its extension are non-overlapping. The phallus has a caecum. In the female genitalia, a signum is generally absent except in Bradina and Perisyntrocha, where it forms a toothed arc. The ostium and ductus bursae lack any other sclerotization; the absence of sclerotisations in the corpus bursae is considered a synapomorphy of Steniini. In the Duponchelia group, the forewing has vein Rs1 stalked with Rs2+3. A recurrent character in several but not all species of this group is the fovea in the male forewing at the distal end of the discal cell. In the male genitalia the dorsal vinculum exhibits a pair of elongate hairpencils. The ductus bursae in the female genitalia is very short. In the caterpillars, the mesothoracic SD2 seta is fine and hairlike.

== Food plants ==
Steniini caterpillars generally appear to feed on detritus. In Southeast Asia, the larvae of the Duponchelia group are detritivores in marshes and intertidal environments of mangrove swamps. They are often associated with the Avicennia zone of mangrove forests, which is inundated at high tides.

Particular food records are known for only a few species:

- Dolicharthria punctalis feeds on wilting leaves of different plants.
- Duponchelia fovealis is considered an invasive pest; it feeds on a wide range of host plants.
- Hymenoptychis sordida caterpillars spin silk galleries among algae and litter in the intertidal zone of mangroves and generally feed on green algae, decomposing litter, wet rotted timber, and Avicennia fruits.
- Metasia corsicalis feeds on detritus.
- Nacoleia charesalis feeds on rotting leaves and bores in turmeric stems.
- Nacoleia octasema consumes inflorescences of bananas.
- Tatobotys janapalis larvae are detritiphagous on decaying leaves of many mangrove species, and thrive under very poor conditions.
- Tatobotys biannulalis larvae are scavengers in debris at the base of rice and probably other grasses.

== Distribution ==
The genera Anageshna, Apogeshna, Loxostegopsis, Penestola and Steniodes are confined to the Americas, whereas Bradina, Dichocrocis and Dolicharthria can be found in both the Old and New World. The remaining genera are Old World taxa, with Epherema, Hymenoptychis, Symmoracma and Tatobotys primarily found in the tropics of Asia.

== Systematics ==
The tribe currently comprises the following 15 genera, altogether containing 256 species:

- Anageshna Munroe, 1956
- Apogeshna Munroe, 1956 (synonym Euvalva Amsel, 1956)
- Bradina Lederer, 1863 (synonyms Erilita Lederer, 1863, Pleonectusa Lederer, 1863, Trematarcha Meyrick, 1886)
- Camptomastix Warren, 1892
- Dichocrocis Lederer, 1863 (synonym Zebrodes Warren, 1896; misspellings Dichocroscis Swinhoe & Cotes, 1889, Dichocrosis Janse, 1917)
- Dolicharthria Stephens, 1834 (synonyms Amaurophanes Lederer, 1863 Leptarchis Meyrick, 1937, Parastenia Hartig, 1940, Epistenia Chrétien, 1911, Stenia Duponchel, 1845; misspelling Dolycharthria Stephens, 1850)
- Duponchelia Zeller, 1847
- Epherema Snellen, 1892
- Glycythyma Turner, 1908
- Hymenoptychis Zeller, 1852 (synonym Syrbatis Walker, 1863)
- Loxostegopsis Dyar, 1917 (misspelling Loxotegopsis Dyar, 1917)
- Metasia Guenée, 1854 (synonyms Clasperia Hartig, 1952, Hystrixia Hartig, 1952)
- Penestola Möschler, 1890
- Pseudambia D. J. L. Agassiz, 2025
- Steniodes Snellen, 1875 (synonyms Heringiella Berg, 1898, Heringia Hedemann, 1894, Scaeocerandra Meyrick, 1936)
- Symmoracma Meyrick, 1894
- Tatobotys Butler, 1881 (synonym Cometura Meyrick, 1886)
