= Decticogaster =

Scientific classification
- Kingdom: Animalia
- Phylum: Arthropoda
- Class: Insecta
- Order: Lepidoptera
- Family: Crambidae
- Subfamily: Acentropinae
- Genus: Decticogaster; Snellen, 1880
- Species: D. zonulalis

Binomial name
- Decticogaster zonulalis Snellen, (1879) 1880

Genus of moths

Decticogaster is a genus of moths of the family Crambidae. It contains only one species, Decticogaster zonulalis, which is found on Sulawesi.

The Global Lepidoptera Names Index considers the genus to be a synonym of Tatobotys and the species to be a synonym of Tatobotys varanesalis.
