= Steniodes declivalis =

Scientific classification
- Kingdom: Animalia
- Phylum: Arthropoda
- Class: Insecta
- Order: Lepidoptera
- Family: Crambidae
- Genus: Steniodes
- Species: S. declivalis

Binomial name
- Steniodes declivalis (Dyar, 1914)

Synonyms
- Stenia declivalis Dyar, 1914

Species of moth

Steniodes declivalis is a moth in the family Crambidae. It was described by Harrison Gray Dyar Jr. in 1914. It is found in Panama, Costa Rica and Venezuela.

The wingspan is about 13 mm. Adults are similar to Steniodes gelliasalis, but are smaller, darker and the whitish outer line of the hindwings is distinct, sharply angled and touches the outer margin.
