= Dolicharthria psologramma =

Scientific classification
- Kingdom: Animalia
- Phylum: Arthropoda
- Class: Insecta
- Order: Lepidoptera
- Family: Crambidae
- Genus: Dolicharthria
- Species: D. psologramma

Binomial name
- Dolicharthria psologramma (Meyrick, 1937)

Synonyms
- Leptarchis psologramma Meyrick, 1937

Species of moth

Dolicharthria psologramma is a moth in the family Crambidae. It was described by Edward Meyrick in 1937. It is found in Iraq.
