= Dolicharthria grisealis =

Scientific classification
- Kingdom: Animalia
- Phylum: Arthropoda
- Class: Insecta
- Order: Lepidoptera
- Family: Crambidae
- Genus: Dolicharthria
- Species: D. grisealis

Binomial name
- Dolicharthria grisealis (Hampson, 1899)

Synonyms
- Stenia grisealis Hampson, 1899

Species of moth

Dolicharthria grisealis is a moth in the family Crambidae. It was described by George Hampson in 1899. It is found on Socotra in Yemen.
