= Loxostegopsis xanthocrypta =

Scientific classification
- Kingdom: Animalia
- Phylum: Arthropoda
- Class: Insecta
- Order: Lepidoptera
- Family: Crambidae
- Genus: Loxostegopsis
- Species: L. xanthocrypta

Binomial name
- Loxostegopsis xanthocrypta (Dyar, 1913)

Synonyms
- Pyrausta xanthocrypta Dyar, 1913

Species of moth

Loxostegopsis xanthocrypta is a moth in the family Crambidae. It is found in Mexico, California, Florida, Nevada and Texas.

The wingspan is 17–18 mm. The forewings are dark grey with dark lines with whitish edges. The hindwings are fuscous with a dark line. Adults are on wing in March, from May to July and in September.
