= Steniodes suspensa =

Scientific classification
- Kingdom: Animalia
- Phylum: Arthropoda
- Class: Insecta
- Order: Lepidoptera
- Family: Crambidae
- Genus: Steniodes
- Species: S. suspensa

Binomial name
- Steniodes suspensa (Meyrick, 1936)

Synonyms
- Scaeocerandra suspensa Meyrick, 1936

Species of moth

Steniodes suspensa is a moth in the family Crambidae. It was described by Edward Meyrick in 1936. It is found in Venezuela.
