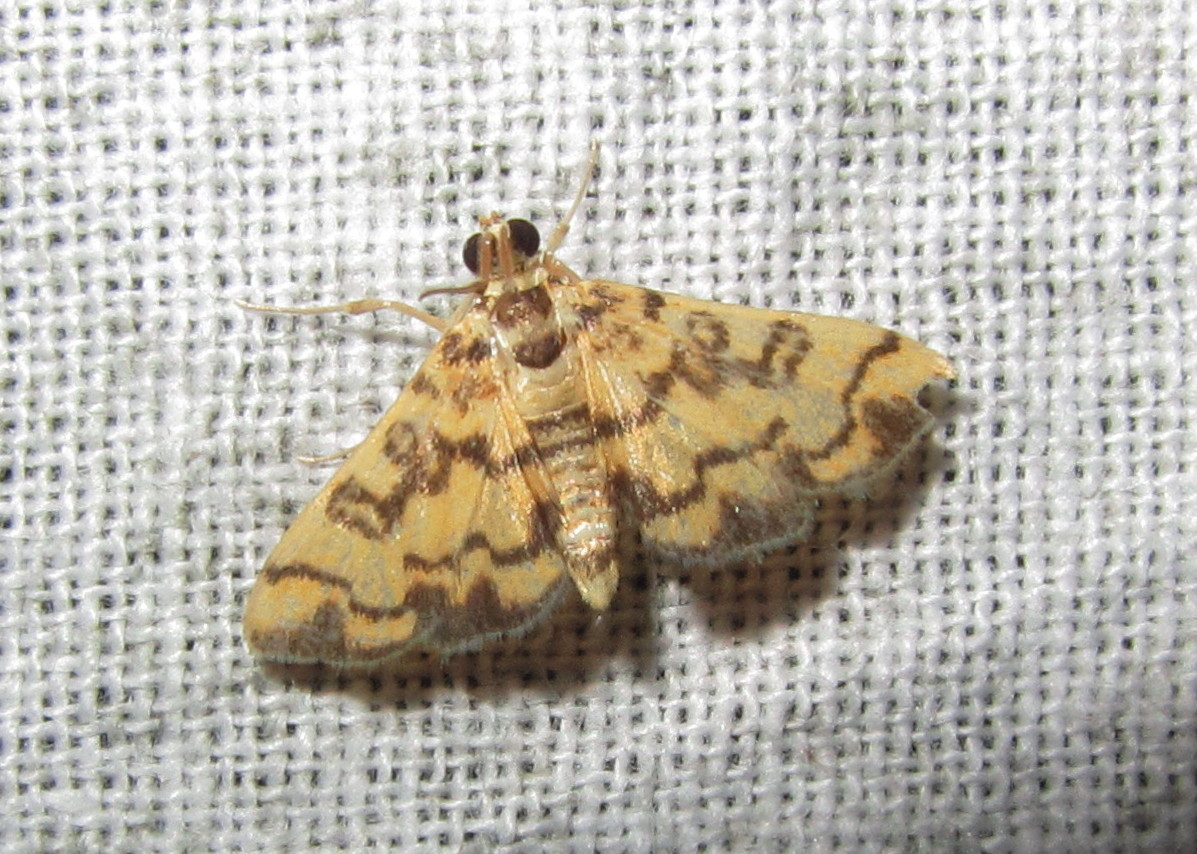

Scientific classification
- Kingdom: Animalia
- Phylum: Arthropoda
- Clade: Pancrustacea
- Class: Insecta
- Order: Lepidoptera
- Family: Crambidae
- Genus: Glycythyma
- Species: G. chrysorycta

Binomial name
- Glycythyma chrysorycta (Meyrick, 1884)

Synonyms
- Semioceros chrysorycta Meyrick, 1884; Nacoleia chrysorycta; Nacoleia contingens Moore, 1885

= Glycythyma chrysorycta =

Species of moth

Glycythyma chrysorycta is a moth in the family Crambidae. It was described by Edward Meyrick in 1884. It is found in India, Sri Lanka, Myanmar, Japan, Korea, China, Taiwan and Australia, where it has been recorded from Queensland.

The wingspan is about 17 mm. Adults are yellow with wiggly brown lines across the wings. Adults are on wing from June to July.
