= Dolicharthria stigmosalis =

Scientific classification
- Kingdom: Animalia
- Phylum: Arthropoda
- Clade: Pancrustacea
- Class: Insecta
- Order: Lepidoptera
- Family: Crambidae
- Genus: Dolicharthria
- Species: D. stigmosalis

Binomial name
- Dolicharthria stigmosalis (Herrich-Schaffer, 1848)

Synonyms
- Stenia stigmosalis Herrich-Schaffer, 1848; Amaurophanes stigmosalis

Species of moth

Dolicharthria stigmosalis is a species of moth in the family Crambidae. It is found in France, Austria, Hungary, Croatia, Greece, North Macedonia, Bulgaria, Romania, Ukraine and Turkey.
