= Dolicharthria carbonalis =

Scientific classification
- Kingdom: Animalia
- Phylum: Arthropoda
- Class: Insecta
- Order: Lepidoptera
- Family: Crambidae
- Genus: Dolicharthria
- Species: D. carbonalis

Binomial name
- Dolicharthria carbonalis (Warren, 1896)

Synonyms
- Stenia carbonalis Warren, 1896; Massepha carbonalis

Species of moth

Dolicharthria carbonalis is a moth in the family Crambidae. It was described by Warren in 1896. It is found in India (Assam).
