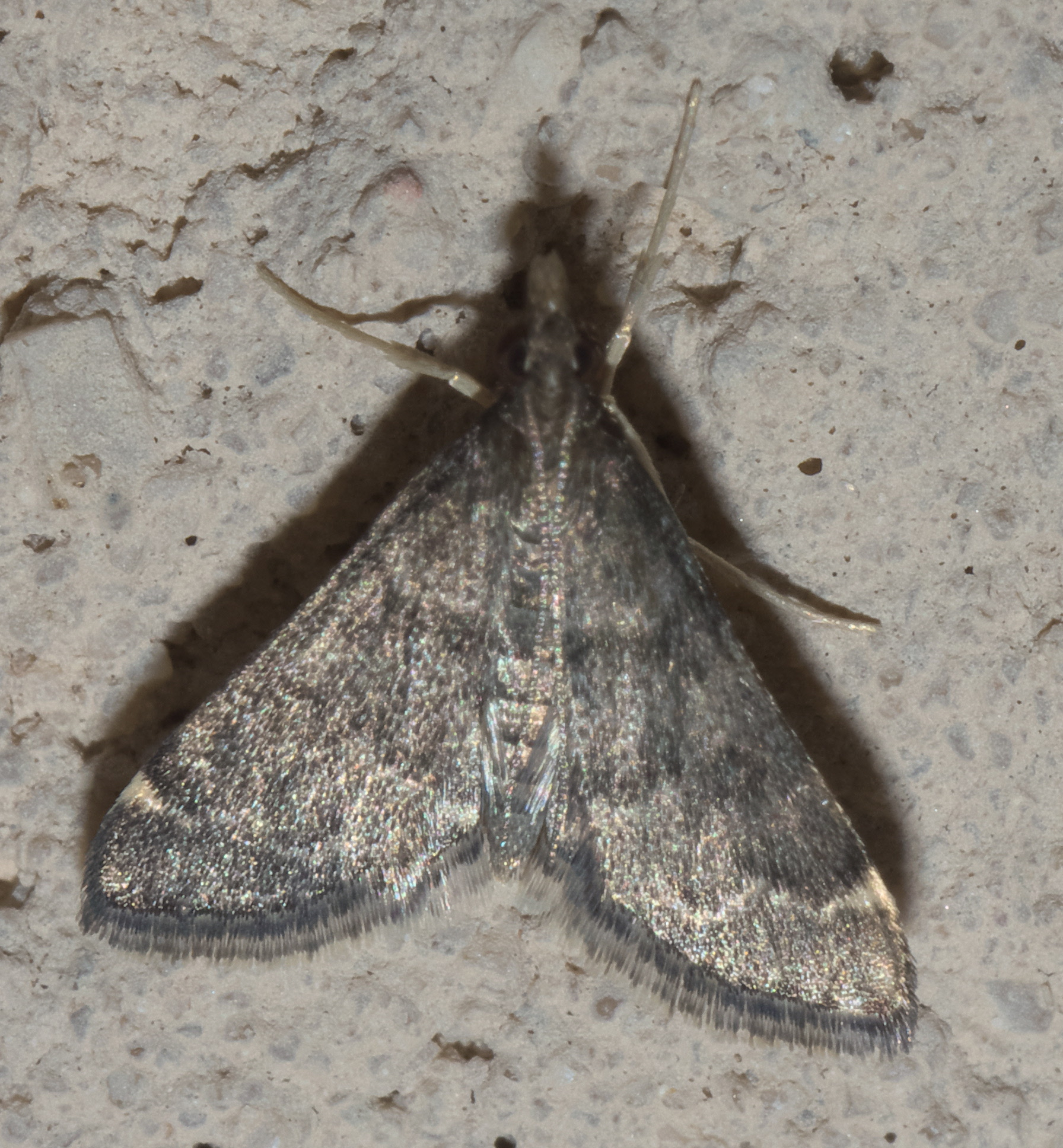
- Loxostegopsis merrickalis

Scientific classification
- Kingdom: Animalia
- Phylum: Arthropoda
- Class: Insecta
- Order: Lepidoptera
- Family: Crambidae
- Genus: Loxostegopsis
- Species: L. merrickalis

Binomial name
- Loxostegopsis merrickalis (Barnes & McDunnough, 1918)

Synonyms
- Pyrausta merrickalis Barnes & McDunnough, 1918

= Loxostegopsis merrickalis =

Species of moth

Loxostegopsis merrickalis, or Merrick's pyralid moth, is a moth in the family Crambidae. It was described by William Barnes and James Halliday McDunnough in 1918. It is found in North America, where it has been recorded from Alabama, California, Florida, Georgia, Illinois, Indiana, Kansas, Maine, Manitoba, Maryland, Massachusetts, Minnesota, New Hampshire, North Carolina, North Dakota, Ohio, Ontario, Pennsylvania, Quebec, South Carolina, Texas, West Virginia and Wisconsin.
