= Dolicharthria mabillealis =

Scientific classification
- Kingdom: Animalia
- Phylum: Arthropoda
- Clade: Pancrustacea
- Class: Insecta
- Order: Lepidoptera
- Family: Crambidae
- Genus: Dolicharthria
- Species: D. mabillealis

Binomial name
- Dolicharthria mabillealis (Viette, 1953)

Synonyms
- Stenia mabillealis Viette, 1953

Species of moth

Dolicharthria mabillealis is a moth in the family Crambidae. It was described by Viette in 1953. It is found in Madagascar.
