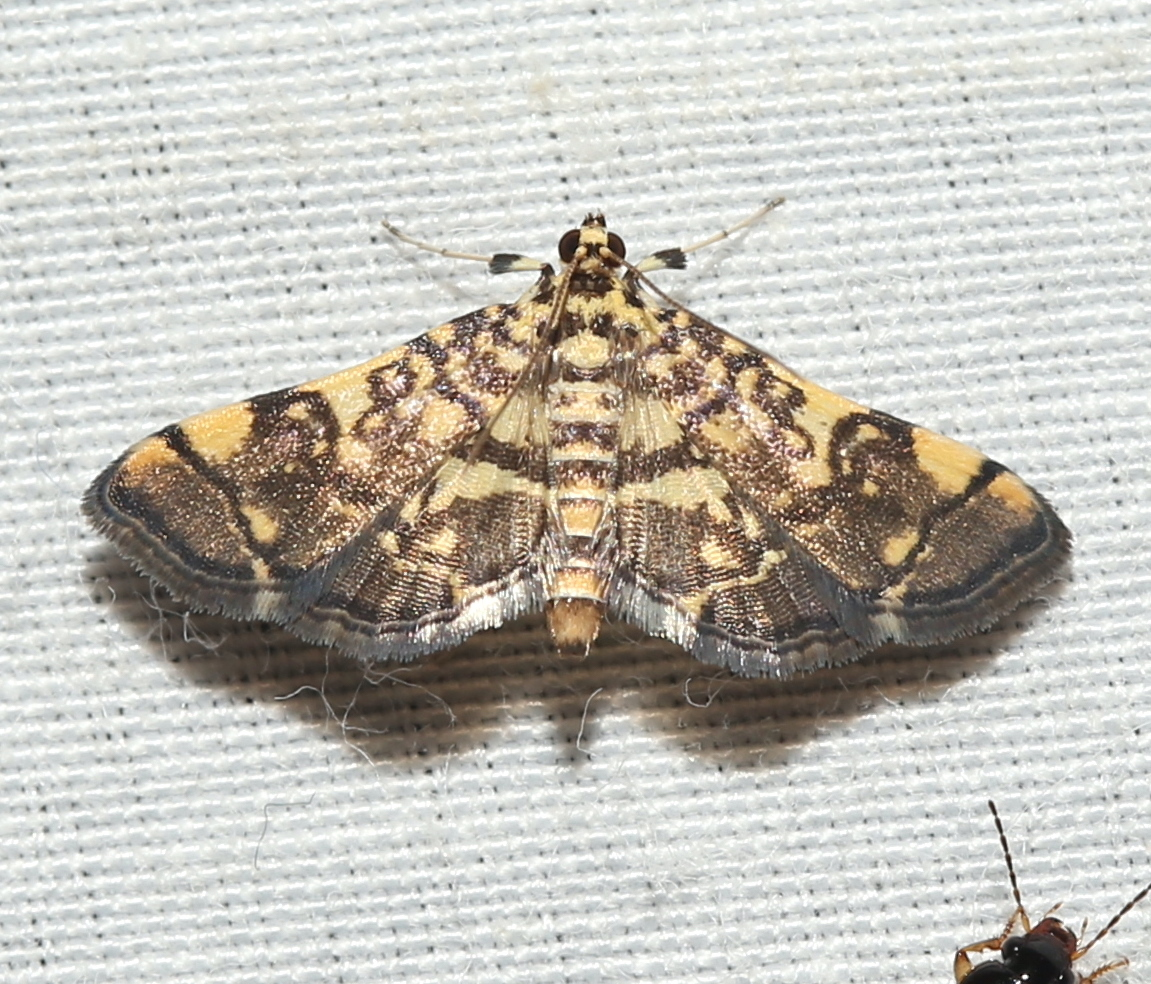

Scientific classification
- Kingdom: Animalia
- Phylum: Arthropoda
- Class: Insecta
- Order: Lepidoptera
- Family: Crambidae
- Genus: Apogeshna
- Species: A. stenialis

Binomial name
- Apogeshna stenialis (Guenée, 1854)

Synonyms
- Isopteryx stenialis Guenée, 1854; Hydrocampa australis Hulst, 1886; Samea acestealis Walker, 1859; Asopia phaerusalis Walker, 1859; Blepharomastix sagralis Druce, 1895

= Apogeshna stenialis =

Species of moth

Apogeshna stenialis, the checkered apogeshna moth, is a moth in the family Crambidae. It is found from Maine to Florida, west to Alabama, Illinois and Ohio. It is also found in Mexico (Veracruz, Tabasco), Panama, Honduras, and the Dominican Republic.

The wingspan is about 17 mm. Adults are on wing in spring and summer.
