= Steniodes mendica =

Scientific classification
- Kingdom: Animalia
- Phylum: Arthropoda
- Class: Insecta
- Order: Lepidoptera
- Family: Crambidae
- Genus: Steniodes
- Species: S. mendica

Binomial name
- Steniodes mendica (Hedemann, 1894)

Synonyms
- Heringia mendica Hedemann, 1894; Stenia ceddalis Schaus, 1924; Stenia declivalis var. indianalis Dyar, 1914

Species of moth

Steniodes mendica is a moth in the family Crambidae. It was described by W. von Hedemann in 1894. It is found in Cuba, Jamaica, Puerto Rico, the Virgin Islands and Grenada, Costa Rica, Honduras, Mexico and the United States, where it has been recorded from Florida to Texas.

The wingspan is 12–13 mm. Adults are on wing year round.
