= Tatobotys tanyscia =

Scientific classification
- Kingdom: Animalia
- Phylum: Arthropoda
- Class: Insecta
- Order: Lepidoptera
- Family: Crambidae
- Genus: Tatobotys
- Species: T. tanyscia

Binomial name
- Tatobotys tanyscia West, 1931

Species of moth

Tatobotys tanyscia is a moth in the family Crambidae. It was described by West in 1931. It is found in the Philippines (Palawan).
