= Apogeshna infirmalis =

Scientific classification
- Kingdom: Animalia
- Phylum: Arthropoda
- Class: Insecta
- Order: Lepidoptera
- Family: Crambidae
- Genus: Apogeshna
- Species: A. infirmalis

Binomial name
- Apogeshna infirmalis (Möschler, 1886)

Synonyms
- Parapoynx infirmalis Möschler, 1886; Nymphula infimalis

Species of moth

Apogeshna infirmalis is a moth in the family Crambidae. It was described by Heinrich Benno Möschler in 1886. It is found in Jamaica and Puerto Rico.
