= Glycythyma xanthoscota =

Scientific classification
- Kingdom: Animalia
- Phylum: Arthropoda
- Clade: Pancrustacea
- Class: Insecta
- Order: Lepidoptera
- Family: Crambidae
- Genus: Glycythyma
- Species: G. xanthoscota

Binomial name
- Glycythyma xanthoscota (Lower, 1903)

Synonyms
- Nacoleia xanthoscota Lower, 1903

Species of moth

Glycythyma xanthoscota is a moth in the family Crambidae. It was described by Oswald Bertram Lower in 1903. It is found in Australia, where it has been recorded from Queensland.
