= Tatobotys aurantialis =

Scientific classification
- Kingdom: Animalia
- Phylum: Arthropoda
- Class: Insecta
- Order: Lepidoptera
- Family: Crambidae
- Genus: Tatobotys
- Species: T. aurantialis

Binomial name
- Tatobotys aurantialis Hampson, 1897

Species of moth

Tatobotys aurantialis is a moth in the family Crambidae. It was described by George Hampson in 1897. It is found in the Kyushu and Ryukyu Islands of Japan, Taiwan, Bacan Islands of Indonesia and on the Solomon Islands.

The wingspan is about 16 mm. Adults are orange, the forewings with some black markings at the base. The antemedial line is conjoined to a quadrate patch below the cell and there is a large discocellular mark connected with the costa by a semicircular mark and with the inner margin by a line. The postmedial line is angled outwards on vein 6 and sharply dentate inwards on vein 5, then excurved and conjoined to the dark marginal area, which is broad at the costa, narrowing to near the margin at vein 2, then expanding again. The hindwings have a sinuous ante- and postmedial line, the latter conjoined towards the inner margin to the dark marginal area, which is broad towards the costa, narrows at vein 2, then expands again.
