= Steniodes acuminalis =

Scientific classification
- Kingdom: Animalia
- Phylum: Arthropoda
- Class: Insecta
- Order: Lepidoptera
- Family: Crambidae
- Genus: Steniodes
- Species: S. acuminalis

Binomial name
- Steniodes acuminalis (Dyar, 1914)

Synonyms
- Stenia acuminalis Dyar, 1914

Species of moth

Steniodes acuminalis is a moth in the family Crambidae. It was described by Harrison Gray Dyar Jr. in 1914. It is found in Panama and Costa Rica.

The wingspan is about 14 mm. The forewings are shaded with brownish black with a slight ochreous tinge. The lines are whitish and edged with black. The hindwings are black, but whitish on the costa.
