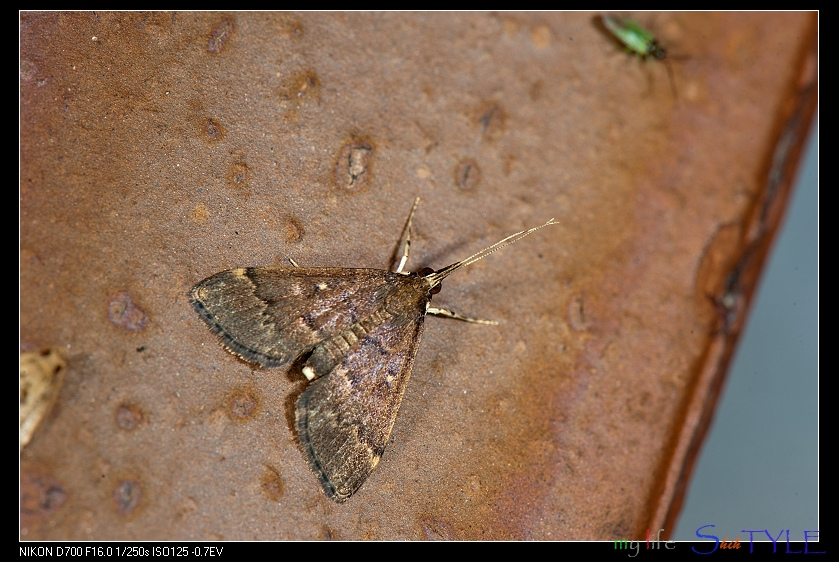

Scientific classification
- Kingdom: Animalia
- Phylum: Arthropoda
- Clade: Pancrustacea
- Class: Insecta
- Order: Lepidoptera
- Family: Crambidae
- Genus: Camptomastix
- Species: C. hisbonalis

Binomial name
- Camptomastix hisbonalis (Walker, 1859)

Synonyms
- Botys hisbonalis Walker, 1859; Botys pacalis Leech, 1889; Diplotyla longipalpis Butler, 1889; Thliptoceras areolifera Strand, 1918

= Camptomastix hisbonalis =

Species of moth

Camptomastix hisbonalis is a moth in the family Crambidae. It was described by Francis Walker in 1859. It is found on Borneo and in China, Taiwan, Papua New Guinea and Australia, where it has been recorded from New South Wales.
