= Tatobotys varanesalis =

Scientific classification
- Kingdom: Animalia
- Phylum: Arthropoda
- Class: Insecta
- Order: Lepidoptera
- Family: Crambidae
- Genus: Tatobotys
- Species: T. varanesalis

Binomial name
- Tatobotys varanesalis (Walker, 1859)

Synonyms
- Botys varanesalis Walker, 1859

Species of moth

Tatobotys varanesalis is a moth in the family Crambidae. It was described by Francis Walker in 1859. It is found on Borneo.

See taxonomic issues under Decticogaster
