= Duponchelia naitoi =

Scientific classification
- Domain: Eukaryota
- Kingdom: Animalia
- Phylum: Arthropoda
- Class: Insecta
- Order: Lepidoptera
- Family: Crambidae
- Genus: Duponchelia
- Species: D. naitoi

Binomial name
- Duponchelia naitoi Sasaki, 2008

Species of moth

Duponchelia naitoi is a moth in the family Crambidae. It was described by Sasaki in 2008. It is found in Japan.
