= Dolicharthria daralis =

Scientific classification
- Kingdom: Animalia
- Phylum: Arthropoda
- Class: Insecta
- Order: Lepidoptera
- Family: Crambidae
- Genus: Dolicharthria
- Species: D. daralis

Binomial name
- Dolicharthria daralis (Chretien, 1911)

Synonyms
- Stenia daralis Chretien, 1911; Metasia pseudobotys Rothschild, 1913; Metasia similalis Rothschild, 1915; Stenia bruguieralis var. mauretanica D. Lucas, 1950; Stenia heringi Rebel, 1939; Dolicharthria heringi

Species of moth

Dolicharthria daralis is a species of moth in the family Crambidae. It was described by Pierre Chrétien in 1911. It is found in Spain, on the Canary Islands and North Africa, including Tunisia, Algeria and Morocco.

The wingspan is 18–21 millimetres (0.71–0.83 in).
