= Steniodes deltoidalis =

Scientific classification
- Kingdom: Animalia
- Phylum: Arthropoda
- Class: Insecta
- Order: Lepidoptera
- Family: Crambidae
- Genus: Steniodes
- Species: S. deltoidalis

Binomial name
- Steniodes deltoidalis (Snellen, 1875)

Synonyms
- Metasia deltoidalis Snellen, 1875

Species of moth

Steniodes deltoidalis is a moth in the family Crambidae. It was described by Snellen in 1875. It is found in Colombia. It has a wingspan of 19mm.
