= Duponchelia caidalis =

Scientific classification
- Domain: Eukaryota
- Kingdom: Animalia
- Phylum: Arthropoda
- Class: Insecta
- Order: Lepidoptera
- Family: Crambidae
- Genus: Duponchelia
- Species: D. caidalis

Binomial name
- Duponchelia caidalis Oberthür, 1888

Synonyms
- Piletocera opacalis Rebel, 1926

Species of moth

Duponchelia caidalis is a moth in the family Crambidae. It was described by Oberthür in 1888. It is found in North Africa, where it has been recorded from Algeria and Egypt. It has also been recorded from the United Arab Emirates.
