= Hymenoptychis scalpellalis =

Scientific classification
- Kingdom: Animalia
- Phylum: Arthropoda
- Class: Insecta
- Order: Lepidoptera
- Family: Crambidae
- Genus: Hymenoptychis
- Species: H. scalpellalis

Binomial name
- Hymenoptychis scalpellalis Pagenstecher, 1886

Species of moth

Hymenoptychis scalpellalis is a moth in the family Crambidae. It was described by Pagenstecher in 1886. It is found in Indonesia, where it has been recorded from the Aru Islands.
