= Duponchelia lanceolalis =

Scientific classification
- Kingdom: Animalia
- Phylum: Arthropoda
- Class: Insecta
- Order: Lepidoptera
- Family: Crambidae
- Genus: Duponchelia
- Species: D. lanceolalis

Binomial name
- Duponchelia lanceolalis (Guenée, 1854)

Synonyms
- Stenia lanceolalis Guenée, 1854; Botys eanesalis Walker, 1859; Duponchelia lanceolatis Wallengren, 1872

Species of moth

Duponchelia lanceolalis is a moth in the family Crambidae. It was described by Achille Guenée in 1854. It is found in South Africa and Zimbabwe.
