= Steniodes nennuisalis =

Scientific classification
- Kingdom: Animalia
- Phylum: Arthropoda
- Class: Insecta
- Order: Lepidoptera
- Family: Crambidae
- Genus: Steniodes
- Species: S. nennuisalis

Binomial name
- Steniodes nennuisalis (Schaus, 1924)

Synonyms
- Stenia nennuisalis Schaus, 1924

Species of moth

Steniodes nennuisalis is a moth in the family Crambidae. It was described by Schaus in 1924. It is found in Peru.

The wingspan is about 28 mm. The wings are buff, irrorated with buffy brown. The forewings have a light buff antemedial line, outangled in the cell, outwardly shaded with fuscous from the subcostal to the inner margin. There is a fuscous annulus on the discocellular. The postmedial line is light buff, broadly shaded on both sides with fuscous. There are terminal triangular fuscous spots connected by a fine line. The hindwings are more whitish and thinly irrorated to the postmedial line which is whitish defined by slightly darker shading. The termen is more thickly irrorated with buffy brown and there is a diffuse terminal fuscous line.
