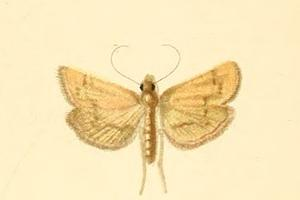

Scientific classification
- Kingdom: Animalia
- Phylum: Arthropoda
- Class: Insecta
- Order: Lepidoptera
- Family: Crambidae
- Genus: Dolicharthria
- Species: D. metasialis

Binomial name
- Dolicharthria metasialis (Rebel, 1916)

Synonyms
- Stenia metasialis Rebel, 1916

= Dolicharthria metasialis =

Species of moth

Dolicharthria metasialis is a species of moth in the family Crambidae. It is found on Crete.
