= Dolicharthria lubricalis =

Scientific classification
- Kingdom: Animalia
- Phylum: Arthropoda
- Class: Insecta
- Order: Lepidoptera
- Family: Crambidae
- Genus: Dolicharthria
- Species: D. lubricalis

Binomial name
- Dolicharthria lubricalis (Dognin, 1905)

Synonyms
- Stenia lubricalis Dognin, 1905

Species of moth

Dolicharthria lubricalis is a moth in the family Crambidae. It is found in Ecuador.
