= Loxostegopsis emigralis =

Scientific classification
- Kingdom: Animalia
- Phylum: Arthropoda
- Class: Insecta
- Order: Lepidoptera
- Family: Crambidae
- Genus: Loxostegopsis
- Species: L. emigralis

Binomial name
- Loxostegopsis emigralis (Barnes & McDunnough, 1918)

Synonyms
- Pyrausta emigralis Barnes & McDunnough, 1918

Species of moth

Loxostegopsis emigralis is a moth in the family Crambidae. It was described by William Barnes and James Halliday McDunnough in 1918. It is found in North America, where it has been recorded from Arizona and Texas.
