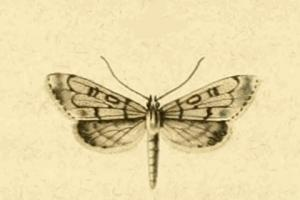

Scientific classification
- Kingdom: Animalia
- Phylum: Arthropoda
- Class: Insecta
- Order: Lepidoptera
- Family: Crambidae
- Genus: Dolicharthria
- Species: D. bruguieralis

Binomial name
- Dolicharthria bruguieralis (Duponchel, 1833)

Synonyms
- Botys bruguieralis Duponchel, 1833; Diasemia calcaralis Strand, 1918; Epistenia bruguieralis ab. infernalis Zerny, 1927; Metasia coniotalis Hampson, 1903; Stenia adelalis Guenée, 1854; Stenia bruguieralis tenebrosa Rothschild, 1929; Stenia afrella Turati, 1924; Stenia bruguieralis bahrlutalis Amsel, 1935

= Dolicharthria bruguieralis =

Species of moth

Dolicharthria bruguieralis is a species of moth in the family Crambidae. It is found from France, Portugal, Spain, Italy, Croatia, Romania, Bulgaria, the Republic of Macedonia, Albania, Greece and Turkey, east to Japan and Taiwan. It is also found in Africa, including Morocco, Algeria and South Africa.

The wingspan is about 17 millimetres (0.67 in).
