= Dolicharthria cerialis =

Scientific classification
- Kingdom: Animalia
- Phylum: Arthropoda
- Class: Insecta
- Order: Lepidoptera
- Family: Crambidae
- Genus: Dolicharthria
- Species: D. cerialis

Binomial name
- Dolicharthria cerialis (Stoll in Cramer & Stoll, 1782)

Synonyms
- Phalaena (Pyralis) cerialis Stoll in Cramer & Stoll, 1782

Species of moth

Dolicharthria cerialis is a moth in the family Crambidae. It was described by Stoll in 1782. It is found in Suriname.
