= Tatobotys africana =

Scientific classification
- Kingdom: Animalia
- Phylum: Arthropoda
- Class: Insecta
- Order: Lepidoptera
- Family: Crambidae
- Genus: Tatobotys
- Species: T. africana

Binomial name
- Tatobotys africana (Ghesquière, 1942)

Synonyms
- Decticogaster africana Ghesquière, 1942

Species of moth

Tatobotys africana is a moth in the family Crambidae. It was described by Jean Ghesquière in 1942. It is found in the area of the former province Équateur in the Democratic Republic of the Congo.
