= Tatobotys albivenalis =

Scientific classification
- Kingdom: Animalia
- Phylum: Arthropoda
- Class: Insecta
- Order: Lepidoptera
- Family: Crambidae
- Genus: Tatobotys
- Species: T. albivenalis

Binomial name
- Tatobotys albivenalis Hampson, 1897

Species of moth

Tatobotys albivenalis is a moth in the family Crambidae. It was described by George Hampson in 1897. It is found in Japan's Ogasawara Islands.

The wingspan is about 28 mm. Adults are fuscous, the forewings with whitish veins and a dark sinuous antemedial line defined by whitish on the inner edge and interrupted by the veins. There is a pale streak beyond it below the cell, as well as a pale streak in the cell and a speck in the end of the cell. There is also a discoidal lunule and a dark postmedial line, defined by whitish on the outer side and interrupted by the veins. It is excurved below the costa, then nearly straight to vein 2, where it is retracted to below the end of the cell. The hindwings have a dark postmedial line, slightly defined by whitish and excurved between veins 5 and 2, the retracted to the lower angle of the cell, the veins beyond which are whitish.
