= Dolicharthria aquirrealis =

Scientific classification
- Kingdom: Animalia
- Phylum: Arthropoda
- Class: Insecta
- Order: Lepidoptera
- Family: Crambidae
- Genus: Dolicharthria
- Species: D. aquirrealis

Binomial name
- Dolicharthria aquirrealis (Schaus, 1940)

Synonyms
- Stenia aquirrealis Schaus, 1940

Species of moth

Dolicharthria aquirrealis is a moth in the family Crambidae. It was described by William Schaus in 1940. It is found in Puerto Rico.
