= Steniodes dominicalis =

Scientific classification
- Kingdom: Animalia
- Phylum: Arthropoda
- Class: Insecta
- Order: Lepidoptera
- Family: Crambidae
- Genus: Steniodes
- Species: S. dominicalis

Binomial name
- Steniodes dominicalis (Schaus, 1924)

Synonyms
- Stenia dominicalis Schaus, 1924

Species of moth

Steniodes dominicalis is a moth in the family Crambidae. It was described by Schaus in 1924 and can be found on Dominica.

Their wingspan is about 18 mm. The wings are buffy brown, the forewings with a fuscous antemedial line, slightly outangled on the median and followed in the cell by a small fuscous annulus and a larger annulus over the discocellular. The postmedial line is fuscous, distally edged with white except where retracted along vein 2. It is dentate from the costa, inangled at the fold and retracted at vein 2 to near the cel, finally curved and slightly outbent below vein 2 to the inner margin. There are terminal black spots on the interspaces. The hindwings have a pale postmedial line, which is shaded by dark on both sides. There are also small triangular black terminal spots.
