= Dolicharthria triflexalis =

Scientific classification
- Kingdom: Animalia
- Phylum: Arthropoda
- Class: Insecta
- Order: Lepidoptera
- Family: Crambidae
- Genus: Dolicharthria
- Species: D. triflexalis

Binomial name
- Dolicharthria triflexalis (Gaede, 1916)

Synonyms
- Stenia triflexalis Gaede, 1916

Species of moth

Dolicharthria triflexalis is a moth in the family Crambidae. It was described by Max Gaede in 1916. It is found in Cameroon.
