= Tatobotys angustalis =

Scientific classification
- Kingdom: Animalia
- Phylum: Arthropoda
- Class: Insecta
- Order: Lepidoptera
- Family: Crambidae
- Genus: Tatobotys
- Species: T. angustalis

Binomial name
- Tatobotys angustalis Caradja & Meyrick, 1933

Species of moth

Tatobotys angustalis is a moth in the family Crambidae. It was described by Aristide Caradja and Edward Meyrick in 1933. It is found in Guangdong, China.
