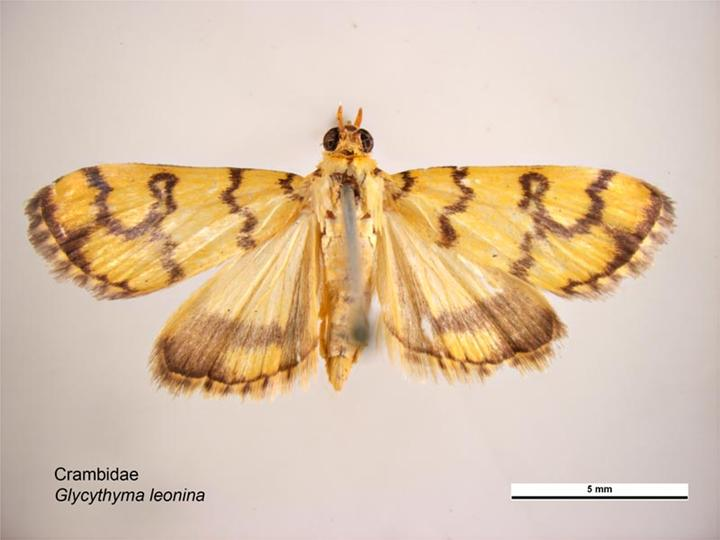
- Dorsal view
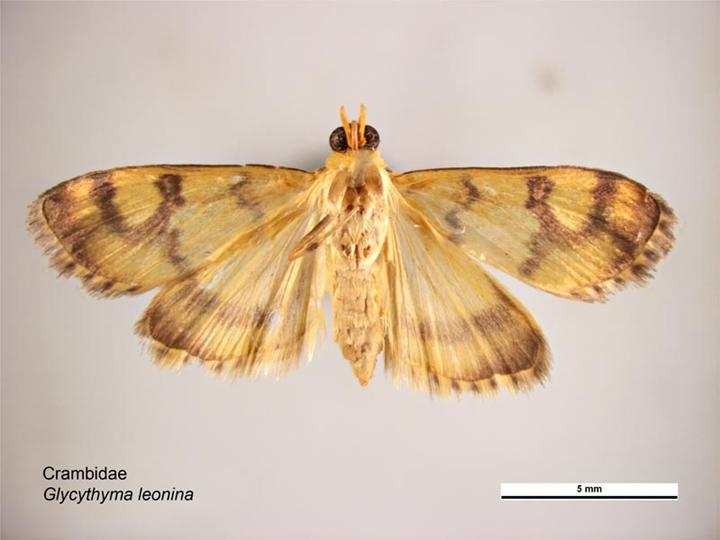
- Ventral view

Scientific classification
- Kingdom: Animalia
- Phylum: Arthropoda
- Clade: Pancrustacea
- Class: Insecta
- Order: Lepidoptera
- Family: Crambidae
- Genus: Glycythyma
- Species: G. leonina

Binomial name
- Glycythyma leonina (Butler, 1886)

Synonyms
- Asopia leonina Butler, 1886

= Glycythyma leonina =

Species of moth

Glycythyma leonina is a moth of the family Crambidae described by Arthur Gardiner Butler in 1886. It is found in eastern Australia, including the Australian Capital Territory and Queensland.

The wingspan is about 10 mm. Adults are yellow with brown lines across each wing.
