= Duponchelia ranalis =

Scientific classification
- Kingdom: Animalia
- Phylum: Arthropoda
- Class: Insecta
- Order: Lepidoptera
- Family: Crambidae
- Genus: Duponchelia
- Species: D. ranalis

Binomial name
- Duponchelia ranalis (Hampson, 1907)

Synonyms
- Piletocera ranalis Hampson, 1907

Species of moth

Duponchelia ranalis is a moth in the family Crambidae. It was described by George Hampson in 1907. It is found in Paraná, Brazil.
