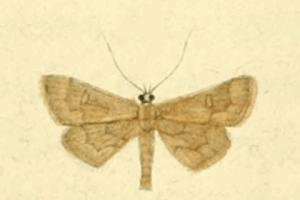

Scientific classification
- Kingdom: Animalia
- Phylum: Arthropoda
- Class: Insecta
- Order: Lepidoptera
- Family: Crambidae
- Genus: Dolicharthria
- Species: D. aetnaealis

Binomial name
- Dolicharthria aetnaealis (Duponchel, 1833)

Synonyms
- Asopia aetnaealis Duponchel, 1833; Dolicharthria aetnealis P. Leraut, 1980; Cledeobia aetnaealis lorquinalis Guenée, 1854; Stenia flavipunctalis Hampson, 1900; Stenia fuscocilialis Ragonot, 1881; Scopula concoloralis Oberthür, 1876; Stenia punctalis f. mutantalis Caradja, 1928; Stenia punctalis gigantalis Zerny, 1935; Stenia punctalis zernyi Klima, 1937

= Dolicharthria aetnaealis =

Species of moth

Dolicharthria aetnaealis is a species of moth in the family Crambidae. It is found in France, Portugal and Spain, as well as North Africa, including Algeria and Morocco.
