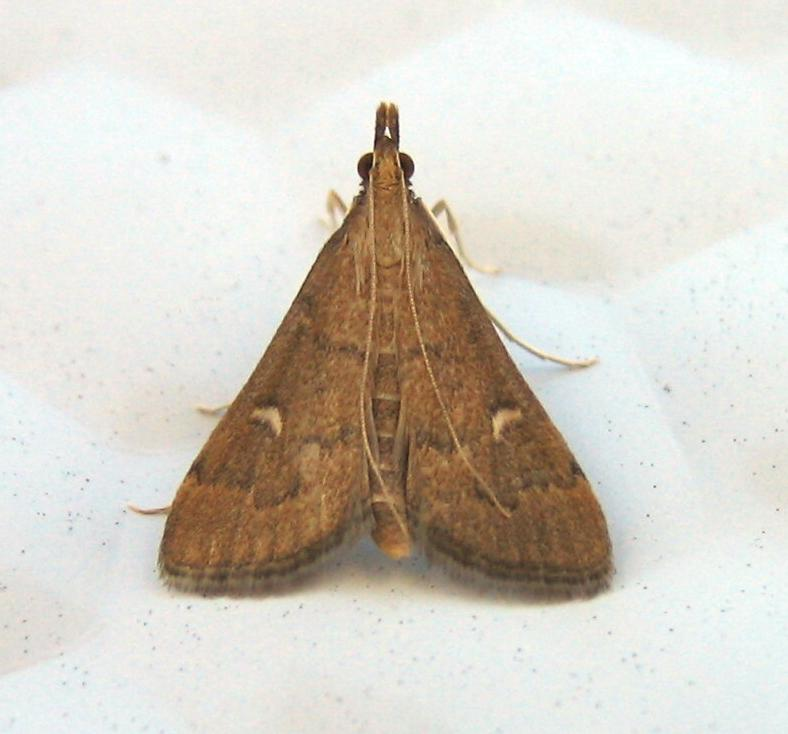
- Adult D. punctalis, Roussillon (France)

Scientific classification
- Kingdom: Animalia
- Phylum: Arthropoda
- Clade: Pancrustacea
- Class: Insecta
- Order: Lepidoptera
- Family: Crambidae
- Subfamily: Spilomelinae
- Tribe: Steniini
- Genus: Dolicharthria; Stephens, 1834

Synonyms
- Amaurophanes Lederer, 1863; Dolycharthria Stephens, 1850; Leptarchis Meyrick, 1937; Parastenia Hartig, 1940; Epistenia Chrétien, 1911; Stenia Duponchel, 1845

= Dolicharthria =

Genus of moths

Dolicharthria is a genus of small moths belonging to the family Crambidae. Stenia is usually synonymized with it, but may be distinct.

== Species ==
- Dolicharthria aetnaealis (Duponchel, 1833)
- Dolicharthria aquirrealis (Schaus, 1940)
- Dolicharthria bruguieralis (Duponchel, 1833)
- Dolicharthria carbonalis (Warren, 1896)
- Dolicharthria cerialis (Stoll in Cramer & Stoll, 1782)
- Dolicharthria daralis (Chrétien, 1911)
- Dolicharthria desertalis Hampson, 1907
- Dolicharthria grisealis (Hampson, 1899)
- Dolicharthria hieralis (Swinhoe, 1904)
- Dolicharthria intervacatalis (Christoph, 1877)
- Dolicharthria lubricalis (Dognin, 1905)
- Dolicharthria mabillealis (Viette, 1953)
- Dolicharthria metasialis (Rebel, 1916)
- Dolicharthria modestalis (Saalmüller, 1880)
- Dolicharthria paediusalis (Walker, 1859)
- Dolicharthria phaeospilalis (Hampson, 1907)
- Dolicharthria psologramma (Meyrick, 1937)
- Dolicharthria punctalis (Denis & Schiffermüller, 1775)
- Dolicharthria retractalis (Hampson, 1912)
- Dolicharthria retractalis (Hampson, 1917)
- Dolicharthria signatalis (Zeller, 1852)
- Dolicharthria stigmosalis (Herrich-Schäffer, 1848)
- Dolicharthria tenebrosalis (Rothschild, 1915)
- Dolicharthria tenellalis (Snellen, 1895)
- Dolicharthria triflexalis (Gaede, 1916)

== Former species ==
- Dolicharthria heringi (Rebel, 1939)
