= Loxostegopsis xanthocepsalis =

Scientific classification
- Kingdom: Animalia
- Phylum: Arthropoda
- Class: Insecta
- Order: Lepidoptera
- Family: Crambidae
- Genus: Loxostegopsis
- Species: L. xanthocepsalis

Binomial name
- Loxostegopsis xanthocepsalis (Hampson, 1918)

Synonyms
- Pyrausta xanthocepsalis Hampson, 1918

Species of moth

Loxostegopsis xanthocepsalis is a moth in the family Crambidae. It was described by George Hampson in 1918. It is found in Guerrero, Mexico.
