= Dolicharthria intervacatalis =

Scientific classification
- Kingdom: Animalia
- Phylum: Arthropoda
- Class: Insecta
- Order: Lepidoptera
- Family: Crambidae
- Genus: Dolicharthria
- Species: D. intervacatalis

Binomial name
- Dolicharthria intervacatalis (Christoph, 1877)

Synonyms
- Stenia intervacatalis Christoph, 1877

Species of moth

Dolicharthria intervacatalis is a moth in the family Crambidae. It was described by Hugo Theodor Christoph in 1877. It is found in Iran.
