= Dolicharthria modestalis =

Scientific classification
- Kingdom: Animalia
- Phylum: Arthropoda
- Clade: Pancrustacea
- Class: Insecta
- Order: Lepidoptera
- Family: Crambidae
- Genus: Dolicharthria
- Species: D. modestalis

Binomial name
- Dolicharthria modestalis (Saalmüller, 1880)

Synonyms
- Stenia modestalis Saalmüller, 1880

Species of moth

Dolicharthria modestalis is a moth in the family Crambidae. It was described by Saalmüller in 1880. It is found in Madagascar.
