= Hymenoptychis dentilinealis =

Scientific classification
- Kingdom: Animalia
- Phylum: Arthropoda
- Class: Insecta
- Order: Lepidoptera
- Family: Crambidae
- Genus: Hymenoptychis
- Species: H. dentilinealis

Binomial name
- Hymenoptychis dentilinealis Snellen, 1880

Species of moth

Hymenoptychis dentilinealis is a moth in the family Crambidae. It was described by Snellen in 1880. It is found on Sumatra.
