= Dolicharthria retractalis =

Scientific classification
- Kingdom: Animalia
- Phylum: Arthropoda
- Class: Insecta
- Order: Lepidoptera
- Family: Crambidae
- Genus: Dolicharthria
- Species: D. retractalis

Binomial name
- Dolicharthria retractalis (Hampson, 1912)

Synonyms
- Nacoleia retractalis Hampson, 1912; Hedylepta dircealis Druce, 1895

Species of moth

Dolicharthria retractalis is a species of moth in the family Crambidae. It was described by George Hampson in 1912. It is found in Mexico.

== Taxonomy ==
Dolicharthria retractalis Hampson, 1917 is a secondary homonym. A replacement name is not yet available.
