= Dolicharthria paediusalis =

Scientific classification
- Kingdom: Animalia
- Phylum: Arthropoda
- Clade: Pancrustacea
- Class: Insecta
- Order: Lepidoptera
- Family: Crambidae
- Genus: Dolicharthria
- Species: D. paediusalis

Binomial name
- Dolicharthria paediusalis (Walker, 1859)

Synonyms
- Scopula paediusalis Walker, 1859; Stenia poediusalis Hampson, 1897

Species of moth

Dolicharthria paediusalis is a moth in the family Crambidae. It was described by Francis Walker in 1859. It is found in the Democratic Republic of the Congo, South Africa and Yemen.
