= Camptomastix septentrionalis =

Scientific classification
- Kingdom: Animalia
- Phylum: Arthropoda
- Clade: Pancrustacea
- Class: Insecta
- Order: Lepidoptera
- Family: Crambidae
- Genus: Camptomastix
- Species: C. septentrionalis

Binomial name
- Camptomastix septentrionalis Inoue, 1982

Species of moth

Camptomastix septentrionalis is a moth in the family Crambidae. It was described by Hiroshi Inoue in 1982. It is found in Japan.
