= Dolicharthria tenebrosalis =

Scientific classification
- Kingdom: Animalia
- Phylum: Arthropoda
- Class: Insecta
- Order: Lepidoptera
- Family: Crambidae
- Genus: Dolicharthria
- Species: D. tenebrosalis

Binomial name
- Dolicharthria tenebrosalis (Rothschild, 1915)

Synonyms
- Stenia tenebrosalis Rothschild, 1915

Species of moth

Dolicharthria tenebrosalis is a moth in the family Crambidae. It was described by Rothschild in 1915. It is found in Papua New Guinea.
