= Dolicharthria desertalis =

Scientific classification
- Kingdom: Animalia
- Phylum: Arthropoda
- Class: Insecta
- Order: Lepidoptera
- Family: Crambidae
- Genus: Dolicharthria
- Species: D. desertalis

Binomial name
- Dolicharthria desertalis (Hampson, 1907)

Synonyms
- Stenia desertalis Hampson, 1907

Species of moth

Dolicharthria desertalis is a moth in the family Crambidae. It was described by George Hampson in 1907. It is found in South Africa.
