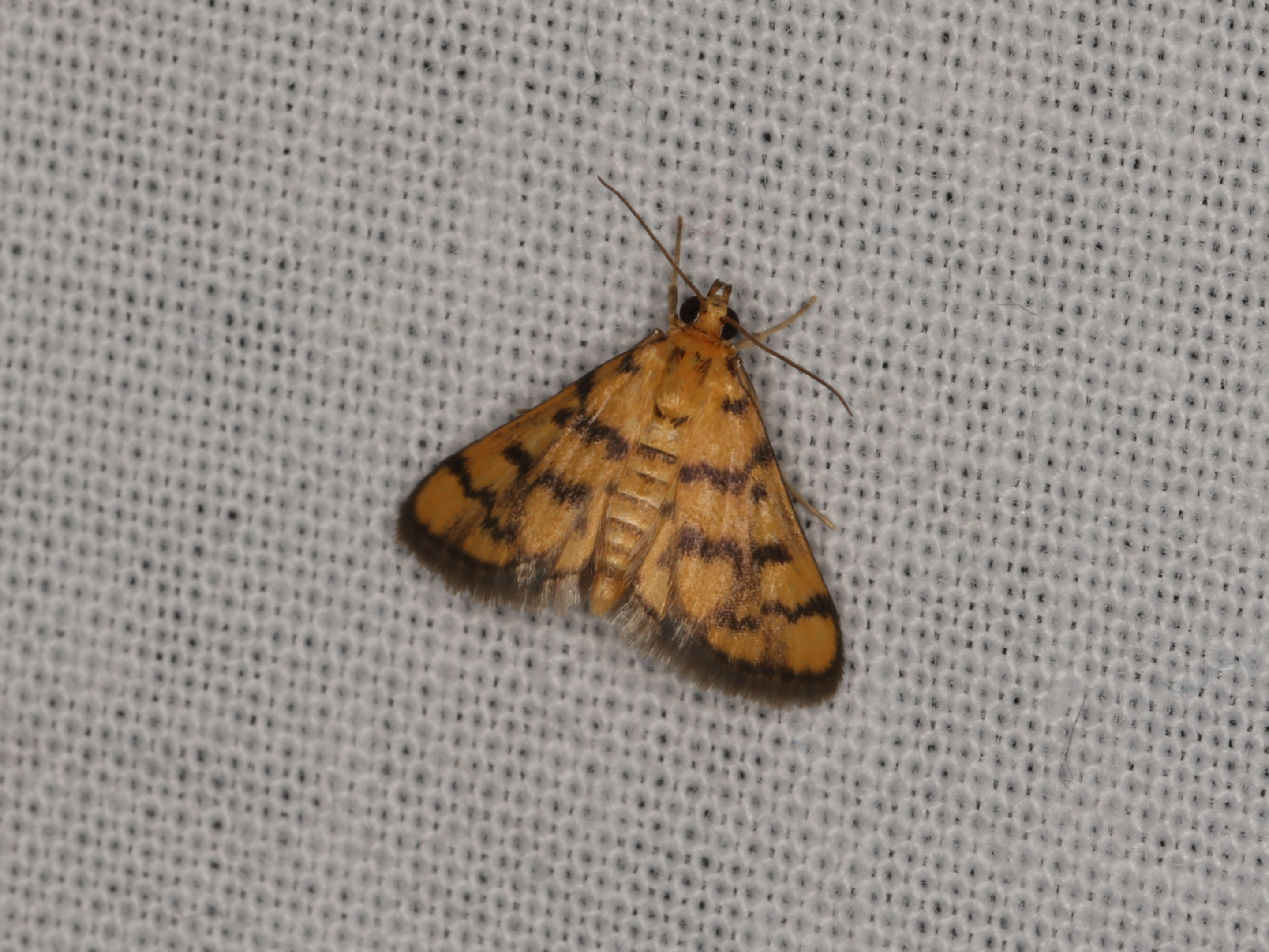

Scientific classification
- Kingdom: Animalia
- Phylum: Arthropoda
- Clade: Pancrustacea
- Class: Insecta
- Order: Lepidoptera
- Family: Crambidae
- Genus: Glycythyma
- Species: G. thymedes

Binomial name
- Glycythyma thymedes Turner, 1908

= Glycythyma thymedes =

Species of moth

Glycythyma thymedes is a moth in the family Crambidae. It was described by Turner in 1908. It is found in Australia, where it has been recorded from Queensland, Western Australia and the Northern Territory.

The wingspan is about 10 mm. Adults are yellow with wiggly brown lines across the wings.
