= Loxostegopsis polle =

Scientific classification
- Kingdom: Animalia
- Phylum: Arthropoda
- Class: Insecta
- Order: Lepidoptera
- Family: Crambidae
- Genus: Loxostegopsis
- Species: L. polle

Binomial name
- Loxostegopsis polle Dyar, 1917

Species of moth

Loxostegopsis polle is a moth in the family Crambidae. It was described by Harrison Gray Dyar Jr. in 1917. It is found in North America, where it has been recorded from Arizona, California, Nevada, New Mexico, Texas, Wyoming and Alberta. The habitat consist of short grass prairie. Adults have been recorded from May to June and in September.
