= Dolicharthria hieralis =

Scientific classification
- Kingdom: Animalia
- Phylum: Arthropoda
- Class: Insecta
- Order: Lepidoptera
- Family: Crambidae
- Genus: Dolicharthria
- Species: D. hieralis

Binomial name
- Dolicharthria hieralis (C. Swinhoe, 1904)

Synonyms
- Stenia hieralis C. Swinhoe, 1904

Species of moth

Dolicharthria hieralis is a moth in the family Crambidae. It was described by Charles Swinhoe in 1904. It is found on Borneo.
