= Dolicharthria tenellalis =

Scientific classification
- Kingdom: Animalia
- Phylum: Arthropoda
- Class: Insecta
- Order: Lepidoptera
- Family: Crambidae
- Genus: Dolicharthria
- Species: D. tenellalis

Binomial name
- Dolicharthria tenellalis (Snellen, 1895)

Synonyms
- Stenia tenellalis Snellen, 1895

Species of moth

Dolicharthria tenellalis is a moth in the family Crambidae. It was described by Snellen in 1895. It is found on Java.
