= Steniodes costipunctalis =

Scientific classification
- Kingdom: Animalia
- Phylum: Arthropoda
- Class: Insecta
- Order: Lepidoptera
- Family: Crambidae
- Genus: Steniodes
- Species: S. costipunctalis

Binomial name
- Steniodes costipunctalis Snellen, 1899

Species of insect

Steniodes costipunctalis is a moth in the family Crambidae. It was described by Snellen in 1899. It is found in Indonesia (Java).
