= Loxostegopsis curialis =

Scientific classification
- Kingdom: Animalia
- Phylum: Arthropoda
- Class: Insecta
- Order: Lepidoptera
- Family: Crambidae
- Genus: Loxostegopsis
- Species: L. curialis

Binomial name
- Loxostegopsis curialis Barnes & McDunnough, 1918

Species of moth

Loxostegopsis curialis is a moth in the family Crambidae. It was described by William Barnes and James Halliday McDunnough in 1918. It is found in North America, where it has been recorded from California, New Mexico, Texas and Utah.
