= Tatobotys vibrata =

Scientific classification
- Kingdom: Animalia
- Phylum: Arthropoda
- Class: Insecta
- Order: Lepidoptera
- Family: Crambidae
- Genus: Tatobotys
- Species: T. vibrata

Binomial name
- Tatobotys vibrata Meyrick, 1929

Species of moth

Tatobotys vibrata is a moth in the family Crambidae. It was described by Edward Meyrick in 1929. It is found in French Polynesia, where it has been recorded from the Marquesas Islands.
