= Dolicharthria signatalis =

Scientific classification
- Kingdom: Animalia
- Phylum: Arthropoda
- Clade: Pancrustacea
- Class: Insecta
- Order: Lepidoptera
- Family: Crambidae
- Genus: Dolicharthria
- Species: D. signatalis

Binomial name
- Dolicharthria signatalis (Zeller, 1852)

Synonyms
- Stenia signatalis Zeller, 1852

Species of moth

Dolicharthria signatalis is a moth in the family Crambidae. It was described by Zeller in 1852. It is found in South Africa.
