= Hymenoptychis phryganidalis =

Scientific classification
- Kingdom: Animalia
- Phylum: Arthropoda
- Class: Insecta
- Order: Lepidoptera
- Family: Crambidae
- Genus: Hymenoptychis
- Species: H. phryganidalis

Binomial name
- Hymenoptychis phryganidalis Pagenstecher, 1886

Species of moth

Hymenoptychis phryganidalis is a moth in the family Crambidae. It was described by Pagenstecher in 1886. It is found in Indonesia, where it has been recorded from the Aru Islands.
