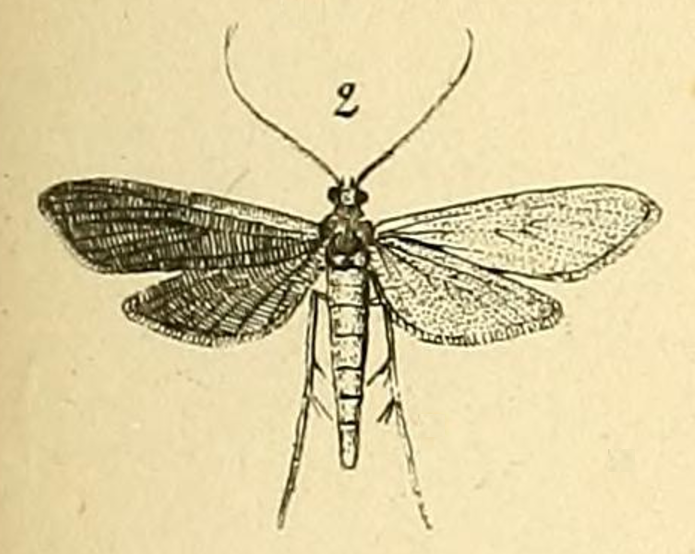
- H. sordida.

Scientific classification
- Kingdom: Animalia
- Phylum: Arthropoda
- Class: Insecta
- Order: Lepidoptera
- Family: Crambidae
- Subfamily: Spilomelinae
- Genus: Hymenoptychis; Zeller, 1852

Type species
- Hymenoptychis sordida Zeller, 1852

Synonyms
- Syrbatis Walker, 1863

= Hymenoptychis =

Genus of moths

Hymenoptychis is a genus of moths of the family Crambidae.

== Species ==
- Hymenoptychis dentilinealis Snellen, 1880
- Hymenoptychis phryganidalis Pagenstecher, 1886
- Hymenoptychis scalpellalis Pagenstecher, 1886
- Hymenoptychis sordida Zeller, 1852
