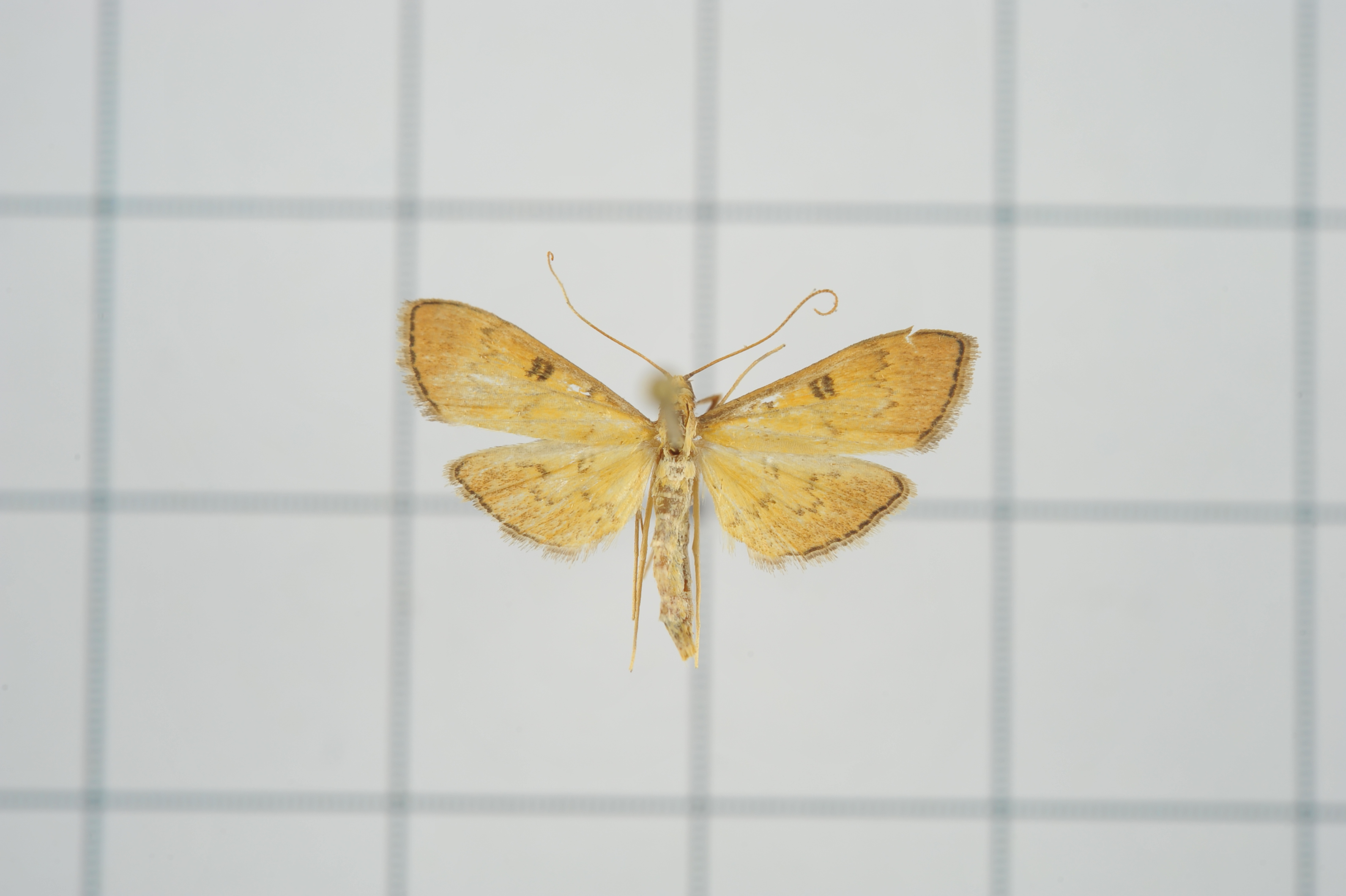

Scientific classification
- Kingdom: Animalia
- Phylum: Arthropoda
- Class: Insecta
- Order: Lepidoptera
- Family: Crambidae
- Genus: Tatobotys
- Species: T. depalpalis

Binomial name
- Tatobotys depalpalis Strand, 1919

Synonyms
- Tatobotys amoyalis Caradja, 1932

= Tatobotys depalpalis =

Species of moth

Tatobotys depalpalis is a moth in the family Crambidae. It was described by Strand in 1919. It is found in Taiwan and China (Fujian).
