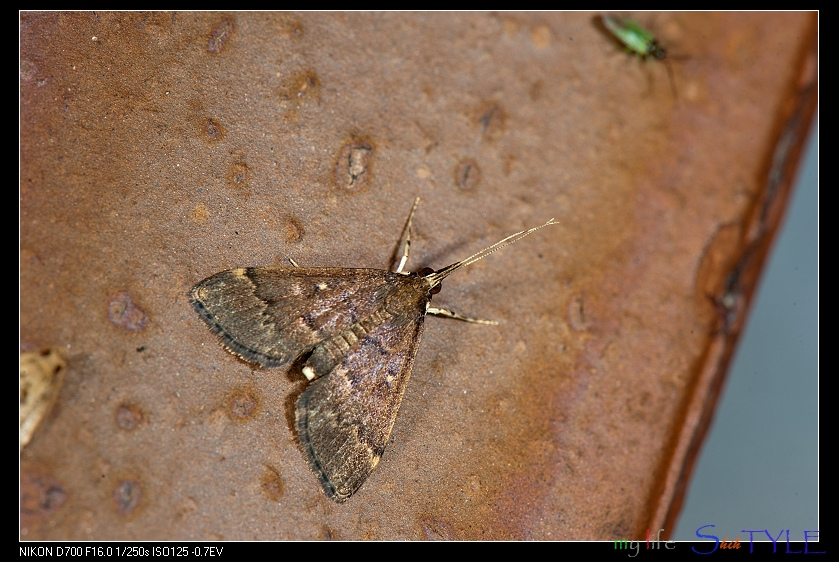

Scientific classification
- Kingdom: Animalia
- Phylum: Arthropoda
- Clade: Pancrustacea
- Class: Insecta
- Order: Lepidoptera
- Family: Crambidae
- Subfamily: Spilomelinae
- Genus: Camptomastix; Warren, 1892

Synonyms
- Camptomastyx Hampson, 1896

= Camptomastix =

Genus of moths

Camptomastix is a genus of moths of the family Crambidae.

== Species ==
- Camptomastix hisbonalis (Walker, 1859)
- Camptomastix septentrionalis Inoue, 1982
