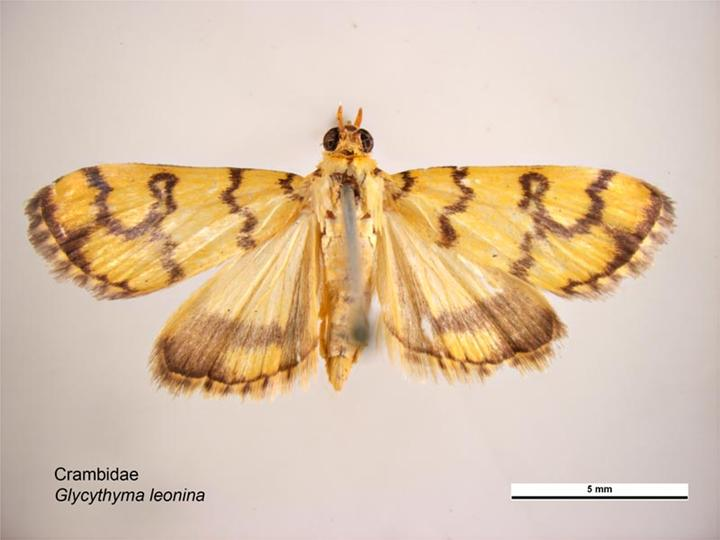
- Glycythuma leonina

Scientific classification
- Kingdom: Animalia
- Phylum: Arthropoda
- Clade: Pancrustacea
- Class: Insecta
- Order: Lepidoptera
- Family: Crambidae
- Subfamily: Spilomelinae
- Genus: Glycythyma; Turner, 1908

= Glycythyma =

Genus of moths

Glycythyma is a genus of moths of the family Crambidae.

== Species ==
- Glycythyma chrysorycta (Meyrick, 1884)
- Glycythyma leonina (Butler, 1886)
- Glycythyma thymedes Turner, 1908
- Glycythyma xanthoscota (Lower, 1903)
