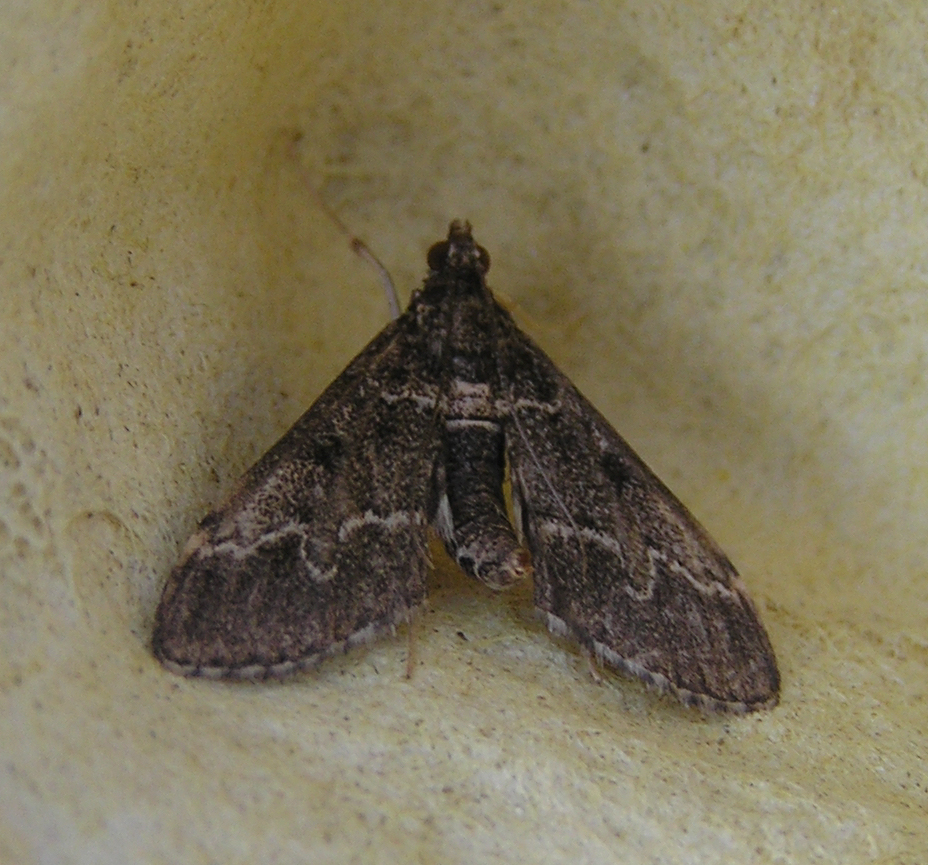
- Duponchelia fovealis

Scientific classification
- Domain: Eukaryota
- Kingdom: Animalia
- Phylum: Arthropoda
- Class: Insecta
- Order: Lepidoptera
- Family: Crambidae
- Subfamily: Spilomelinae
- Genus: Duponchelia; Zeller, 1847

= Duponchelia =

Genus of moths

Duponchelia is a genus of moths of the family Crambidae.

== Species ==
- Duponchelia caidalis Oberthür, 1888
- Duponchelia fovealis Zeller, 1847
- Duponchelia lanceolalis (Guenée, 1854)
- Duponchelia naitoi Sasaki, 2008
- Duponchelia ranalis (Hampson, 1907)
