= Steniodes gelliasalis =

Scientific classification
- Kingdom: Animalia
- Phylum: Arthropoda
- Class: Insecta
- Order: Lepidoptera
- Family: Crambidae
- Genus: Steniodes
- Species: S. gelliasalis

Binomial name
- Steniodes gelliasalis (Walker, 1859)

Synonyms
- Botys gelliasalis Walker, 1859; Steniodes lutealis Snellen, 1875

Species of moth

Steniodes gelliasalis is a moth in the family Crambidae. It was described by Francis Walker in 1859. It is found in Brazil, Colombia and the West Indies, where it has been recorded from Jamaica.

The wingspan is 13–15 mm.
