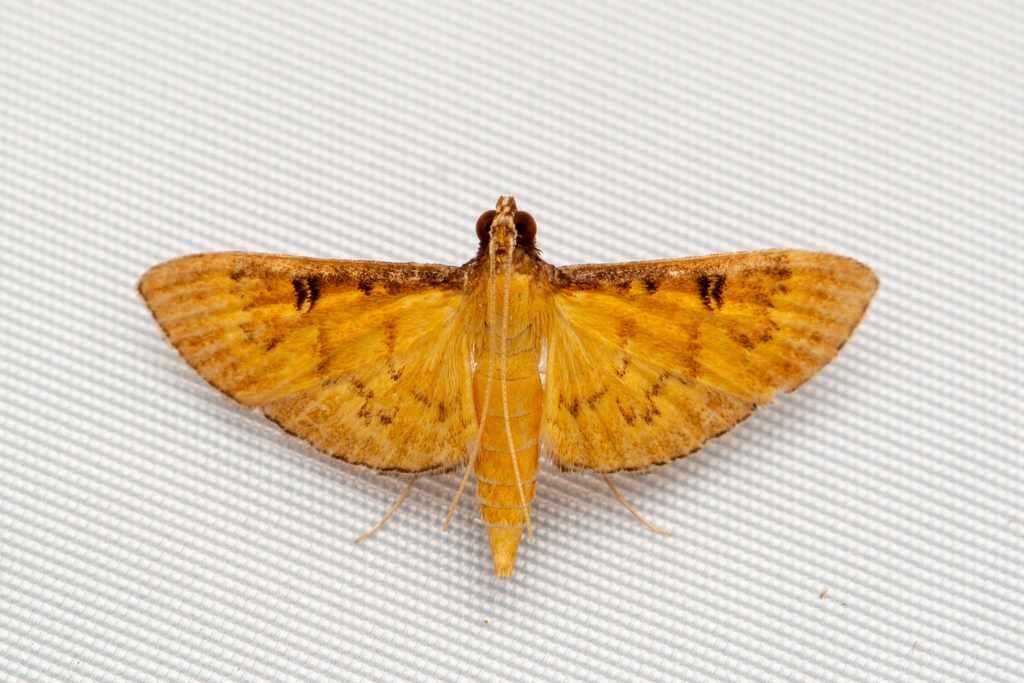

Scientific classification
- Kingdom: Animalia
- Phylum: Arthropoda
- Class: Insecta
- Order: Lepidoptera
- Family: Crambidae
- Genus: Tatobotys
- Species: T. biannulalis

Binomial name
- Tatobotys biannulalis (Walker, 1866)

Synonyms
- Botys biannulalis Walker, 1866; Cometura picrogramma Meyrick, 1886

= Tatobotys biannulalis =

Species of moth

Tatobotys biannulalis is a moth in the family Crambidae. It was described by Francis Walker in 1866. It is found on Borneo and in Indonesia (the Sula Islands), the New Hebrides, Fiji, Samoa, Japan, Sri Lanka and Australia, where it has been recorded from the Northern Territory and Queensland.
