= Loxostegopsis =

Scientific classification
- Kingdom: Animalia
- Phylum: Arthropoda
- Class: Insecta
- Order: Lepidoptera
- Family: Crambidae
- Subfamily: Spilomelinae
- Genus: Loxostegopsis; Dyar, 1917

Synonyms
- Loxotegopsis Dyar, 1917

Genus of moths

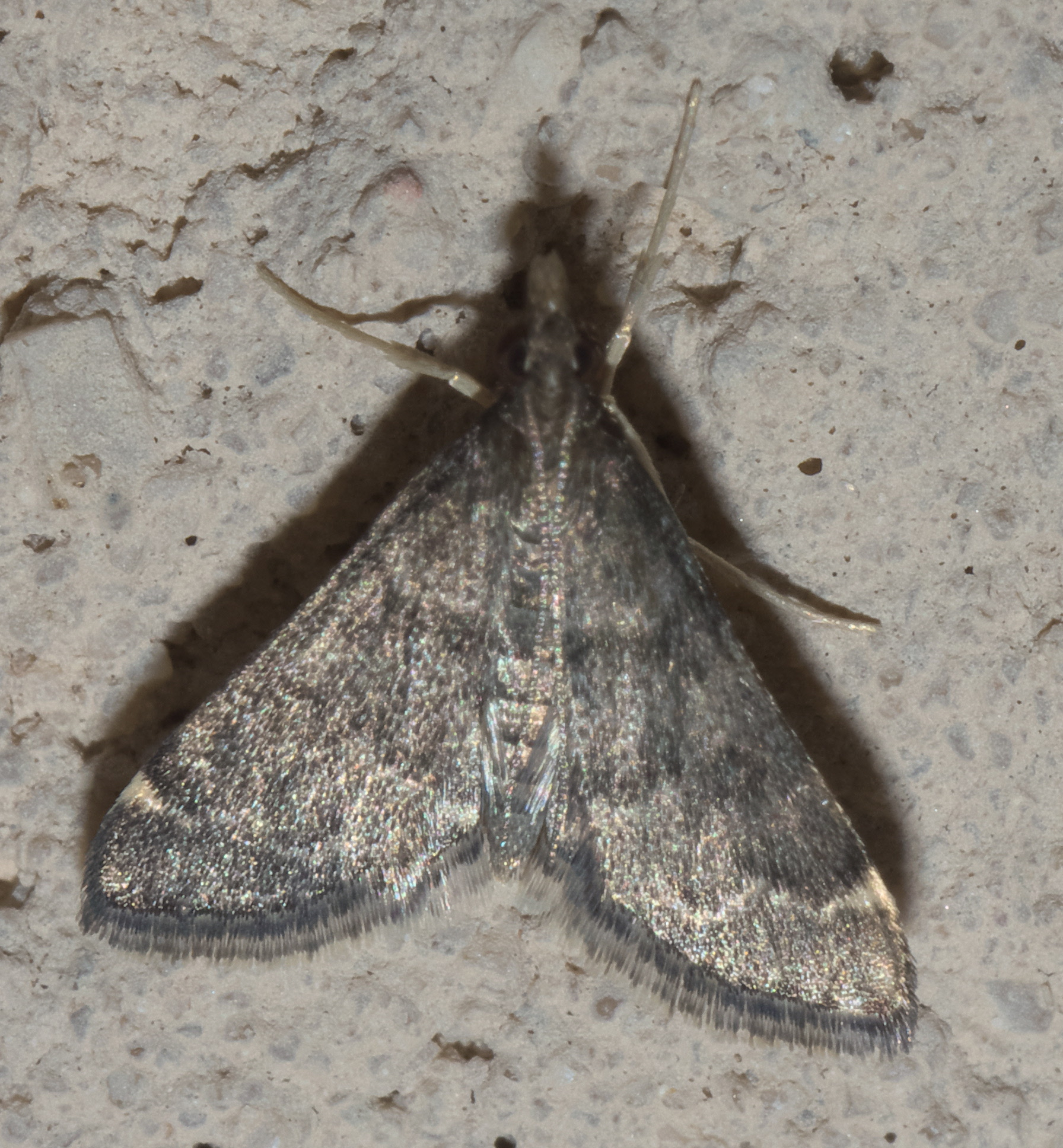
Loxostegopsis merrickalis

Loxostegopsis is a genus of moths of the family Crambidae.

== Species ==
- Loxostegopsis curialis Barnes & McDunnough, 1918
- Loxostegopsis emigralis (Barnes & McDunnough, 1918)
- Loxostegopsis merrickalis (Barnes & McDunnough, 1918)
- Loxostegopsis polle Dyar, 1917
- Loxostegopsis xanthocepsalis (Hampson, 1918)
- Loxostegopsis xanthocrypta
