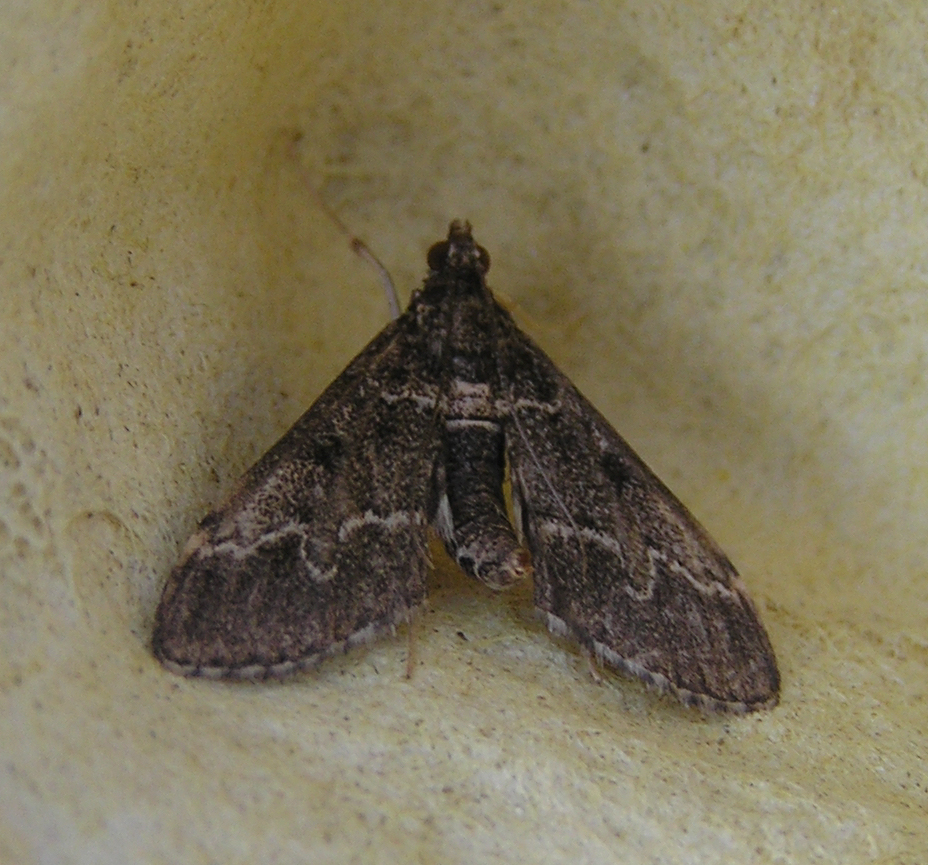

Scientific classification
- Kingdom: Animalia
- Phylum: Arthropoda
- Clade: Pancrustacea
- Class: Insecta
- Order: Lepidoptera
- Family: Crambidae
- Genus: Duponchelia
- Species: D. fovealis

Binomial name
- Duponchelia fovealis Zeller, 1847

Synonyms
- Decticogaster komiensis Ghesquière, 1942; Duponchelia caidalis Oberthür, 1888; Duponchelia floeschlalis Legrand, 1965; Duponchelia eanuisalis Millière, 1869; Hymenia griseata Butler, 1875; Stenia canuisalis Millière, 1868; Stenia uniflexalis Mabille, 1879

= Duponchelia fovealis =

Species of moth

Duponchelia fovealis is a species of moth of the family Crambidae described by Philipp Christoph Zeller in 1847. It is endemic to the area surrounding the Mediterranean Sea, and the Canary Islands, but has extended its range to other parts of Africa, Europe, the Middle East and North America.

== Description ==
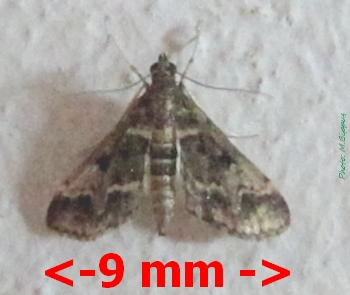

Adult wingspan is about 20 mm. The moth flies from May to June, depending on the location.

The larvae feed on various plants. Hosts include a wide range of mostly herbaceous ornamental plants and field crops, such as Anemone, Anthurium, Begonia, Cyclamen, Euphorbia, Gerbera, Kalanchoe, Limonium, Rosa, certain aquatic plants, corn, cucumbers, peppers, pomegranate, tomatoes, and certain herbs.

== Invasive pest in the US ==
The first record of Duponchelia fovealis in North America was in California where live larvae were detected in a shipment of begonias at a Home Depot in the city of Concord in Contra Costa County from the city of San Marcos in San Diego County (CDFA, NAPIS, 2005). In the spring of 2005, this species was discovered in three greenhouses in southern Ontario, Canada. In July, 2010, four male moths were collected in a pheromone trap in San Diego County, California.

On November 1, 2010, the USDA-AHIS announced this moth was present in at least 13 U.S. states.
