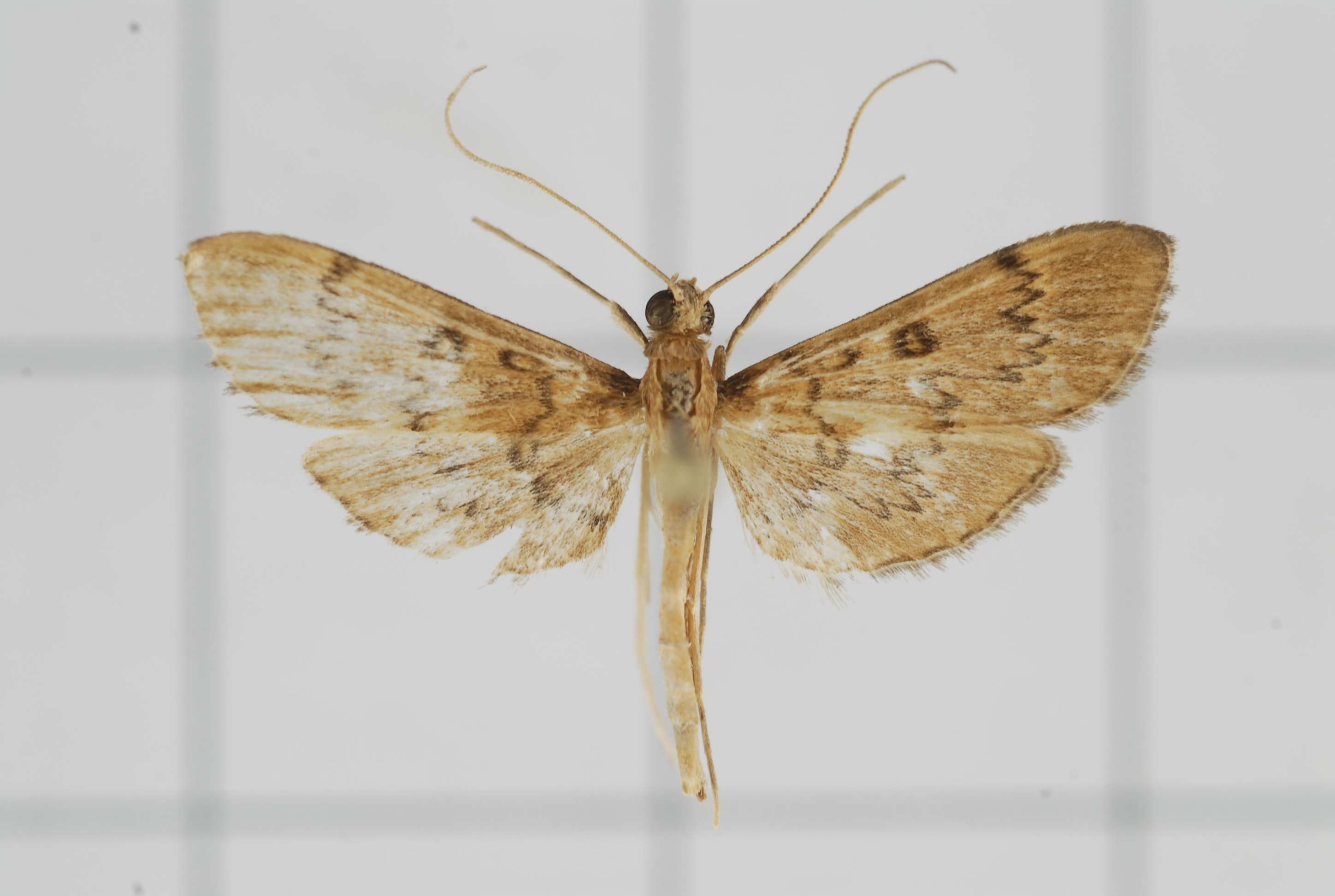

Scientific classification
- Kingdom: Animalia
- Phylum: Arthropoda
- Class: Insecta
- Order: Lepidoptera
- Family: Crambidae
- Genus: Tatobotys
- Species: T. janapalis

Binomial name
- Tatobotys janapalis (Walker, 1859)

Synonyms
- Botys janapalis Walker, 1859; Botys lirisalis Walker, 1859; Botys bistrigulalis Walker, [1866]; Botys cunealis Walker, [1866]; Tatobotys argillacea Butler, 1880; Lonchodes ceramochra Meyrick, 1885; Hedylepta gemella Moore, 1888; Decticogaster janapalis Shibuya, 1928

= Tatobotys janapalis =

Species of moth

Tatobotys janapalis is a moth in the family Crambidae. It was described by Francis Walker in 1859. It is found in Japan, Taiwan, Sri Lanka, India, Myanmar, Borneo, Indonesia (Moluccas, Seram) the Solomon Islands. It is also found in Australia, where it has been recorded from Queensland and New South Wales.
