= Steniodes =

Scientific classification
- Kingdom: Animalia
- Phylum: Arthropoda
- Class: Insecta
- Order: Lepidoptera
- Family: Crambidae
- Subfamily: Spilomelinae
- Genus: Steniodes; Snellen, 1875

Synonyms
- Heringiella Berg, 1898; Heringia Hedemann, 1894; Scaeocerandra Meyrick, 1936

Genus of moths

Steniodes is a genus of moths of the family Crambidae described by Snellen in 1875.

== Species ==
- Steniodes acuminalis (Dyar, 1914)
- Steniodes costipunctalis Snellen, 1899
- Steniodes declivalis (Dyar, 1914)
- Steniodes deltoidalis (Snellen, 1875)
- Steniodes dominicalis Schaus, 1924
- Steniodes gelliasalis (Walker, 1859)
- Steniodes mendica (Hedemann, 1894)
- Steniodes nennuisalis (Schaus, 1924)
- Steniodes suspensa (Meyrick, 1936)
