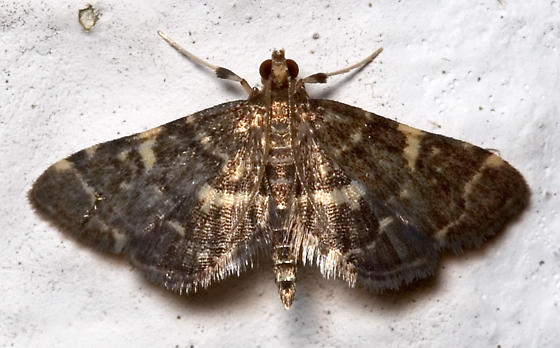

Scientific classification
- Kingdom: Animalia
- Phylum: Arthropoda
- Class: Insecta
- Order: Lepidoptera
- Family: Crambidae
- Subfamily: Spilomelinae
- Genus: Anageshna; Munroe, 1956
- Species: A. primordialis

Binomial name
- Anageshna primordialis (Dyar, 1907)

Synonyms
- Anageshna primordialis vividior Munroe, 1956; Anageshna primordialis pallidior Munroe, 1956

= Anageshna =

Genus of moths

Anageshna is a monotypic moth genus of the family Crambidae described by Eugene G. Munroe in 1956. Its only species, Anageshna primordialis, the yellow-spotted webworm, was described by Harrison Gray Dyar Jr. in 1907. It is found in the US states of Alabama, Arkansas, Arizona, Florida, Georgia, Iowa, Illinois, Kansas, Louisiana, Massachusetts, Maryland, Maine, Minnesota, Missouri, Mississippi, North Carolina, New Hampshire, New Jersey, New York, Ohio, Oklahoma, Pennsylvania, South Carolina, Texas, Virginia and West Virginia.

The wingspan is about 11 mm (0.43 in). Adults are on wing from August to November.

Its host plants are unknown.
