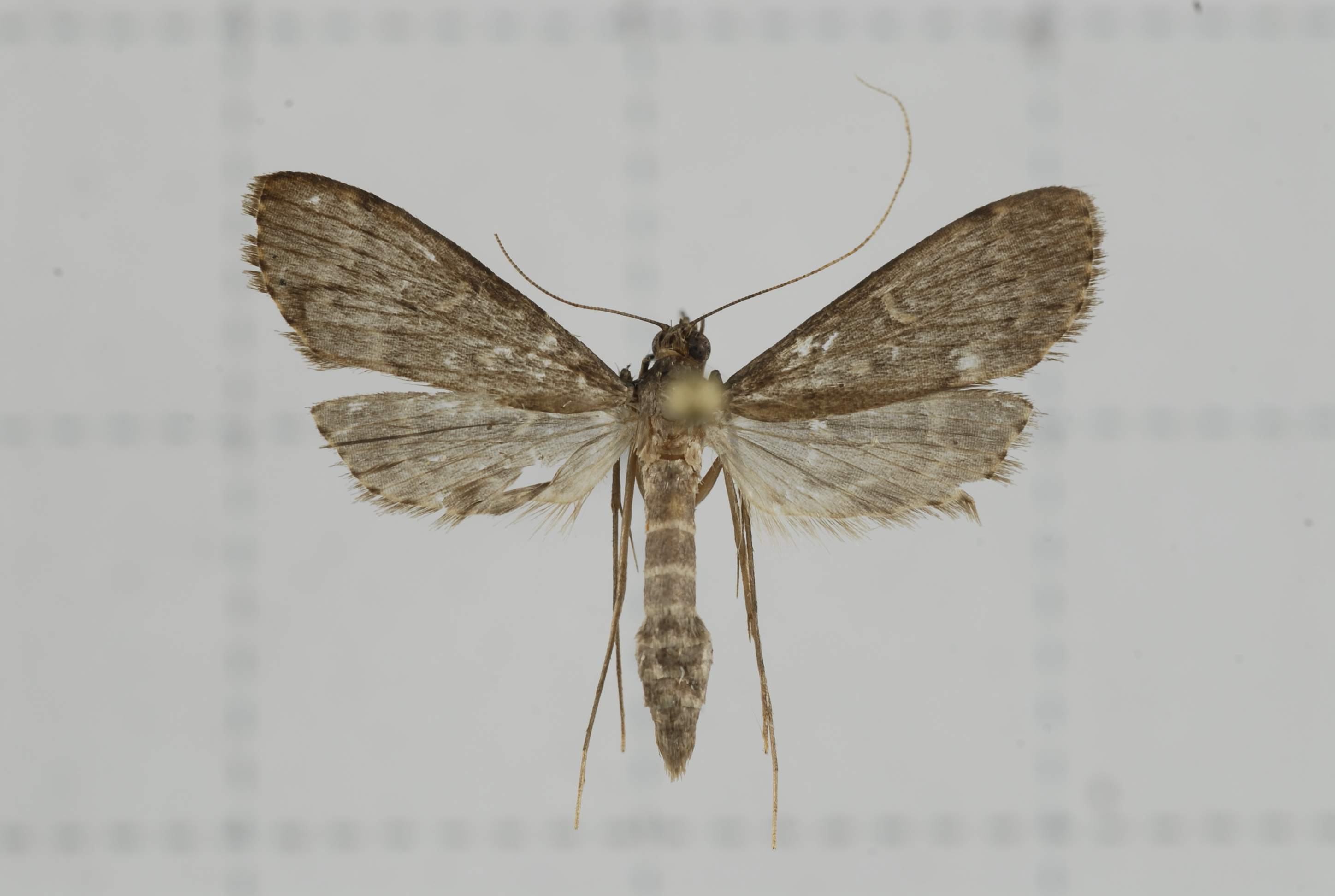

Scientific classification
- Kingdom: Animalia
- Phylum: Arthropoda
- Class: Insecta
- Order: Lepidoptera
- Family: Crambidae
- Subfamily: Spilomelinae
- Genus: Symmoracma; Meyrick, 1894
- Species: S. minoralis

Binomial name
- Symmoracma minoralis (Snellen, 1880)

Synonyms
- Auxomitia minoralis Snellen, 1880; Stenia spodinopella Strand, 1919; Strepsinoma fuliginosa Rothschild, 1915; Symmoracma spodinopa Meyrick, 1894

= Symmoracma =

Genus of moths

Symmoracma is a monotypic moth genus of the family Crambidae described by Edward Meyrick in 1894. Its only species, Symmoracma minoralis, described by Snellen in 1880, is found in Indonesia (Java, Sumbawa), Papua New Guinea, Taiwan, China and Australia, where it has been recorded from Queensland.

The wingspan is about 20 mm. The hindwings are uniform pale.
