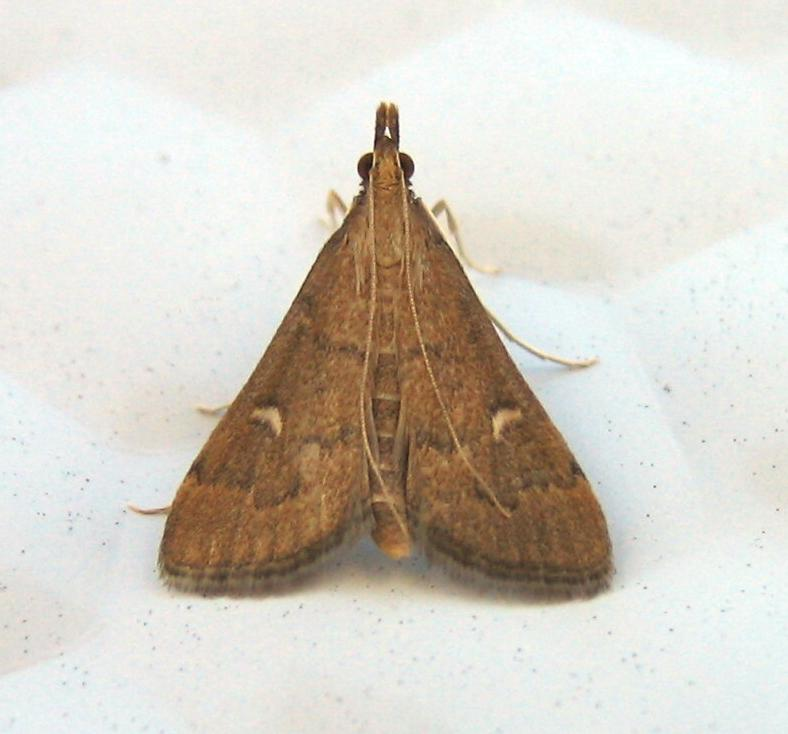
- Adult, Roussillon, France

Scientific classification
- Kingdom: Animalia
- Phylum: Arthropoda
- Class: Insecta
- Order: Lepidoptera
- Family: Crambidae
- Genus: Dolicharthria
- Species: D. punctalis

Binomial name
- Dolicharthria punctalis (Denis & Schiffermüller, 1775)

Synonyms
- Pyralis punctalis Denis & Schiffermüller, 1775; Stenia punctalis (Denis & Schiffermüller, 1775) (but see text)

= Dolicharthria punctalis =

Species of moth

Dolicharthria punctalis, the long-legged china-mark, is a species of moth of the family Crambidae. It is the type species of the proposed genus Stenia, which is usually included in Dolicharthria but may be distinct.

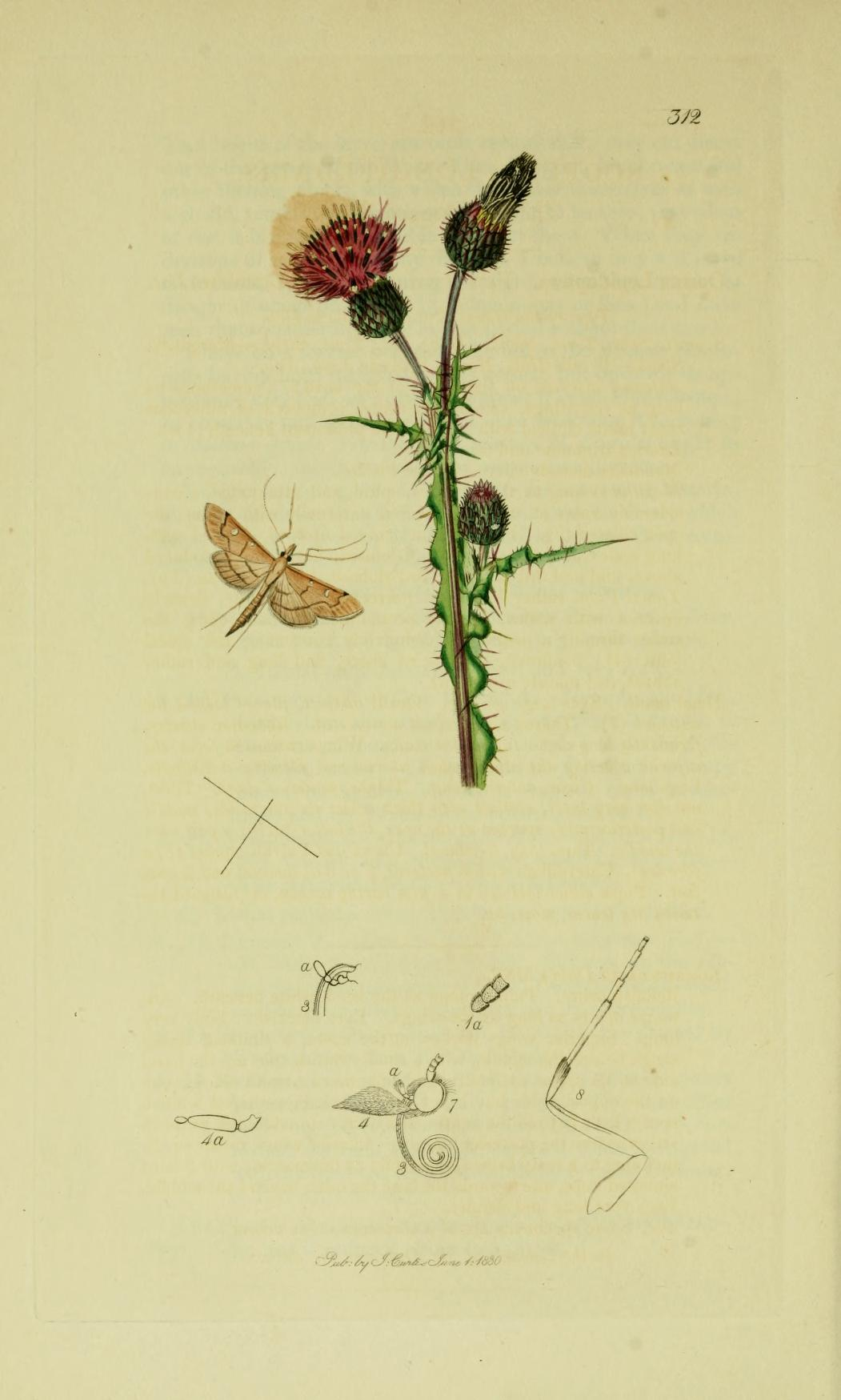
Illustration from John Curtis's British Entomology Volume 6

It is found mainly in central and southern Europe, but has been recorded further north. The wingspan is 20–25 mm. The moth flies from May to September depending on the location.

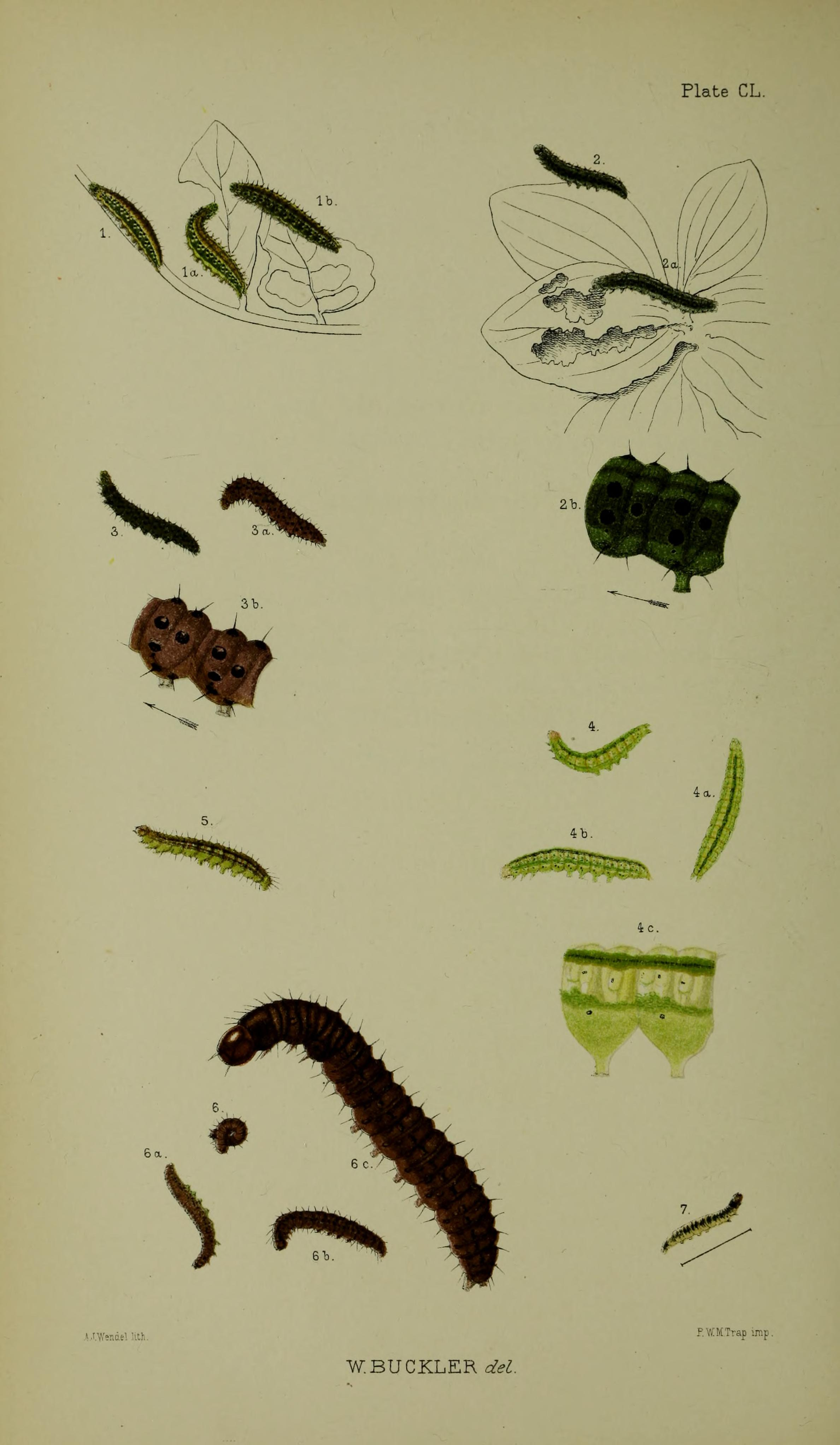
Figs 7 larva after 3rd moult

The caterpillars feed on Centaurea (knapweeds), Plantago (plantain herb), Trifolium (clovers), Artemisia vulgaris (common wormwood) and even the marine eelgrass Zostera marina. Yet other unusual recorded foods are dry leaves, plant waste, and old roots.
