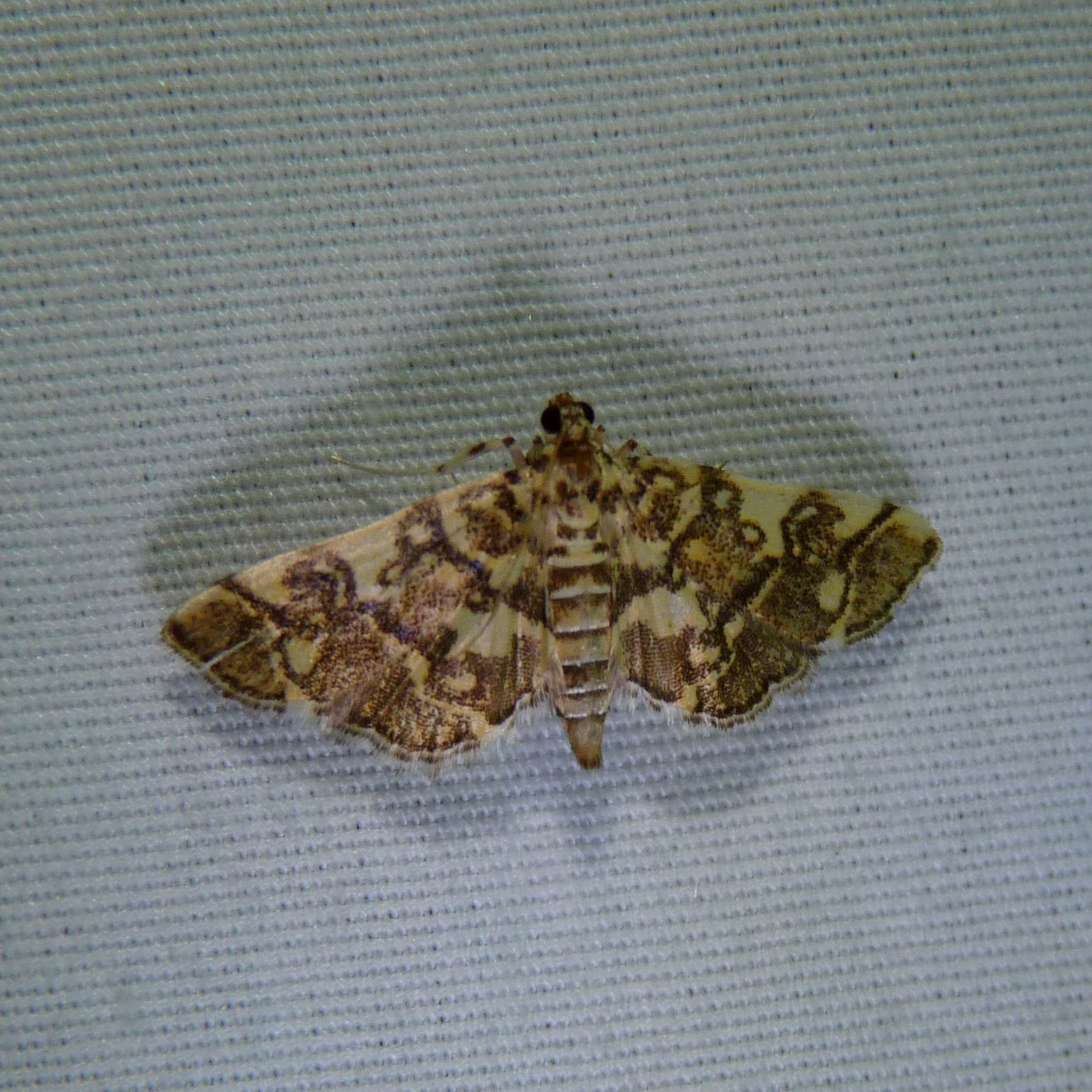
- Apogeshna (Apogeshna stenialis).

Scientific classification
- Kingdom: Animalia
- Phylum: Arthropoda
- Class: Insecta
- Order: Lepidoptera
- Family: Crambidae
- Subfamily: Spilomelinae
- Genus: Apogeshna; Munroe, 1956

Synonyms
- Euvalva Amsel, 1956

= Apogeshna =

Genus of moths

Apogeshna is a genus of moths of the family Crambidae.

== Species ==
- Apogeshna infirmalis (Möschler, 1886)
- Apogeshna stenialis (Guenée, 1854)
