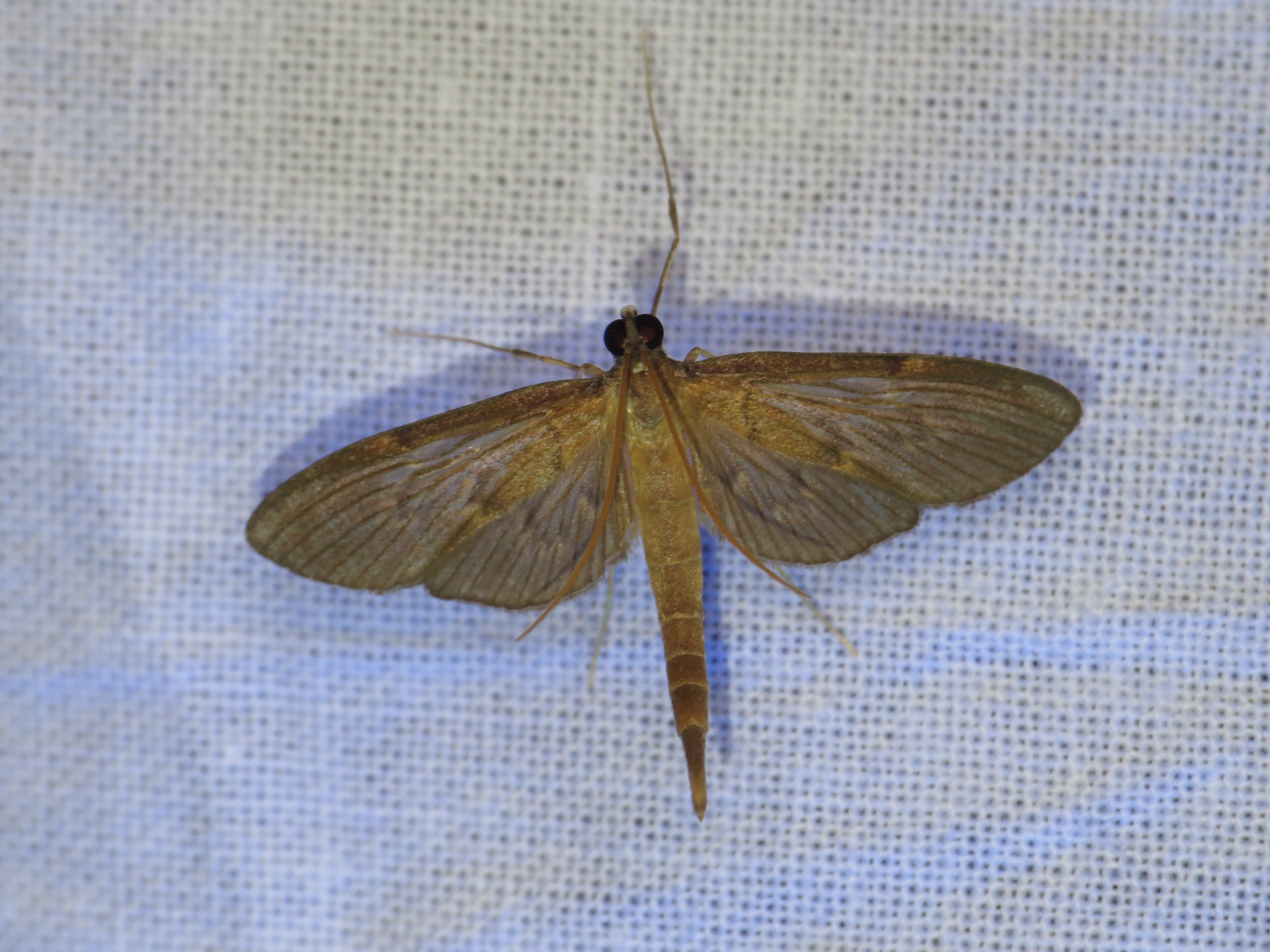
- Clump Point, Mission Beach, Queensland, Australia

Scientific classification
- Kingdom: Animalia
- Phylum: Arthropoda
- Clade: Pancrustacea
- Class: Insecta
- Order: Lepidoptera
- Family: Crambidae
- Genus: Hymenoptychis
- Species: H. sordida

Binomial name
- Hymenoptychis sordida Zeller, 1852

Synonyms
- Botys pterophoralis Walker, 1866; Hymenoptychis pterophoralis (Walker, 1866); Syrbatis tipuliformis Walker, 1863; Hymenoptychis tipuliformis (Walker, 1863)

= Hymenoptychis sordida =

Species of moth

Hymenoptychis sordida, the pneumatophore moth, is a moth of the family Crambidae. The species was first described by Philipp Christoph Zeller in 1852. It is known from Australia, southern and South-East Asia, several Pacific islands, Seychelles, South Africa, Madagascar and the United Arab Emirates.

The larvae of this species are brown and live in mangroves where they feed on vegetarian detritus. The wingspan is about 25 mm.

Known food plants are Acanthaceae (Avicennia marina and Avicennia sp.).
