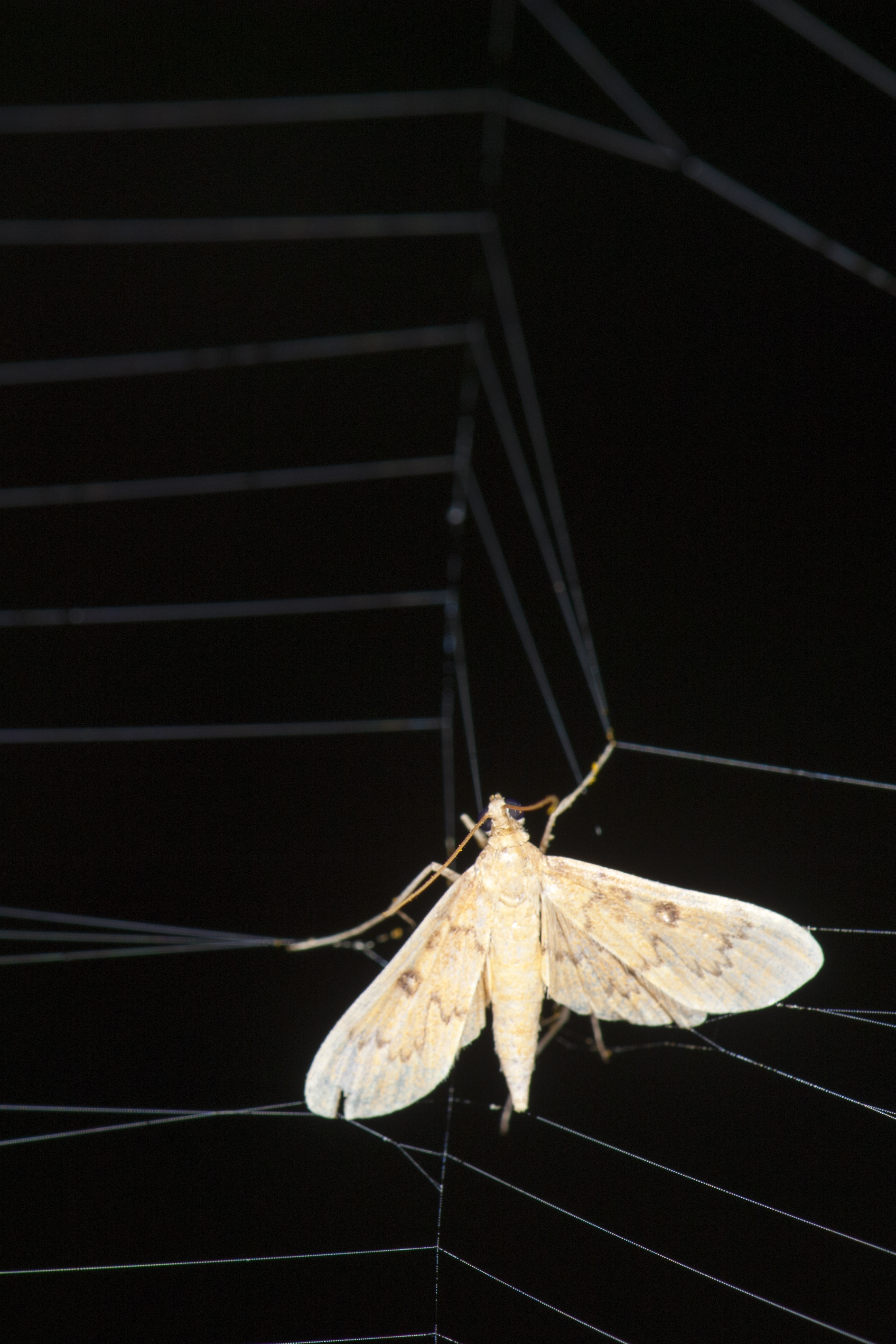
- Tatobotys janapalis

Scientific classification
- Kingdom: Animalia
- Phylum: Arthropoda
- Class: Insecta
- Order: Lepidoptera
- Family: Crambidae
- Subfamily: Spilomelinae
- Genus: Tatobotys; Butler, 1881

Synonyms
- Cometura Meyrick, 1886

= Tatobotys =

Genus of moths

Tatobotys is a genus of moths of the family Crambidae described by Arthur Gardiner Butler in 1881.

== Species ==
- Tatobotys africana (Ghesquière, 1942)
- Tatobotys albivenalis Hampson, 1897
- Tatobotys angustalis Caradja & Meyrick, 1933
- Tatobotys aurantialis Hampson, 1897
- Tatobotys biannulalis Walker, 1866
- Tatobotys depalpalis Strand, 1919
- Tatobotys janapalis (Walker, 1859)
- Tatobotys tanyscia West, 1931
- Tatobotys varanesalis (Walker, 1859)
- Tatobotys vibrata Meyrick, 1929

== Former species ==
- Tatobotys amoyalis Caradja, 1932
- Tatobotys picrogramma (Meyrick, 1886)
