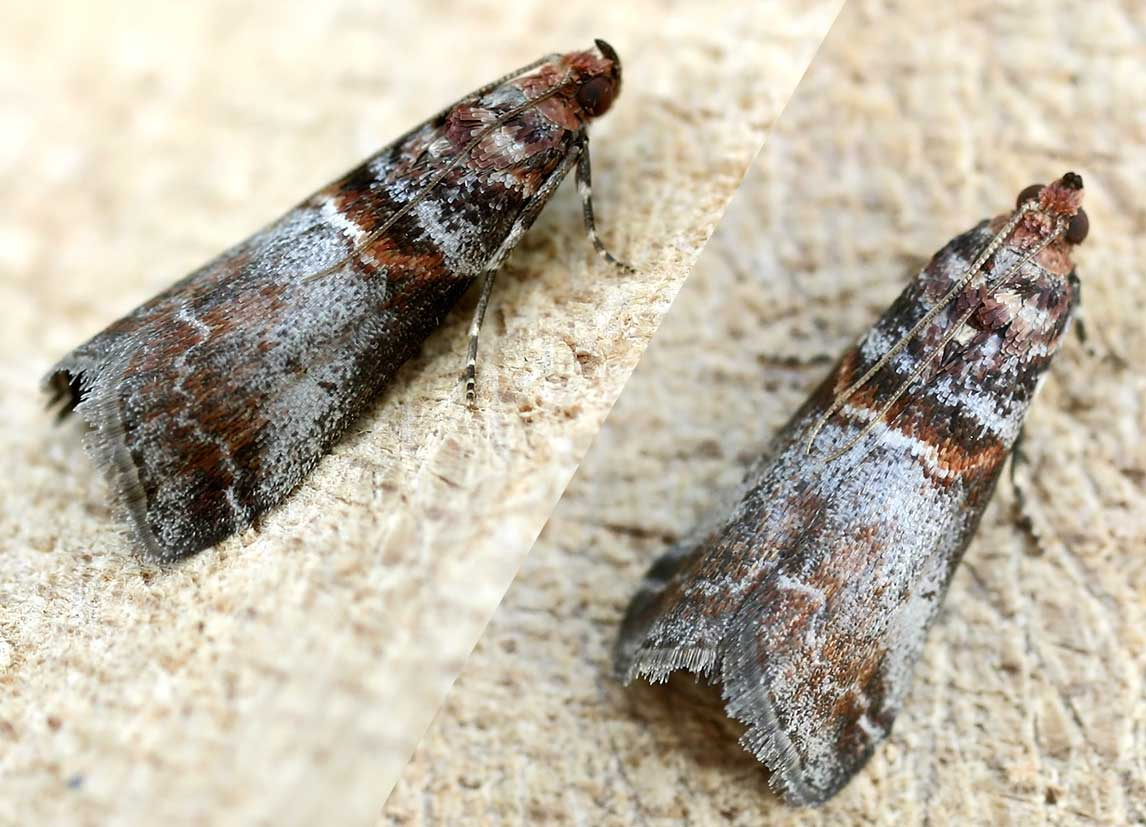

Scientific classification
- Kingdom: Animalia
- Phylum: Arthropoda
- Clade: Pancrustacea
- Class: Insecta
- Order: Lepidoptera
- Family: Pyralidae
- Genus: Acrobasis
- Species: A. advenella

Binomial name
- Acrobasis advenella Zincken, 1818

Synonyms
- Phycis advenella Zincken, 1818; Trachycera advenella; Phycis consociella Duponchel, 1836; Phycis rhenella Stephens, 1834; Rhodophaea recurvella Guenée, 1845

= Acrobasis advenella =

Species of moth

Acrobasis advenella is a species of snout moth in the genus Acrobasis. It was described by Johann Zincken in 1818 and is found in most of Europe. They have an oligophagous diet primarily feeding on plants from the Rosaceae family including the black chokeberry (Aronia melanocarpa). They cause significant damage to organic chokeberry farming, due to their widespread impact on the quality and quantity of the black chokeberry plants.

The wingspan is 17–24 mm.Similar to Acrobasis suavella. but the an area on the dorsal half of the forewing enclosed by the sub-basal line and pre median line is more sharply defined in A. advenella The red scales, mixed with black and white, enclosed by this area cover the basal area, thorax and head of A. advenella to a lesser extent than in A. suavella which has a grey head.The discal spots differ in position. Meyrick describes it - Head and front of thorax ferruginous-reddish. Forewings brownish-ochreous, none or less mixed or suffused with reddish and dark fuscous; lines slender, obscurely whitish, first bent, preceded by a straight whitish line joining it near costa, space between them reddish suffused anteriorly with dark fuscous, second darker-edged; a broad fascia of grey-whitish irroration from costa before second line to lower extremity of first, including two obliquely placed darker discal dots; some whitish irroration towards termen. Hindwings fuscous.Larva light green; subdorsal line purplish-pink; head pale brown: in a silken gallery amongst flowers and leaves of hawthorn and Pyrus; 5, 6.

The moth flies in one generation from July to August..

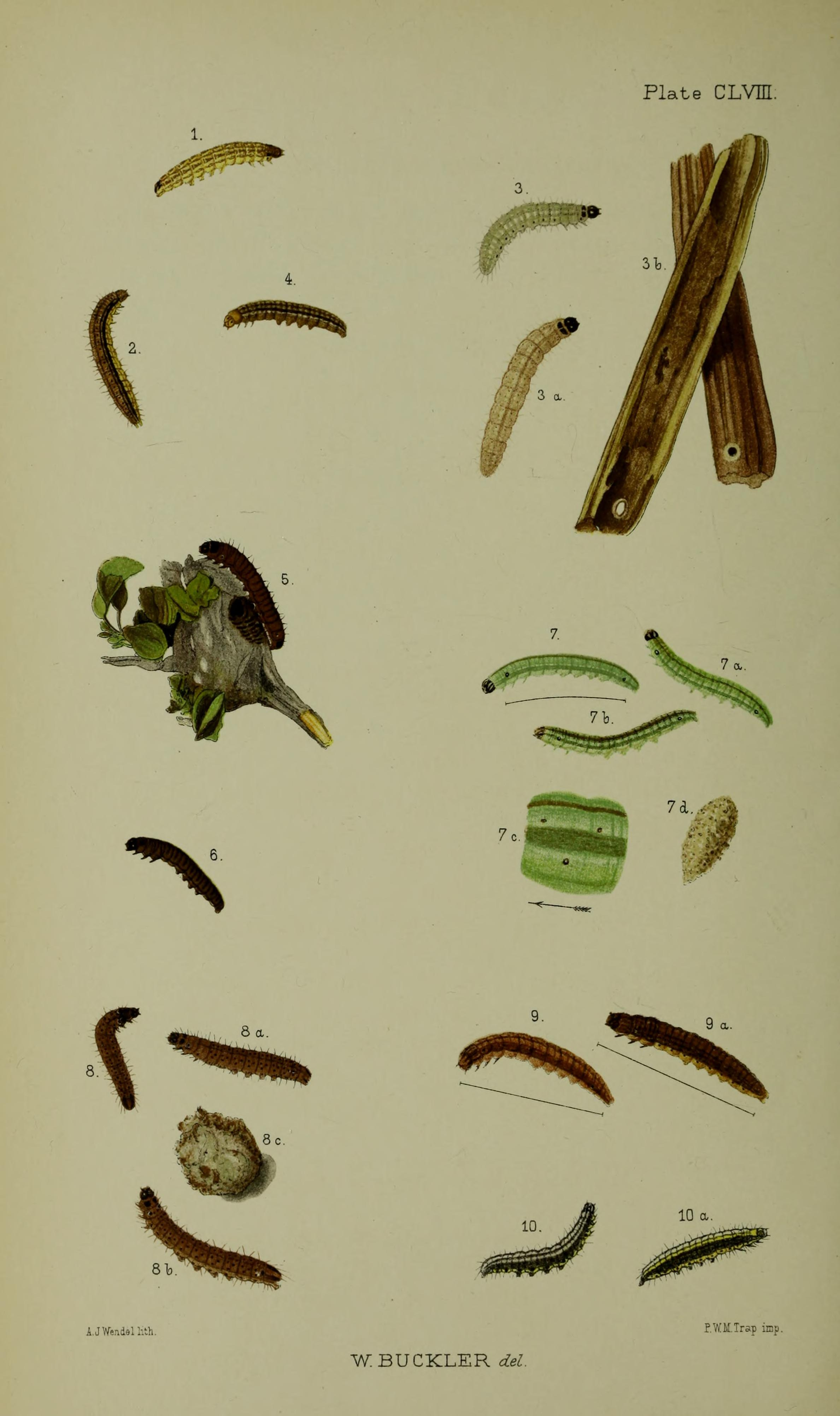
Fig. 4 larva after final moult

The larvae feed on Crataegus, Pyrus and Sorbus aucuparia.

== Notes ==
1. The flight season refers to Belgium and the Netherlands. This may vary in other parts of the range.
