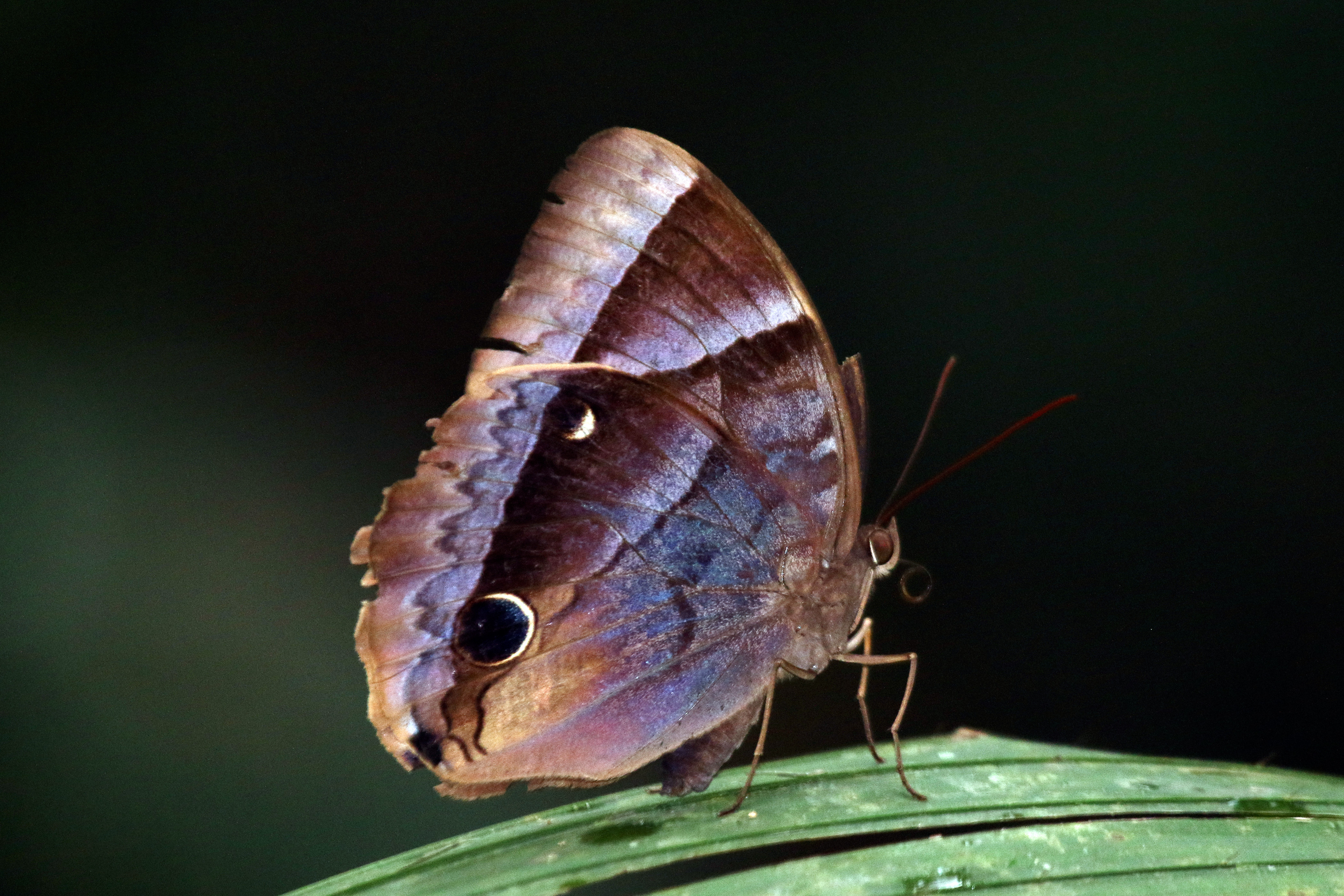

Scientific classification
- Domain: Eukaryota
- Kingdom: Animalia
- Phylum: Arthropoda
- Class: Insecta
- Order: Lepidoptera
- Family: Nymphalidae
- Genus: Thaumantis
- Species: T. klugius

Binomial name
- Thaumantis klugius (Zinken, 1831)

Synonyms
- Morpho klugius Zinken, 1831; Thaumantis lucipor Westwood, 1851; Thaumantis lucipor candika Fruhstorfer, 1905

= Thaumantis klugius =

Species of butterfly

Thaumantis klugius is a butterfly in the family Nymphalidae. It was described by Johann Zincken in 1831. It is found in the Indomalayan realm.

== Subspecies ==
- T. k. klugius (Borneo, Java)
- T. k. lucipor Westwood, 1851 (Peninsular Malaya, Singapore)
- T. k. candika (Fruhstorfer, 1905) (Sumatra)

== Etymology ==
The name honours Johann Christoph Friedrich Klug.
