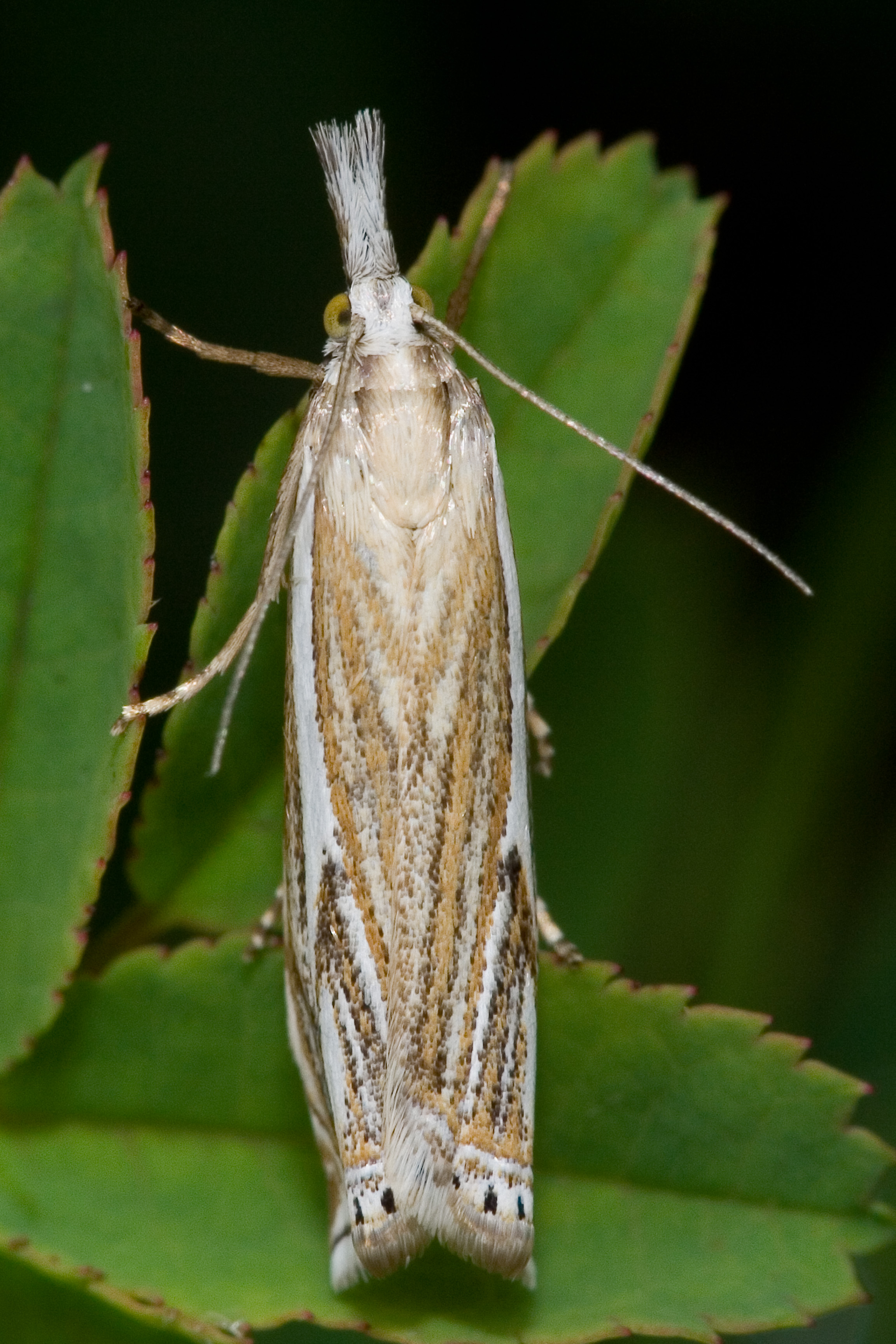

Scientific classification
- Kingdom: Animalia
- Phylum: Arthropoda
- Clade: Pancrustacea
- Class: Insecta
- Order: Lepidoptera
- Family: Crambidae
- Genus: Crambus
- Species: C. lathoniellus

Binomial name
- Crambus lathoniellus Zincken, 1817

Synonyms
- Chilo lathoniellus Zincken, 1817; Crambus nemorellus; Crambus pratellus sensu auct nec Linnaeus; Crambus lathoniellus alfacarellus Staudinger, 1859; Crambus angustellus Stephens, 1834; Crambus frassicola Réal, 1988; Crambus pratellus var. altivolens Schawerda, 1913; Tinea nemorella Hübner, 1813; Argyroteuchia nemoralis Hübner, 1825

= Crambus lathoniellus =

Species of moth

Crambus lathoniellus is a species of moth of the family Crambidae described by Johann Leopold Theodor Friedrich Zincken in 1817. It is found in Europe, Central and South-East Asia.

The wingspan is about 20 millimetres (0.79 in). In this Crambus a white longitudinal stripe emanates From the wing base ending sharply at an obliquely running dark line. In some specimens a white spot is formed in continuation and up to the submarginal line. The longitudinal strip has behind the center (seen from the base), closer to the submarginal line a "tooth" facing outwards and to the inner edge. Meyrick - Forewings with apex somewhat produced; brown, sometimes ochreous-mixed, in male with grey, in female with whitish blackish-edged interneural streaks; a subcostal white streak on basal half; a white median streak, upper edge straight, lower edge projecting in middle, cut by sharply angulated dark brown median line; second line angulated, white, edged with dark brown, preceded by white costal mark; a white terminal streak, with several black dots; cilia metallic. Hindwings rather dark grey.

Larva greenish-grey or brownish-grey; dots darker; head brown, darker-marked: in silken galleries above or among roots of grasses.

The moth flies from May to September depending on the location.

The larvae feed on various grasses.

== Subspecies ==
- Crambus lathoniellus lathoniellus (Europe, Asia Minor, Transcaucasus to Central Asia to Amur)
- Crambus lathoniellus alfacarellus Staudinger, 1859 (Spain)
- Crambus lathoniellus altivolens Schawerda, 1913 (Yugoslavia)
