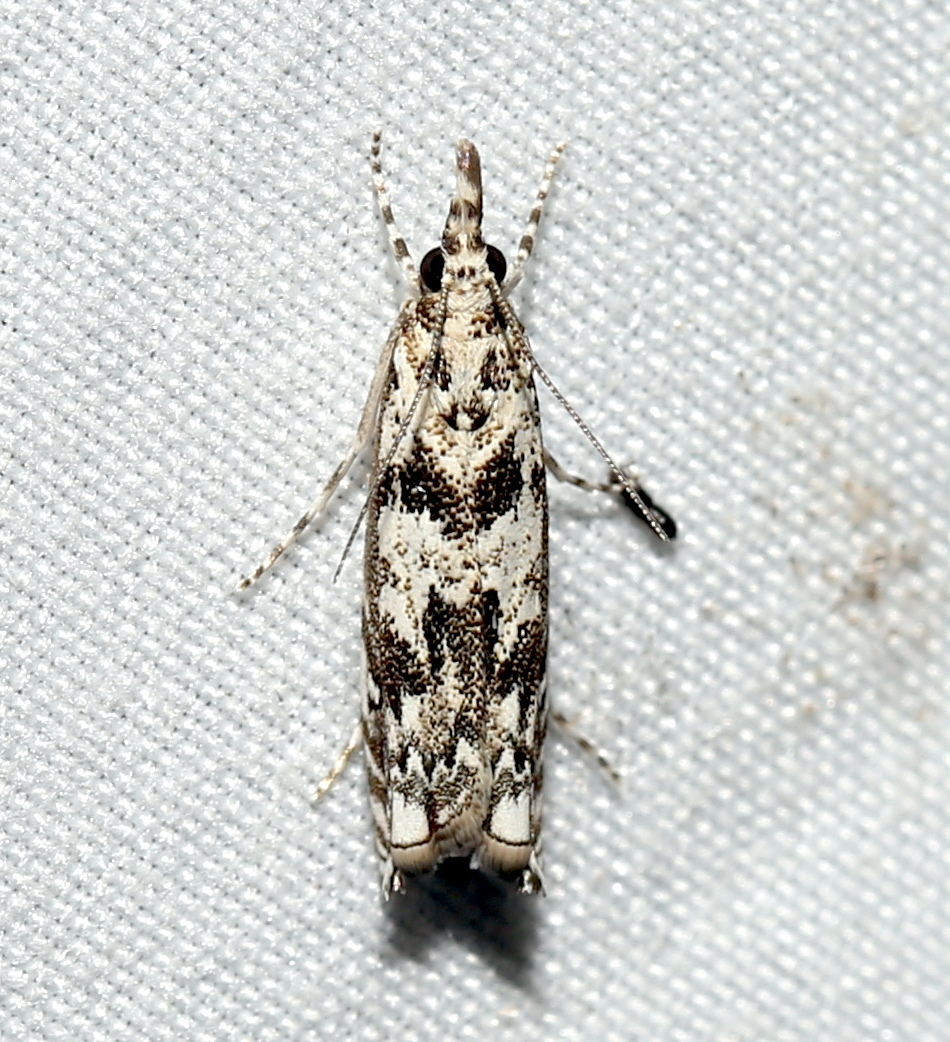

Scientific classification
- Kingdom: Animalia
- Phylum: Arthropoda
- Class: Insecta
- Order: Lepidoptera
- Family: Crambidae
- Subfamily: Crambinae
- Tribe: Ancylolomiini
- Genus: Mesolia
- Species: M. incertellus

Binomial name
- Mesolia incertellus (Zincken, 1821)

Synonyms
- Chilo incertellus Zincken, 1821; Mesolia incertella; Eugrotea dentella Fernald, 1896; Prionopteryx olivella Grote, 1881

= Mesolia incertellus =

Species of moth

Mesolia incertellus is a moth in the family Crambidae. It was described by Johann Leopold Theodor Friedrich Zincken in 1821. It is found in North America, where it has been recorded from Florida, Georgia, South Carolina and Illinois.

The wingspan is about 17–21 mm. Adults have been recorded on wing nearly year round in Florida.
