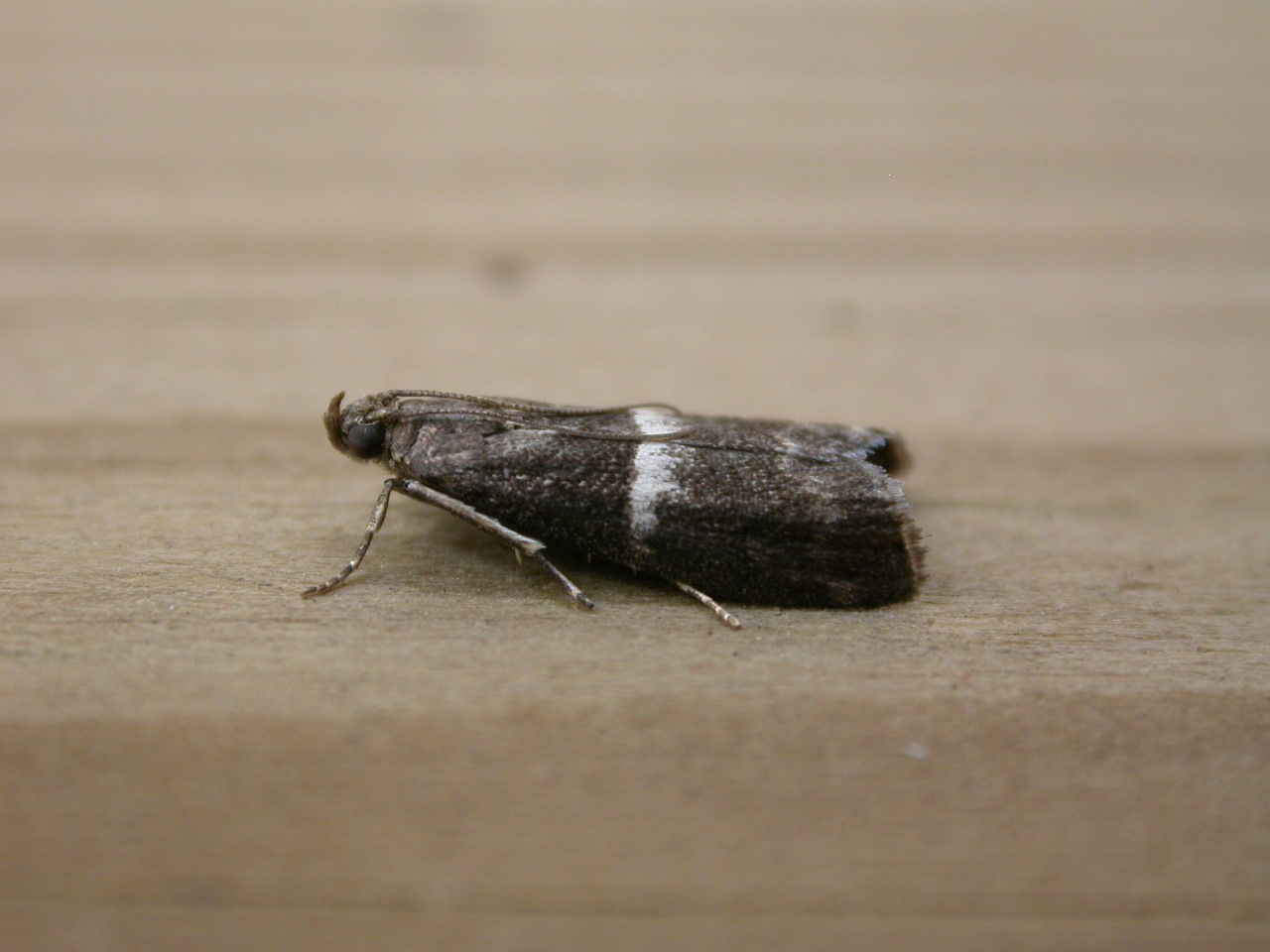

Scientific classification
- Kingdom: Animalia
- Phylum: Arthropoda
- Class: Insecta
- Order: Lepidoptera
- Family: Pyralidae
- Genus: Elegia
- Species: E. similella

Binomial name
- Elegia similella (Zincken, 1818)

Synonyms
- Phycis similella Zincken, 1818

= Elegia similella =

Species of moth

Elegia similella is a moth of the family Pyralidae. It was described by Johann Leopold Theodor Friedrich Zincken in 1818 and is known from most of Europe. The habitat consists of old, mature woodland and parkland.

The wingspan is 19–22 mm. They are on wing from June to July and are usually found high up in the trees.

The larvae feed on oaks (Quercus species).
