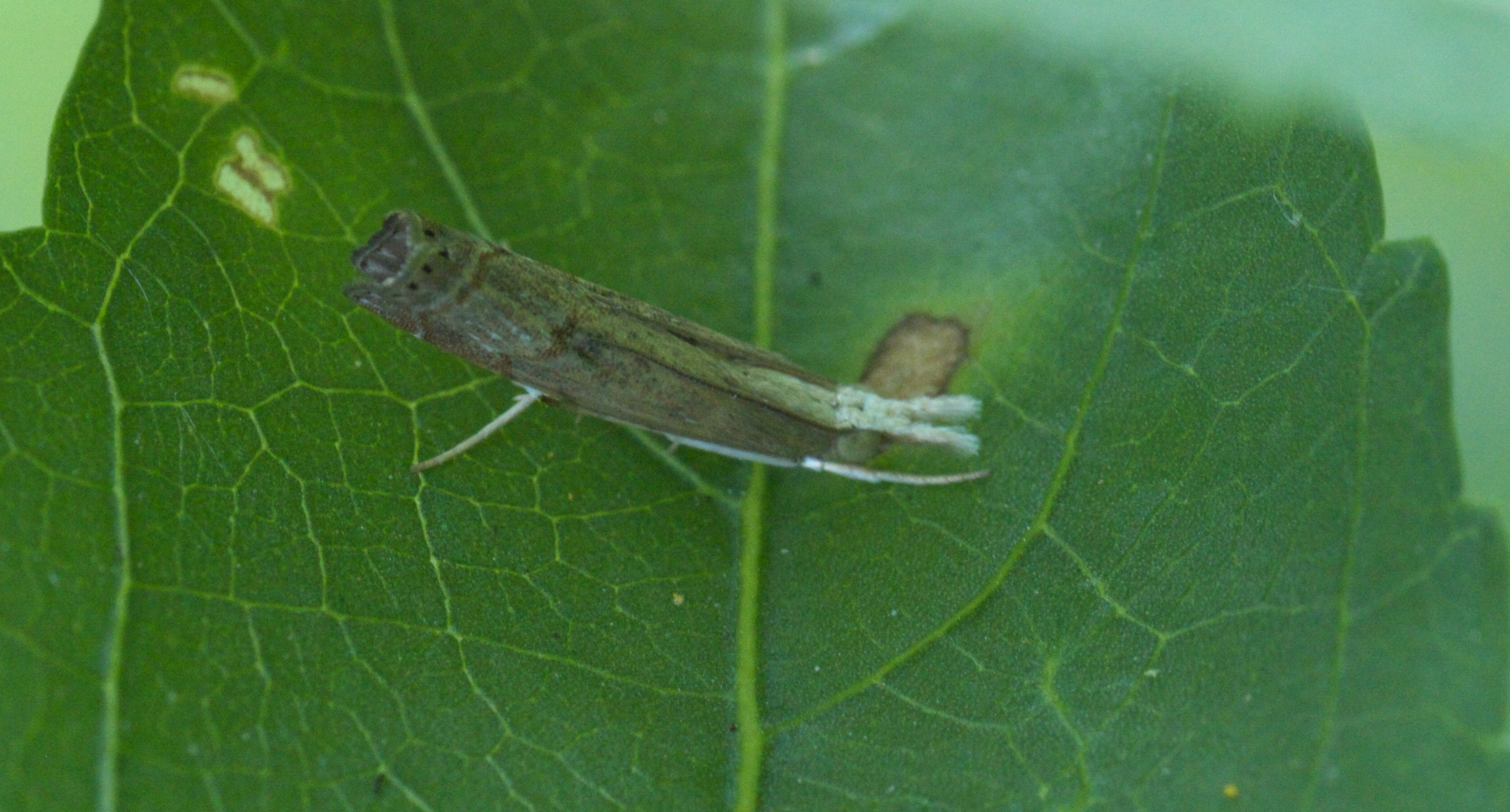

Scientific classification
- Domain: Eukaryota
- Kingdom: Animalia
- Phylum: Arthropoda
- Class: Insecta
- Order: Lepidoptera
- Family: Crambidae
- Subfamily: Crambinae
- Tribe: Crambini
- Genus: Parapediasia
- Species: P. decorellus

Binomial name
- Parapediasia decorellus (Zincken, 1821)

Synonyms
- Chilo decorellus Zincken, 1821; Crambus bonusculalis Hulst, 1886; Crambus goodellianus Grote, 1880; Crambus goodelianus Bleszynski & Collins, 1962; Crambus polyactinellus Zeller, 1863

= Parapediasia decorellus =

Species of moth

Parapediasia decorellus, the graceful grass-veneer, is a moth in the family Crambidae. It was described by Zincken in 1821. It is found in North America, where it has been recorded from Alabama, Arkansas, Florida, Georgia, Illinois, Kansas, Maine, Maryland, Massachusetts, Missouri, New Hampshire, New Jersey, New Mexico, North Carolina, Ohio, Oklahoma, South Carolina, Tennessee and Texas.
