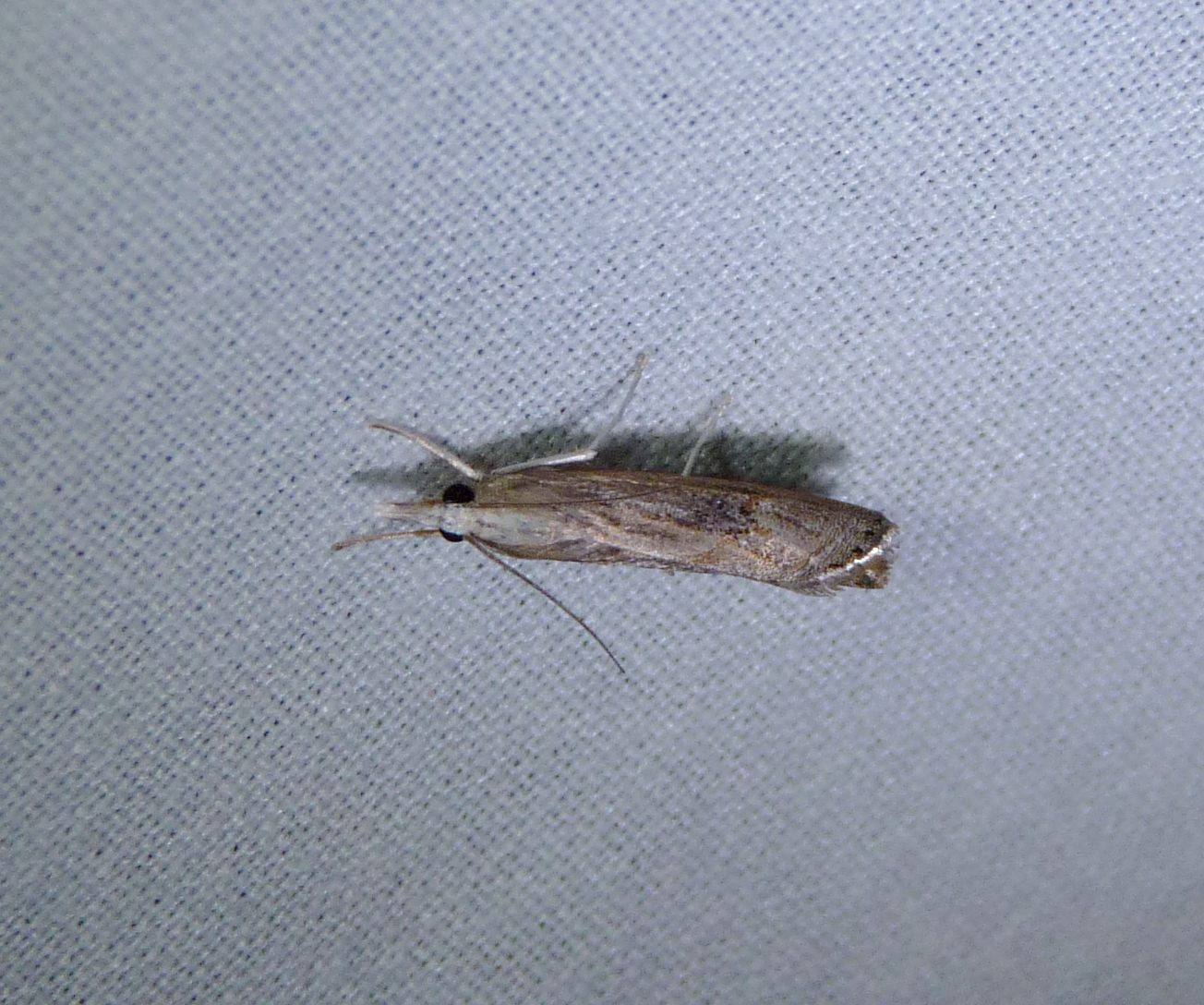

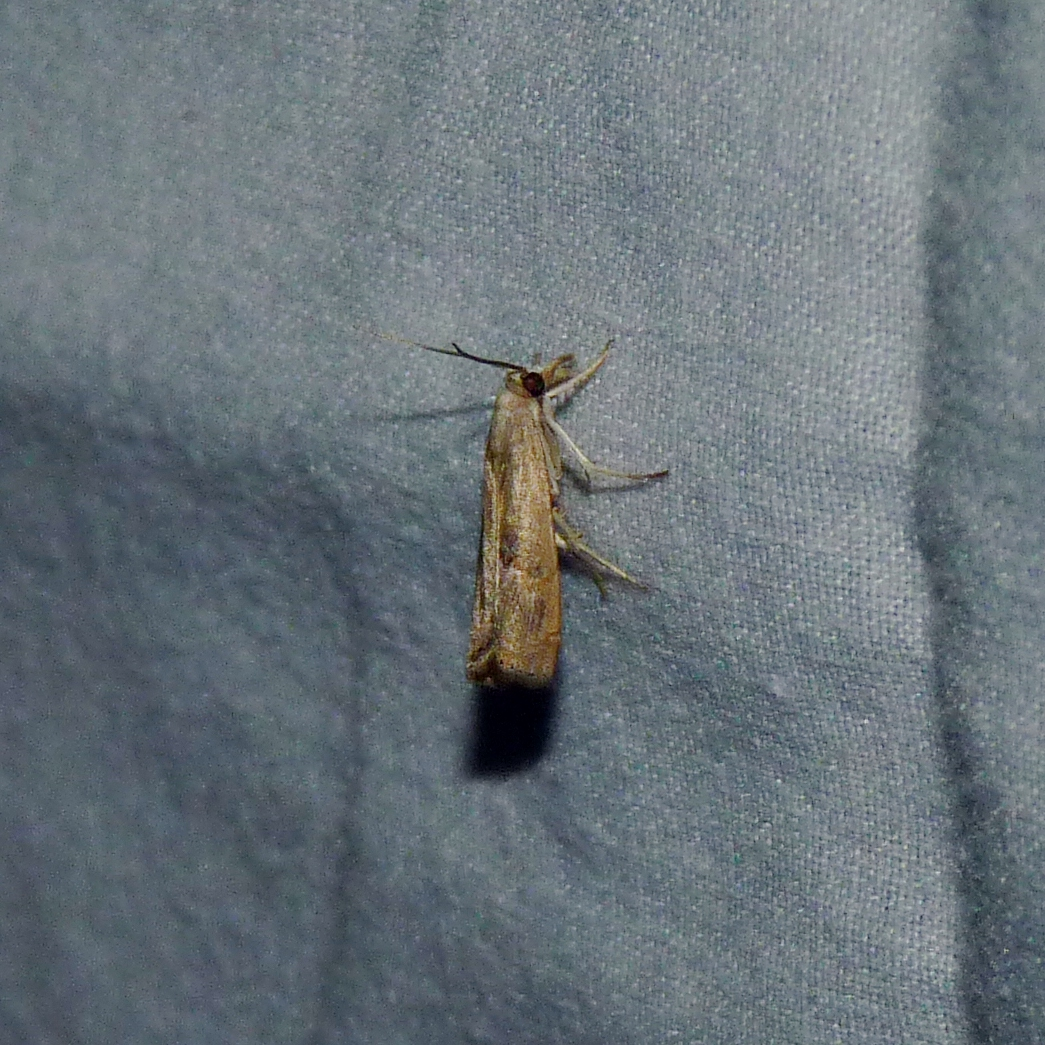

Scientific classification
- Kingdom: Animalia
- Phylum: Arthropoda
- Clade: Pancrustacea
- Class: Insecta
- Order: Lepidoptera
- Family: Crambidae
- Subfamily: Crambinae
- Tribe: Crambini
- Genus: Parapediasia
- Species: P. teterrellus

Binomial name
- Parapediasia teterrellus (Zincken, 1821)

Synonyms
- Chilo teterrellus Zincken, 1821; Crambus camurellus Clemens, 1860; Parapediasia camurella; Crambus terrellus Zeller, 1863; Parapediasia terrella

= Parapediasia teterrellus =

Species of moth

Parapediasia teterrellus, the bluegrass webworm moth, bluegrass webworm, bluegrass sod webworm moth or bluegrass sod webworm, is a moth of the family Crambidae.

The wingspan is about 21 mm. Adults are on wing from May to October in two generations per year.

The larvae feed on Poa species, Festuca arundinacea and occasionally Cynodon dactylon.

Parapediasia teterrellus was first described in 1821 from Georgia, one of the first pyralid moths recorded in North America. Its geographic distribution has been affected by the human colonization of North America. By the late 1800s, Parapediasia teterrellus encompassed the midwestern United States. It was recorded in Albuquerque, NM and Tucson, AZ in 1935-1940, Los Angeles in 1954, and the San Francisco Bay area in 1988. It has effectively replaced its lawn moth competitors Tehama bonifatella and Crambus sperryellus in urban areas.

Parapediasia teterrellus is currently found in North America from Ontario and New England to Florida, west to California and north to Nebraska. It has also been introduced to Japan and eastern China, where it is an invasive species.

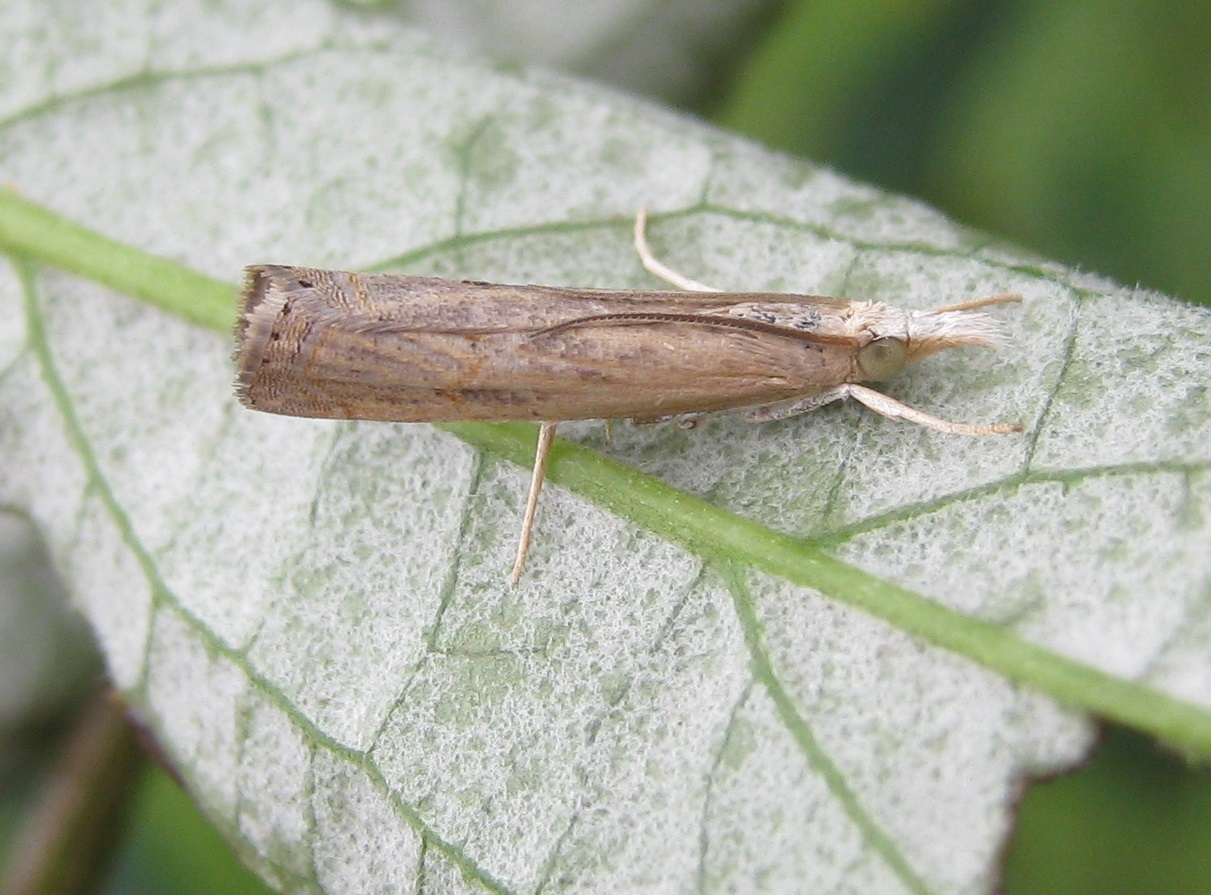
P. teterrellus
