= Mesolia rectilineella =

Scientific classification
- Kingdom: Animalia
- Phylum: Arthropoda
- Class: Insecta
- Order: Lepidoptera
- Family: Crambidae
- Subfamily: Crambinae
- Tribe: Ancylolomiini
- Genus: Mesolia
- Species: M. rectilineella

Binomial name
- Mesolia rectilineella Hampson, 1899

Species of moth

Mesolia rectilineella is a moth in the family Crambidae. It was described by George Hampson in 1899. It is found in the Punjab region of what was British India.
