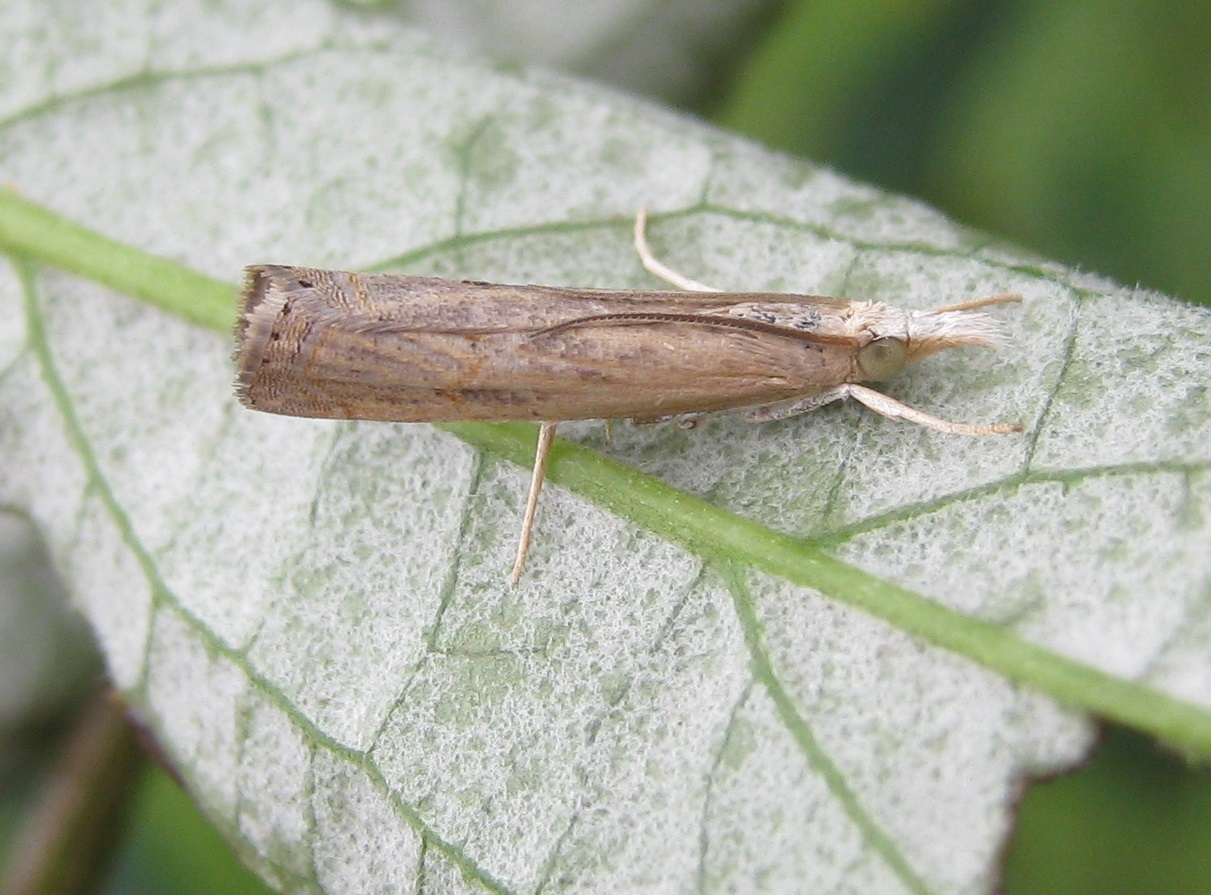

Scientific classification
- Kingdom: Animalia
- Phylum: Arthropoda
- Clade: Pancrustacea
- Class: Insecta
- Order: Lepidoptera
- Family: Crambidae
- Tribe: Crambini
- Genus: Parapediasia; Bleszynski, 1966

Synonyms
- Parapediasia Bleszynski, 1963

= Parapediasia =

Genus of moths

Parapediasia is a genus of moths of the family Crambidae.

This is a relatively small genus known to contain 12 species described from the Western Hemisphere (Nuss et al., 2024), i.e., the United States of America, the Antilles, Colombia, and Brazil. Only Parapediasia teterrellus (Zincken, 1821) has been reported from outside its region of origin, i.e., in the Canary Islands, China and Japan, where it is considered invasive .

Larval host plants are known for Parapediasia teterrellus, an economically important turf grass moth known as the bluegrass webworm, and Parapediasia decorellus ( Zincken, 1821) , both reared on Poaceae.

== Species ==
- Parapediasia atalanta (Bleszynski, 1963) (from Brazil)
- Parapediasia cervinellus (Zeller, 1863) (from Brazil)
- Parapediasia bolterella (Fernald, 1887)
- Parapediasia decorellus (Zincken, 1821)
- Parapediasia detomatellus (Möschler, 1890)
- Parapediasia hulstellus (Fernald, 1885)
- Parapediasia ligonellus (Zeller, 1881) (from Jamaica)
- Parapediasia murinellus (Zeller, 1863) (from Brazil, Säo Paulo; Castro Parana)
- Parapediasia paranella (Bleszynski, 1963) (from Brazil)
- Parapediasia subtilellus (Zeller, 1863) (from Paraguay, Brazil)
- Parapediasia tenuistrigatus (Zeller, 1881) (from Colombia)
- Parapediasia teterrellus (Zincken, 1821)
- Parapediasia torquatella B. Landry, 1995
