= Elegia southi =

Scientific classification
- Domain: Eukaryota
- Kingdom: Animalia
- Phylum: Arthropoda
- Class: Insecta
- Order: Lepidoptera
- Family: Pyralidae
- Genus: Elegia
- Species: E. southi

Binomial name
- Elegia southi (West, 1932)

Synonyms
- Phycita southi West, 1931; Cryptoblabes southi

Species of moth

Elegia southi is a species of moth of the family Pyralidae. It was described by Reginald James West in 1932 and is found in Taiwan.
