= Parapediasia atalanta =

Scientific classification
- Domain: Eukaryota
- Kingdom: Animalia
- Phylum: Arthropoda
- Class: Insecta
- Order: Lepidoptera
- Family: Crambidae
- Subfamily: Crambinae
- Tribe: Crambini
- Genus: Parapediasia
- Species: P. atalanta

Binomial name
- Parapediasia atalanta Błeszyński, 1963

Species of moth

Parapediasia atalanta is a moth in the family Crambidae. It was described by Stanisław Błeszyński in 1963. It is found in Brazil.
