= Elegia omichleuta =

Scientific classification
- Kingdom: Animalia
- Phylum: Arthropoda
- Class: Insecta
- Order: Lepidoptera
- Family: Pyralidae
- Genus: Elegia
- Species: E. omichleuta

Binomial name
- Elegia omichleuta (Meyrick, 1934)

Synonyms
- Microthrix omichleuta Meyrick, 1934

Species of moth

Elegia omichleuta is a species of moth of the family Pyralidae. It was described by Edward Meyrick in 1934 and is found in Sudan.
