= Parapediasia tenuistrigatus =

Scientific classification
- Kingdom: Animalia
- Phylum: Arthropoda
- Clade: Pancrustacea
- Class: Insecta
- Order: Lepidoptera
- Family: Crambidae
- Subfamily: Crambinae
- Tribe: Crambini
- Genus: Parapediasia
- Species: P. tenuistrigatus

Binomial name
- Parapediasia tenuistrigatus (Zeller, 1881)

Synonyms
- Crambus tenuistrigatus Zeller, 1881

Species of moth

Parapediasia tenuistrigatus is a moth in the family Crambidae. It was described by Zeller in 1881. It is found in Colombia and Honduras.
