= Mesolia pandavella =

Scientific classification
- Domain: Eukaryota
- Kingdom: Animalia
- Phylum: Arthropoda
- Class: Insecta
- Order: Lepidoptera
- Family: Crambidae
- Subfamily: Crambinae
- Tribe: Ancylolomiini
- Genus: Mesolia
- Species: M. pandavella

Binomial name
- Mesolia pandavella Ragonot in de Joannis & Ragonot, 1889

Species of moth

Mesolia pandavella is a moth in the family Crambidae. It was described by Émile Louis Ragonot in 1889. It is found in India and Sri Lanka.

== Description ==
The wingspan is about 18 mm in the male and 22 mm in the female. In the male, the body is dark reddish brown irrorated (sprinkled) with fuscous. The forewings with diffused whitish fascia from the base yellow median nervure to outer margin. A brown medial line with white inner edge, oblique from costa to vein 4 and then angled and dentate inwards on vein 2. A white line across the apical area angled on the margin at vein 6, then dentate. A sinuous white line across apex. Cilia with a dark line though them from costa to the indentation. Hindwings whitish. Female much browner, with hardly a trace of the pale fascia on forewings.
