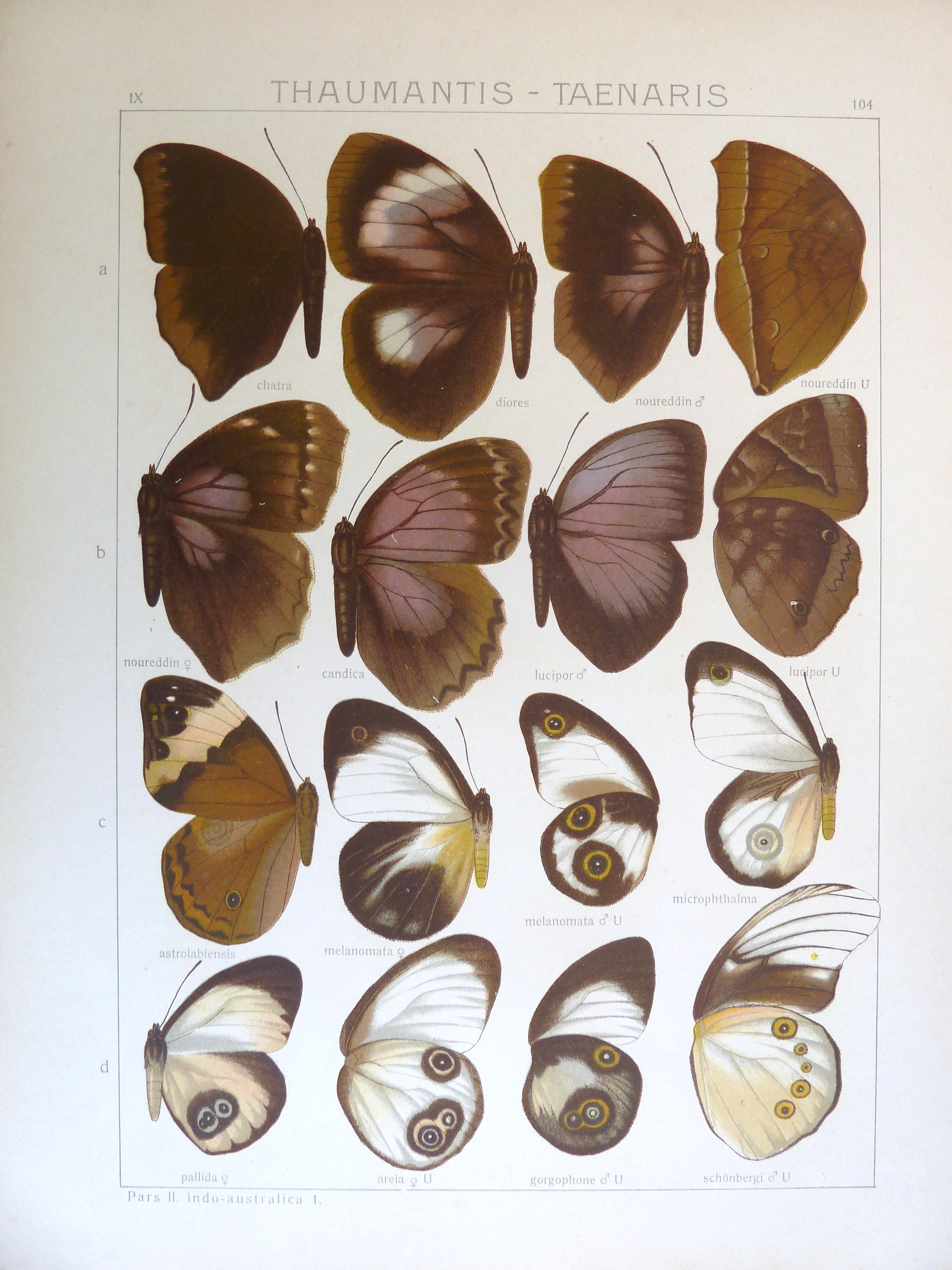
- Thaumantis noureddin noureddin and T. n. chatra from Adalbert Seitz's Die Großschmetterlinge der Erde
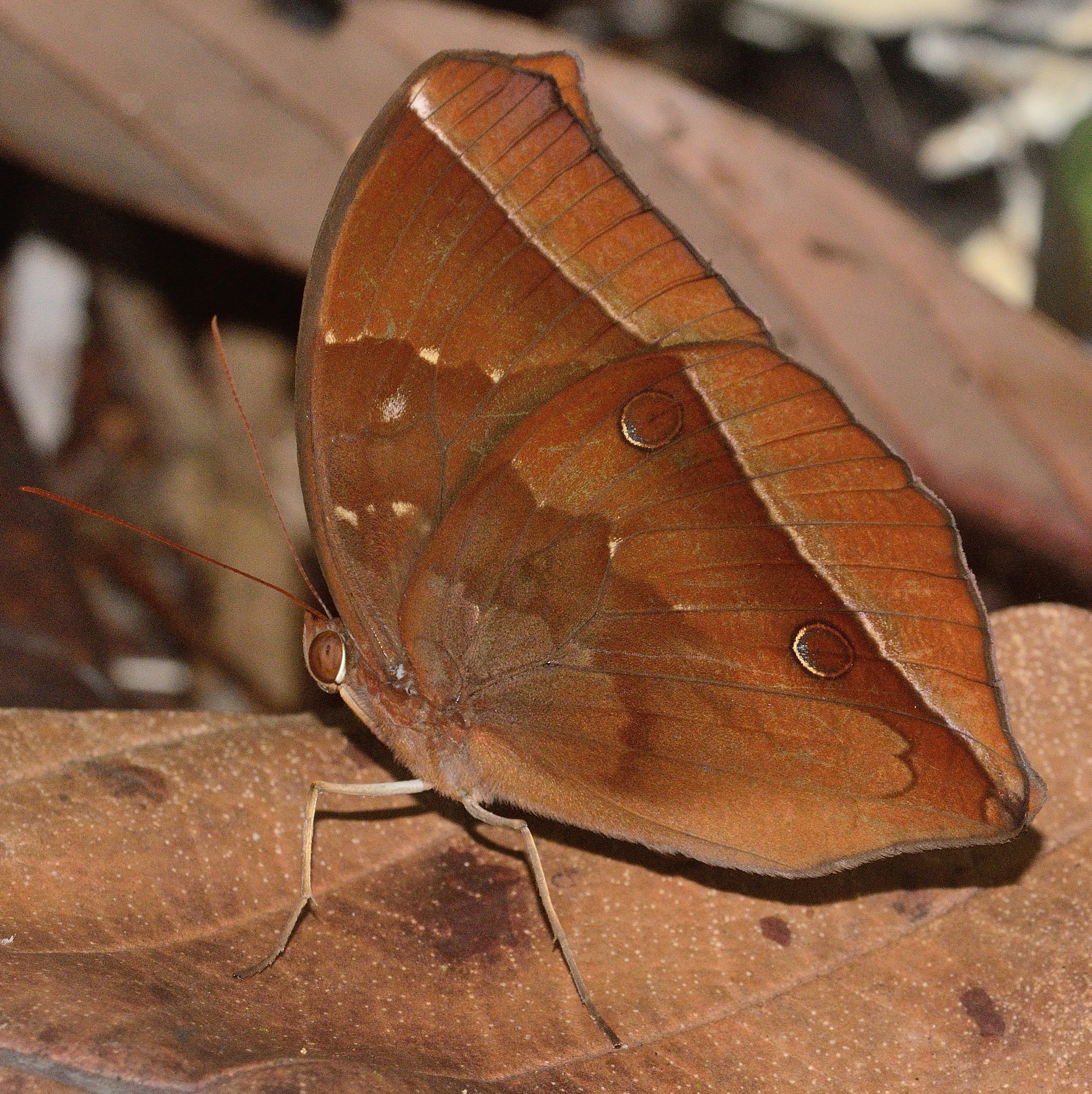

Scientific classification
- Kingdom: Animalia
- Phylum: Arthropoda
- Class: Insecta
- Order: Lepidoptera
- Family: Nymphalidae
- Genus: Thaumantis
- Species: T. noureddin

Binomial name
- Thaumantis noureddin Westwood, 1851

= Thaumantis noureddin =

Species of butterfly

Thaumantis noureddin, the dark jungle glory, is a butterfly in the family Nymphalidae. It was described by John Obadiah Westwood in 1851. It is found in the Indomalayan realm.

== Subspecies ==
- T. n. noureddin (Peninsular Malaya, Borneo)
- T. n. chatra Fruhstorfer, 1905 (Borneo)
- T. n. sultanus Stichel, 1906 (southern Borneo)
- T. n. sigirya Fruhstorfer, 1911 (Sumatra, Bangka Island)
