= Elegia inconspicuella =

Scientific classification
- Domain: Eukaryota
- Kingdom: Animalia
- Phylum: Arthropoda
- Class: Insecta
- Order: Lepidoptera
- Family: Pyralidae
- Genus: Elegia
- Species: E. inconspicuella

Binomial name
- Elegia inconspicuella (Ragonot, 1888)

Synonyms
- Nephopteryx inconspicuella Ragonot, 1888; Elegia fuscidorsella Ragonot, 1888; Elegia insulsella Ragonot, 1893

Species of moth

Elegia inconspicuella is a species of snout moth in the genus Elegia. It was described by Ragonot in 1888. It is found in South Africa.
