= Mesolia meyi =

Scientific classification
- Domain: Eukaryota
- Kingdom: Animalia
- Phylum: Arthropoda
- Class: Insecta
- Order: Lepidoptera
- Family: Crambidae
- Subfamily: Crambinae
- Tribe: Ancylolomiini
- Genus: Mesolia
- Species: M. meyi

Binomial name
- Mesolia meyi Bassi, 2013

Species of moth

Mesolia meyi is a moth in the family Crambidae. It was described by Graziano Bassi in 2013. It is found in Botswana and Namibia.
