= Mesolia oraculella =

Scientific classification
- Domain: Eukaryota
- Kingdom: Animalia
- Phylum: Arthropoda
- Class: Insecta
- Order: Lepidoptera
- Family: Crambidae
- Subfamily: Crambinae
- Tribe: Ancylolomiini
- Genus: Mesolia
- Species: M. oraculella

Binomial name
- Mesolia oraculella Kearfott, 1908

Species of moth

Mesolia oraculella is a moth in the family Crambidae. It was described by William D. Kearfott in 1908. It is found in the US state of Arizona.
