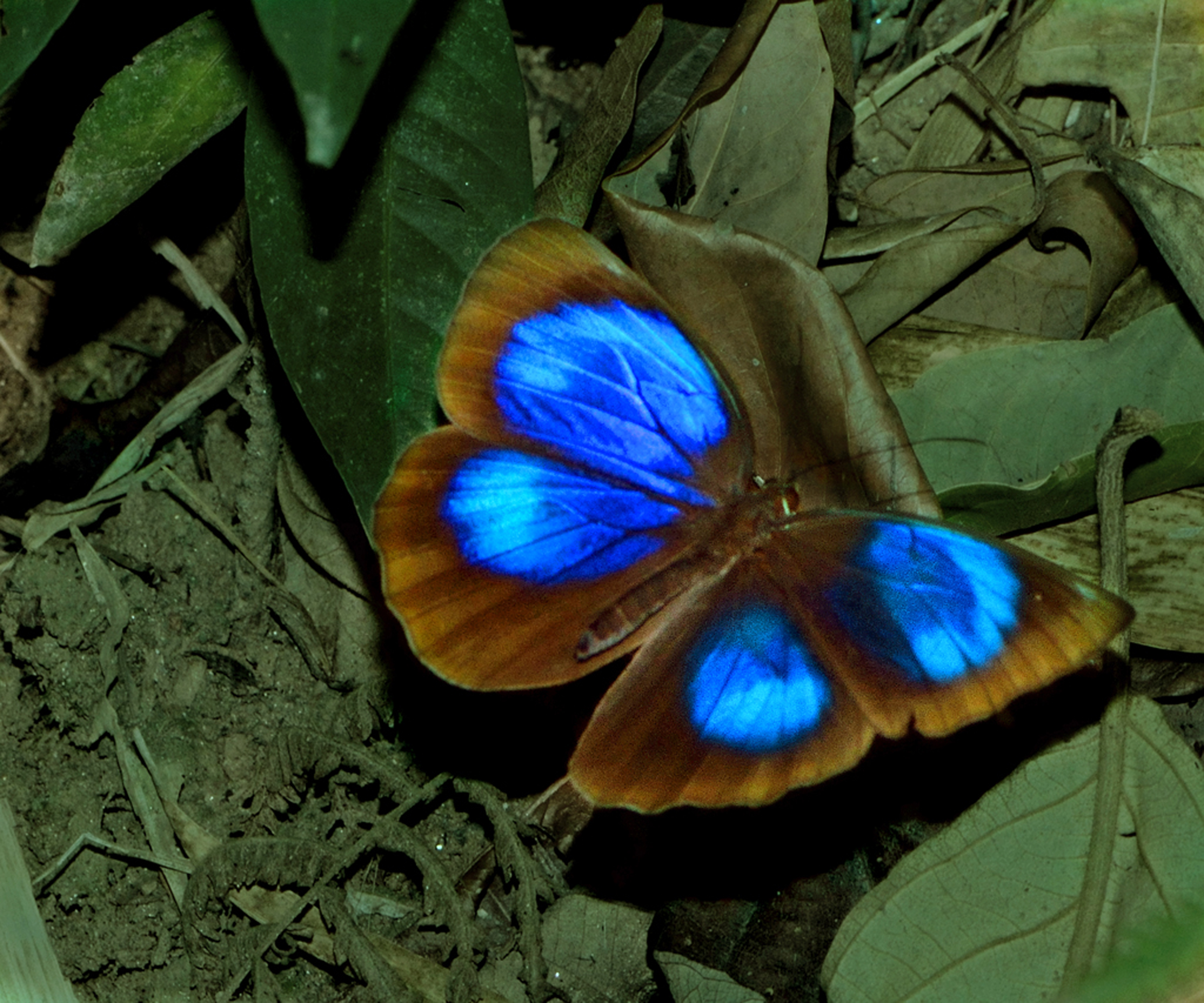

Scientific classification
- Kingdom: Animalia
- Phylum: Arthropoda
- Clade: Pancrustacea
- Class: Insecta
- Order: Lepidoptera
- Family: Nymphalidae
- Genus: Thaumantis
- Species: T. diores

Binomial name
- Thaumantis diores Doubleday, 1845

= Thaumantis diores =

Jungle glory

Species of butterfly

Thaumantis diores, the jungle glory, is a butterfly found in South Asia that belongs to the Morphinae subfamily of the brush-footed butterflies family.

== Distribution ==
The jungle glory ranges from Sikkim to Myanmar. It also found rarely in Bangladesh. A subspecies is found in Taiwan and it is suspected that the butterfly occurs in northern Thailand and northern Vietnam as well.

== Status ==
Evans reports the butterfly as not rare in its Indian range while Wynter-Blyth reports it as not common.

== Distribution ==
Males and females have the upperside dusky brown; forewing with a broad beautifully iridescent blue discal band from below vein 8 to the dorsum, extending posteriorly towards the base of the wing, outwardly suffused with a brilliant silvery gloss. Hindwing with a median, similar, somewhat rounded patch, the outward silvery gloss very brilliant, in fresh specimens the blue spreading towards the base of the wings. Underside rich silky brown, terminal margins of the wings broadly paler, sprinkled with lilacine scales near an inward well-defined very pale brownish-yellow sinuous line; the basal five-sixths of the wings darkening perceptibly outwards. Forewing with two pairs of transverse sinuous dark narrow bands across cell, followed by an oblique discal similar band, from costa to interspace 1. Hindwing with two similar transverse bands divergent posteriorly, an oval yellowish-white spot in interspaces 2 and 6 respectively and a dark tornal spot; the spot in interspace 2 shaded with brown. Antennae red; head, thorax and abdomen brown. Male secondary sex-mark a small erectile tuft of hair, not covering apparently any specialized scales, near the base of the subcostal vein on the upperside of the hindwing.

== See also ==
- List of butterflies of India
- List of butterflies of India (Morphinae)
- List of butterflies of India (Nymphalidae)
