= Parapediasia detomatellus =

Scientific classification
- Domain: Eukaryota
- Kingdom: Animalia
- Phylum: Arthropoda
- Class: Insecta
- Order: Lepidoptera
- Family: Crambidae
- Subfamily: Crambinae
- Tribe: Crambini
- Genus: Parapediasia
- Species: P. detomatellus

Binomial name
- Parapediasia detomatellus (Möschler, 1890)

Synonyms
- Crambus detomatellus Möschler, 1890; Parapediasia zerkowitzella Błeszyński, 1963

Species of moth

Parapediasia detomatellus is a moth in the family Crambidae. It was described by Heinrich Benno Möschler in 1890. It is found in Puerto Rico and Cuba.
