= Mesolia uniformella =

Scientific classification
- Domain: Eukaryota
- Kingdom: Animalia
- Phylum: Arthropoda
- Class: Insecta
- Order: Lepidoptera
- Family: Crambidae
- Subfamily: Crambinae
- Tribe: Ancylolomiini
- Genus: Mesolia
- Species: M. uniformella

Binomial name
- Mesolia uniformella Janse, 1922

Species of moth

Mesolia Uniformella is a moth in the family Crambidae. It was described by Anthonie Johannes Theodorus Janse in 1922. It is found in Botswana, Namibia, South Africa and Zimbabwe.
