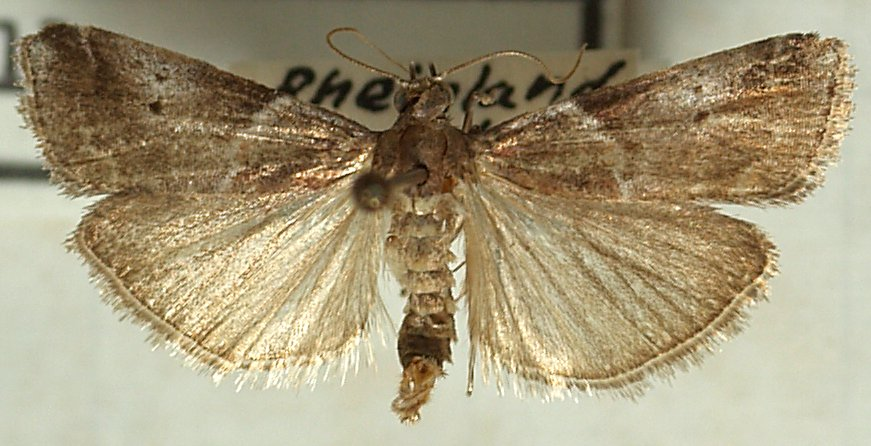

Scientific classification
- Kingdom: Animalia
- Phylum: Arthropoda
- Clade: Pancrustacea
- Class: Insecta
- Order: Lepidoptera
- Family: Pyralidae
- Genus: Acrobasis
- Species: A. suavella

Binomial name
- Acrobasis suavella (Zincken, 1818)

Synonyms
- Phycis suavella Zincken, 1818; Trachycera suavella (Zincken, 1818); Mineola supposita Heinrich, 1940; Phycita porphyrea Stephens, 1834

= Acrobasis suavella =

Species of moth

Acrobasis suavella, the thicket knot-horn or blackthorn knot-horn, is a moth of the family Pyralidae. It was described by Johann Leopold Theodor Friedrich Zincken in 1818 and is native to Europe. It has been accidentally introduced and become established around Vancouver, British Columbia.

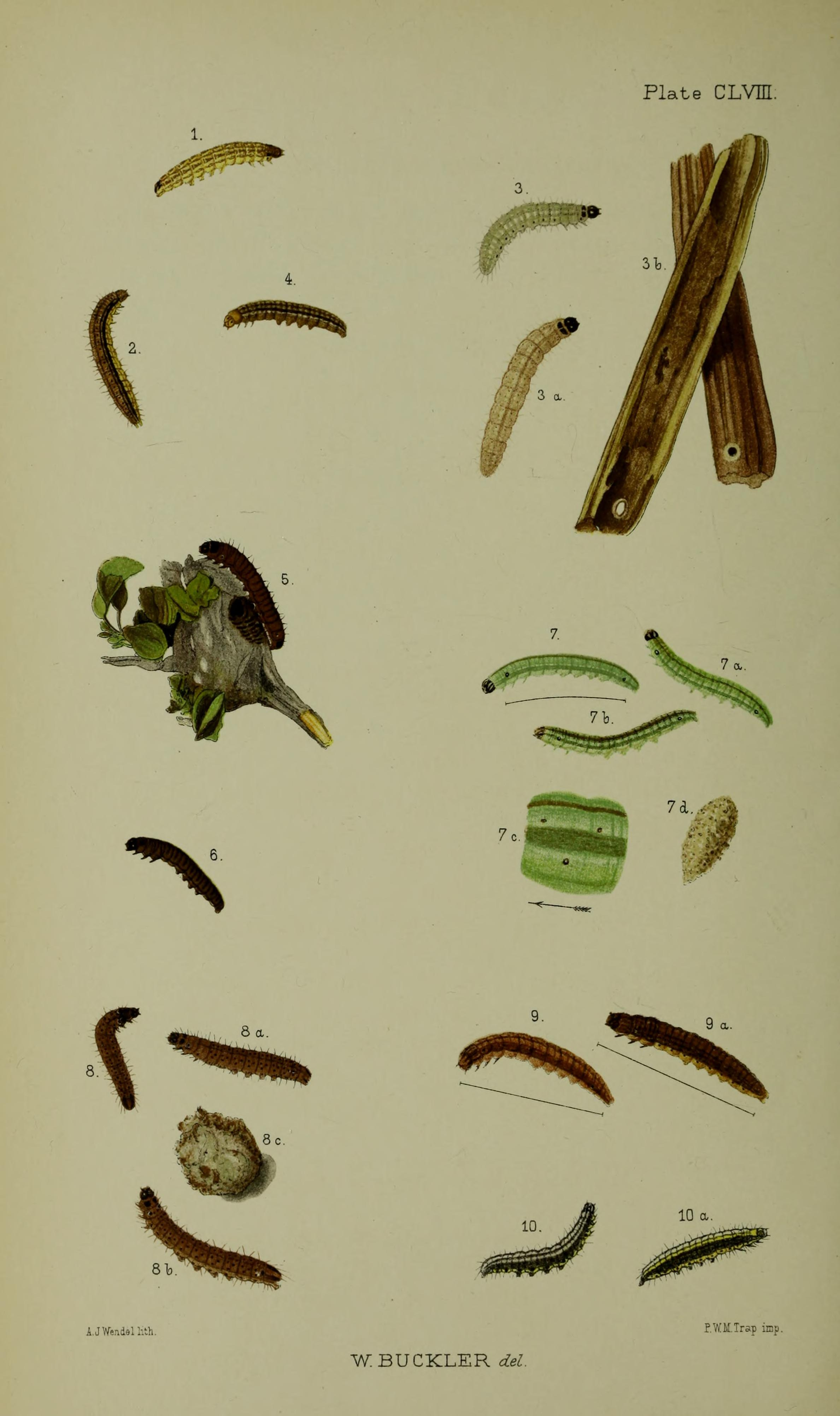
Fig. 5 larva after final moult on its foodplant in galleries of frass covered web on stunted sloe bushes

The wingspan is 22–24 mm. The moth flies in one generation from June to August on the British Isles, extending in low numbers to October in Belgium.

The caterpillars preferably feed on blackthorn, Prunus spinosa, but they have also been found on Cotoneaster, Crataegus, and Sorbus.
