= Parapediasia ligonellus =

Scientific classification
- Kingdom: Animalia
- Phylum: Arthropoda
- Clade: Pancrustacea
- Class: Insecta
- Order: Lepidoptera
- Family: Crambidae
- Subfamily: Crambinae
- Tribe: Crambini
- Genus: Parapediasia
- Species: P. ligonellus

Binomial name
- Parapediasia ligonellus (Zeller, 1881)

Synonyms
- Crambus ligonellus Zeller, 1881

Species of moth

Parapediasia ligonellus is a moth in the family Crambidae. It was described by Zeller in 1881. It is found in Jamaica, Cuba and Puerto Rico. It is also found in southern Florida.

The wingspan is about 17 mm.
