= Mesolia microdontalis =

Scientific classification
- Kingdom: Animalia
- Phylum: Arthropoda
- Class: Insecta
- Order: Lepidoptera
- Family: Crambidae
- Subfamily: Crambinae
- Tribe: Ancylolomiini
- Genus: Mesolia
- Species: M. microdontalis

Binomial name
- Mesolia microdontalis (Hampson, 1919)

Synonyms
- Prionopteryx microdontalis Hampson, 1919

Species of moth

Mesolia microdontalis is a moth in the family Crambidae. It was described by George Hampson in 1919. It is found in Ghana, Nigeria and Sierra Leone.
