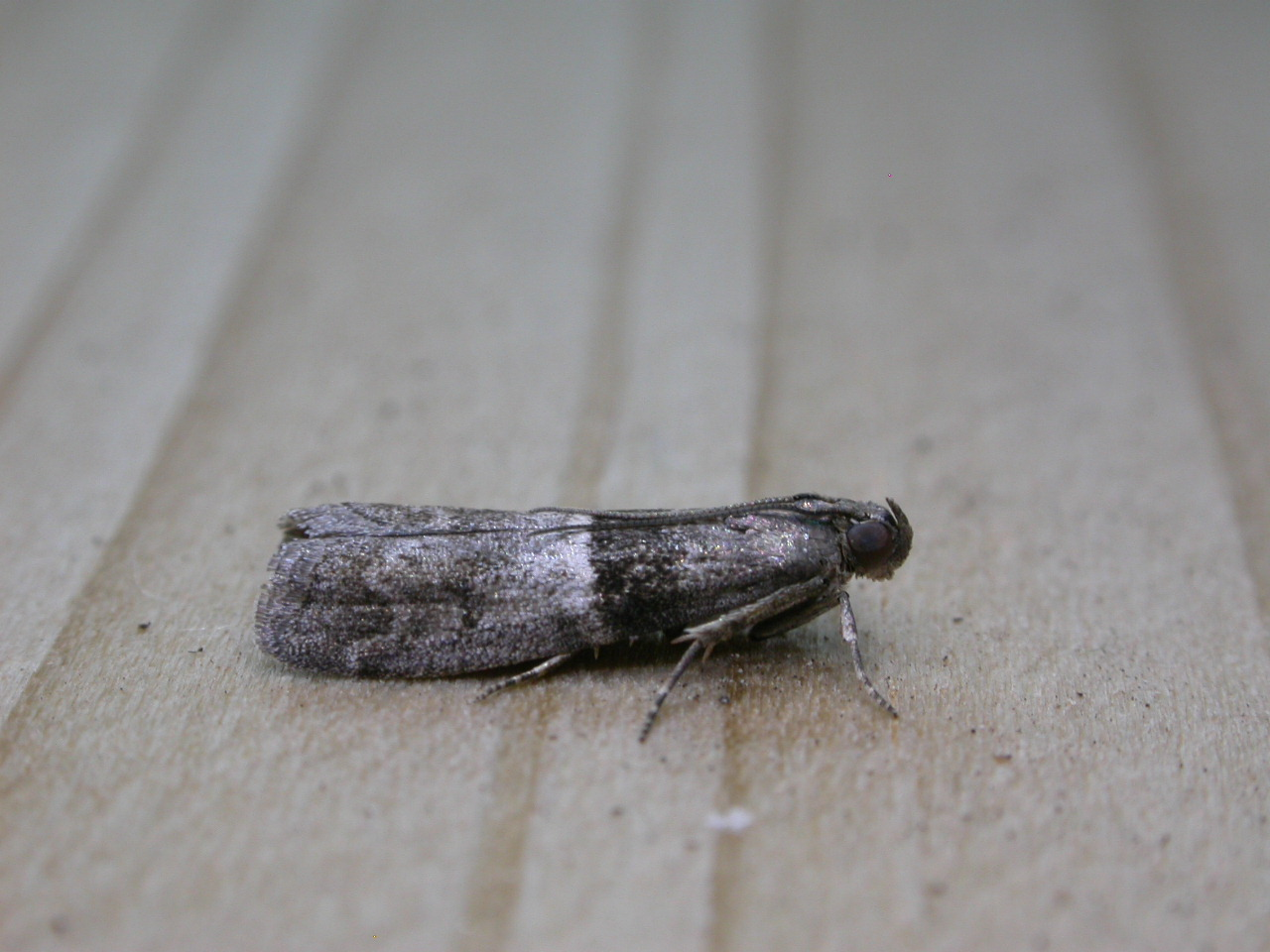
- Elegia fallax

Scientific classification
- Domain: Eukaryota
- Kingdom: Animalia
- Phylum: Arthropoda
- Class: Insecta
- Order: Lepidoptera
- Family: Pyralidae
- Subfamily: Phycitinae
- Tribe: Phycitini
- Genus: Elegia; Ragonot, 1887

Synonyms
- Ichorarchis Meyrick, 1937; Microthrix Ragonot, 1888

= Elegia (moth) =

Genus of moths

Elegia is a genus of snout moths. It was described by Émile Louis Ragonot in 1887.

== Species ==
- Elegia fallax (Staudinger, 1881)
- Elegia feminina Kemal, Kızıldağ & Koçak, 2020
- Elegia inconspicuella (Ragonot, 1888)
- Elegia miserabilis (Strand, 1919)
- Elegia omichleuta (Meyrick, 1934)
- Elegia relictella (Caradja, 1925)
- Elegia saecula Kemal, Kızıldağ & Koçak, 2020
- Elegia similella (Zincken, 1818)
- Elegia southi (West, 1932)
