= Parapediasia subtilellus =

Scientific classification
- Kingdom: Animalia
- Phylum: Arthropoda
- Clade: Pancrustacea
- Class: Insecta
- Order: Lepidoptera
- Family: Crambidae
- Subfamily: Crambinae
- Tribe: Crambini
- Genus: Parapediasia
- Species: P. subtilellus

Binomial name
- Parapediasia subtilellus (Zeller, 1863)

Synonyms
- Crambus subtilellus Zeller, 1863; Crambus diascia Hampson, 1919

Species of moth

Parapediasia subtilellus is a moth in the family Crambidae. It was described by Zeller in 1863. It is found in Brazil and Paraguay.
