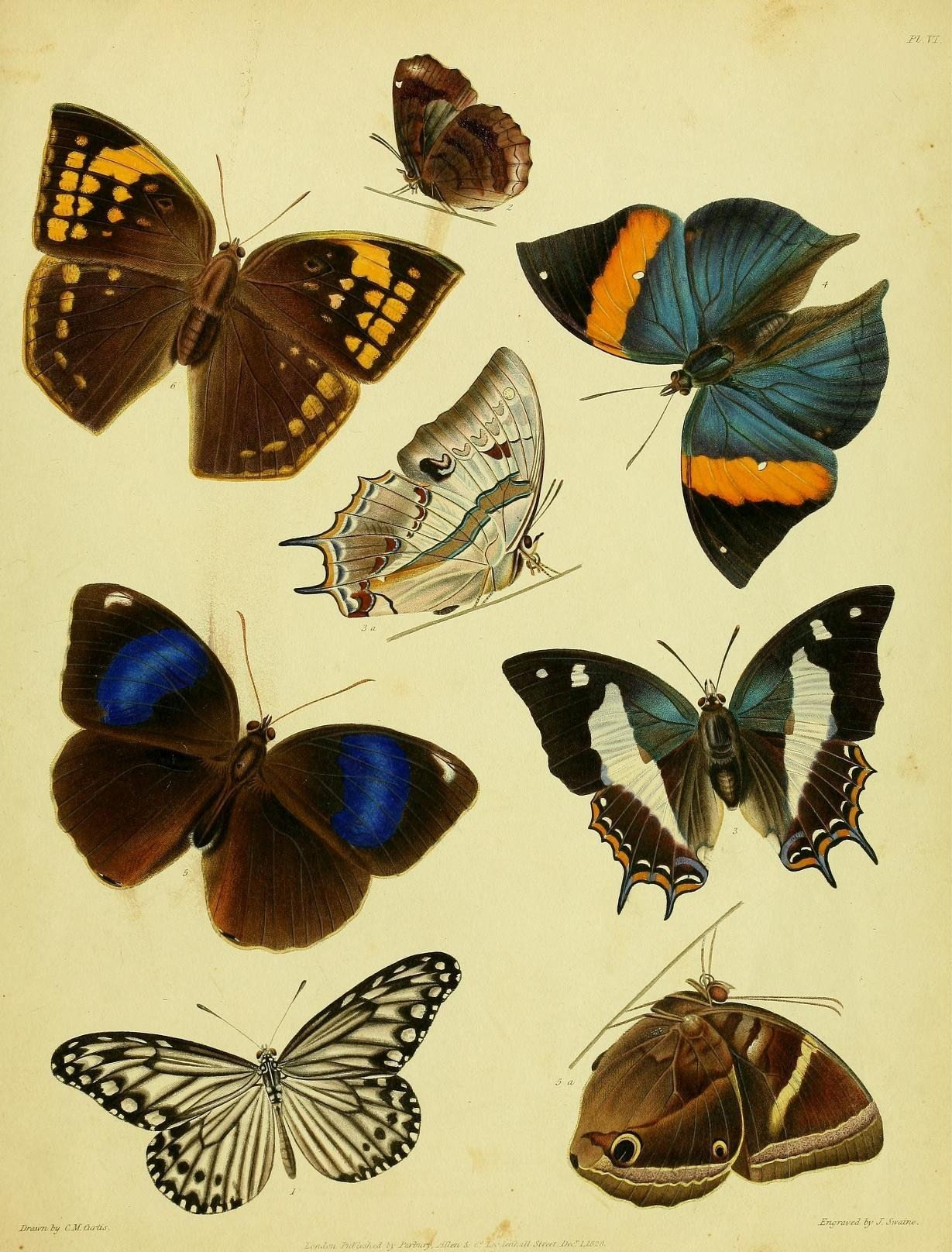
- In Thomas Horsfield and Frederic Moore's Catalogue of the Lepidoptera in the East India Company Museum

Scientific classification
- Kingdom: Animalia
- Phylum: Arthropoda
- Clade: Pancrustacea
- Class: Insecta
- Order: Lepidoptera
- Family: Nymphalidae
- Genus: Thaumantis
- Species: T. odana

Binomial name
- Thaumantis odana (Godart, [1824])

Synonyms
- Morpho odana Godart, [1824]; Thaumantis oda Hübner, [1826]; Thaumantis odana var. cyclops Röber, 1904; Thaumantis odana cyclops f. depupillata Fruhstorfer, 1905

= Thaumantis odana =

Species of butterfly

Thaumantis odana, Malayan Jungle Glory, is a butterfly in the family Nymphalidae. It was described by Jean Baptiste Godart in 1824. It is found in the Indomalayan realm.

== Subspecies ==
- T. o. albocostalis Fruhstorfer, 1911 – Indonesia (Java)
- T. o. cyclops Röber, 1904 – Indonesia (Borneo)
- T. o. odana (Godart, [1824]) – Indonesia (Java)
- T. o. panwila Fruhstorfer, 1911 – Malaysia (Brunei)
- T. o. paramita Fruhstorfer, 1905 (Sumatra)
- T. o. pishuna Fruhstorfer, 1905 – Malaysia (Peninsular Malaya), Thailand
- T. o. yantiva Fruhstorfer, 1911 – Indonesia (Nias)
- T. o. wedana Fruhstorfer, 1911 – Indonesia (Java)
