= Mesolia monodella =

Scientific classification
- Domain: Eukaryota
- Kingdom: Animalia
- Phylum: Arthropoda
- Class: Insecta
- Order: Lepidoptera
- Family: Crambidae
- Subfamily: Crambinae
- Tribe: Ancylolomiini
- Genus: Mesolia
- Species: M. monodella

Binomial name
- Mesolia monodella Marion, 1957

Species of moth

Mesolia monodella is a moth in the family Crambidae. It was described by Hubert Marion in 1957. It is found in Benin.
