= Parapediasia torquatella =

Scientific classification
- Kingdom: Animalia
- Phylum: Arthropoda
- Clade: Pancrustacea
- Class: Insecta
- Order: Lepidoptera
- Family: Crambidae
- Subfamily: Crambinae
- Tribe: Crambini
- Genus: Parapediasia
- Species: P. torquatella

Binomial name
- Parapediasia torquatella B. Landry, 1995

Species of moth

Parapediasia torquatella is a moth in the family Crambidae. It was described by Bernard Landry in 1995. It is found in North America, where it has been recorded from Arizona, California, Colorado and New Mexico.
