= Mesolia huachucaella =

Scientific classification
- Domain: Eukaryota
- Kingdom: Animalia
- Phylum: Arthropoda
- Class: Insecta
- Order: Lepidoptera
- Family: Crambidae
- Subfamily: Crambinae
- Tribe: Ancylolomiini
- Genus: Mesolia
- Species: M. huachucaella

Binomial name
- Mesolia huachucaella Kearfott, 1908

Species of moth

Mesolia huachucaella is a moth in the family Crambidae. It was described by William D. Kearfott in 1908. It is found in the US state of Arizona.

The wingspan is 15–10 mm for males and 17–20 mm for females. The forewings are dark grayish brown. Adults are on wing from July to August.
