= Mesolia plurimellus =

Scientific classification
- Kingdom: Animalia
- Phylum: Arthropoda
- Class: Insecta
- Order: Lepidoptera
- Family: Crambidae
- Subfamily: Crambinae
- Tribe: Ancylolomiini
- Genus: Mesolia
- Species: M. plurimellus

Binomial name
- Mesolia plurimellus (Walker, 1863)

Synonyms
- Crambus plurimellus Walker, 1863

Species of moth

Mesolia plurimellus is a moth in the family Crambidae. It was described by Francis Walker in 1863. It is found in the Dominican Republic.
