= Elegia relictella =

Scientific classification
- Domain: Eukaryota
- Kingdom: Animalia
- Phylum: Arthropoda
- Class: Insecta
- Order: Lepidoptera
- Family: Pyralidae
- Genus: Elegia
- Species: E. relictella

Binomial name
- Elegia relictella (Caradja, 1925)

Synonyms
- Microthrix relictella Caradja, 1925

Species of moth

Elegia relictella is a species of snout moth in the genus Elegia. It was described by Aristide Caradja in 1925 and is known from Guangdong, China.
