= Mesolia =

Scientific classification
- Domain: Eukaryota
- Kingdom: Animalia
- Phylum: Arthropoda
- Class: Insecta
- Order: Lepidoptera
- Family: Crambidae
- Subfamily: Crambinae
- Tribe: Ancylolomiini
- Genus: Mesolia; Ragonot in de Joannis & Ragonot, 1889

Synonyms
- Deuterolia Dyar, 1914; Eugrotea Fernald, 1896; Euparolia Dyar, 1914; Masolia Hampson, 1919

Genus of moths

Mesolia is a genus of moths of the family Crambidae described by Émile Louis Ragonot in 1889.

== Description ==
Palpi porrect (extending forward), thickly clothed with hair, and extending about twice the length of the head. Maxillary palp triangularly scaled. Frons with a conical projection. Antennae of male thickened and flattened. Tibia with the outer spurs about half the length of inner. Forewings long and narrow, with rounded apex. Veins 4 and 5 from angle of cell and vein 3 absent. Veins 7, 8 and 9 stalked and veins 10 and 11 free. The outer margin produced from apex to vein 5. Hindwings with vein 3 absent. Veins 4 and 5 from angle of cell and vein 6 from upper angle. The upper margin of cell widely separated from veins 8 and vein 7 curving upwards to anastomose with vein 8.

== Species ==
- Mesolia albimaculalis Hampson, 1919
- Mesolia baboquivariella (Kearfott, 1907)
- Mesolia bipunctella Wileman & South, 1918
- Mesolia huachucaella Kearfott, 1908
- Mesolia incertellus (Zincken, 1821)
- Mesolia jamaicensis Hampson, 1919
- Mesolia margistrigella Hampson, 1899
- Mesolia meyi Bassi, 2013
- Mesolia microdontalis (Hampson, 1919)
- Mesolia monodella Marion, 1957
- Mesolia nipis (Dyar, 1914)
- Mesolia oraculella Kearfott, 1908
- Mesolia pandavella Ragonot in de Joannis & Ragonot, 1889
- Mesolia pelopa (Turner, 1947)
- Mesolia plurimellus (Walker, 1863)
- Mesolia presidialis Hampson, 1919
- Mesolia rectilineella Hampson, 1899
- Mesolia scythrastis Turner, 1904
- Mesolia uniformella Janse, 1922
