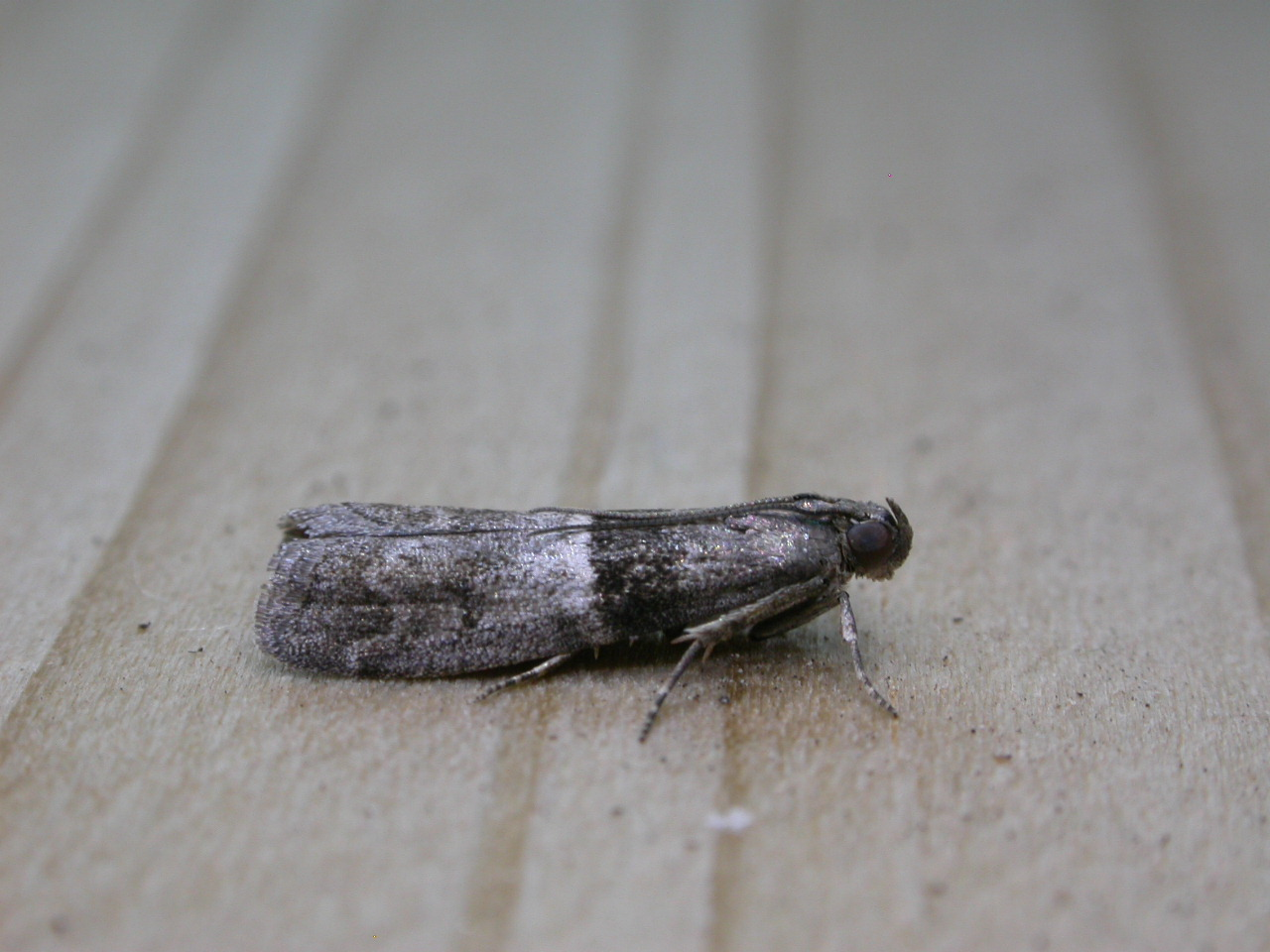

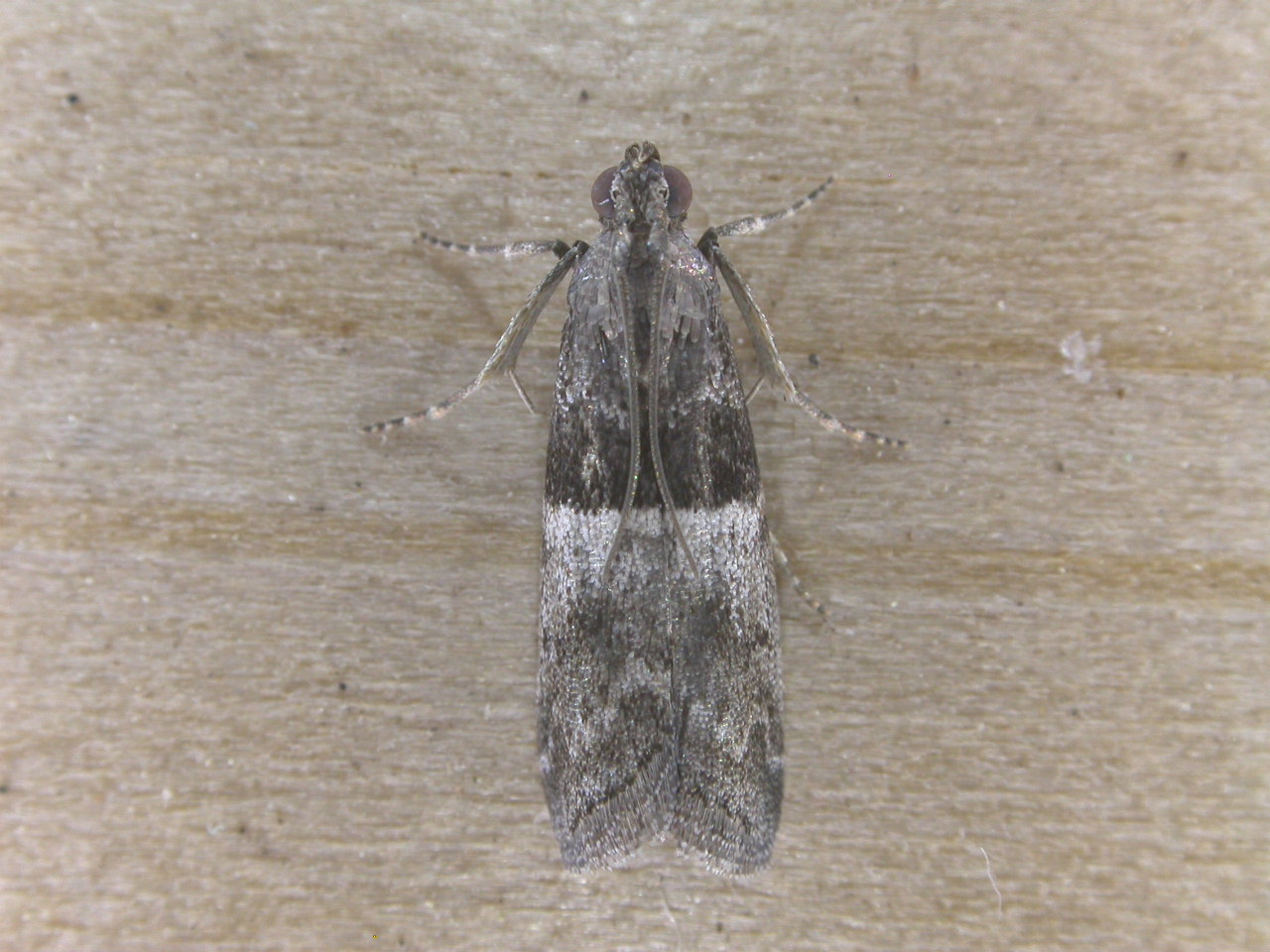

Scientific classification
- Kingdom: Animalia
- Phylum: Arthropoda
- Class: Insecta
- Order: Lepidoptera
- Family: Pyralidae
- Genus: Elegia
- Species: E. fallax

Binomial name
- Elegia fallax (Staudinger, 1881)

Synonyms
- Nephopterix fallax Staudinger, 1881; Elegia atrifasciella Ragonot, 1825; Ichorarchis elegiella Amsel, 1953; Ichorarchis iozona Meyrick, 1937

= Elegia fallax =

Species of moth

Elegia fallax is a moth of the family Pyralidae. It is known from Spain, Portugal, France, Italy, Croatia, the Czech Republic, Slovenia, Hungary, Romania, Bulgaria, North Macedonia and Greece. It has also been recorded from the Channel Islands in 2005.

The wingspan is 17–19 mm.

The larvae feed on Quercus (oak) species.
