= Mesolia pelopa =

Scientific classification
- Kingdom: Animalia
- Phylum: Arthropoda
- Class: Insecta
- Order: Lepidoptera
- Family: Crambidae
- Subfamily: Crambinae
- Tribe: Ancylolomiini
- Genus: Mesolia
- Species: M. pelopa

Binomial name
- Mesolia pelopa (Turner, 1947)

Synonyms
- Lioprosopa pelopa Turner, 1947

Species of moth

Mesolia pelopa is a moth in the family Crambidae. It was described by Turner in 1947. It is found in Australia, where it has been recorded from the Northern Territory.

The wingspan is about 18 mm.
