= Mesolia nipis =

Scientific classification
- Kingdom: Animalia
- Phylum: Arthropoda
- Class: Insecta
- Order: Lepidoptera
- Family: Crambidae
- Subfamily: Crambinae
- Tribe: Ancylolomiini
- Genus: Mesolia
- Species: M. nipis

Binomial name
- Mesolia nipis (Dyar, 1914)

Synonyms
- Deuterolia nipis Dyar, 1914; Euparolia nipimidalis Dyar, 1914

Species of moth

Mesolia nipis is a moth in the family Crambidae. It was described by Harrison Gray Dyar Jr. in 1914. It is found in Mexico.
