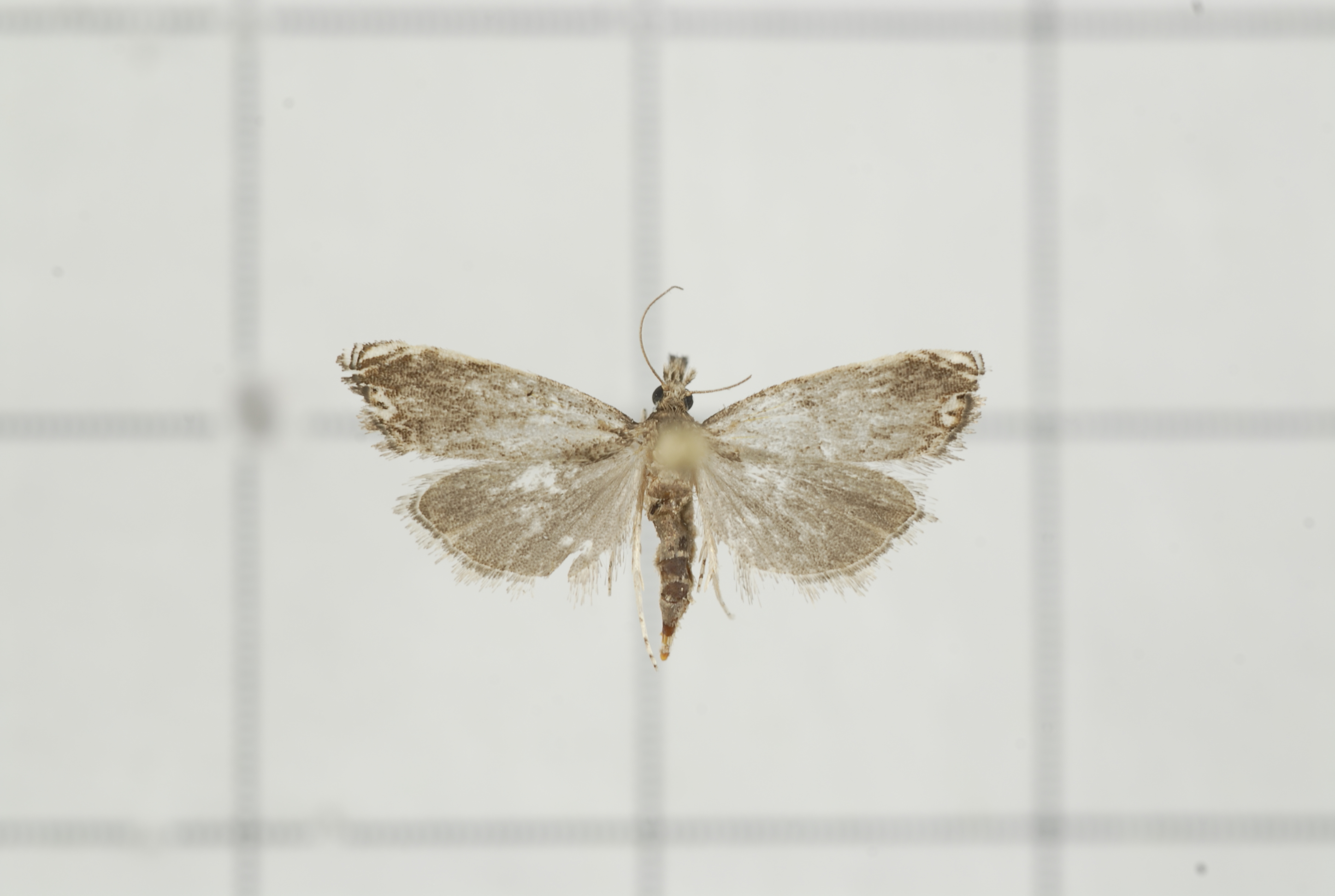

Scientific classification
- Domain: Eukaryota
- Kingdom: Animalia
- Phylum: Arthropoda
- Class: Insecta
- Order: Lepidoptera
- Family: Crambidae
- Subfamily: Crambinae
- Tribe: Ancylolomiini
- Genus: Mesolia
- Species: M. bipunctella

Binomial name
- Mesolia bipunctella Wileman & South, 1918

Synonyms
- Mesolia erotica Strand, 1918

= Mesolia bipunctella =

Species of moth

Mesolia bipunctella is a moth in the family Crambidae. It was described by Wileman and South in 1918. It is found in Taiwan.
