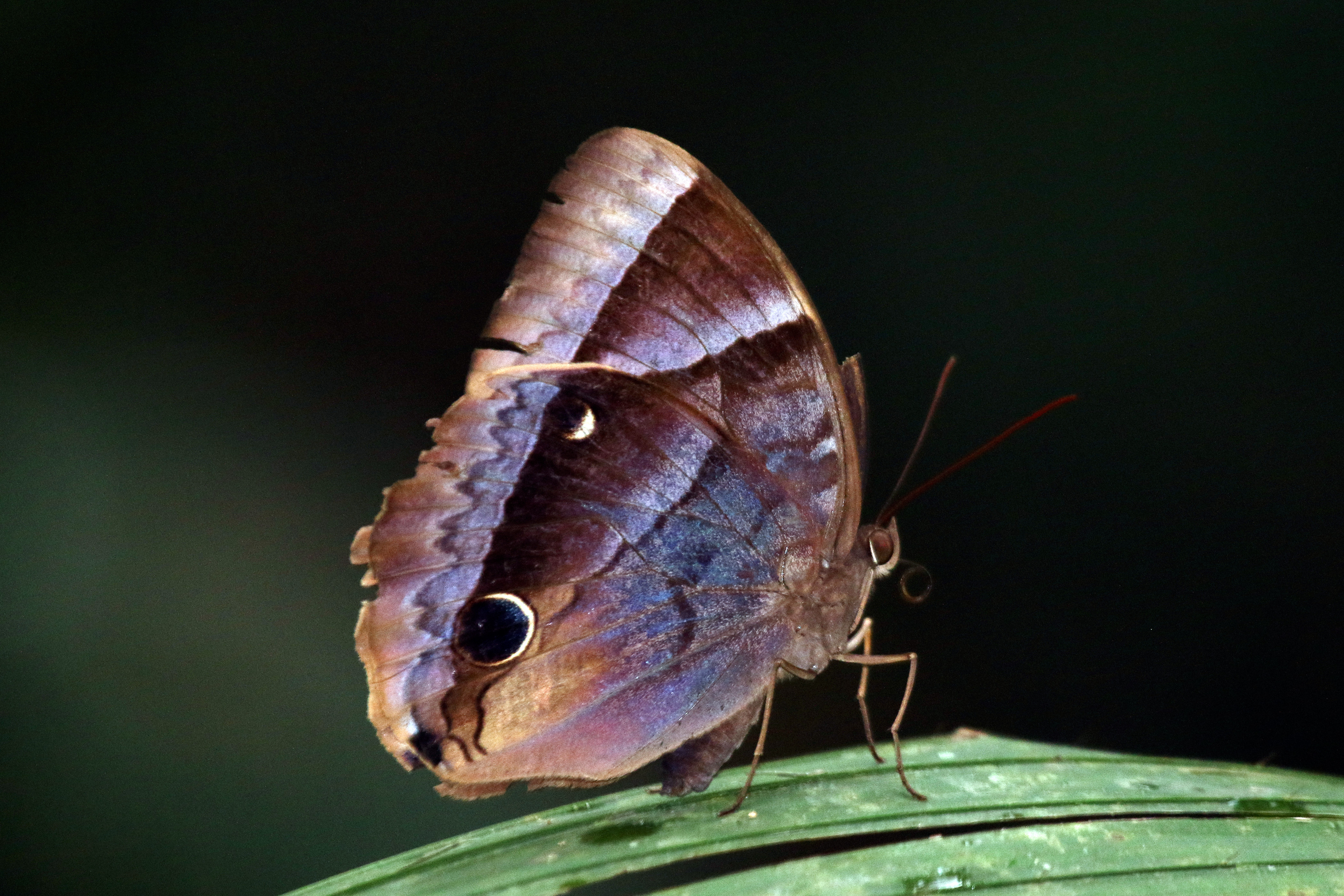
- T. klugius lucipor dark blue jungle glory Sabah, Borneo, Malaysia

Scientific classification
- Domain: Eukaryota
- Kingdom: Animalia
- Phylum: Arthropoda
- Class: Insecta
- Order: Lepidoptera
- Family: Nymphalidae
- Subfamily: Satyrinae
- Genus: Thaumantis; Hübner, [1826]

Synonyms
- Nandogea Moore, 1894; Nandogea Moore, [1895]; Kringana Moore, [1895]

= Thaumantis =

Genus of brush-footed butterflies

Thaumantis is a Southeast Asian genus of butterflies in the family Nymphalidae. Its consists of large, showy butterflies with iridescent purplish blue bands on the dorsal wing surfaces.

== Species ==
- Thaumantis diores Doubleday, 1845 – jungle glory
- Thaumantis klugius (Zinken, 1831) – dark blue jungle glory
- Thaumantis noureddin Westwood, 1851
- Thaumantis odana (Godart, [1824])
