= Elegia miserabilis =

Scientific classification
- Domain: Eukaryota
- Kingdom: Animalia
- Phylum: Arthropoda
- Class: Insecta
- Order: Lepidoptera
- Family: Pyralidae
- Genus: Elegia
- Species: E. miserabilis

Binomial name
- Elegia miserabilis (Strand, 1919)

Synonyms
- Microthrix miserabilis Strand, 1919; Cryptoblabes miserabilis

Species of moth

Elegia miserabilis is a species of moth of the family Pyralidae. It was described by Embrik Strand in 1919 and is found in Taiwan.
