= Mesolia scythrastis =

Scientific classification
- Domain: Eukaryota
- Kingdom: Animalia
- Phylum: Arthropoda
- Class: Insecta
- Order: Lepidoptera
- Family: Crambidae
- Subfamily: Crambinae
- Tribe: Ancylolomiini
- Genus: Mesolia
- Species: M. scythrastis

Binomial name
- Mesolia scythrastis Turner, 1904

Species of moth

Mesolia scythrastis is a moth in the family Crambidae. It was described by Turner in 1904. It is found in Australia, where it has been recorded from Queensland.
