= Parapediasia hulstellus =

Scientific classification
- Domain: Eukaryota
- Kingdom: Animalia
- Phylum: Arthropoda
- Class: Insecta
- Order: Lepidoptera
- Family: Crambidae
- Subfamily: Crambinae
- Tribe: Crambini
- Genus: Parapediasia
- Species: P. hulstellus

Binomial name
- Parapediasia hulstellus (Fernald, 1885)

Synonyms
- Crambus hulstellus Fernald, 1885

Species of moth

Parapediasia hulstellus is a moth in the family Crambidae. It was described by Charles H. Fernald in 1885. It is found in North America, where it has been recorded from Texas.
