= Julius Leopold Theodor Friedrich Zincken =

German entomologist

Julius Leopold Theodor Friedrich Zincken or Zinken also Sommer (15 April 1770 in Braunschweig – 8 February 1856 in Braunschweig) was a German entomologist. He also appears in literature cited as Zinken-Sommers and Zinken gennant Sommers.

He was co-editor, with Ernst Friedrich Germar of Magazin der Entomologie Hendel & Son. Halle. also known as Germar's Magazine in which he wrote many articles and described new species and genera especially in the Tineidae.

Zincken's collection was sold on his death. Its subsequent history is unknown.

== Works ==
Partial list

- Zincken, J. L. T. F. 1817. Die Linneischen Tineen, in ihre natürlichen Gattungen aufgelöst und beschrieben. Magazin der Entomologie, Halle 2: 24–113.
- Zincken, J. L. T. F. 1818. Die Lineeischen Tineen, in ihre natürlichen Gattungen aufgelöst und beschrieben. Magazin der Entomologie, Halle 3: 114–116.
- Zincken, J. L. T. F. 1821. Die Linnéeischen Tineen, in ihre natürlichen Gattungen aufgelöst und beschrieben. Magazin der Entomologie, Halle 4: 231–245.
- Zincken, J. L. T. F. 1821. Nachtrag zur Monographie der Gattung Chilo. Magazin der Entomologie, Halle 4: 246–258.
- Zincken genannt Sommer, J. L. T. F. 1829. Anweisung zum Seidenbau überhaupt und insbesondere in Bezuge auf das nördliche Deutschland, nach den neuesten Verbesserungen desselben und nach eigenen Erfahrungen und über die Naturgeschichte des Seidenspinners selbst angestellten Versuchen abgefasst, Braunschweig, Meyer
- Zincken genannt Sommer, J. L. T. F. 1831. Beitrag zur Insecten-Fauna von Java. Erste Abtheilung. Nova Acta Leopoldina 15: 1.
- Zincken genannt Sommer, J. L. T. F. 1832. Anweisung für Gartenbesitzer und Landleute, wie dieselben in jedem Monate des Jahres zu verfahren haben, um in ihren Gärten Obst und Gartenfrüchte vor den Zerstörungen durch schädliche Insekten an leichtesten zu schützen, Braunschweig, Meyer
