= Pseudobissetia ustalis =

Scientific classification
- Kingdom: Animalia
- Phylum: Arthropoda
- Class: Insecta
- Order: Lepidoptera
- Family: Crambidae
- Subfamily: Crambinae
- Tribe: Haimbachiini
- Genus: Pseudobissetia
- Species: P. ustalis

Binomial name
- Pseudobissetia ustalis (Hampson, 1919)

Synonyms
- Diatraea ustalis Hampson, 1919

Species of moth

Pseudobissetia ustalis is a moth in the family Crambidae. It was described by George Hampson in 1919. It is found in India.
