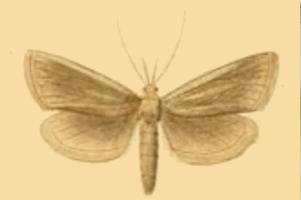

Scientific classification
- Domain: Eukaryota
- Kingdom: Animalia
- Phylum: Arthropoda
- Class: Insecta
- Order: Lepidoptera
- Family: Crambidae
- Subfamily: Crambinae
- Tribe: Haimbachiini
- Genus: Pseudobissetia; Bleszynski, 1959

= Pseudobissetia =

Genus of moths

Pseudobissetia is a genus of moths of the family Crambidae.

== Species ==
- Pseudobissetia terrestrellus (Christoph, 1885)
- Pseudobissetia ustalis (Hampson, 1919)
