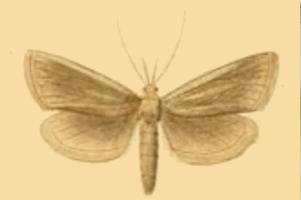

Scientific classification
- Domain: Eukaryota
- Kingdom: Animalia
- Phylum: Arthropoda
- Class: Insecta
- Order: Lepidoptera
- Family: Crambidae
- Subfamily: Crambinae
- Tribe: Haimbachiini
- Genus: Pseudobissetia
- Species: P. terrestrellus

Binomial name
- Pseudobissetia terrestrellus (Christoph, 1885)

Synonyms
- Chilo terrestrellus Christoph, 1885; Pseudobissetia terrestrella; Chilo hypenalis Rebel, 1910; Crambus tozeurellus D. Lucas, 1911

= Pseudobissetia terrestrellus =

Species of moth

Pseudobissetia terrestrellus is a species of moth in the family Crambidae. It is found in Spain, Italy, Romania, Bulgaria, Tunisia, Jordan, Syria, Iran, Transcaspia, Turkmenia, Buchara and Turkmenistan.

The wingspan is about 23 mm.

The larvae feed on Zea mays.
