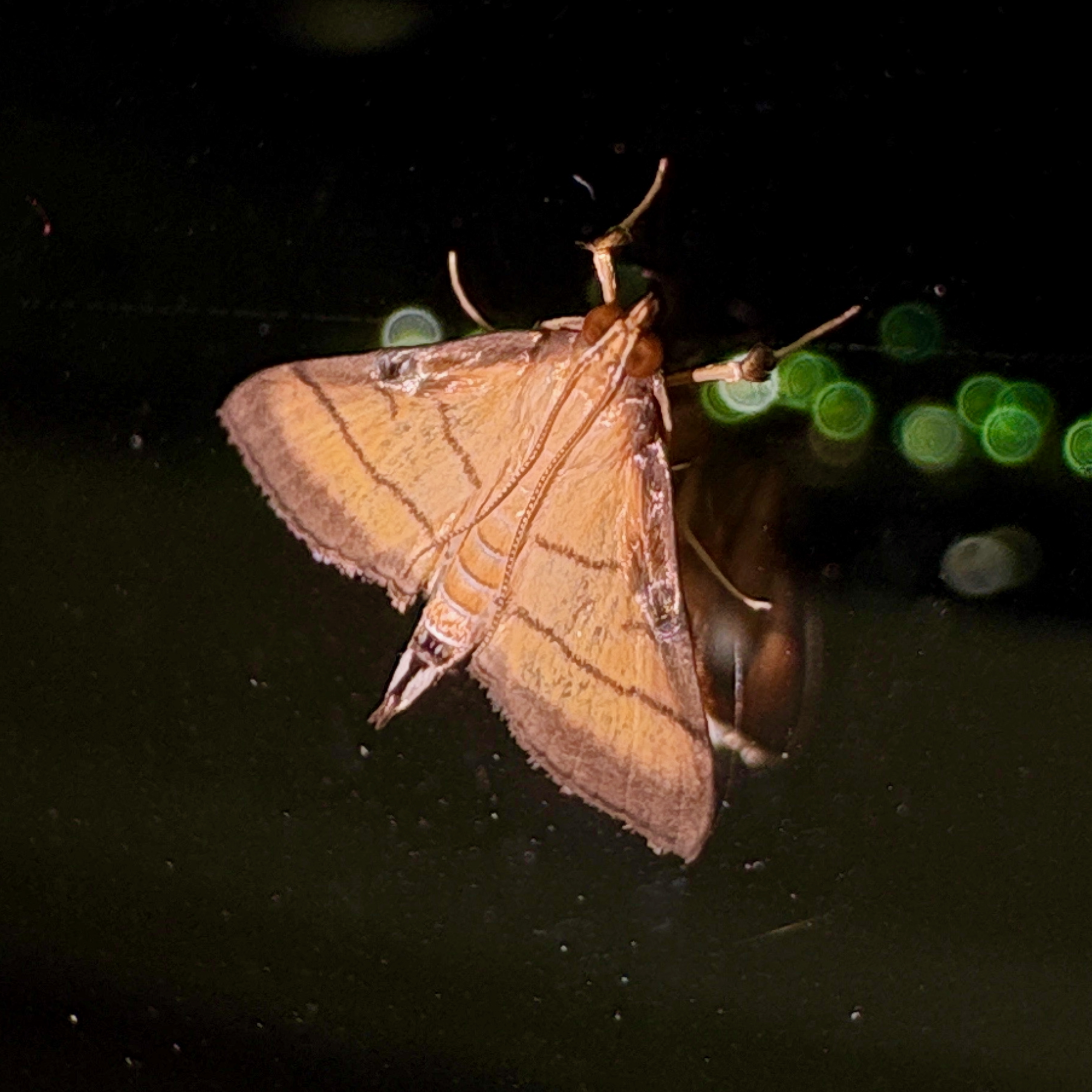
- An adult male of Cnaphalocrocis medinalis

Scientific classification
- Kingdom: Animalia
- Phylum: Arthropoda
- Clade: Pancrustacea
- Class: Insecta
- Order: Lepidoptera
- Family: Crambidae
- Subfamily: Spilomelinae
- Tribe: Spilomelini; Guenée, 1854

= Spilomelini =

Tribe of moths

Spilomelini is a tribe of the species-rich subfamily Spilomelinae in the pyraloid moth family Crambidae. The tribe was erected by Achille Guenée in 1854.

The tribe currently comprises the following 17 genera, altogether containing 135 species:

- Aethaloessa Lederer, 1863 (= Chnaura Lederer, 1863)
- Ceratarcha Swinhoe, 1894
- Cirrhocephalina Munroe, 1995 (= Cirrhocephala Lederer, 1863)
- Cnaphalocrocis Lederer, 1863
- Eporidia Walker, 1859 (= Eporedia Walker, 1859, = Glaucoda Karsch, 1900)
- Geshna Dyar, 1906
- Marasmia Lederer, 1863 (= Bradinomorpha Matsumura, 1920, Dolichosticha Meyrick, 1884, Epimima Meyrick, 1886, Lasiacme Warren, 1896, Marasma, Neomarasmia Kalra, David & Banerji, 1967, Prodotaula Meyrick, 1934, Susumia Marumo, 1930)
- Marasmianympha Munroe, 1991
- Massepha Walker, 1859
- Orphanostigma Warren, 1890 (= Orphanostagma J. C. Shaffer & Munroe, 2007)
- Palpusia Amsel, 1956
- Rhectocraspeda Warren, 1892 (= Pilemia Möschler, 1882, Rapoona Hedemann, 1894, Rapona Schaus, 1940)
- Salbia Guenée, 1854 (= Salbiomorpha Snellen, 1875)
- Scaptesylodes Munroe, 1976
- Siga Hübner, 1820
- Spilomela Guenée, 1854
- Zeuzerobotys Munroe, 1963 (= Zeurzerobotys Munroe, 1963)
