= Coelorhyncidia nitidalis =

Scientific classification
- Domain: Eukaryota
- Kingdom: Animalia
- Phylum: Arthropoda
- Class: Insecta
- Order: Lepidoptera
- Family: Crambidae
- Subfamily: Spilomelinae
- Genus: Coelorhyncidia
- Species: C. nitidalis

Binomial name
- Coelorhyncidia nitidalis Hampson, 1907

Species of moth

Coelorhyncidia nitidalis is a moth in the family Crambidae. It was described by George Hampson in 1907. It is found in Papua New Guinea.
