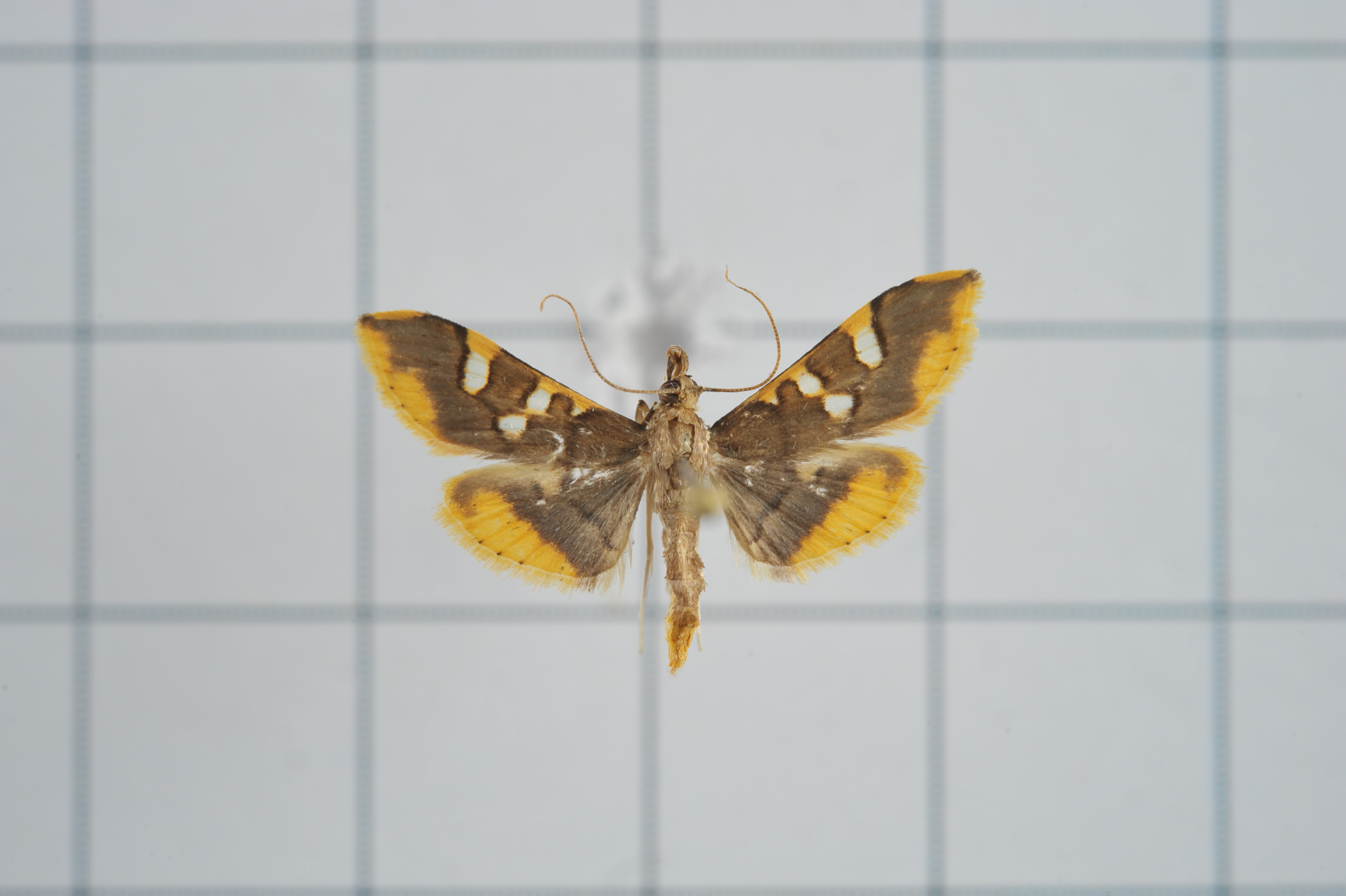
- Prophantis adusta

Scientific classification
- Kingdom: Animalia
- Phylum: Arthropoda
- Clade: Pancrustacea
- Class: Insecta
- Order: Lepidoptera
- Family: Crambidae
- Subfamily: Spilomelinae
- Tribe: Trichaeini; Mally et al., 2019

= Trichaeini =

Tribe of moths

Trichaeini is a tribe of the species-rich subfamily Spilomelinae in the pyraloid moth family Crambidae. The tribe was erected by Richard Mally, James E. Hayden, Christoph Neinhuis, Bjarte H. Jordal and Matthias Nuss in 2019.

== Description ==
Adult Trichaeini are characterised by a single synapomorphy in the male genitalia: a raised sclerotised ridge is present on the sacculus, running from the basal to the dorsodistal part. Further characteristics of Trichaeini are the weakly sclerotised, lens-shaped valvae, the strongly (in Trichaea and Archernis humilis) to weakly sclerotized fibula with simple hairs, and the scaly sacculus. In the female genitalia, the ductus bursae is broad, but narrowing at the posterior end, and the corpus bursae bears a slim longitudinal signum. In some Prophantis species, the anterior end of the signum is split into two anterolateral legs – a condition that is also found in Syngamia in the Nomophilini.

== Food plants ==
The caterpillars of Trichaeini primarily feed on plants of the Rubiaceae family. The coffee berry moths Prophantis longicornalis, P. octoguttalis and P. smaragdina are considered pests on Coffea arabica, the Arabian coffee. They are known to also feed on the Rubiaceae plants Bertiera zaluzania, Gardenia, Ixora coccinea and Tricalysia, the Verbenaceae Duranta plumieri, and Triclisia in the Menispermaceae. Trichaea larvae feed on species of Psychotria, on Morinda panamensis and Margaritopsis microdon (all Rubiaceae), but were also recorded from Urticaceae and Celastraceae. Recently, Archernis humilis was discovered to feed on the skunk vine Paederia foetida. It was investigated as a potential biological control agent against this invasive plant species in North America, but was found to not be hostplant-specific enough for this purpose, as the caterpillars also feed on the North American endemic Paederia ciliata.

== Distribution ==
The species of Archernis and Prophantis are distributed in the tropics and subtropics of Australia and the Old World, i.e., Africa and Asia. The species of the other three genera are found in the tropics and subtropics of the Americas.

== Systematics ==
The tribe currently comprises 36 species in five genera:

- Archernis Meyrick, 1886
- Prophantis Warren, 1896
- Sacculosia Amsel, 1956
- Trichaea Herrich-Schäffer, 1866 (synonyms Acridura Butler, 1875, Phryctena Oberthür, 1881)
- Zenamorpha Amsel, 1956

The larval feeding on Rubiaceae is shared with the tribe Nomophilini, which might be the sister group of Trichaeini.
