= Prionopaltis consocia =

Scientific classification
- Domain: Eukaryota
- Kingdom: Animalia
- Phylum: Arthropoda
- Class: Insecta
- Order: Lepidoptera
- Family: Crambidae
- Genus: Prionopaltis
- Species: P. consocia

Binomial name
- Prionopaltis consocia Warren, 1892

Species of moth

Prionopaltis consocia is a moth in the family Crambidae. It was described by William Warren in 1892. It is found in Japan.

The wingspan is about 26 mm. Adults are similar to Prionopaltis sericea, but the forewings are less broad and the costa is straighter towards the apex. The forewings are silky brown, but the pale subcostal patch at the beginning of the second line is larger, more distinctly tridentate behind and the end of the line on the inner margin is distinctly marked as a small angulated blotch. The base of the reniform stigma is marked by a minute yellowish dot.
