= Coelorhyncidia elathealis =

Scientific classification
- Domain: Eukaryota
- Kingdom: Animalia
- Phylum: Arthropoda
- Class: Insecta
- Order: Lepidoptera
- Family: Crambidae
- Subfamily: Spilomelinae
- Genus: Coelorhyncidia
- Species: C. elathealis

Binomial name
- Coelorhyncidia elathealis (Walker, 1859)

Synonyms
- Botys elathealis Walker, 1859; Lygropia neglectalis Lederer, 1863

Species of moth

Coelorhyncidia elathealis is a moth in the family Crambidae. It was described by Francis Walker in 1859. It is found in Brazil.
