= Coelorhyncidia ovulalis =

Scientific classification
- Domain: Eukaryota
- Kingdom: Animalia
- Phylum: Arthropoda
- Class: Insecta
- Order: Lepidoptera
- Family: Crambidae
- Subfamily: Spilomelinae
- Genus: Coelorhyncidia
- Species: C. ovulalis

Binomial name
- Coelorhyncidia ovulalis Hampson, 1896

Species of moth

Coelorhyncidia ovulalis is a moth in the family Crambidae. It was described by George Hampson in 1896. It is found in India in Himachal Pradesh, Simla and Dharmsala.

The wingspan is about 28 mm. The forewings are fuscous black with a curved dark antemedial line and a whitish postmedial oval patch. There is an obscure curved postmedial line on the hindwings.
