= Arxama subcervinalis =

Scientific classification
- Domain: Eukaryota
- Kingdom: Animalia
- Phylum: Arthropoda
- Class: Insecta
- Order: Lepidoptera
- Family: Crambidae
- Subfamily: Spilomelinae
- Genus: Arxama
- Species: A. subcervinalis

Binomial name
- Arxama subcervinalis Walker, 1866

Species of moth

Arxama subcervinalis is a moth in the family Crambidae. It was described by Francis Walker in 1866. It is found on Seram in Indonesia.
