= Coelorhyncidia flammealis =

Scientific classification
- Domain: Eukaryota
- Kingdom: Animalia
- Phylum: Arthropoda
- Class: Insecta
- Order: Lepidoptera
- Family: Crambidae
- Subfamily: Spilomelinae
- Genus: Coelorhyncidia
- Species: C. flammealis

Binomial name
- Coelorhyncidia flammealis Hampson, 1917

Species of moth

Coelorhyncidia flammealis is a moth in the family Crambidae. It is found in Ecuador.
