= Paramecyna =

Paramecyna may refer to:

- Paramecyna (beetle) Aurivillius, 1908, a genus of beetles in the family Cerambycidae
- Paramecyna (moth) Amsel, 1961, a genus of moths in the family Crambidae
