= Arxama cretacealis =

Scientific classification
- Domain: Eukaryota
- Kingdom: Animalia
- Phylum: Arthropoda
- Class: Insecta
- Order: Lepidoptera
- Family: Crambidae
- Subfamily: Spilomelinae
- Genus: Arxama
- Species: A. cretacealis

Binomial name
- Arxama cretacealis Hampson, 1906

Species of moth

Arxama cretacealis is a moth in the family Crambidae. It was described by George Hampson in 1906. It is found on the Solomon Islands.
