= Arxama ochracealis =

Scientific classification
- Kingdom: Animalia
- Phylum: Arthropoda
- Clade: Pancrustacea
- Class: Insecta
- Order: Lepidoptera
- Family: Crambidae
- Subfamily: Spilomelinae
- Genus: Arxama
- Species: A. ochracealis

Binomial name
- Arxama ochracealis Hampson, 1906

Species of moth

Arxama ochracealis is a moth in the family Crambidae. It was described by George Hampson in 1906. It is found on Borneo.
