= Eudaemon (disambiguation) =

Eudaemon was an ancient city in Arabia, modern day Aden.

Eudaemon or Eudaimonia may also refer to:

- Eudaemon (mythology), a type of daemon in Greek mythology
- Eudaimonia, a concept in Aristotelian ethics and political philosophy
- Eudaemons, a 1970s group of physicists named after the Aristotelian concept
- Eudaemonia (moth), a genus of moths native to sub-Saharan Africa

== See also ==
- Eudaimonisma, a genus of moths native to Australia
