= Coelorhyncidia trifidalis =

Scientific classification
- Kingdom: Animalia
- Phylum: Arthropoda
- Class: Insecta
- Order: Lepidoptera
- Family: Crambidae
- Subfamily: Spilomelinae
- Genus: Coelorhyncidia
- Species: C. trifidalis

Binomial name
- Coelorhyncidia trifidalis Hampson, 1897

Species of moth

Coelorhyncidia trifidalis is a moth in the family Crambidae. It was described by George Hampson in 1897. It is found on Ambon Island in Indonesia.

The wingspan is about 18 mm. The forewings are fuscous with a slight purple gloss and with a whitish antemedial line, a speck in the cell and a discoidal quadrate white spot. There are white spots in and at the end of the cell of the hindwings, as well as a white line from below the end of the cell to the inner margin and a postmedial white spot.
