= Praeacrospila patricialis =

Scientific classification
- Domain: Eukaryota
- Kingdom: Animalia
- Phylum: Arthropoda
- Class: Insecta
- Order: Lepidoptera
- Family: Crambidae
- Genus: Praeacrospila
- Species: P. patricialis

Binomial name
- Praeacrospila patricialis (Schaus, 1912)

Synonyms
- Phryganodes patricialis Schaus, 1912

Species of moth

Praeacrospila patricialis is a moth in the family Crambidae. It was described by William Schaus in 1912. It is found in Costa Rica.

The wingspan is about 34 mm. The forewings are pale yellow and thinly scaled, the costa shaded (darkest at the base). There is a fuscous basal spot on the costa and a subbasal spot in the cell, as well as an antemedial, wavy, oblique, fuscous line, followed by a small annular spot in the cell. The submedian is brownish and a short line is found medially below it to the antemedial. There are two dark lines at the end of the cell, connected with the postmedial by a single line. The terminal area from the postmedial is more heavily scaled and purplish brown, enclosing a small yellow spot close to the postmedial below vein 2 and one on the inner margin. The hindwings are semihyaline pale yellow, shaded with brown at the apex. There is a postmedial dark lunular line from the costa to vein 2.
