= Plantegumia leptidalis =

Scientific classification
- Kingdom: Animalia
- Phylum: Arthropoda
- Class: Insecta
- Order: Lepidoptera
- Family: Crambidae
- Genus: Plantegumia
- Species: P. leptidalis

Binomial name
- Plantegumia leptidalis (Hampson, 1913)

Synonyms
- Pionea leptidalis Hampson, 1913

Species of moth

Plantegumia leptidalis is a moth in the family Crambidae. It was described by George Hampson in 1913. It is found in Paraguay.
