= Physematia defloralis =

Scientific classification
- Kingdom: Animalia
- Phylum: Arthropoda
- Class: Insecta
- Order: Lepidoptera
- Family: Crambidae
- Genus: Physematia
- Species: P. defloralis

Binomial name
- Physematia defloralis Strand, 1919

Species of moth

Physematia defloralis is a species of moth in the family Crambidae. It was described by Strand in 1919. It is found in Taiwan.
