= Pylartes subcostalis =

Scientific classification
- Kingdom: Animalia
- Phylum: Arthropoda
- Class: Insecta
- Order: Lepidoptera
- Family: Crambidae
- Genus: Pylartes
- Species: P. subcostalis

Binomial name
- Pylartes subcostalis Walker, 1863

Species of moth

Pylartes subcostalis is a moth in the family Crambidae. It was described by Francis Walker in 1863. It is found on Borneo.
