= Cirrhocephalina eucharisalis =

Scientific classification
- Kingdom: Animalia
- Phylum: Arthropoda
- Class: Insecta
- Order: Lepidoptera
- Family: Crambidae
- Genus: Cirrhocephalina
- Species: C. eucharisalis

Binomial name
- Cirrhocephalina eucharisalis (Walker, 1859)

Synonyms
- Botys eucharisalis Walker, 1859

Species of moth

Cirrhocephalina eucharisalis is a moth in the family Crambidae. It was described by Francis Walker in 1859. It is found in Tefé, Brazil.
