= Pylartes totuanalis =

Scientific classification
- Domain: Eukaryota
- Kingdom: Animalia
- Phylum: Arthropoda
- Class: Insecta
- Order: Lepidoptera
- Family: Crambidae
- Genus: Pylartes
- Species: P. totuanalis

Binomial name
- Pylartes totuanalis (Schaus, 1927)

Synonyms
- Cliniodes totuanalis Schaus, 1927

Species of moth

Pylartes totuanalis is a moth in the family Crambidae. It was described by Schaus in 1927. It is found in the Philippines (Luzon).

The wingspan is about 27 mm. The forewings are silvery drab, tinged with olivaceous. The costa is yellow ocher with a dark shade from the base to near the middle. Below the subcostal area, is a silvery white line to near the apex with a projecting small triangular white spot at the end of the cell. The hindwings have a silvery white costa, but are otherwise suffused with light drab.
