= Ommatobotys =

Scientific classification
- Domain: Eukaryota
- Kingdom: Animalia
- Phylum: Arthropoda
- Class: Insecta
- Order: Lepidoptera
- Family: Crambidae
- Subfamily: Spilomelinae
- Genus: Ommatobotys; J. C. Shaffer & Munroe, 2007

Genus of moths

Ommatobotys is a genus of moths of the family Crambidae.

== Species ==
- Ommatobotys aldabralis (Viette, 1958)
- Ommatobotys ommatalis (Hampson, 1912)
