= Cirrhocephalina evanidalis =

Scientific classification
- Kingdom: Animalia
- Phylum: Arthropoda
- Class: Insecta
- Order: Lepidoptera
- Family: Crambidae
- Genus: Cirrhocephalina
- Species: C. evanidalis

Binomial name
- Cirrhocephalina evanidalis (Schaus, 1912)

Synonyms
- Phryganodes evanidalis Schaus, 1912

Species of moth

Cirrhocephalina evanidalis is a moth in the family Crambidae. It was described by Schaus in 1912. It is found in Costa Rica.
