= Sedenia cervalis =

Scientific classification
- Domain: Eukaryota
- Kingdom: Animalia
- Phylum: Arthropoda
- Class: Insecta
- Order: Lepidoptera
- Family: Crambidae
- Genus: Sedenia
- Species: S. cervalis

Binomial name
- Sedenia cervalis Guenée, 1854

Synonyms
- Scopula itonusalis Walker, 1859; Scopula pictoalis Walker, 1859

Species of moth

Sedenia cervalis is a moth in the family Crambidae. It is found in Australia, where it has been recorded from South Australia and New South Wales.
