= Agrammia iridalis =

Scientific classification
- Kingdom: Animalia
- Phylum: Arthropoda
- Clade: Pancrustacea
- Class: Insecta
- Order: Lepidoptera
- Family: Crambidae
- Genus: Agrammia
- Species: A. iridalis

Binomial name
- Agrammia iridalis Guenée, 1854

Species of moth

Agrammia iridalis is a moth in the family Crambidae. It was described by Achille Guenée in 1854. It is found in French Guiana.
