= Sedenia rupalis =

Scientific classification
- Kingdom: Animalia
- Phylum: Arthropoda
- Class: Insecta
- Order: Lepidoptera
- Family: Crambidae
- Genus: Sedenia
- Species: S. rupalis

Binomial name
- Sedenia rupalis Guenée, 1854

Species of moth

Sedenia rupalis is a moth in the family Crambidae. It is found in Australia.
