= Trithyris janualis =

Scientific classification
- Domain: Eukaryota
- Kingdom: Animalia
- Phylum: Arthropoda
- Class: Insecta
- Order: Lepidoptera
- Family: Crambidae
- Genus: Trithyris
- Species: T. janualis

Binomial name
- Trithyris janualis Lederer, 1863

Species of moth

Trithyris janualis is a moth in the family Crambidae. It was described by Julius Lederer in 1863. It is found in Brazil.
