= Criophthona baliocrossa =

Scientific classification
- Kingdom: Animalia
- Phylum: Arthropoda
- Clade: Pancrustacea
- Class: Insecta
- Order: Lepidoptera
- Family: Crambidae
- Genus: Criophthona
- Species: C. baliocrossa

Binomial name
- Criophthona baliocrossa (Turner, 1913)

Synonyms
- Conoprora baliocrossa Turner, 1913

Species of moth

Criophthona baliocrossa is a moth in the family Crambidae. It was described by Turner in 1913. It is found in Australia, where it has been recorded from Queensland.

The wingspan is 17–20 mm. The forewings are fuscous mixed with whitish and darker along the costa and with dark-fuscous markings. The hindwings are fuscous. Adults have been recorded on wing in November.
