= Praephostria flavalis =

Scientific classification
- Domain: Eukaryota
- Kingdom: Animalia
- Phylum: Arthropoda
- Class: Insecta
- Order: Lepidoptera
- Family: Crambidae
- Genus: Praephostria
- Species: P. flavalis

Binomial name
- Praephostria flavalis Amsel, 1956

Species of moth

Praephostria flavalis is a moth in the family Crambidae. It was described by Hans Georg Amsel in 1956 and is found in Venezuela.
