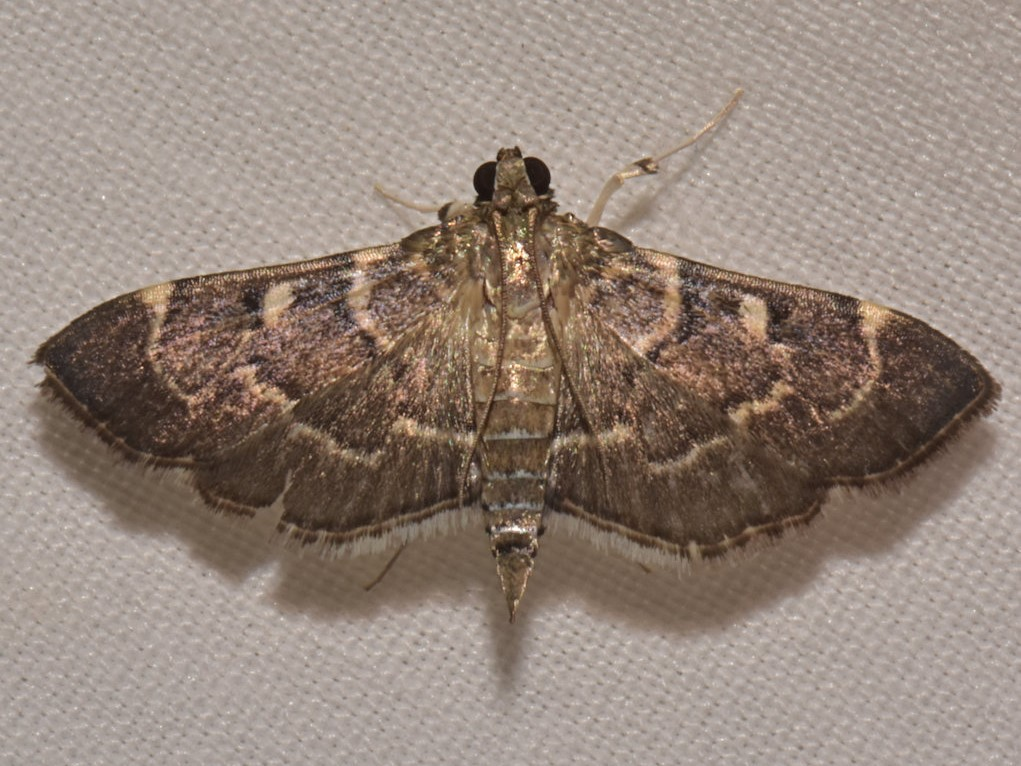

Scientific classification
- Kingdom: Animalia
- Phylum: Arthropoda
- Class: Insecta
- Order: Lepidoptera
- Family: Crambidae
- Tribe: Herpetogrammatini
- Genus: Cryptobotys; Munroe, 1956
- Species: C. zoilusalis

Binomial name
- Cryptobotys zoilusalis (Walker, 1859)

Synonyms
- List: Botys zoilusalis Walker, 1859; Botys hilaralis Möschler, 1886; Sylepta masculinalis Barnes & McDunnough, 1913; Syngamia micromphalis Hampson, 1912; Cryptobotys hilaralis (Möschler, 1886)

= Cryptobotys =

Cryptobotys zoilusalis

Genus of moths

Cryptobotys is a genus of moths in the family Crambidae described by Eugene G. Munroe in 1956. It is monotypic, with its only species, Cryptobotys zoilusalis, described by Francis Walker in 1859. It is found in Cuba, Jamaica, Puerto Rico, Central America (Honduras, Costa Rica, Mexico) and the southern United States, where it has been recorded from Florida.

== Description ==
Adults are cinereous (ash gray) with whitish interior and exterior lines, slightly bordered with brownish. The marginal line is brownish. Adults have been recorded on wing from February to August and from November to December in Florida.

== Behaviour and ecology ==
The larvae feed on Xanthium strumarium.
