= Cirrhocephalina venosa =

Scientific classification
- Kingdom: Animalia
- Phylum: Arthropoda
- Class: Insecta
- Order: Lepidoptera
- Family: Crambidae
- Genus: Cirrhocephalina
- Species: C. venosa

Binomial name
- Cirrhocephalina venosa (Lederer, 1863)

Synonyms
- Cirrhocephala venosa Lederer, 1863

Species of moth

Cirrhocephalina venosa is a moth in the family Crambidae. It was described by Julius Lederer in 1863. It is found in Cuba.
