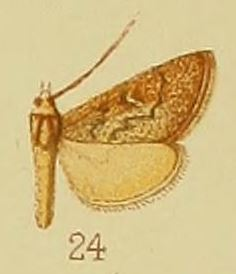

Scientific classification
- Kingdom: Animalia
- Phylum: Arthropoda
- Class: Insecta
- Order: Lepidoptera
- Family: Crambidae
- Genus: Criophthona
- Species: C. sabulosalis

Binomial name
- Criophthona sabulosalis Hampson, 1910

= Criophthona sabulosalis =

Species of moth

Criophthona sabulosalis is a moth belonging to the family Crambidae. It was described by George Hampson in 1910. It is found in Kenya and Zambia.
