= Physematia concordalis =

Scientific classification
- Domain: Eukaryota
- Kingdom: Animalia
- Phylum: Arthropoda
- Class: Insecta
- Order: Lepidoptera
- Family: Crambidae
- Genus: Physematia
- Species: P. concordalis

Binomial name
- Physematia concordalis Lederer, 1863

Species of moth

Physematia concordalis is a moth in the family Crambidae. It was described by Julius Lederer in 1863. It is found in India's Nicobar Islands.
