= Ceratarcha clathralis =

Scientific classification
- Kingdom: Animalia
- Phylum: Arthropoda
- Clade: Pancrustacea
- Class: Insecta
- Order: Lepidoptera
- Family: Crambidae
- Genus: Ceratarcha
- Species: C. clathralis

Binomial name
- Ceratarcha clathralis C. Swinhoe, 1894

Species of moth

Ceratarcha clathralis is a moth in the family Crambidae first described by Charles Swinhoe in 1894. It is found in the Indian state of Meghalaya.
