= Sedenia leucogramma =

Scientific classification
- Domain: Eukaryota
- Kingdom: Animalia
- Phylum: Arthropoda
- Class: Insecta
- Order: Lepidoptera
- Family: Crambidae
- Genus: Sedenia
- Species: S. leucogramma

Binomial name
- Sedenia leucogramma Turner, 1937

Species of moth

Sedenia leucogramma is a moth in the family Crambidae. It is found in Australia.
