= Criophthona haliaphra =

Scientific classification
- Kingdom: Animalia
- Phylum: Arthropoda
- Class: Insecta
- Order: Lepidoptera
- Family: Crambidae
- Genus: Criophthona
- Species: C. haliaphra

Binomial name
- Criophthona haliaphra Meyrick, 1884

Species of moth

Criophthona haliaphra is a moth in the family Crambidae. It was described by Edward Meyrick in 1884. It is found in Australia, where it has been recorded from New South Wales.

The wingspan is about 13 mm. The forewings are white with scattered dark fuscous scales and ochreous-fuscous markings, irrorated (sprinkled) with dark fuscous. The hindwings are fuscous grey, but paler towards the base.
