= Plantegumia flavaginalis =

Scientific classification
- Kingdom: Animalia
- Phylum: Arthropoda
- Class: Insecta
- Order: Lepidoptera
- Family: Crambidae
- Genus: Plantegumia
- Species: P. flavaginalis

Binomial name
- Plantegumia flavaginalis (Hedemann, 1894)

Synonyms
- Pyrausta flavaginalis Hedemann, 1894; Hapalia flaviginalis Schaus, 1940

Species of moth

Plantegumia flavaginalis is a moth in the family Crambidae. It is found on the Virgin Islands.
