= Arxama =

Scientific classification
- Kingdom: Animalia
- Phylum: Arthropoda
- Class: Insecta
- Order: Lepidoptera
- Family: Crambidae
- Subfamily: Spilomelinae
- Genus: Arxama; Walker, 1866

Genus of moths

Arxama is a genus of moths of the family Crambidae.

== Species ==
- Arxama atralis Hampson, 1897
- Arxama cretacealis Hampson, 1906
- Arxama ochracealis Hampson, 1906
- Arxama subcervinalis Walker, 1866
