= Eurybela trophoessa =

Scientific classification
- Domain: Eukaryota
- Kingdom: Animalia
- Phylum: Arthropoda
- Class: Insecta
- Order: Lepidoptera
- Family: Crambidae
- Genus: Eurybela
- Species: E. trophoessa

Binomial name
- Eurybela trophoessa (Turner, 1908)

Synonyms
- Metasia trophoessa Turner, 1908

Species of moth

Eurybela trophoessa is a moth in the family Crambidae. It was described by Turner in 1908. It is found in Australia, where it has been recorded from Queensland and New South Wales.
