= Eurybela scotopis =

Scientific classification
- Domain: Eukaryota
- Kingdom: Animalia
- Phylum: Arthropoda
- Class: Insecta
- Order: Lepidoptera
- Family: Crambidae
- Genus: Eurybela
- Species: E. scotopis

Binomial name
- Eurybela scotopis Turner, 1908

Species of moth

Eurybela scotopis is a moth in the family Crambidae. It was described by Turner in 1908. It is found in Australia, where it has been recorded from Queensland.

The wingspan is about 25 mm. The forewings are fuscous, mixed with ochreous-whitish with dark-fuscous markings. The hindwings are fuscous with an indistinct darker line.
