= Plantegumia venezuelensis =

Scientific classification
- Kingdom: Animalia
- Phylum: Arthropoda
- Class: Insecta
- Order: Lepidoptera
- Family: Crambidae
- Genus: Plantegumia
- Species: P. venezuelensis

Binomial name
- Plantegumia venezuelensis Amsel, 1956

Species of moth

Plantegumia venezuelensis is a moth in the family Crambidae. It was described by Hans Georg Amsel in 1956 and is found in Venezuela.
