= Criophthona finitima =

Scientific classification
- Kingdom: Animalia
- Phylum: Arthropoda
- Class: Insecta
- Order: Lepidoptera
- Family: Crambidae
- Genus: Criophthona
- Species: C. finitima

Binomial name
- Criophthona finitima Meyrick, 1884

Species of moth

Criophthona finitima is a moth in the family Crambidae. It was described by Edward Meyrick in 1884. It is found in Australia, where it has been recorded in South Australia.

The wingspan is about 15 mm. The forewings are light grey, irrorated (sprinkled) with black and suffused with darker grey towards the costa. The lines are cloudy dark grey and there is a small cloudy whitish spot on the costa and a cloudy whitish discal spot with a dark margin. The hindwings are grey, somewhat lighter towards the base. Adults have been recorded on wing in October.
