= Coelorhyncidia =

Scientific classification
- Domain: Eukaryota
- Kingdom: Animalia
- Phylum: Arthropoda
- Class: Insecta
- Order: Lepidoptera
- Family: Crambidae
- Subfamily: Spilomelinae
- Genus: Coelorhyncidia; Hampson, 1896

Genus of moths

Coelorhyncidia is a genus of moths of the family Crambidae.

== Species ==
- Coelorhyncidia elathealis (Walker, 1859)
- Coelorhyncidia flammealis Hampson, 1917
- Coelorhyncidia nitidalis Hampson, 1907
- Coelorhyncidia ovulalis Hampson, 1896
- Coelorhyncidia purpurea Hampson, 1907
- Coelorhyncidia trifidalis Hampson, 1897
