= Plantegumia =

Scientific classification
- Kingdom: Animalia
- Phylum: Arthropoda
- Class: Insecta
- Order: Lepidoptera
- Family: Crambidae
- Subfamily: Glaphyriinae
- Genus: Plantegumia; Amsel, 1956

Genus of moths

Plantegumia is a genus of moths of the family Crambidae. The three described species are distributed in Central and South America.

The genus was formerly treated in Spilomelinae, but is now placed in Glaphyriinae.

== Species ==
- Plantegumia flavaginalis (Hedemann, 1894)
- Plantegumia leptidalis (Hampson, 1913)
- Plantegumia venezuelensis Amsel, 1956
