= Sedenia achroa =

Scientific classification
- Domain: Eukaryota
- Kingdom: Animalia
- Phylum: Arthropoda
- Class: Insecta
- Order: Lepidoptera
- Family: Crambidae
- Genus: Sedenia
- Species: S. achroa

Binomial name
- Sedenia achroa Lower, 1902

Synonyms
- Sedenia leucopepla Turner, 1905

Species of moth

Sedenia achroa is a moth in the family Crambidae described by Oswald Bertram Lower in 1902. It is found in Australia, where it has been recorded from Western Australia.

The wingspan is about 22 mm. The forewings are greyish fuscous, strongly mixed with ochreous fuscous. There is a moderately thick obscure line from the costa to the inner margin and a line from costa to below the middle of the wing, which is then strongly curved inwards. There is an obscure fuscous subterminal line. The hindwings are light grey, somewhat fuscous tinged along the margins. There is a suffused fuscous line from the costa towards the inner margin and a similar line from the costa nearly to the anal angle, which is continued shortly above termen from there.
