= Cirrhocephalina flaviceps =

Scientific classification
- Kingdom: Animalia
- Phylum: Arthropoda
- Class: Insecta
- Order: Lepidoptera
- Family: Crambidae
- Genus: Cirrhocephalina
- Species: C. flaviceps

Binomial name
- Cirrhocephalina flaviceps (Hampson, 1918)

Synonyms
- Phostria flaviceps Hampson, 1918

Species of moth

Cirrhocephalina flaviceps is a moth in the family Crambidae. It was described by George Hampson in 1918. It is found in Peru.
