= Praephostria sylleptalis =

Scientific classification
- Domain: Eukaryota
- Kingdom: Animalia
- Phylum: Arthropoda
- Class: Insecta
- Order: Lepidoptera
- Family: Crambidae
- Genus: Praephostria
- Species: P. sylleptalis

Binomial name
- Praephostria sylleptalis Amsel, 1956

Species of moth

Praephostria sylleptalis is a moth in the family Crambidae found in Venezuela. It was described by Hans Georg Amsel in 1956.
