= Praeacrospila =

Scientific classification
- Domain: Eukaryota
- Kingdom: Animalia
- Phylum: Arthropoda
- Class: Insecta
- Order: Lepidoptera
- Family: Crambidae
- Subfamily: Spilomelinae
- Genus: Praeacrospila; Amsel, 1956

Genus of moths

Praeacrospila is a genus of moths of the family Crambidae described by Hans Georg Amsel in 1956.

== Species ==
- Praeacrospila melanoproctis Hampson, 1899
- Praeacrospila patricialis (Schaus, 1912)
- Praeacrospila pellucidalis (Dognin, 1904)
- Praeacrospila xiphialis (Walker, 1859)
