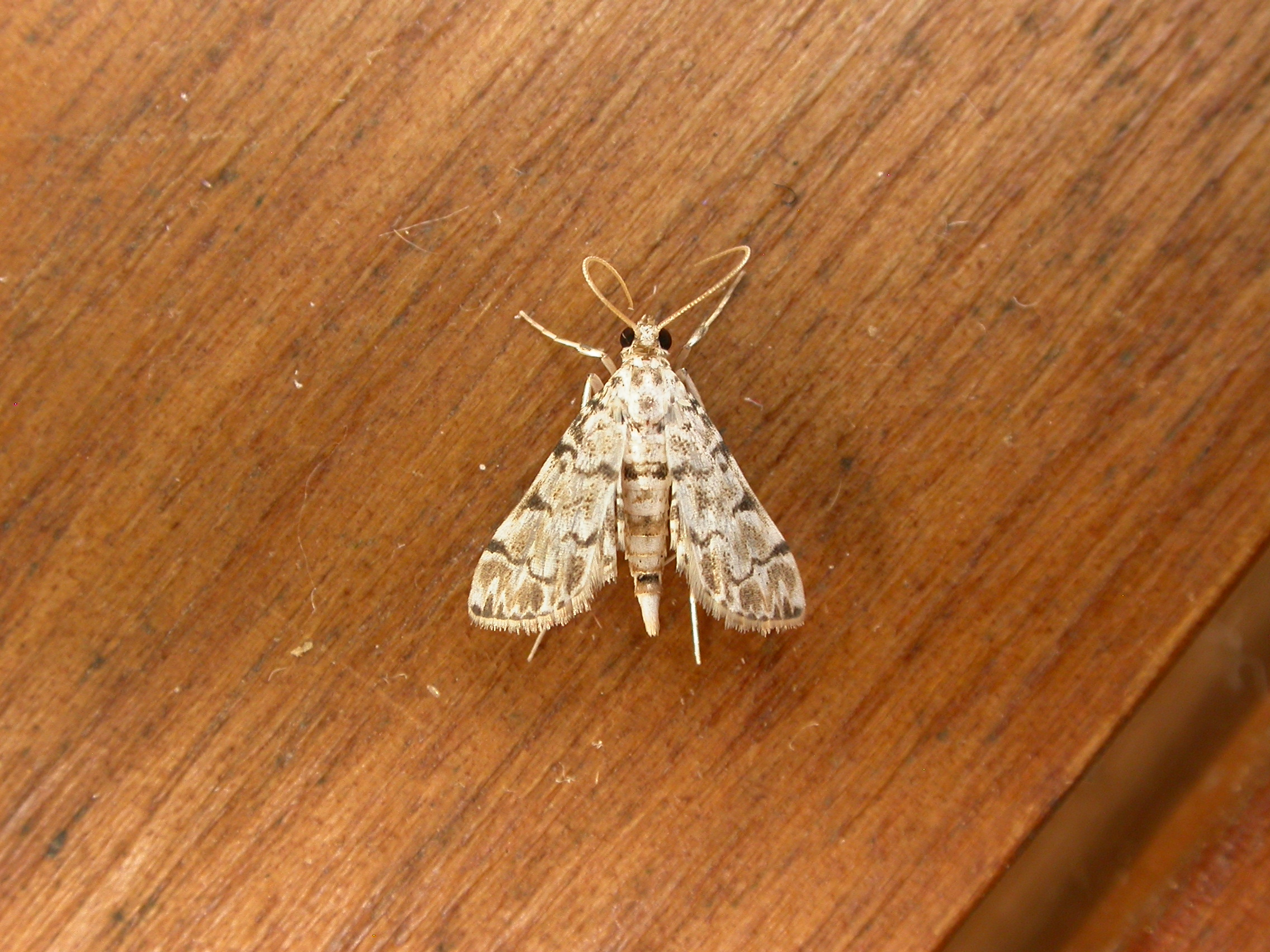

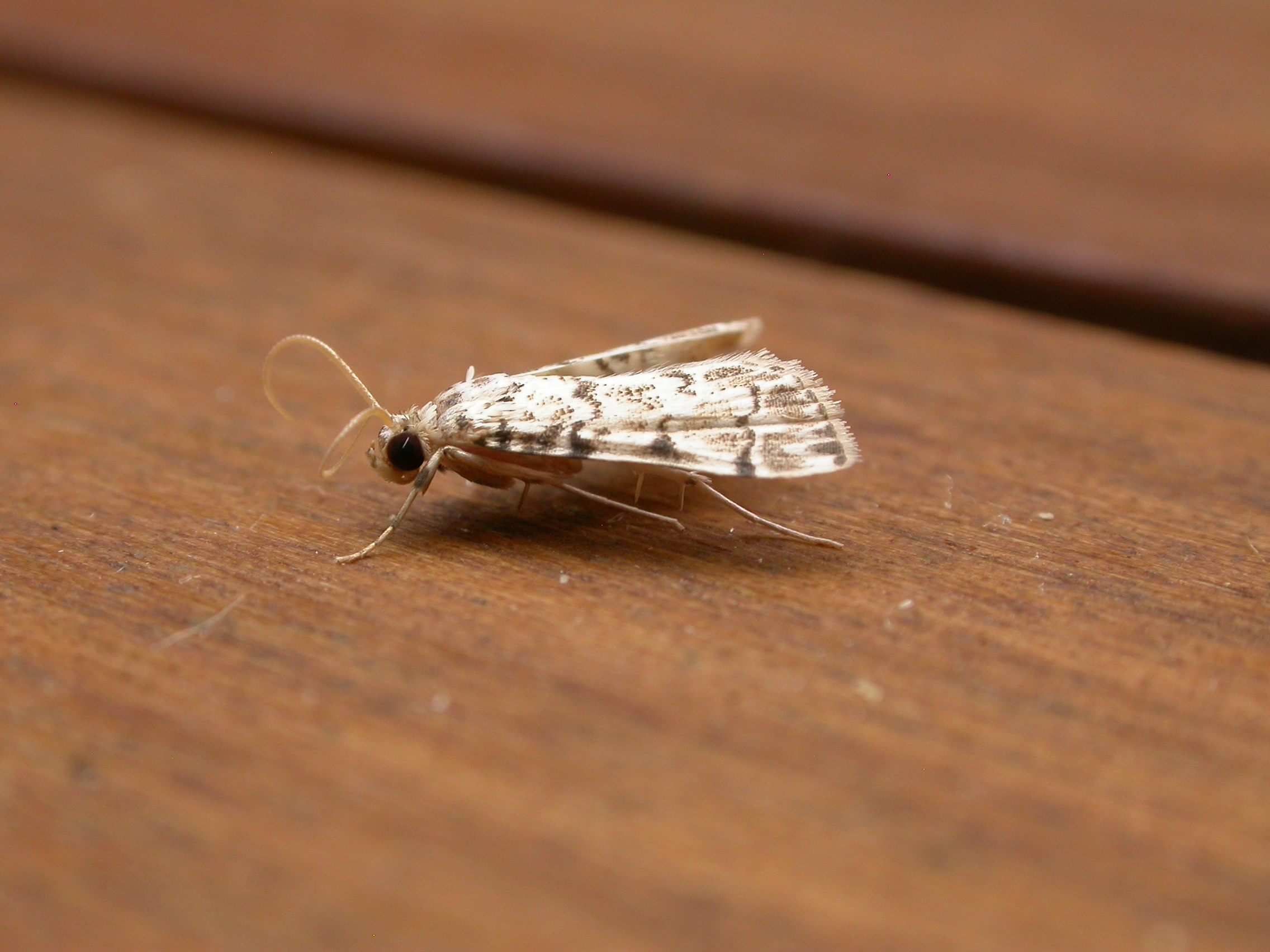

Scientific classification
- Kingdom: Animalia
- Phylum: Arthropoda
- Clade: Pancrustacea
- Class: Insecta
- Order: Lepidoptera
- Family: Crambidae
- Subfamily: Spilomelinae
- Tribe: Herpetogrammatini
- Genus: Metoeca; Warren, 1896
- Species: M. foedalis

Binomial name
- Metoeca foedalis (Guenée, 1854)

Synonyms
- Isopteryx foedalis Guenée, 1854; Isopteryx tenellalis Guenée, 1854; Isopteryx leucothoalis Walker, 1859; Isopteryx spilomelalis Walker, 1859; Zebronia oethonalis Walker, 1859; Hydrocampa scitalis Lederer, 1863; Physematia epispila Meyrick, 1886; Nymphula pseudofoedalis Strand, 1913; Nymphula cantonalis Caradja, 1925

= Metoeca =

Genus of moths

Metoeca is a genus of moths of the family Crambidae. It contains only one species Metoeca foedalis, which has a wide distribution, including the Democratic Republic of Congo, Equatorial Guinea, South Africa, China, Japan, Taiwan, Thailand, Myanmar and Australia (Queensland).

The wingspan is about 15 mm. Adult are white with dark brown dots and lines and pale brown blobs.

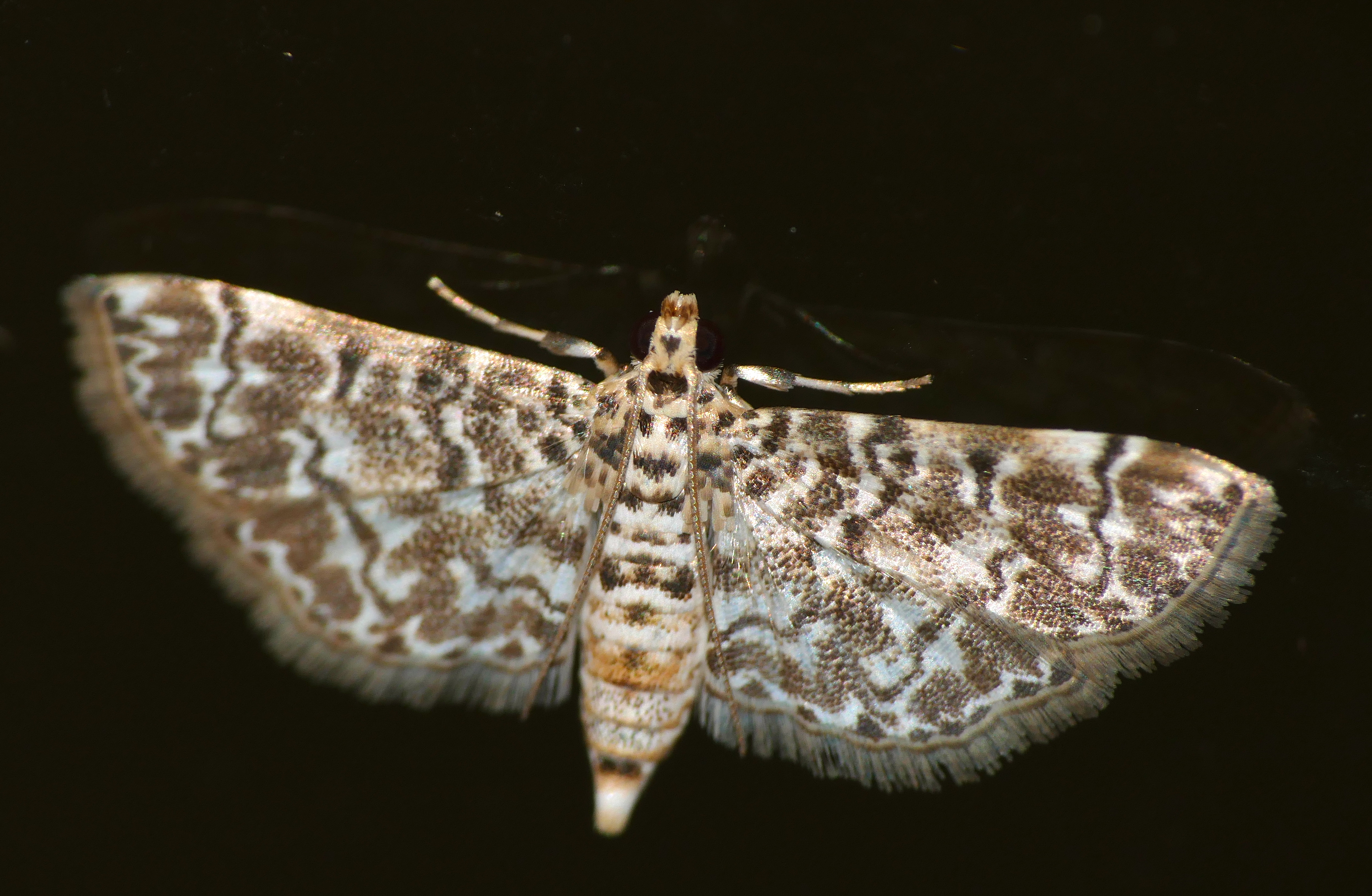
