= Trithyris flavifimbria =

Scientific classification
- Domain: Eukaryota
- Kingdom: Animalia
- Phylum: Arthropoda
- Class: Insecta
- Order: Lepidoptera
- Family: Crambidae
- Genus: Trithyris
- Species: T. flavifimbria

Binomial name
- Trithyris flavifimbria Dognin, 1905

Species of moth

Trithyris flavifimbria is a moth in the family Crambidae. It was described by Paul Dognin in 1905. It is found in Loja Province, Ecuador.
