= Praephostria =

Scientific classification
- Kingdom: Animalia
- Phylum: Arthropoda
- Class: Insecta
- Order: Lepidoptera
- Family: Crambidae
- Subfamily: Spilomelinae
- Genus: Praephostria; Amsel, 1956

Genus of moths

Praephostria is a genus of moths of the family Crambidae described by Hans Georg Amsel in 1956.

== Species ==
- Praephostria flavalis Amsel, 1956
- Praephostria sylleptalis Amsel, 1956
