= Sedenia aspasta =

Scientific classification
- Kingdom: Animalia
- Phylum: Arthropoda
- Class: Insecta
- Order: Lepidoptera
- Family: Crambidae
- Genus: Sedenia
- Species: S. aspasta

Binomial name
- Sedenia aspasta Meyrick, 1887

Species of moth

Sedenia aspasta is a moth in the family Crambidae. It is found in Australia, where it has been recorded from Western Australia.
