= Cissachroa =

Scientific classification
- Domain: Eukaryota
- Kingdom: Animalia
- Phylum: Arthropoda
- Class: Insecta
- Order: Lepidoptera
- Family: Crambidae
- Subfamily: Spilomelinae
- Genus: Cissachroa; Turner, 1937
- Species: C. callischema

Binomial name
- Cissachroa callischema Turner, 1937

Genus of moths

Cissachroa is a monotypic moth genus of the family Crambidae described by Alfred Jefferis Turner in 1937. Its only species, Cissachroa callischema, described in the same article, is found in Australia.
