= Cirrhocephalina =

Scientific classification
- Kingdom: Animalia
- Phylum: Arthropoda
- Class: Insecta
- Order: Lepidoptera
- Family: Crambidae
- Subfamily: Spilomelinae
- Genus: Cirrhocephalina; Munroe, 1995

Synonyms
- Cirrhocephala Lederer, 1863

Genus of moths

Cirrhocephalina is a genus of moths of the family Crambidae.

== Species ==
- Cirrhocephalina brunneivena (Hampson, 1913)
- Cirrhocephalina eucharisalis (Walker, 1859)
- Cirrhocephalina evanidalis (Schaus, 1912)
- Cirrhocephalina flaviceps (Hampson, 1918)
- Cirrhocephalina venosa (Lederer, 1863)
