= Sedenia polydesma =

Scientific classification
- Domain: Eukaryota
- Kingdom: Animalia
- Phylum: Arthropoda
- Class: Insecta
- Order: Lepidoptera
- Family: Crambidae
- Genus: Sedenia
- Species: S. polydesma

Binomial name
- Sedenia polydesma Lower, 1900

Species of moth

Sedenia polydesma is a moth in the family Crambidae. It is found in Australia, where it has been recorded from New South Wales.

The wingspan is about 16 mm. The forewings are grey whitish, sprinkled with ochreous-fuscous scales, which tend to form three moderate transverse fasciae. The hindwings are light fuscous, with two darker fuscous transverse fasciae and a fine line of fuscous scales along the hindmargin.
