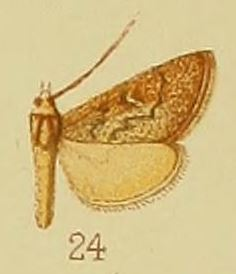
- Criophthona sabulosalis

Scientific classification
- Kingdom: Animalia
- Phylum: Arthropoda
- Class: Insecta
- Order: Lepidoptera
- Family: Crambidae
- Subfamily: Spilomelinae
- Genus: Criophthona; Meyrick, 1884

Synonyms
- Conoprora Turner, 1913

= Criophthona =

Genus of moths

Criophthona is a genus of moths of the family Crambidae.

== Species ==
- Criophthona anerasmia (Turner, 1913)
- Criophthona aridalis Hampson, 1913
- Criophthona baliocrossa (Turner, 1913)
- Criophthona celidota (Turner, 1913)
- Criophthona ecista Turner, 1913
- Criophthona finitima Meyrick, 1884
- Criophthona haliaphra Meyrick, 1884
- Criophthona sabulosalis Hampson, 1910
- Criophthona trileuca
