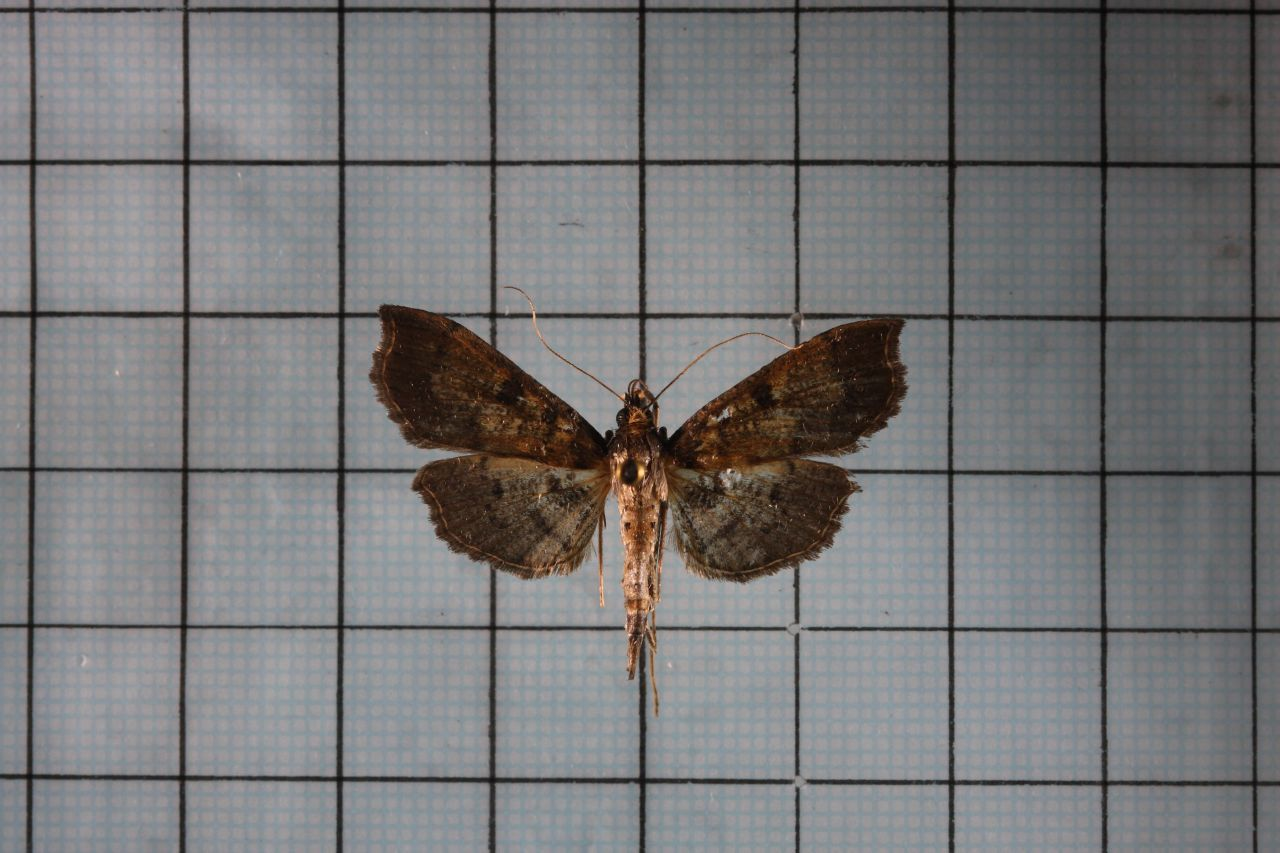

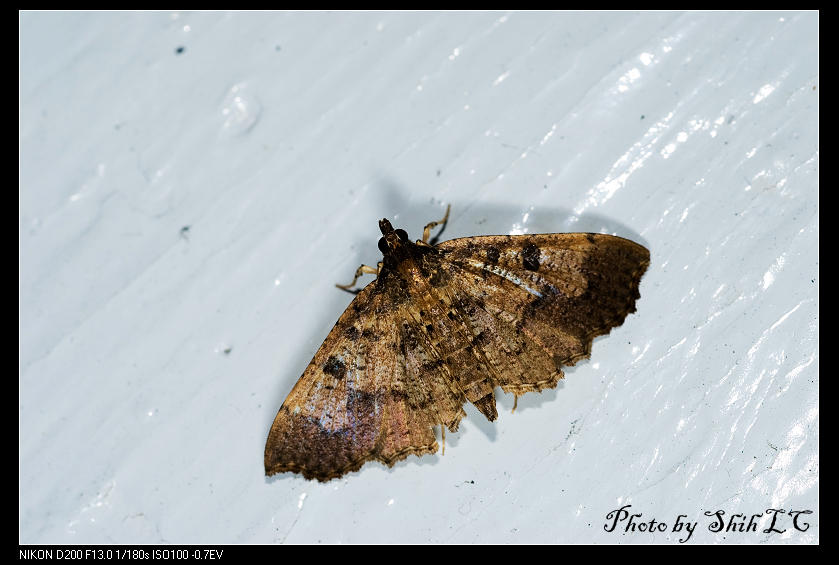

Scientific classification
- Kingdom: Animalia
- Phylum: Arthropoda
- Clade: Pancrustacea
- Class: Insecta
- Order: Lepidoptera
- Family: Crambidae
- Genus: Ceratarcha
- Species: C. umbrosa

Binomial name
- Ceratarcha umbrosa C. Swinhoe, 1894

= Ceratarcha umbrosa =

Species of moth

Ceratarcha umbrosa is a moth in the family Crambidae described by Charles Swinhoe in 1894. It is found in Asia, including China, Taiwan and India.

The wingspan is 33–37 mm.
