= Cirrhocephalina brunneivena =

Scientific classification
- Kingdom: Animalia
- Phylum: Arthropoda
- Class: Insecta
- Order: Lepidoptera
- Family: Crambidae
- Genus: Cirrhocephalina
- Species: C. brunneivena

Binomial name
- Cirrhocephalina brunneivena (Hampson, 1913)

Synonyms
- Polygrammodes brunneivena Hampson, 1913

Species of moth

Cirrhocephalina brunneivena is a moth in the family Crambidae. It was described by George Hampson in 1913. It is found in the Brazilian state of Amazonas and Honduras.
