= Ommatobotys ommatalis =

Scientific classification
- Kingdom: Animalia
- Phylum: Arthropoda
- Class: Insecta
- Order: Lepidoptera
- Family: Crambidae
- Genus: Ommatobotys
- Species: O. ommatalis

Binomial name
- Ommatobotys ommatalis (Hampson, 1912)

Synonyms
- Nacoleia ommatalis Hampson, 1912

Species of moth

Ommatobotys ommatalis is a moth in the family Crambidae. It was described by George Hampson in 1912. It is found in Kenya and South Africa.
