= Praeacrospila xiphialis =

Scientific classification
- Kingdom: Animalia
- Phylum: Arthropoda
- Class: Insecta
- Order: Lepidoptera
- Family: Crambidae
- Genus: Praeacrospila
- Species: P. xiphialis

Binomial name
- Praeacrospila xiphialis (Walker, 1859)

Synonyms
- Botys xiphialis Walker, 1859; Botys serratilinealis Klima, 1939

Species of moth

Praeacrospila xiphialis is a moth in the family of Crambidae. It was first described by Francis Walker in 1859. It is found in Rio de Janeiro, Brazil.
