= Criophthona anerasmia =

Scientific classification
- Domain: Eukaryota
- Kingdom: Animalia
- Phylum: Arthropoda
- Class: Insecta
- Order: Lepidoptera
- Family: Crambidae
- Genus: Criophthona
- Species: C. anerasmia

Binomial name
- Criophthona anerasmia (Turner, 1913)

Synonyms
- Conoprora anerasmia Turner, 1913

Species of moth

Criophthona anerasmia is a moth in the family Crambidae. It was described by Turner in 1913. It is found in Australia, where it has been recorded from the Northern Territory.

The wingspan is about 11 mm. The forewings are fuscous with a darker dot on the costa from which a faint dentate transverse line can be traced for a short distance. The hindwings are as the forewings. Adults have been recorded on wing in December.
