= Carthade =

Scientific classification
- Domain: Eukaryota
- Kingdom: Animalia
- Phylum: Arthropoda
- Class: Insecta
- Order: Lepidoptera
- Family: Crambidae
- Subfamily: Spilomelinae
- Genus: Carthade; Snellen, 1899
- Species: C. caecalis

Binomial name
- Carthade caecalis Snellen, 1899

Synonyms
- Chartade Neave, 1939

Genus of moths

Carthade is a genus of moths of the family Crambidae. It contains only one species, Carthade caecalis, which is found in Colombia.
