= Sedenia =

Scientific classification
- Domain: Eukaryota
- Kingdom: Animalia
- Phylum: Arthropoda
- Class: Insecta
- Order: Lepidoptera
- Family: Crambidae
- Subfamily: Spilomelinae
- Genus: Sedenia; Guenée, 1854

Genus of moths

Sedenia is a genus of moths of the family Crambidae described by Achille Guenée in 1854.

== Species ==
- Sedenia achroa Lower, 1902
- Sedenia aspasta Meyrick, 1887
- Sedenia atacta (Turner, 1942)
- Sedenia cervalis Guenée, 1854
- Sedenia erythrura Lower, 1893
- Sedenia leucogramma Turner, 1937
- Sedenia mesochorda Turner, 1917
- Sedenia polydesma Lower, 1900
- Sedenia rupalis Guenée, 1854
- Sedenia xeroscopa Lower, 1900
