= Physematia =

Scientific classification
- Kingdom: Animalia
- Phylum: Arthropoda
- Clade: Pancrustacea
- Class: Insecta
- Order: Lepidoptera
- Family: Crambidae
- Subfamily: Spilomelinae
- Genus: Physematia; Lederer, 1863

Genus of insects

Physematia is a genus of moths of the family Crambidae.

== Species ==
- Physematia concordalis Lederer, 1863
- Physematia defloralis Strand, 1919
