= Trithyris aethiopicalis =

Scientific classification
- Domain: Eukaryota
- Kingdom: Animalia
- Phylum: Arthropoda
- Class: Insecta
- Order: Lepidoptera
- Family: Crambidae
- Genus: Trithyris
- Species: T. aethiopicalis

Binomial name
- Trithyris aethiopicalis Ghesquière, 1942

Species of moth

Trithyris aethiopicalis is a moth in the family Crambidae. It was described by Jean Ghesquière in 1942. It is found in the area of the former province Équateur in the Democratic Republic of the Congo.
