= Microgeshna =

Scientific classification
- Kingdom: Animalia
- Phylum: Arthropoda
- Class: Insecta
- Order: Lepidoptera
- Family: Crambidae
- Subfamily: Spilomelinae
- Genus: Microgeshna; J. C. Shaffer & Munroe, 2007
- Species: M. laportei

Binomial name
- Microgeshna laportei (Legrand, 1966)

Synonyms
- Stenia laportei Legrand, 1966

Genus of moths

Microgeshna is a genus of moths of the family Crambidae. It contains only one species, Microgeshna laportei, which is found on the Seychelles, where it has been recorded from Aldabra.
