= Criophthona trileuca =

Scientific classification
- Domain: Eukaryota
- Kingdom: Animalia
- Phylum: Arthropoda
- Class: Insecta
- Order: Lepidoptera
- Family: Crambidae
- Genus: Criophthona
- Species: C. trileuca

Binomial name
- Criophthona trileuca Lower, 1903

Species of moth

Criophthona trileuca is a moth in the family Crambidae. It is found in Australia, where it has been recorded from Western Australia.

The wingspan is about 12 mm. The forewings are pale fuscous with three moderately thick waved dark fuscous transverse fasciae, as well as a small a snow-white spot near the base and a well-defined similar spot on the middle of the first fascia and a third similar spot on the middle of the second fascia. There is a fine dentate line along the termen. The hindwings are pale fuscous with a dark fuscous waved line from beneath the costa at three-fourths to the anal angle. There is a small fuscous mark on the inner margin at two-thirds and a line along the termen.
