= Prionopaltis =

Scientific classification
- Domain: Eukaryota
- Kingdom: Animalia
- Phylum: Arthropoda
- Class: Insecta
- Order: Lepidoptera
- Family: Crambidae
- Subfamily: Spilomelinae
- Genus: Prionopaltis; Warren, 1892

Type species
- Prionopaltis sericea Warren, 1892

Genus of moths

Prionopaltis is a genus of moths of the family Crambidae described by William Warren in 1892.

== Species ==
- Prionopaltis consocia Warren, 1892
- Prionopaltis sericea Warren, 1892
- Prionopaltis subdentalis Swinhoe, 1894
