= Leucochromodes bicoloralis =

Scientific classification
- Kingdom: Animalia
- Phylum: Arthropoda
- Class: Insecta
- Order: Lepidoptera
- Family: Crambidae
- Genus: Leucochromodes
- Species: L. bicoloralis

Binomial name
- Leucochromodes bicoloralis (Dyar, 1910)

Synonyms
- Ischnurges bicoloralis Dyar, 1910

Species of moth

Leucochromodes bicoloralis is a moth in the family Crambidae. It was described by Harrison Gray Dyar Jr. in 1910. It is found in Guyana.
