= Criophthona celidota =

Scientific classification
- Domain: Eukaryota
- Kingdom: Animalia
- Phylum: Arthropoda
- Class: Insecta
- Order: Lepidoptera
- Family: Crambidae
- Genus: Criophthona
- Species: C. celidota

Binomial name
- Criophthona celidota (Turner, 1913)

Synonyms
- Conoprora celidota Turner, 1913

Species of moth

Criophthona celidota is a moth in the family Crambidae. It was described by Turner in 1913. It is found in Australia, where it has been recorded from the Northern Territory.

The wingspan is about 9 mm. The forewings are dark-fuscous mixed with whitish and with obsolete lines. There is a quadrangular whitish blotch on the dorsum before the tornus and a median white dot in the disc above this, surrounded by fuscous. The hindwings are grey with an obscure whitish blotch in the disc above the tornus. Adults have been recorded on wing in December.
