= Sedenia erythrura =

Scientific classification
- Domain: Eukaryota
- Kingdom: Animalia
- Phylum: Arthropoda
- Class: Insecta
- Order: Lepidoptera
- Family: Crambidae
- Genus: Sedenia
- Species: S. erythrura

Binomial name
- Sedenia erythrura Lower, 1893

Species of moth

Sedenia erythrura is a moth in the family Crambidae. It is found in Australia, where it has been recorded from South Australia.
