= Leucochromodes euphthinylla =

Scientific classification
- Kingdom: Animalia
- Phylum: Arthropoda
- Class: Insecta
- Order: Lepidoptera
- Family: Crambidae
- Genus: Leucochromodes
- Species: L. euphthinylla

Binomial name
- Leucochromodes euphthinylla (Dyar, 1914)

Synonyms
- Leucochroma euphthinylla Dyar, 1914

Species of moth

Leucochromodes euphthinylla is a moth in the family Crambidae. It was described by Harrison Gray Dyar Jr. in 1914. It is found in Panama.
