= Praeacrospila melanoproctis =

Scientific classification
- Kingdom: Animalia
- Phylum: Arthropoda
- Class: Insecta
- Order: Lepidoptera
- Family: Crambidae
- Genus: Praeacrospila
- Species: P. melanoproctis

Binomial name
- Praeacrospila melanoproctis (Hampson, 1899)

Synonyms
- Pilocrocis melanoproctis Hampson, 1899

Species of moth

Praeacrospila melanoproctis is a moth in the family Crambidae. It was described by George Hampson in 1899. It was described from São Paulo, Brazil, but has also been recorded from Costa Rica and Cuba.

The wingspan is about 34 mm. The forewings are ochreous with a fuscous costal area. There is a sinuous dark antemedial line with a small annulus in the cell beyond it, as well as a large ochreous-centered discocellular reniform dark patch with a waved postmedial line with a large dark apical patch beyond it. There are two small ochreous spots on its outer edge. The hindwings are ochreous with a discocellular speck, as well as an apical dark patch and a series of marginal specks.
