= Leucochromodes trinitensis =

Scientific classification
- Kingdom: Animalia
- Phylum: Arthropoda
- Class: Insecta
- Order: Lepidoptera
- Family: Crambidae
- Genus: Leucochromodes
- Species: L. trinitensis

Binomial name
- Leucochromodes trinitensis (Hampson, 1912)

Synonyms
- Leucochroma trinitensis Hampson, 1912

Species of moth

Leucochromodes trinitensis is a moth in the family Crambidae. It was described by George Hampson in 1912. It is found in Trinidad.
