= Ommatobotys aldabralis =

Scientific classification
- Kingdom: Animalia
- Phylum: Arthropoda
- Class: Insecta
- Order: Lepidoptera
- Family: Crambidae
- Genus: Ommatobotys
- Species: O. aldabralis

Binomial name
- Ommatobotys aldabralis (Viette, 1958)

Synonyms
- Nacoleia aldabralis Viette, 1958

Species of moth

Ommatobotys aldabralis is a moth in the family Crambidae. It was described by Viette in 1958. It is found on the Seychelles (Aldabra, Assomption).
