= Sedenia xeroscopa =

Scientific classification
- Domain: Eukaryota
- Kingdom: Animalia
- Phylum: Arthropoda
- Class: Insecta
- Order: Lepidoptera
- Family: Crambidae
- Genus: Sedenia
- Species: S. xeroscopa

Binomial name
- Sedenia xeroscopa Lower, 1900

Species of moth

Sedenia xeroscopa is a moth in the family Crambidae. It is found in Australia, where it has been recorded from New South Wales.

The wingspan is 19–22 mm. The forewings are light ochreous-fuscous, darkest along the costa and hindmargin. There is an obscure, moderately straight dark fuscous line from the costa to the inner margin. There is a dull whitish spot on the costa and an obscure fuscous discal spot at the end of the cell. The hindwings are greyish with a fuscous discal spot and a gently curved fuscous line from the costa towards the inner margin.
