= Arxama atralis =

Scientific classification
- Kingdom: Animalia
- Phylum: Arthropoda
- Class: Insecta
- Order: Lepidoptera
- Family: Crambidae
- Genus: Arxama
- Species: A. atralis

Binomial name
- Arxama atralis Hampson, 1897

Species of moth

Arxama atralis is a moth in the family Crambidae. It was described by George Hampson in 1897. It is found in Malaysia.

The wingspan is about 16 mm. The forewings are black brown with a white speck at the base and a white subbasal line, as well as a nearly straight white antemedial line. The hindwings have a white antemedial line, as well as two white postmedial specks below the costa and a marginal orange band with a white lunule on the inner side below the costa.
