= Archernis humilis =

Scientific classification
- Domain: Eukaryota
- Kingdom: Animalia
- Phylum: Arthropoda
- Class: Insecta
- Order: Lepidoptera
- Family: Crambidae
- Subfamily: Spilomelinae
- Genus: Archernis
- Species: A. humilis

Binomial name
- Archernis humilis (C. Swinhoe, 1894)

Synonyms
- Protonoceras humilis C. Swinhoe, 1894

Species of moth

Archernis humilis is a moth in the family Crambidae. It was described by Charles Swinhoe in 1894. It is found in India.
