= Sedenia atacta =

Scientific classification
- Domain: Eukaryota
- Kingdom: Animalia
- Phylum: Arthropoda
- Class: Insecta
- Order: Lepidoptera
- Family: Crambidae
- Genus: Sedenia
- Species: S. atacta

Binomial name
- Sedenia atacta (Turner, 1942)

Synonyms
- Talis atacta Turner, 1942

Species of moth

Sedenia atacta is a moth in the family Crambidae. It is found in Australia, where it has been recorded from South Australia.
