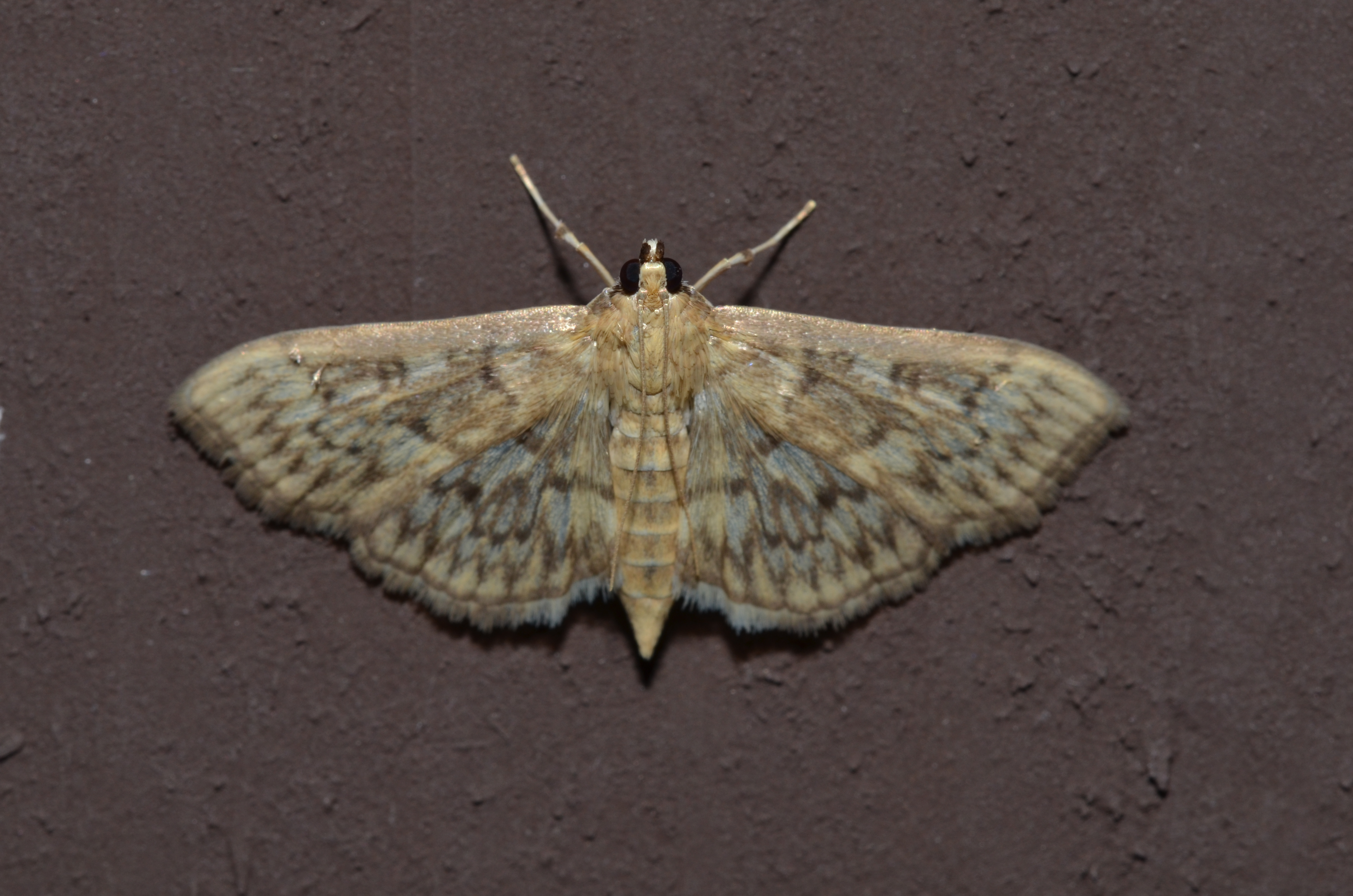
- Herpetogramma sp.

Scientific classification
- Kingdom: Animalia
- Phylum: Arthropoda
- Clade: Pancrustacea
- Class: Insecta
- Order: Lepidoptera
- Family: Crambidae
- Subfamily: Spilomelinae
- Tribe: Herpetogrammatini; Mally et al., 2019

= Herpetogrammatini =

Tribe of moths

Herpetogrammatini is a tribe of the species-rich subfamily Spilomelinae in the pyraloid moth family Crambidae. The tribe was erected by Richard Mally, James E. Hayden, Christoph Neinhuis, Bjarte H. Jordal and Matthias Nuss in 2019.

Seven genera, altogether comprising 286 species, are currently placed in Herpetogrammatini:

- Blepharomastix Lederer, 1863 (= Ichthyoptila Meyrick, 1936, Sozoa Walker, 1866)
- Cryptobotys Munroe, 1956
- Eurrhyparodes Snellen, 1880 (= Molybdantha Meyrick, 1884)
- Herpetogramma Lederer, 1863 (= Acharana Moore, 1885, Coremataria Amsel, 1956, Culcitaria Amsel, 1957, Macrobotys Munroe, 1950, Pachyzancla Meyrick, 1884, Pantoeocome Warren, 1896, Piloptila Swinhoe, 1894, Ptiloptila Hampson, 1899, Stenomelas Hampson, 1912, Stenomeles Warren, 1892)
- Hileithia Snellen, 1875
- Metoeca Warren, 1896
- Pilocrocis Lederer, 1863 (= Anisoctena Meyrick, 1894, Pilocrosis Janse, 1917)
