= Chromodes =

Scientific classification
- Domain: Eukaryota
- Kingdom: Animalia
- Phylum: Arthropoda
- Class: Insecta
- Order: Lepidoptera
- Family: Crambidae
- Subfamily: Spilomelinae
- Genus: Chromodes; Guenée, 1854
- Species: C. armeniacalis

Binomial name
- Chromodes armeniacalis Guenée, 1854

Genus of moths

Chromodes is a genus of moths of the family Crambidae. It contains only one species, Chromodes armeniacalis, which is found in Brazil.
