= Legrandellus =

Scientific classification
- Domain: Eukaryota
- Kingdom: Animalia
- Phylum: Arthropoda
- Class: Insecta
- Order: Lepidoptera
- Family: Crambidae
- Subfamily: Spilomelinae
- Genus: Legrandellus; J. C. Shaffer & Munroe, 2007
- Species: L. fuscolarosalis

Binomial name
- Legrandellus fuscolarosalis (Legrand, 1966)

Synonyms
- Pyrausta fuscolarosalis Legrand, 1966

Genus of moths

Legrandellus is a genus of moths of the family Crambidae. It contains only one species, Legrandellus fuscolarosalis, which is found on the Seychelles (Aldabra).
