= Leucochromodes melusinalis =

Scientific classification
- Kingdom: Animalia
- Phylum: Arthropoda
- Class: Insecta
- Order: Lepidoptera
- Family: Crambidae
- Genus: Leucochromodes
- Species: L. melusinalis

Binomial name
- Leucochromodes melusinalis (Walker, 1859)

Synonyms
- Leucochroma melusinalis Walker, 1859; Leucochroma meliusalis Dyar, 1914

Species of moth

Leucochromodes melusinalis is a moth in the family Crambidae. It was described by Francis Walker in 1859. It is found in Venezuela and Honduras.
