= Criophthona aridalis =

Scientific classification
- Kingdom: Animalia
- Phylum: Arthropoda
- Class: Insecta
- Order: Lepidoptera
- Family: Crambidae
- Genus: Criophthona
- Species: C. aridalis

Binomial name
- Criophthona aridalis Hampson, 1913

Species of moth

Criophthona aridalis is a moth in the family Crambidae. It was described by George Hampson in 1913. It is found in the Democratic Republic of the Congo (Katanga) and South Africa.
