= Coremata =

Scientific classification
- Domain: Eukaryota
- Kingdom: Animalia
- Phylum: Arthropoda
- Class: Insecta
- Order: Lepidoptera
- Family: Crambidae
- Subfamily: Spilomelinae
- Genus: Coremata; Amsel, 1956
- Species: C. stigmatalis

Binomial name
- Coremata stigmatalis (Hampson, 1899)

Synonyms
- Bocchoris stigmatalis Hampson, 1899; Culcita Amsel, 1957

Genus of moths

Coremata is a monotypic moth genus of the family Crambidae described by Hans Georg Amsel in 1956. It contains only one species, Coremata stigmatalis, described by George Hampson in 1899, which is found in São Paulo, Brazil.

The wingspan is about 24 mm. The forewings are white with a slight yellowish tinge and with four black dots at the base, as well as a subbasal fuscous eight-shaped mark.
