= Criophthona ecista =

Scientific classification
- Domain: Eukaryota
- Kingdom: Animalia
- Phylum: Arthropoda
- Class: Insecta
- Order: Lepidoptera
- Family: Crambidae
- Genus: Criophthona
- Species: C. ecista

Binomial name
- Criophthona ecista (Turner, 1913)

Synonyms
- Conoprora ecista Turner, 1913

Species of moth

Criophthona ecista is a moth in the family Crambidae. It was described by Turner in 1913. It is found in Australia, where it has been recorded from the Northern Territory.

The wingspan is 10–12 mm. The forewings are whitish, irrorated with fuscous and with dark-fuscous markings. The hindwings are fuscous with indistinct or obsolete lines. Adults have been recorded on wing from October to December.
