= Sedenia mesochorda =

Scientific classification
- Domain: Eukaryota
- Kingdom: Animalia
- Phylum: Arthropoda
- Class: Insecta
- Order: Lepidoptera
- Family: Crambidae
- Genus: Sedenia
- Species: S. mesochorda

Binomial name
- Sedenia mesochorda Turner, 1917

Species of moth

Sedenia mesochorda is a moth in the family Crambidae. It is found in Australia, where it has been recorded from Victoria.

Its wingspan is about 22 millimetres (0.87 in). The wings are whitish, densely suffused with pale fuscous. There is a median whitish streak from the base to the end of the cell. The hindwings are whitish, faintly suffused with fuscous along the apical portion of the termen.
