= Prionopaltis subdentalis =

Scientific classification
- Domain: Eukaryota
- Kingdom: Animalia
- Phylum: Arthropoda
- Class: Insecta
- Order: Lepidoptera
- Family: Crambidae
- Genus: Prionopaltis
- Species: P. subdentalis

Binomial name
- Prionopaltis subdentalis C. Swinhoe, 1894

Species of moth

Prionopaltis subdentalis is a moth in the family Crambidae. It was described by Charles Swinhoe in 1894. It is found in Meghalaya, India.

The wings are uniform greyish olive, with a brown mark at the end of each cell. The forewings have a small brown spot within the cell. The exterior line starts with two white lunular marks at the costa. It is continued across the hindwings. The marginal points are black.
