= Agrammia =

Scientific classification
- Kingdom: Animalia
- Phylum: Arthropoda
- Clade: Pancrustacea
- Class: Insecta
- Order: Lepidoptera
- Family: Crambidae
- Subfamily: Spilomelinae
- Genus: Agrammia; Guenée, 1854

Genus of moths

Agrammia is a genus of moths of the family Crambidae.

== Species ==
- Agrammia iridalis Guenée, 1854
- Agrammia matronalis Guenée, 1854
