= Pylartes =

Scientific classification
- Domain: Eukaryota
- Kingdom: Animalia
- Phylum: Arthropoda
- Class: Insecta
- Order: Lepidoptera
- Family: Crambidae
- Subfamily: Spilomelinae
- Genus: Pylartes; Walker, 1863

Type species
- Pylartes subcostalis Walker, 1863

Genus of moths

Pylartes is a genus of moths of the family Crambidae. It was described by Francis Walker in 1863.

== Species ==
- Pylartes subcostalis Walker, 1863
- Pylartes totuanalis (Schaus, 1927)
