= Praeacrospila pellucidalis =

Scientific classification
- Domain: Eukaryota
- Kingdom: Animalia
- Phylum: Arthropoda
- Class: Insecta
- Order: Lepidoptera
- Family: Crambidae
- Genus: Praeacrospila
- Species: P. pellucidalis

Binomial name
- Praeacrospila pellucidalis (Dognin, 1904)

Synonyms
- Mimorista pellucidalis Dognin, 1904

Species of moth

Praeacrospila pellucidalis is a moth in the family Crambidae. It was described by Paul Dognin in 1904. It is found in Ecuador.
