= Paramecyna dimorphalis =

Scientific classification
- Kingdom: Animalia
- Phylum: Arthropoda
- Class: Insecta
- Order: Lepidoptera
- Family: Crambidae
- Subfamily: Spilomelinae
- Genus: Paramecyna; Amsel, 1961
- Species: P. dimorphalis

Binomial name
- Paramecyna dimorphalis Amsel, 1961

Genus of moths

Paramecyna is a genus of moths of the family Crambidae. It contains only one species, Paramecyna dimorphalis, which is found in Iran.
