= Trithyris =

Scientific classification
- Kingdom: Animalia
- Phylum: Arthropoda
- Clade: Pancrustacea
- Class: Insecta
- Order: Lepidoptera
- Family: Crambidae
- Subfamily: Pyraustinae
- Genus: Trithyris; Lederer, 1863

Genus of moths

Trithyris is a genus of moths of the family Crambidae.

== Species ==
- Trithyris aethiopicalis Ghesquière, 1942
- Trithyris flavifimbria Dognin, 1905
- Trithyris janualis Lederer, 1863
