= Leucochromodes =

Scientific classification
- Kingdom: Animalia
- Phylum: Arthropoda
- Class: Insecta
- Order: Lepidoptera
- Family: Crambidae
- Genus: Leucochromodes; Amsel, 1956

Genus of moths

Leucochromodes is a genus of moths of the family Crambidae.

== Species ==
- Leucochromodes analytica (Dyar, 1914)
- Leucochromodes bicoloralis (Dyar, 1910)
- Leucochromodes eupharamacis (Dyar, 1914)
- Leucochromodes euphthinylla (Dyar, 1914)
- Leucochromodes melusinalis (Walker, 1859)
- Leucochromodes peruvensis (Hampson, 1912)
- Leucochromodes saltigalis (Druce, 1895)
- Leucochromodes trinitensis (Hampson, 1912)
