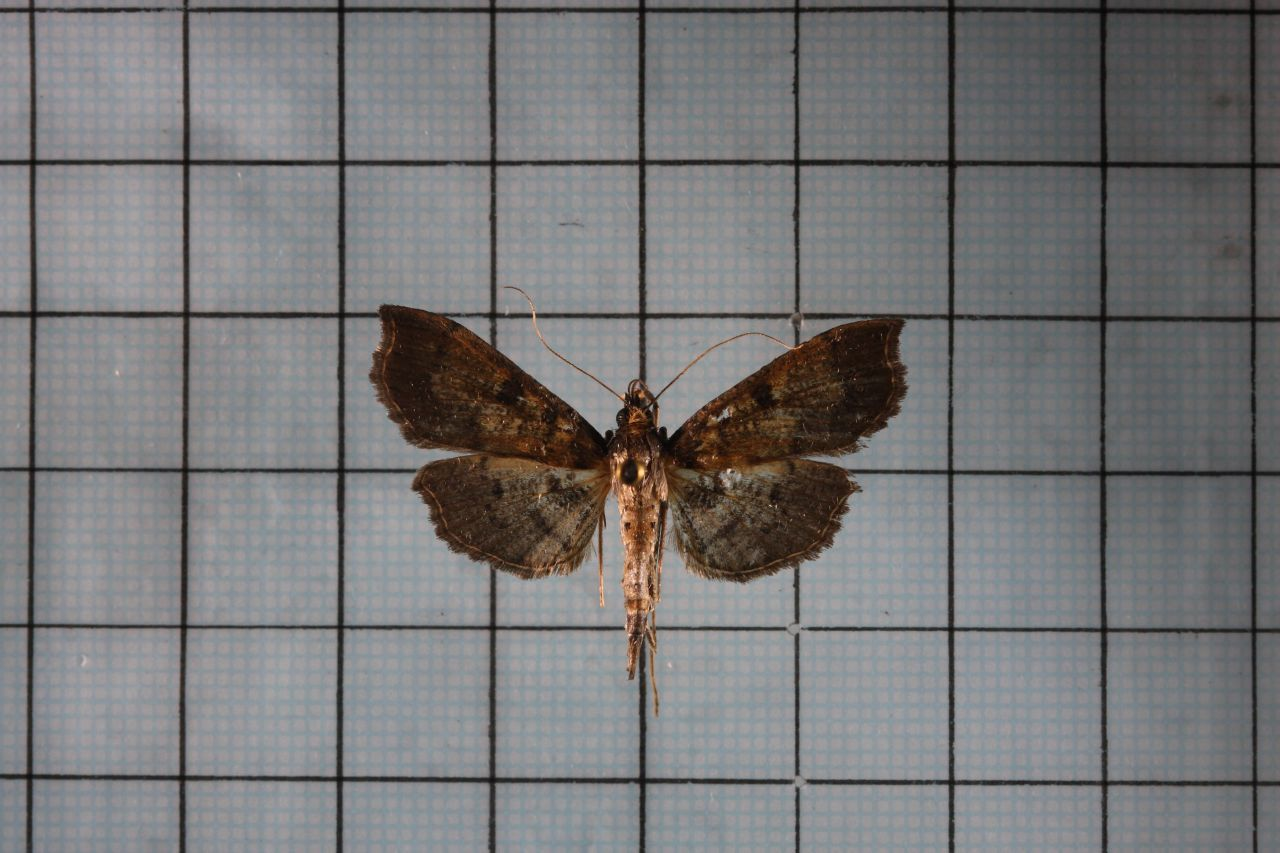
- Ceratarcha umbrosa

Scientific classification
- Kingdom: Animalia
- Phylum: Arthropoda
- Clade: Pancrustacea
- Class: Insecta
- Order: Lepidoptera
- Family: Crambidae
- Subfamily: Spilomelinae
- Genus: Ceratarcha; C. Swinhoe, 1894

= Ceratarcha =

Genus of moths

Ceratarcha is a genus of moths of the family Crambidae. The genus was erected by Charles Swinhoe in 1894. Both species are found in the Indian state of Meghalaya.

== Species ==
- Ceratarcha clathralis C. Swinhoe, 1894
- Ceratarcha umbrosa C. Swinhoe, 1894
