= Eudaimonisma =

Scientific classification
- Domain: Eukaryota
- Kingdom: Animalia
- Phylum: Arthropoda
- Class: Insecta
- Order: Lepidoptera
- Family: Crambidae
- Subfamily: Spilomelinae
- Genus: Eudaimonisma; T. P. Lucas, 1902
- Species: E. batchelorella

Binomial name
- Eudaimonisma batchelorella T. P. Lucas, 1902

Genus of moths

Eudaimonisma is a genus of moths of the family Crambidae. It contains only one species, Eudaimonisma batchelorella, which is found in Australia, where it has been recorded from Queensland, the Northern Territory and South Australia.
