= Eurybela =

Scientific classification
- Domain: Eukaryota
- Kingdom: Animalia
- Phylum: Arthropoda
- Class: Insecta
- Order: Lepidoptera
- Family: Crambidae
- Genus: Eurybela; Turner, 1908

Genus of moths

Eurybela is a genus of moths of the family Crambidae.

== Species ==
- Eurybela scotopis Turner, 1908
- Eurybela trophoessa (Turner, 1908)
