= Prionopaltis sericea =

Scientific classification
- Domain: Eukaryota
- Kingdom: Animalia
- Phylum: Arthropoda
- Class: Insecta
- Order: Lepidoptera
- Family: Crambidae
- Genus: Prionopaltis
- Species: P. sericea

Binomial name
- Prionopaltis sericea Warren, 1892

Species of moth

Prionopaltis sericea is a moth in the family Crambidae. It was described by William Warren in 1892. It is found in Himachal Pradesh, India.

The wingspan is about 24 mm. The forewings are glossy fuscous, the first line very indistinct and slightly oblique. The second line is also indistinct, bounded below the costa by a pale yellowish-white blotch. The hindwing have the second line repeated, and followed by a pale area throughout its course.
