= Eporidia =

Scientific classification
- Kingdom: Animalia
- Phylum: Arthropoda
- Class: Insecta
- Order: Lepidoptera
- Family: Crambidae
- Subfamily: Pyraustinae
- Genus: Eporidia; Walker, 1859
- Species: E. dariusalis

Binomial name
- Eporidia dariusalis Walker, 1859

Synonyms
- Eporedia Walker, 1859; Eporedia dariusalis

Genus of moths

Eporidia is a genus of moths of the family Crambidae. It contains only one species, Eporidia dariusalis, is found in Cameroon, the Republic of Congo, the Democratic Republic of Congo, Equatorial Guinea, Ghana and Togo.
