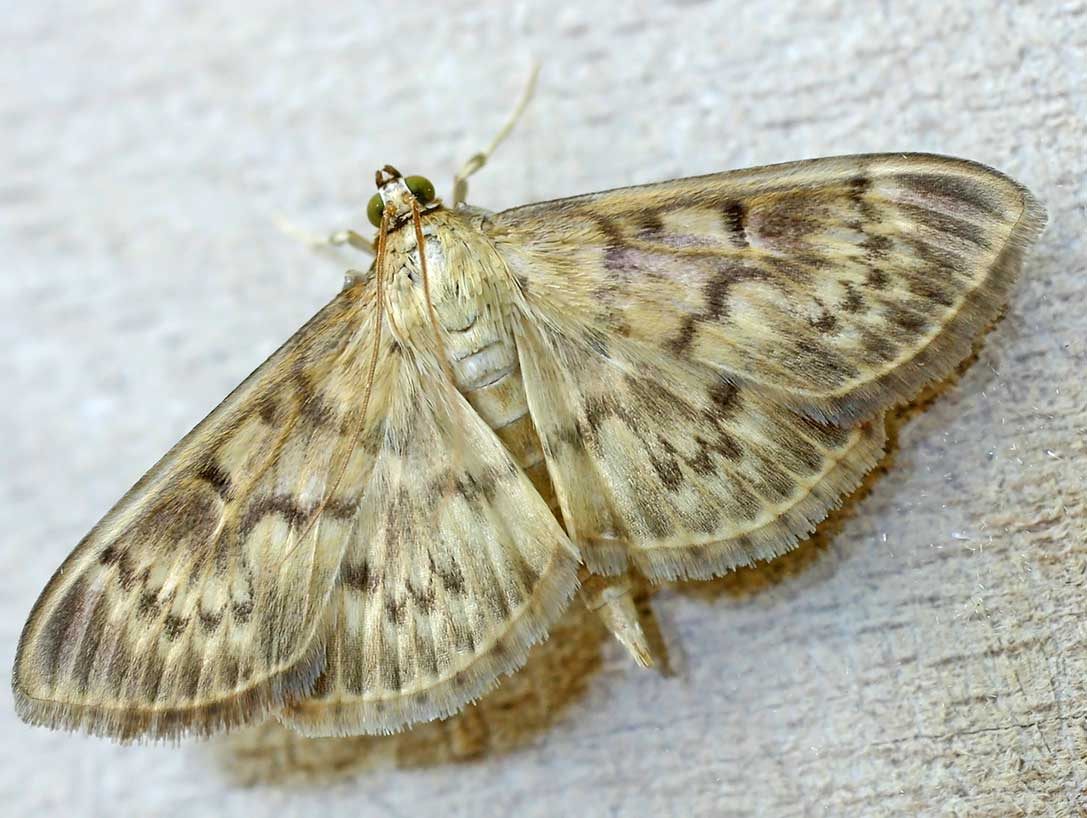
- Mother of pearl, Patania ruralis

Scientific classification
- Kingdom: Animalia
- Phylum: Arthropoda
- Clade: Pancrustacea
- Class: Insecta
- Order: Lepidoptera
- Family: Crambidae
- Subfamily: Spilomelinae; Guenée, 1854

Genera
- see text

= Spilomelinae =

Subfamily of moths

Spilomelinae is a very species-rich subfamily of the lepidopteran family Crambidae, the crambid snout moths. With 4,180 described species in 351 genera worldwide, it is the most speciose group among pyraloids.

== Description ==
Imagines – the adult life stage – vary considerably in size: the forewing span ranges from 11.5 mm e.g. in Metasia to 50 mm in the robust-bodied Eporidia. In resting position, the moths exhibit a characteristic triangular shape, with the wings usually folded over the abdomen, the forewings covering the hindwings. Some Spilomelinae diverge from this common resting pattern, like Maruca with widely spread wings, and Atomopteryx and Lineodes with narrow wings folded along the body. All Spilomelinae moths have well-developed compound eyes, antennae and mouthparts, although in the genera Niphopyralis and Siga the proboscis is lost.

Synapomorphic characters of the subfamily comprise minute or obsolete maxillary palpi, ventrally projecting fornix tympani, and the female genitalia's ductus bursae with a weak sclerotization or a granulose texture. The moths are furthermore characterized by an often bilobed praecinctorium, pointed spinula, and the absence of chaetosemata and of a retinacular hook. A gnathos or pseudognathos can be present or absent and is therefore of little diagnostic value, except for several genera of Agroterini, where the gnathos has a well-developed medial process.

== Food plants ==
Food plant use is diverse within Spilomelinae, ranging from ferns over gymnosperms to a wide spectrum of angiosperms. The larvae of Niphopyralis live in nests of weaver ants, where they feed on ant larvae. Many Steniini caterpillars are detritivores.

Many Spilomelinae tribes have a narrow food spectrum, with the larvae feeding on plants of only one or a few plant families, e.g. Lineodini on Solanaceae, Hydririni primarily on Sapindaceae and Convolvulaceae, and Trichaeini on Rubiaceae.

== Economic impact ==
A number of Spilomelinae are considered "pest species", with their larvae feeding on a variety of economically important crops. Notable representatives are the genera of Leucinodes and Neoleucinodes with larvae feeding on Solanaceae, Cnaphalocrocis and Marasmia damaging Poaceae like Oryza, Sorghum and Zea, the legume pod borers of the genus Maruca on Fabaceae and Amaranthaceae, and Spoladea, who feeds on a variety of different agriculturally important plant families.

The box tree moth, Cydalima perspectalis, whose larvae feed on box trees, a prominent ornamental plant in many parks and gardens, has been accidentally introduced to Europe in the mid-2000s and to North America in 2018.

== Systematics ==
Cladogram of Spilomelinae tribes

- Spilomelinae
  - Hydririni
  - - Lineodini
    - Udeini
  - - Wurthiini
    - euspilomeline tribes
      - Agroterini
      - - Margaroniini
        - - Spilomelini
          - - Herpetogrammatini
            - - - Hymeniini
                - Asciodini
              - - Trichaeini
                - - Steniini
                  - Nomophilini

Spilomelinae phylogeny after Mally et al. (2019)

Until the late 1990s, Spilomelinae were included in the subfamily Pyraustinae as tribe Spilomelini.

In the past, Spilomelinae were believed to be polyphyletic. However, a recent phylogenetic study by Mally et al. (2019), based on molecular genetic and morphological data, found the subfamily to be monophyletic. The study's authors furthermore proposed 13 tribes within Spilomelinae:

- Agroterini Acloque, 1897
- Asciodini Mally, Hayden, Neinhuis, Jordal & Nuss, 2019
- Herpetogrammatini Mally, Hayden, Neinhuis, Jordal & Nuss, 2019
- Hydririni Minet, 1982
- Hymeniini Swinhoe, 1900
- Lineodini Amsel, 1956
- Margaroniini Swinhoe & Cotes, 1889
- Nomophilini Kuznetzov & Stekolnikov, 1979
- Spilomelini Guenée, 1854
- Steniini Guenée, 1854
- Trichaeini Mally, Hayden, Neinhuis, Jordal & Nuss, 2019
- Udeini Mally, Hayden, Neinhuis, Jordal & Nuss, 2019
- Wurthiini Roepke, 1916

=== "Non-euspilomeline" tribes ===
Hydririni, Lineodini, Udeini and Wurthiini share several plesiomorphic characters with the sister group of Spilomelinae, the Pyraustinae. These plesiomorphies are: absence of longitudinal strips on the male abdominal segment 8; male genitalia with a straight to concave valva costa and a phallus with an evenly sclerotized apodeme; female genitalia with a lanceolate "ediacaroid" signum in the corpus bursae and in several taxa with an appendix bursae attached to the corpus bursae.

Due to these plesiomorphies, these four Spilomelinae tribes are referred to as "non-euspilomeline" tribes as opposed to the monophyletic "euspilomeline" group that represents a more derived group of Spilomelinae. The "non-euspilomeline" tribes form a paraphylum as they do not comprise the "euspilomelines".

=== "Euspilomeline" tribes ===
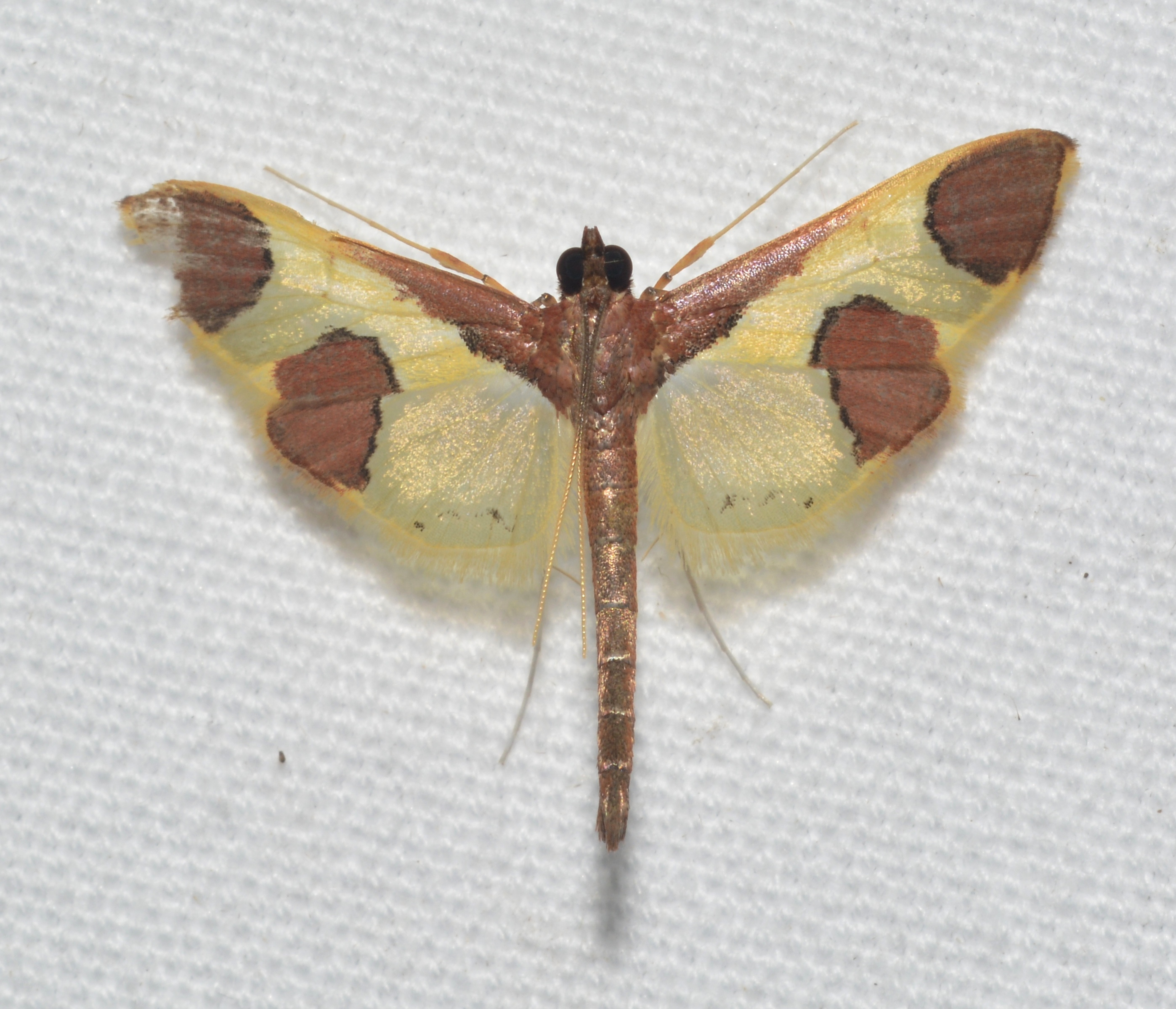
Syllepis hortalis (Hydririni), adult

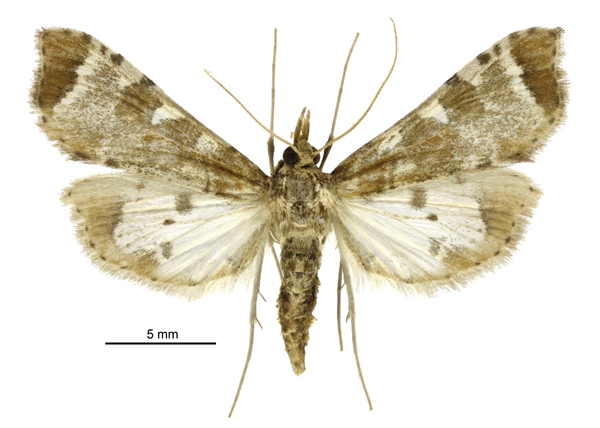
Leucinodes cordalis (Lineodini), adult female

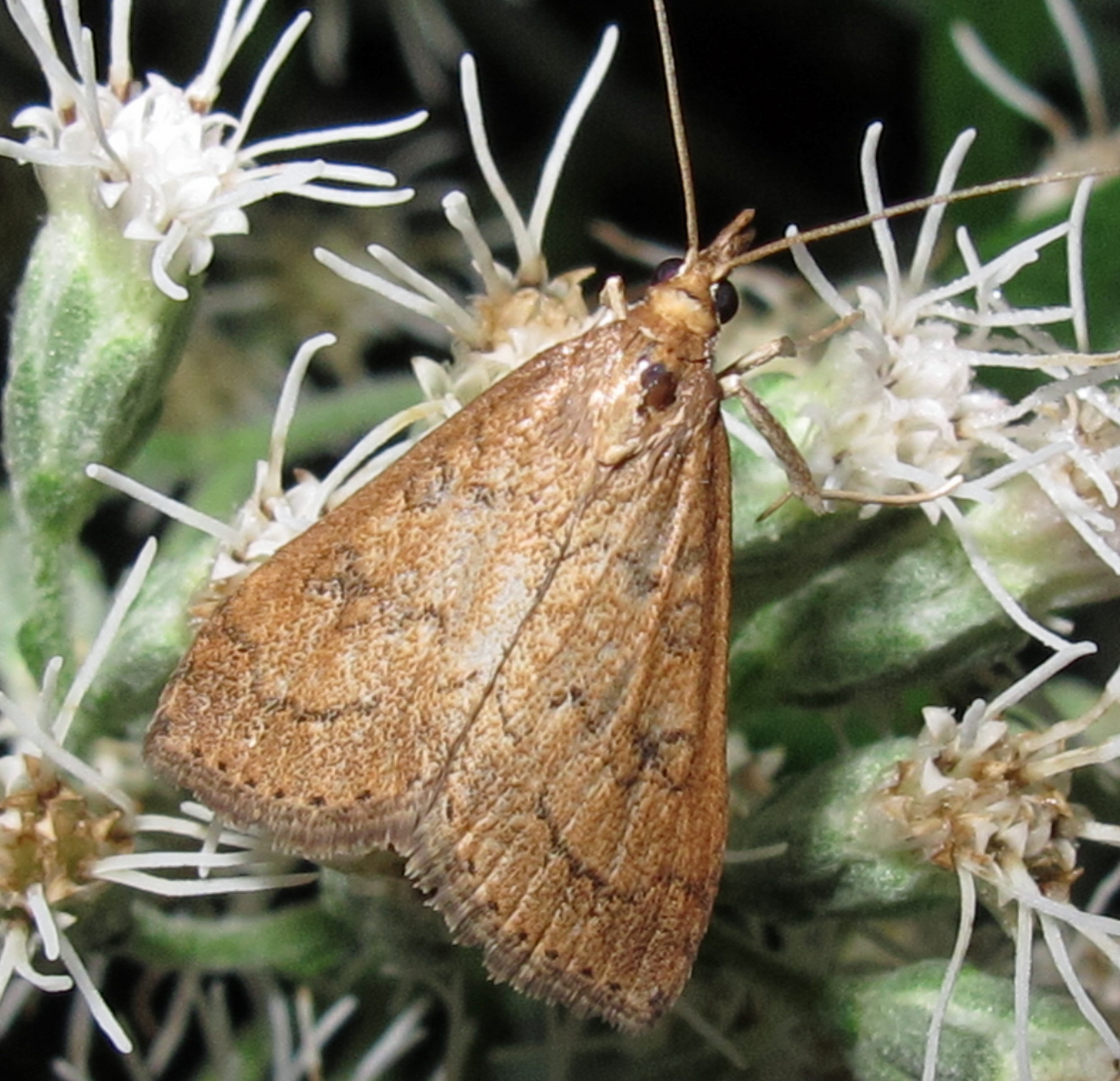
Udea rubigalis (Udeini), adult

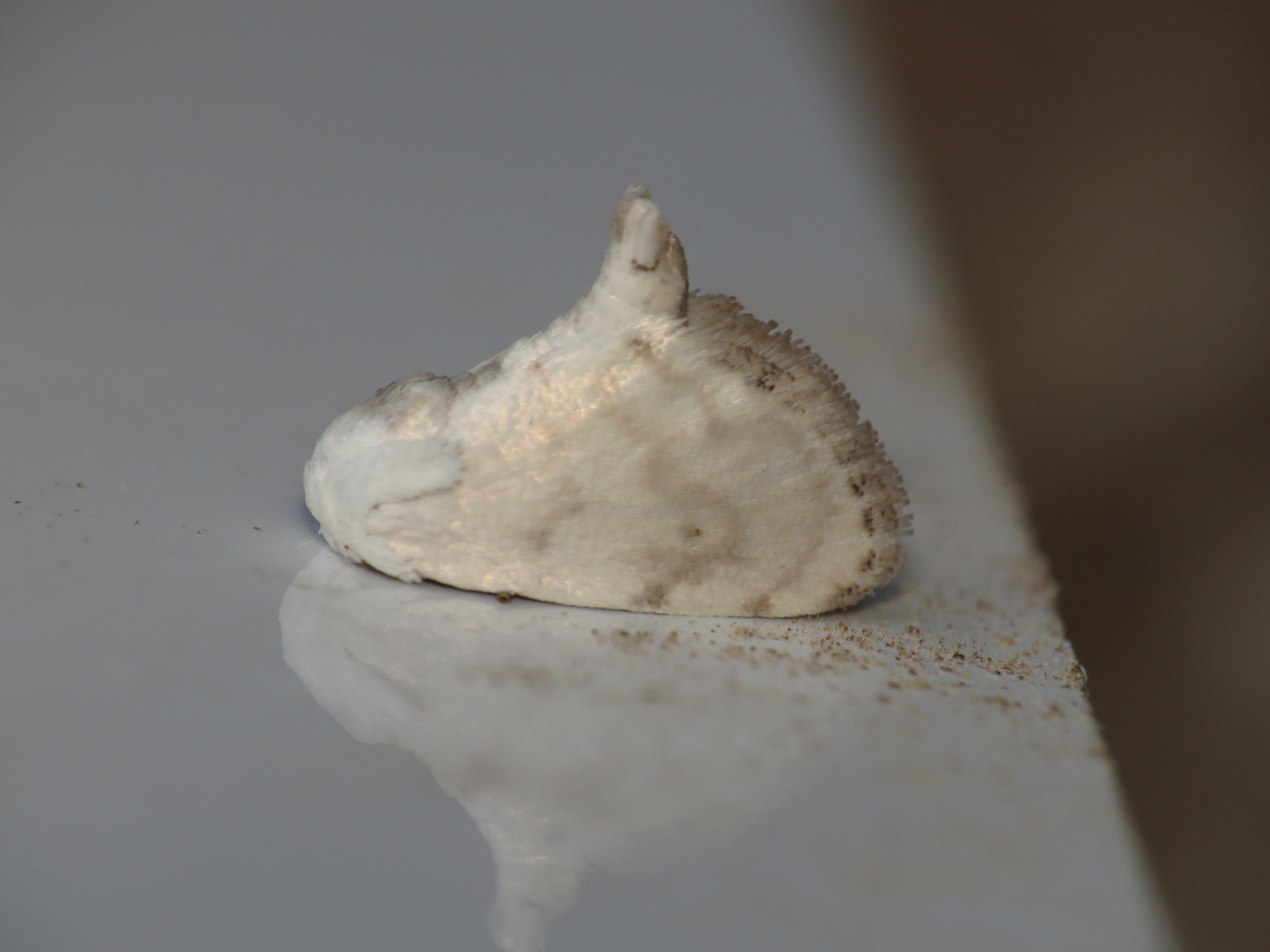
Niphopyralis chionesis (Wurthiini), adult

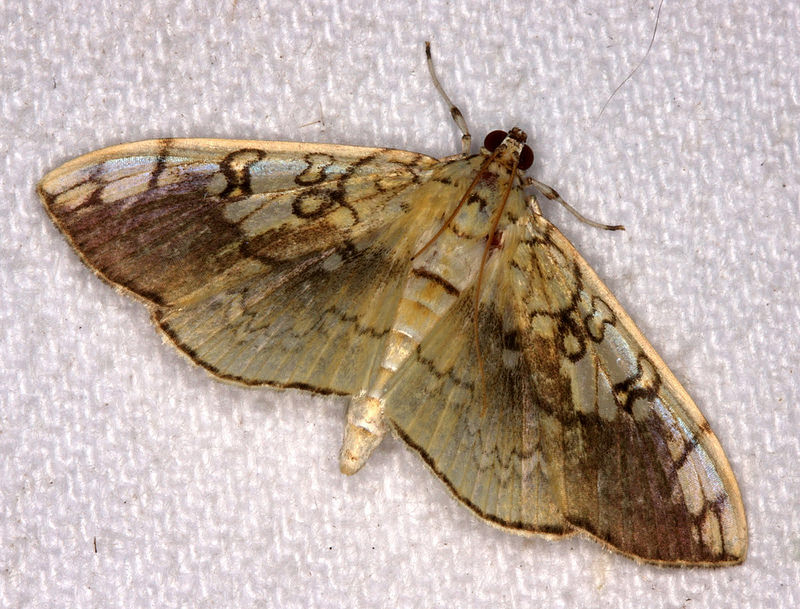
Pantographa limata (Agroterini), adult, from the US state of Missouri

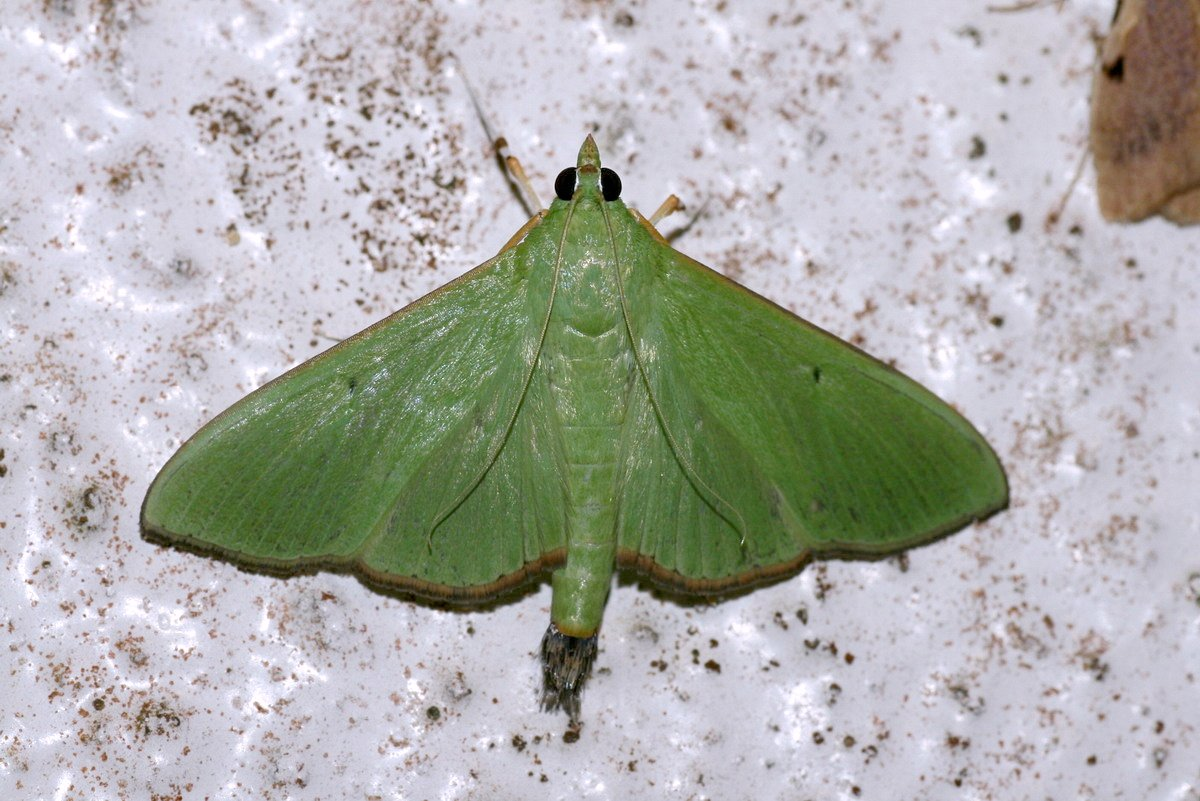
Unidentified species of Parotis (Margaroniini), adult

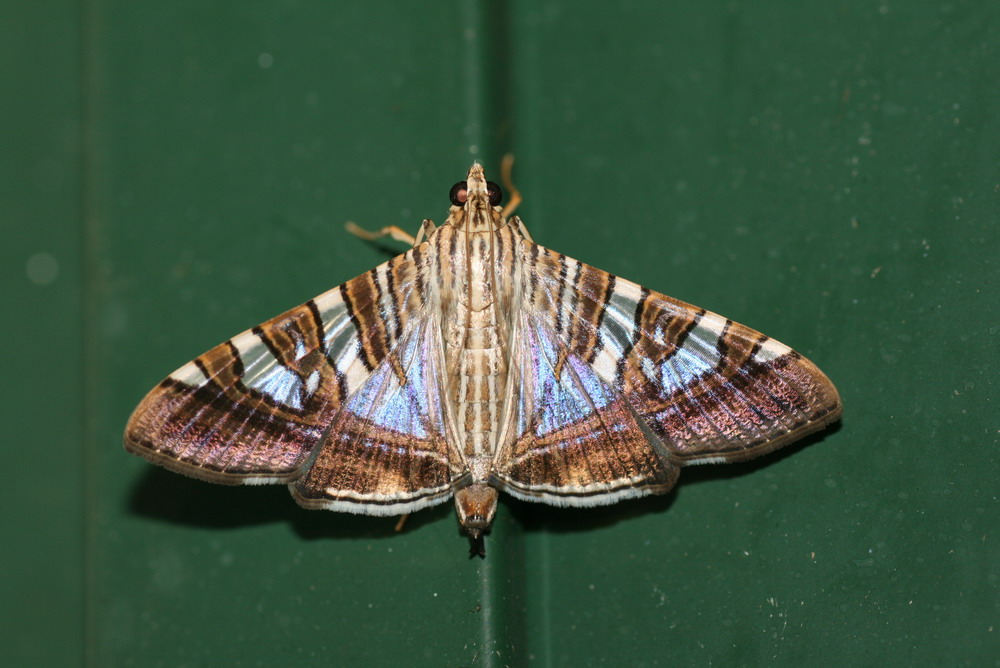
Glyphodes stolalis (Margaroniini), adult

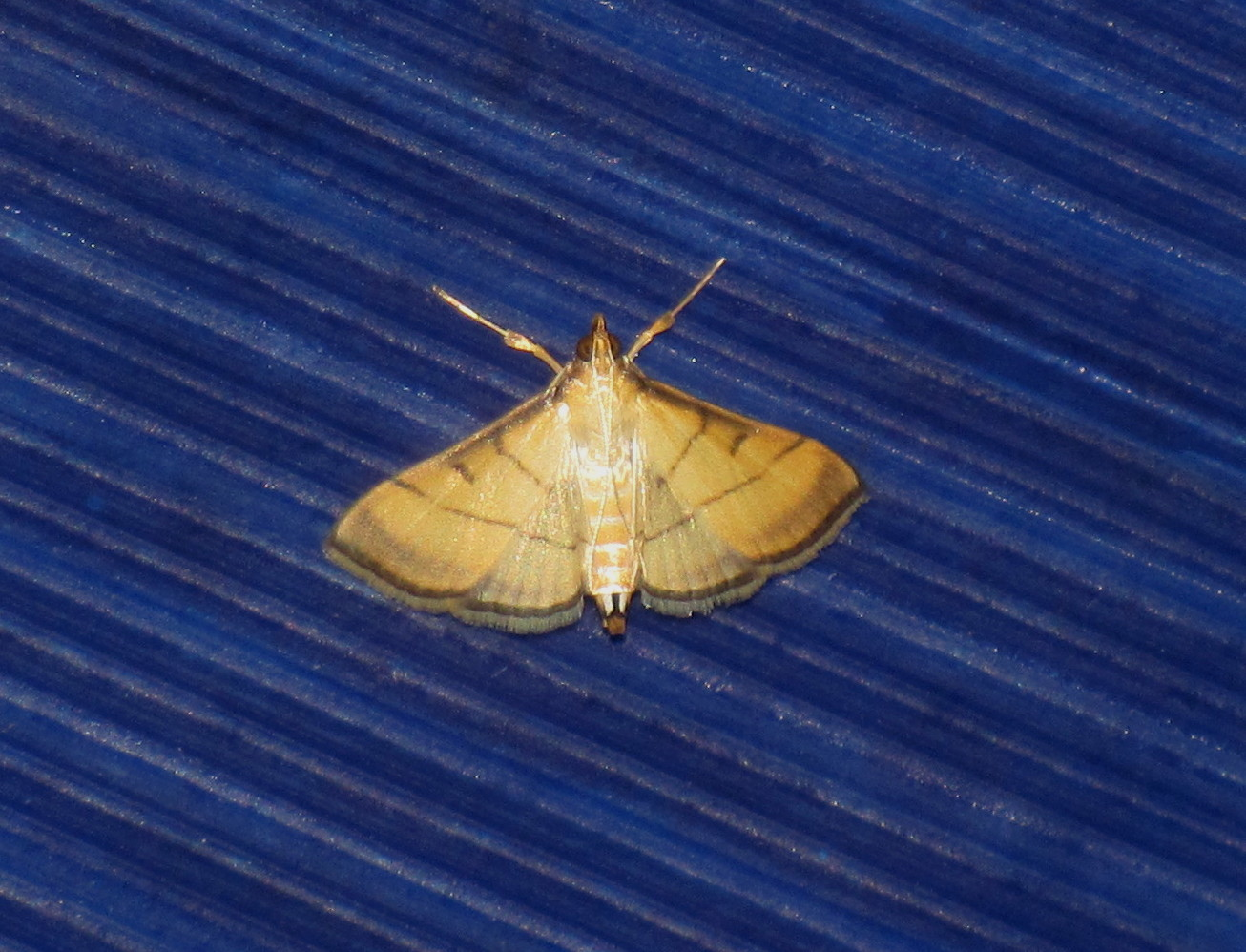
Cnaphalocrocis medinalis (Spilomelini), adult

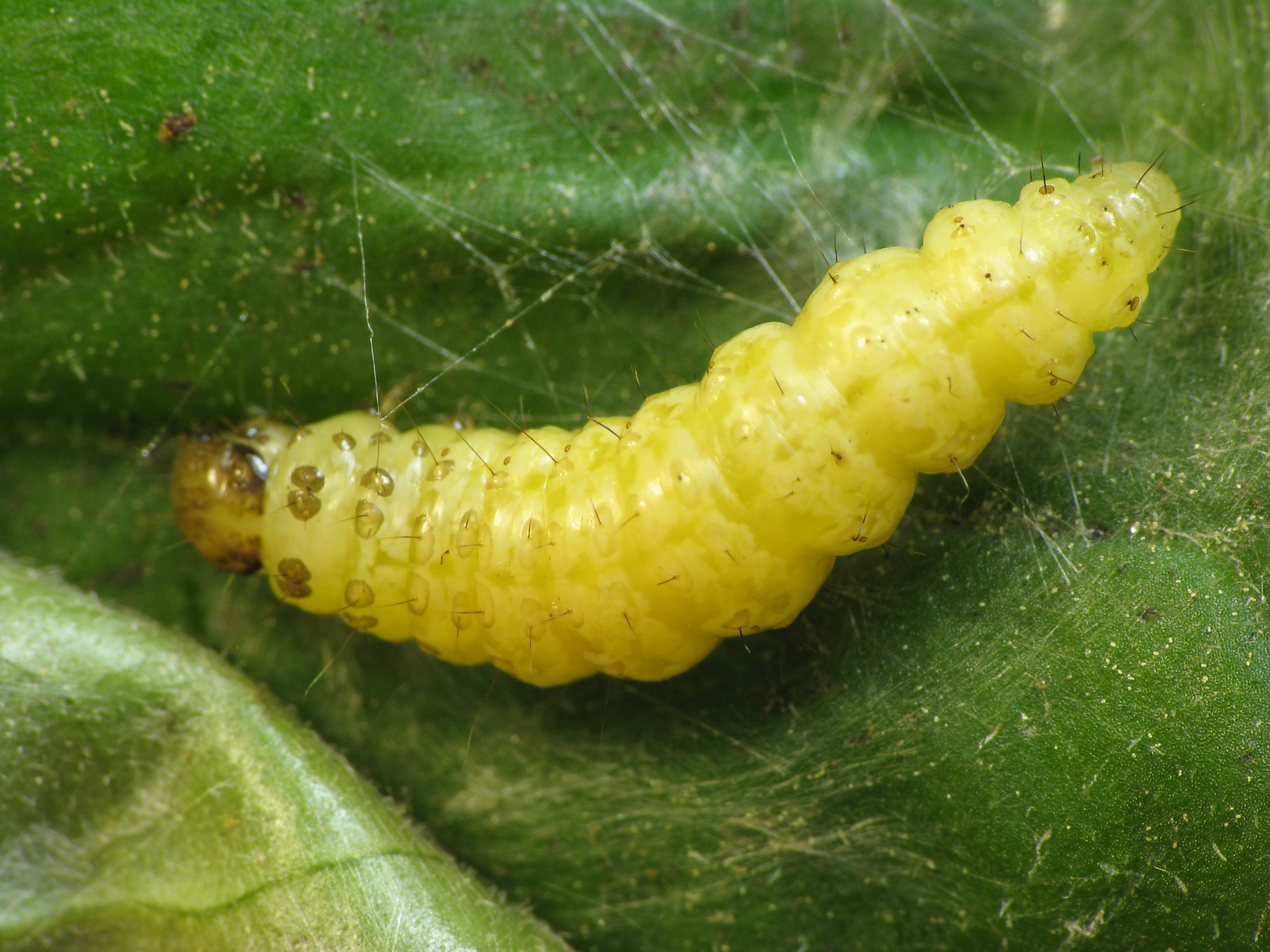
Herpetogramma aeglealis (Herpetogrammatini), larva, last instar

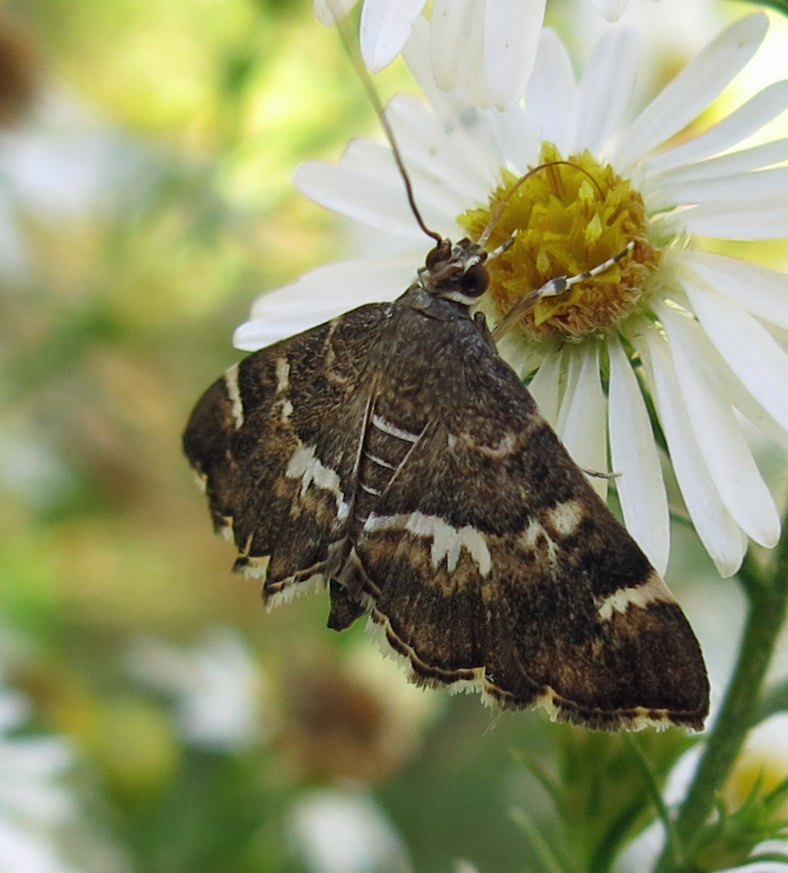
Hymenia perspectalis (Hymeniini), adult

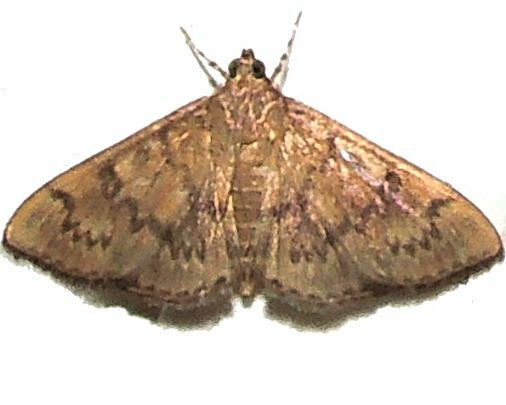
Psara obscuralis (Asciodini), adult

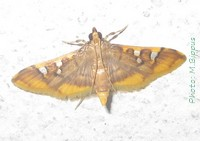
Prophantis smaragdina (Trichaeini), adult

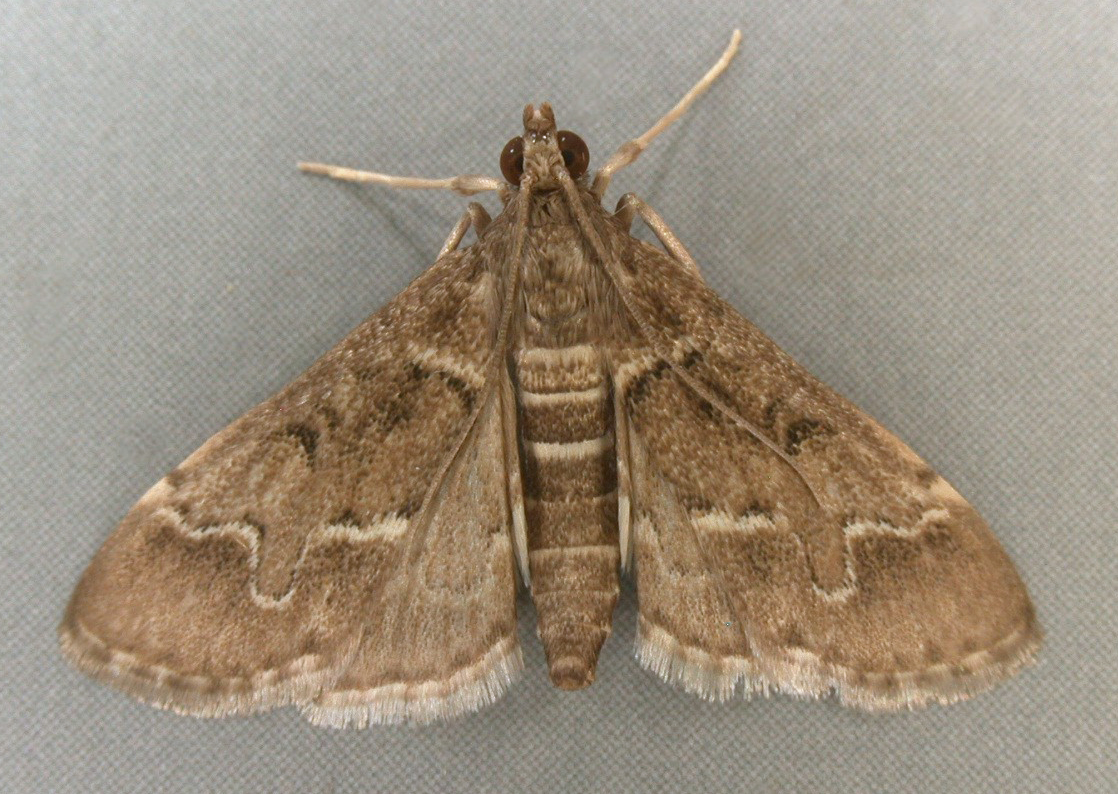
Duponchelia fovealis (Steniini), adult

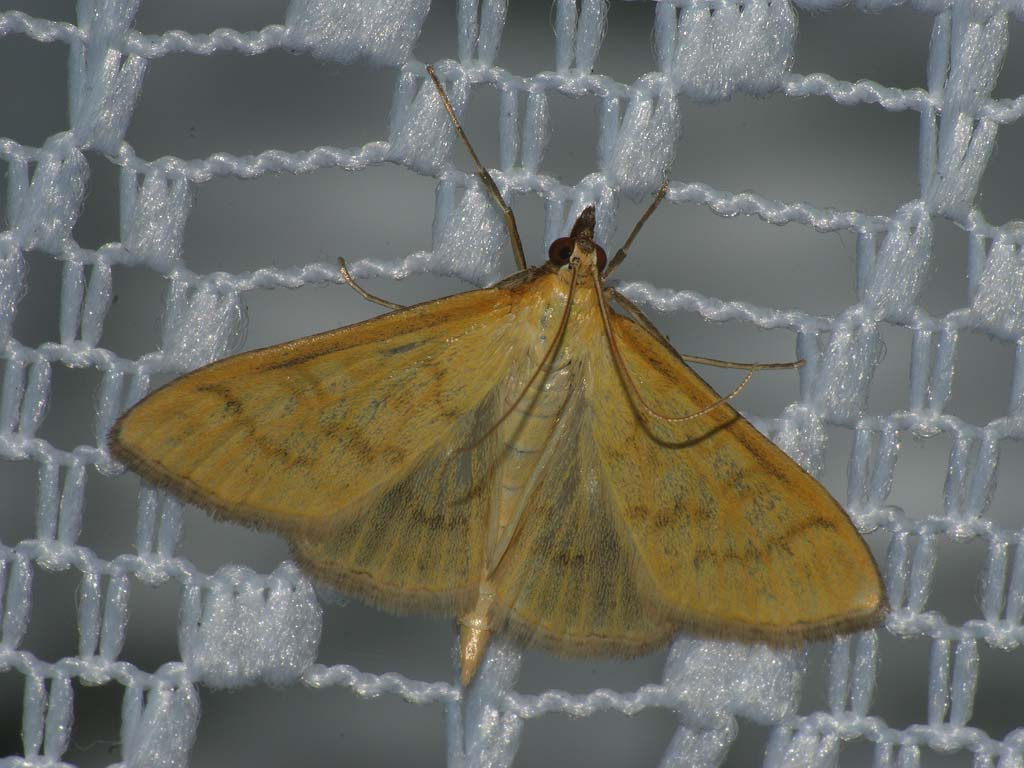
Mecyna flavalis (Nomophilini), adult

The tribes Agroterini, Margaroniini, Spilomelini, Herpetogrammatini, Hymeniini, Asciodini, Trichaeini, Steniini and Nomophilini form the monophylum of "euspilomelines" (Greek eu- for "good" or "true"), all sharing a common ancestor. The synapomorphies of euspilomelines are: male abdominal tergite 8 with an emarginate anterior edge; male genitalia with partly sclerotized hair pencils on the anterior edge of vinculum-tegumen connection, with a convex valva costa, and the phallus without a coecum and the sclerotization of the phallus apodeme reduced to a ventral, longitudinally sclerotized strip along the manica; female genitalia with a longitudinal membranous strip in the antrum, and the lack of a strongly sclerotised colliculum between antrum and ductus seminalis.

=== Genera currently unplaced in any Spilomelinae tribe ===
Based on the morphological synapomorphies and characteristics of these tribes, Mally et al. (2019) assigned numerous Spilomelinae genera to these proposed tribes, so that about two thirds of the 339 Spilomelinae genera are placed in these tribes, leaving 132 genera currently unplaced:

- Aboetheta Turner, 1914
- Acicys Turner, 1911
- Aediodina Strand, 1919
- Agrammia Guenée, 1854
- Almonia Walker, 1866
- Ametrea Munroe, 1964
- Archernis Meyrick, 1886 (= Chrysommatodes Warren, 1896, Metoportha Meyrick, 1894, Protonoceras Warren, 1890)
- Arxama Walker, 1866
- Atelocentra Meyrick, 1884
- Auchmophoba Turner, 1913
- Bacotoma Moore, 1885 (= Epactoctena Meyrick, 1937, Platamonia Lederer, 1863, Platamonina J. C. Shaffer & Munroe, 2007)
- Cangetta Moore, 1886
- Carthade Snellen, 1899
- Chabula Moore, 1886
- Chromodes Guenée, 1854
- Cissachroa Turner, 1937
- Coelorhyncidia Hampson, 1896
- Coptobasis Lederer, 1863
- Coremata Amsel, 1956
- Cotachena Moore, 1885
- Criophthona Meyrick, 1884
- Camptomastix Warren, 1892 (= Camptomastyx Hampson, 1896)
- Cangetta Moore, 1886 (= Blechrophanes Turner, 1937)
- Carthade Snellen, 1899 (= Chartade Neave, 1939)
- Cavifrons Zeller, 1872
- Ceratarcha Swinhoe, 1894
- Chabula Moore, 1886
- Chromodes Guenée, 1854
- Cissachroa Turner, 1937
- Coelorhyncidia Hampson, 1896
- Coptobasis Lederer, 1863
- Coremata Amsel, 1956 (= Culcita Amsel, 1957)
- Cotachena Moore, 1885 (= Mesothyris Warren, 1892, Syndicastis Meyrick, 1889)
- Criophthona Meyrick, 1884 (= Conoprora Turner, 1913)
- Daulia Walker, 1859 (= Girtexta Swinhoe, 1890)
- Deuterarcha Meyrick, 1884
- Deuterophysa Warren, 1889
- Dichocrocis Lederer, 1863 (= Zebrodes Warren, 1896)
- Discothyris Warren, 1895
- Dracaenura Meyrick, 1886
- Duzulla Amsel, 1952
- Ebuleodes Warren, 1896
- Ectadiosoma Turner, 1937
- Elbursia Amsel, 1950
- Eudaimonisma T. P. Lucas, 1902
- Eulepte Hübner, 1825 (= Acrospila Lederer, 1863)
- Eurybela Turner, 1908
- Eustenia Snellen, 1899
- Furcivena Hampson, 1896
- Gadessa Moore, 1885
- Gethosyne Warren, 1896
- Glauconoe Warren, 1892
- Goniorhynchus Hampson, 1896
- Heterudea Dognin, 1905
- Hyalea Guenée, 1854
- Indogrammodes Kirti & Rose, 1989
- Ischnurges Lederer, 1863 (= Nesolocha Meyrick, 1886)
- Legrandellus J. C. Shaffer & Munroe, 2007
- Lepidoneura Hampson, 1896
- Leucinodella Strand, 1918
- Leucochromodes Amsel, 1956
- Leucophotis Butler, 1886
- Lipararchis Meyrick, 1934
- Luma Walker, 1863 (= Pelena Moore, 1886, Pelina Hampson, 1897, Petena Neave, 1940)
- Macaretaera Meyrick, 1886 (= Trichoptychodes Swinhoe, 1894, Trigonophylla Turner, 1937)
- Macrobela Turner, 1939
- Malaciotis Meyrick, 1934
- Malickyella Mey & Speidel, 2010
- Meekiaria Munroe, 1974
- Merodictya Warren, 1896
- Mesocondyla Lederer, 1863
- Metallarcha Meyrick, 1884 (= Panopsia Turner, 1913)
- Metoeca Warren, 1896
- Metraeopsis Dognin, 1905
- Microgeshna J. C. Shaffer & Munroe, 2007
- Microphysetica Hampson, 1917 (= Falx Amsel, 1956, Falcimorpha Amsel, 1957)
- Mimudea Warren, 1892
- Mukia Amsel, 1954
- Myriostephes Meyrick, 1884
- Myrmidonistis Meyrick, 1887
- Nacoleia Walker, 1859 (= Aplomastix Warren, 1890, Orthocona Warren, 1896, Semioceros Meyrick, 1884)
- Nankogobinda Rose & Kirti, 1986
- Nausinoe Hübner, 1825 (= Lepyrodes Guenée, 1854, Phalangiodes Guenée, 1854)
- Nausinoella J. C. Shaffer & Munroe, 2007
- Neostege Hampson, 1910
- Nevrina Guenée, 1854
- Nistra Walker, 1859
- Notesia Yamanaka, 1992
- Ommatobotys J. C. Shaffer & Munroe, 2007
- Orphnophanes Lederer, 1863 (= Syntomodora Meyrick, 1894)
- Orthospila Warren, 1890
- Osiriaca Walker, 1866 (= Myriotis Meyrick, 1885)
- Otiophora Turner, 1908
- Paramecyna Amsel, 1961
- Pectinobotys Munroe, 1959
- Pelinopsis Dognin, 1905
- Physematia Lederer, 1863
- Piletocera Lederer, 1863 (= Alutefa Swinhoe, 1900, Danaga Moore, 1885, Diplotyla Meyrick, 1886, Ellogima Turner, 1913, Erebangela Meyrick, 1886, Graphicopoda Butler, 1886, Hormatholepis Butler, 1886, Ptilaeola Meyrick, 1886, Rinecera Butler, 1884, Sematosopha Meyrick, 1937, Strepsimela Meyrick, 1886)
- Plateopsis Warren, 1896
- Platygraphis Dyar, 1918
- Pleonectoides Hampson, 1891
- Polythlipta Lederer, 1863
- Praeacrospila Amsel, 1956
- Praephostria Amsel, 1956
- Pramadea Moore, 1888
- Preneopogon Warren, 1896
- Prionopaltis Warren, 1892
- Prorodes Swinhoe, 1894 (= Idiostrophe Warren, 1896)
- Proternia Meyrick, 1884
- Protonoceras Warren, 1890
- Pycnarmon Lederer, 1863 (= Aripana Moore, 1886, Entephria Lederer, 1863, Eutrichotis Swinhoe, 1900, Pyralocymatophora Strand, 1918, Satanastra Meyrick, 1890)
- Pylartes Walker, 1863
- Pyradena Munroe, 1958
- Ravanoa Moore, 1885
- Rehimena Walker, 1866
- Rhimphaliodes Hampson, 1893 (= Rhimphaleodes Hampson, 1896)
- Rhynchetria Klunder van Gijen, 1913
- Sagariphora Meyrick, 1894
- Sameodesma Hampson, 1918
- Sedenia Guenée, 1854
- Sericophylla Turner, 1937 (= Sericophora Turner, 1937)
- Stenorista Dognin, 1905
- Syngropia Hampson, 1912
- Syntrita Dognin, 1905
- Tabidia Snellen, 1880
- Tanaophysopsis Munroe, 1964
- Tasenia Snellen, 1901
- Torqueola Swinhoe, 1906
- Trichoceraea Sauber in G. Semper, 1902
- Trigonobela Turner, 1915
- Trithyris Lederer, 1863
- Troctoceras Dognin, 1905
- Tylostega Meyrick, 1894
- Voliba Walker, 1866 (= Gabrisa Walker, 1866, Stereocopa Meyrick, 1885)
- Xanthomelaena Hampson, 1896
- Zagiridia Hampson, 1897

=== Genera excluded from Spilomelinae ===
Aporocosmus Butler, 1886 was transferred to Odontiinae, Orthoraphis Hampson, 1896 to Lathrotelinae, Hydropionea Hampson, 1917 and Plantegumia Amsel, 1956 to Glaphyriinae, and Prooedema Hampson, 1896 to Pyraustinae.

== See also ==
- List of crambid genera
