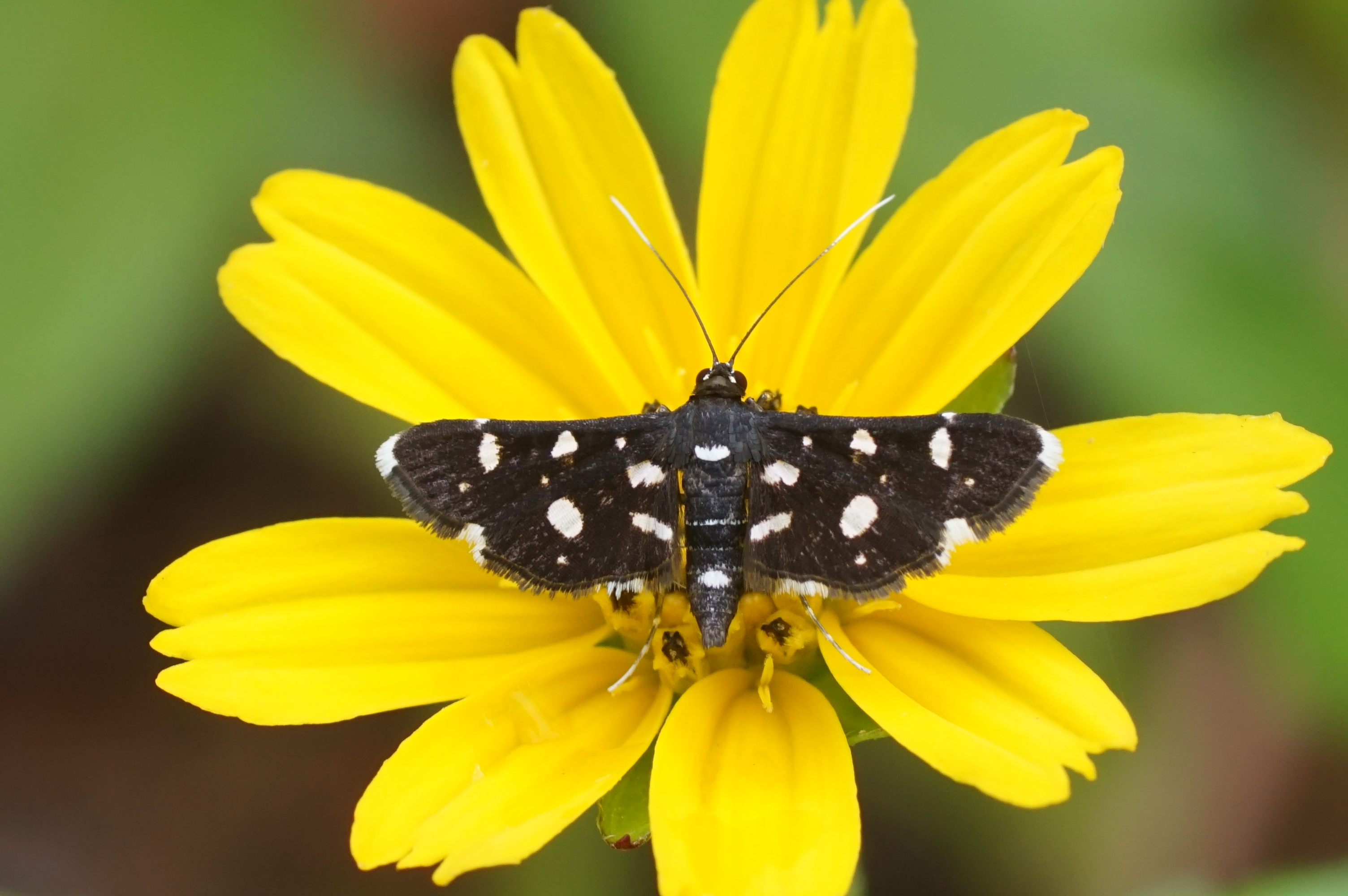
- Bocchoris inspersalis

Scientific classification
- Kingdom: Animalia
- Phylum: Arthropoda
- Class: Insecta
- Order: Lepidoptera
- Family: Crambidae
- Subfamily: Spilomelinae
- Genus: Bocchoris; Moore, 1885

= Bocchoris (moth) =

Genus of moths

Bocchoris is a genus of moths of the family Crambidae described by Frederic Moore in 1885.

== Species ==
- Bocchoris adalis Walker, 1859
- Bocchoris albinalis Hampson, 1912
- Bocchoris albipunctalis Shibuya, 1929
- Bocchoris amandalis C. Swinhoe, 1903 (Thailand)
- Bocchoris aptalis (Walker, [1866]) (Japan and Indonesia)
- Bocchoris borbonensis Guillermet in Viette & Guillermet, 1996 (Reunion)
- Bocchoris chalcidiscalis Hampson, 1898 (Brazil)
- Bocchoris darsanalis (Druce, 1895)
- Bocchoris gallienalis (Viette, 1958) (from Madagascar)
- Bocchoris graphitalis (Snellen, 1875)
- Bocchoris incoalis Schaus, 1920
- Bocchoris inductalis (Walker, 1865)
- Bocchoris inspersalis (Zeller, 1852)
- Bocchoris insulalis Hampson, 1912
- Bocchoris isakalis Viette, 1954 (Madagascar)
- Bocchoris junctifascialis Hampson, 1898 (from Indonesia)
- Bocchoris labarinthalis Hampson, 1912 (from Congo and Nigeria)
- Bocchoris lumaralis Holland, 1900 (from Indonesia)
- Bocchoris manuselalis Rothschild, 1915 (from Indonesia)
- Bocchoris marucalis (Druce, 1895) (from Costa Rica)
- Bocchoris nuclealis de Joannis, 1927 (Mozambique)
- Bocchoris placitalis Schaus, 1912 (from Costa Rica)
- Bocchoris pulverealis Hampson, 1898 (Java)
- Bocchoris rufiflavalis Hampson, 1912 (from Madagascar)
- Bocchoris telphusalis (Walker, 1859) (from Borneo and India)
- Bocchoris tenera Butler, 1883 (from southern Asia)
- Bocchoris trimaculalis (Snellen, 1880)
- Bocchoris triumphalis (C. Felder, R. Felder & Rogenhofer, 1875)
- Bocchoris trivitralis C. Swinhoe, 1895 (from India)

== Former species ==
- Bocchoris acamalis (Walker)
- Bocchoris amphipeda (Meyrick, 1939)
- Bocchoris approprialis Dyar, 1914
- Bocchoris artificalis (Lederer, 1863)
- Bocchoris danalis Hampson, 1893
- Bocchoris densalis Dyar, 1914
- Bocchoris differentialis Dyar, 1914
- Bocchoris edaphodrepta Dyar, 1914
- Bocchoris gueyraudi (Guillermet, 2003)
- Bocchoris hohaelis Dyar, 1914
- Bocchoris incisalis Snellen, 1880
- Bocchoris insipidalis (Lederer, 1863)
- Bocchoris invidiosa Dyar, 1914
- Bocchoris nacobora Dyar, 1914
- Bocchoris onychinalis (Guenée, 1854)
- Bocchoris rhehabalis Dyar, 1914
- Bocchoris rotundalis Hampson, 1893
- Bocchoris sparsalis Dyar, 1914
- Bocchoris terealis Walker, 1859
