= Hileithia ductalis =

Scientific classification
- Kingdom: Animalia
- Phylum: Arthropoda
- Class: Insecta
- Order: Lepidoptera
- Family: Crambidae
- Genus: Hileithia
- Species: H. ductalis

Binomial name
- Hileithia ductalis Möschler, 1890

Species of moth

Hileithia ductalis is a species of moth in the family Crambidae. It was described by Heinrich Benno Möschler in 1890. It is found in Puerto Rico and Cuba.

The larvae feed on Blechum pyramidatum.
