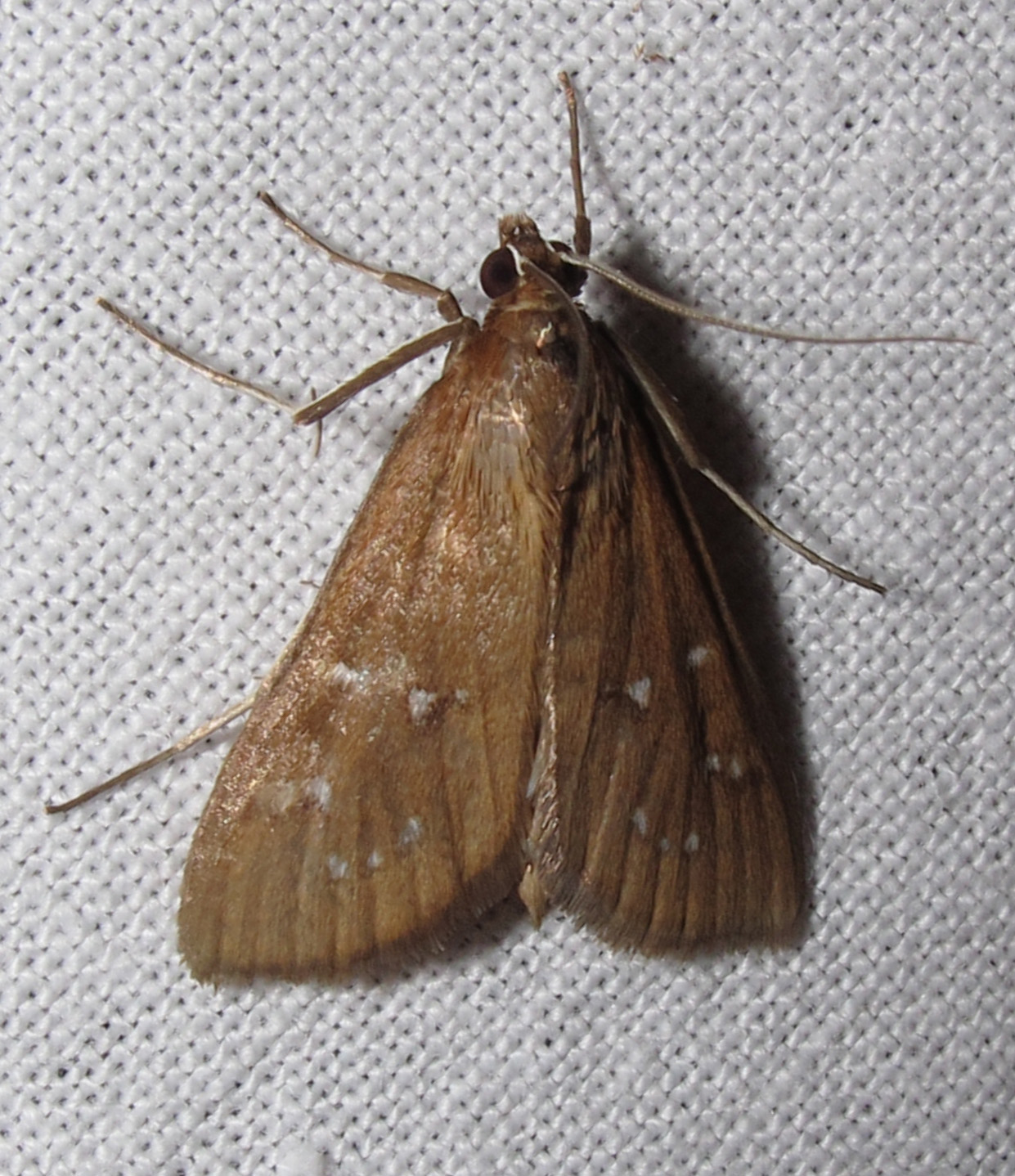
- Diastictis ventralis

Scientific classification
- Kingdom: Animalia
- Phylum: Arthropoda
- Class: Insecta
- Order: Lepidoptera
- Family: Crambidae
- Tribe: Agroterini
- Genus: Diastictis; Hübner, 1818

Synonyms
- Anomostictis Warren, 1892; Diastichtis Forbes, 1923

= Diastictis =

Genus of moths

Diastictis is a genus of moths of the family Crambidae.

== Species ==
- Diastictis albovittalis Munroe, 1956
- Diastictis argyralis Hübner, 1818
- Diastictis caecalis (Warren, 1892)
- Diastictis fracturalis (Zeller, 1872)
- Diastictis holguinalis Munroe, 1956
- Diastictis incisalis Snellen, 1880
- Diastictis pseudargyralis Munroe, 1956
- Diastictis robustior Munroe, 1956
- Diastictis sperryorum Munroe, 1956
- Diastictis ventralis (Grote & Robinson, 1867)
- Diastictis viridescens Munroe, 1956

=== Former species ===
- Diastictis tenera (Butler, 1883) - transferred to Chabulina tenera (Butler, 1883)
- Diastictis andersoni (Swett, 1916) - transferred to Speranza occiduaria (Packard, 1874)
