= Nausinoe reussi =

Scientific classification
- Domain: Eukaryota
- Kingdom: Animalia
- Phylum: Arthropoda
- Class: Insecta
- Order: Lepidoptera
- Family: Crambidae
- Genus: Nausinoe
- Species: N. reussi

Binomial name
- Nausinoe reussi (Gaede, 1917)

Synonyms
- Lepyrodes reussi Gaede, 1917

Species of moth

Nausinoe reussi is a species of moth of the family Crambidae described by Max Gaede in 1917. It can be found in Tanzania, in eastern Africa.

This species remembers a little Nausinoe geometralis. It has pale-brown wings with white spots and has a wingspan of 18–20 mm. The holotypes were found in Kilwa in German East Africa (today: Tanzania), Dar es Salaam, and Ukerewe Island.
