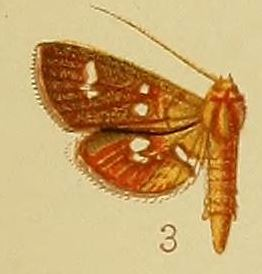
- Nausinoe argyrosticta

Scientific classification
- Domain: Eukaryota
- Kingdom: Animalia
- Phylum: Arthropoda
- Class: Insecta
- Order: Lepidoptera
- Family: Crambidae
- Subfamily: Spilomelinae
- Genus: Nausinoe; Hübner, 1825

Synonyms
- Lepyrodes Guenée, 1854; Phalangiodes Guenée, 1854

= Nausinoe =

Genus of moths

Nausinoe (named after the Greek mythology character Nausinous) is a genus of moths of the family Crambidae. It was first described by Jacob Hübner in 1825.

== Species ==
- Nausinoe argyrosticta (Hampson, 1910)
- Nausinoe capensis (Walker, 1866)
- Nausinoe conchylia Meyrick, 1894
- Nausinoe ejectata (Fabricius, 1775)
- Nausinoe geometralis (Guenée, 1854)
- Nausinoe globulipedalis (Walker, 1866)
- Nausinoe gueyraudi Guillermet, 2004
- Nausinoe lacustrinalis (Hampson, 1913)
- Nausinoe perspectata (Fabricius, 1775)
- Nausinoe piabilis (Wallengren, 1876)
- Nausinoe pueritia (Cramer, 1780)
- Nausinoe quadrinalis (Guenée, 1854)
- Nausinoe reussi (Gaede, 1917)
- Nausinoe velialis (Gaede, 1917)

== Former species ==
- Nausinoe aphrospila Meyrick, 1936
