= Nausinoe quadrinalis =

Scientific classification
- Kingdom: Animalia
- Phylum: Arthropoda
- Class: Insecta
- Order: Lepidoptera
- Family: Crambidae
- Genus: Nausinoe
- Species: N. quadrinalis

Binomial name
- Nausinoe quadrinalis (Guenée, 1854)

Synonyms
- Lepyrodes quadrinalis Guenée, 1854

Species of moth

Nausinoe quadrinalis is a moth in the family Crambidae. It was described by Achille Guenée in 1854. It is found in South Africa and Zimbabwe.
