= Bocchoris lumaralis =

Scientific classification
- Kingdom: Animalia
- Phylum: Arthropoda
- Clade: Pancrustacea
- Class: Insecta
- Order: Lepidoptera
- Family: Crambidae
- Genus: Bocchoris
- Species: B. lumaralis

Binomial name
- Bocchoris lumaralis Holland, 1900

Species of moth

Bocchoris lumaralis is a moth in the family Crambidae. It was described by William Jacob Holland in 1900. It is found on Buru in Indonesia.

The wingspan is about 24 mm. The wings are white with a lustrous violet reflection. There are two small spots on the costa of the forewings, as well as a narrow submarginal transverse brown band. There are two dark brown spots at the base of the hindwings and a large dark brown spot at the end of the cell.
