= Diastictis holguinalis =

Scientific classification
- Kingdom: Animalia
- Phylum: Arthropoda
- Class: Insecta
- Order: Lepidoptera
- Family: Crambidae
- Genus: Diastictis
- Species: D. holguinalis

Binomial name
- Diastictis holguinalis Munroe, 1956

Species of moth

Diastictis holguinalis is a moth in the family Crambidae. It was described by Eugene G. Munroe in 1956. It is found in Cuba and Florida.
