= Nausinoe conchylia =

Scientific classification
- Kingdom: Animalia
- Phylum: Arthropoda
- Class: Insecta
- Order: Lepidoptera
- Family: Crambidae
- Genus: Nausinoe
- Species: N. conchylia

Binomial name
- Nausinoe conchylia Meyrick, 1894

Species of moth

Nausinoe conchylia is a moth in the family Crambidae. It was described by Edward Meyrick in 1894. It is found on Borneo.
