= Bocchoris aptalis =

Scientific classification
- Kingdom: Animalia
- Phylum: Arthropoda
- Clade: Pancrustacea
- Class: Insecta
- Order: Lepidoptera
- Family: Crambidae
- Genus: Bocchoris
- Species: B. aptalis

Binomial name
- Bocchoris aptalis (Walker, 1866)

Synonyms
- Botys aptalis Walker, 1866; Samea usitata Butler, 1879

Species of moth

Bocchoris aptalis is a moth in the family Crambidae. It was described by Francis Walker in 1866. It is found on the Moluccas and in Japan.
