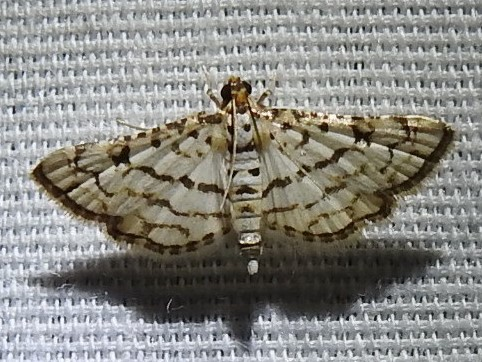

Scientific classification
- Kingdom: Animalia
- Phylum: Arthropoda
- Clade: Pancrustacea
- Class: Insecta
- Order: Lepidoptera
- Family: Crambidae
- Genus: Hileithia
- Species: H. aplicalis

Binomial name
- Hileithia aplicalis (Guenée, 1854)

Synonyms
- Isopteryx aplicalis Guenée, 1854; Blepharomastix aplicalis; Isopteryx xeniolalis Hulst, 1886

= Hileithia aplicalis =

Species of moth

Hileithia aplicalis is a species of moth in the family Crambidae. It was described by Achille Guenée in 1854. It is found in the United States, where it has been recorded from Georgia, Arizona, Florida and Texas.

The wingspan is about 11 mm. Adults have been recorded on wing from February to August.
