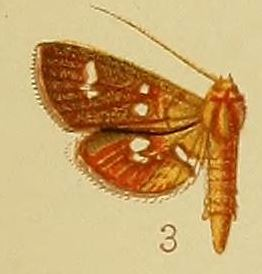

Scientific classification
- Kingdom: Animalia
- Phylum: Arthropoda
- Class: Insecta
- Order: Lepidoptera
- Family: Crambidae
- Genus: Nausinoe
- Species: N. argyrosticta

Binomial name
- Nausinoe argyrosticta (Hampson, 1910)

Synonyms
- Lepyrodes argyrosticta Hampson, 1910

= Nausinoe argyrosticta =

Species of moth

Nausinoe argyrosticta is a moth in the family Crambidae. It was described by George Hampson in 1910. It is found in Burundi, the Democratic Republic of the Congo (Katanga), Tanzania and Zambia.
