= Nausinoe pueritia =

Scientific classification
- Domain: Eukaryota
- Kingdom: Animalia
- Phylum: Arthropoda
- Class: Insecta
- Order: Lepidoptera
- Family: Crambidae
- Genus: Nausinoe
- Species: N. pueritia

Binomial name
- Nausinoe pueritia (Cramer, 1780)

Synonyms
- Phalaena pueritia Cramer, 1780

Species of moth

Nausinoe pueritia is a moth in the family Crambidae. It was described by Pieter Cramer in 1780. It is found in India, Sri Lanka, Burma, Malaysia, Thailand and Australia, where it has been recorded from the Northern Territory, Queensland and New South Wales.
