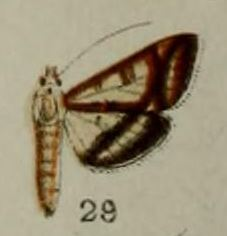

Scientific classification
- Kingdom: Animalia
- Phylum: Arthropoda
- Clade: Pancrustacea
- Class: Insecta
- Order: Lepidoptera
- Family: Crambidae
- Genus: Bocchoris
- Species: B. junctifascialis

Binomial name
- Bocchoris junctifascialis Hampson, 1898

= Bocchoris junctifascialis =

Species of moth

Bocchoris junctifascialis is a moth in the family Crambidae. It was described by George Hampson in 1898. It is found on the Banda Islands in Indonesia.

The wingspan is about 24 mm. The forewings are white with black brown costal and inner areas.
