= Bocchoris tenera =

Scientific classification
- Kingdom: Animalia
- Phylum: Arthropoda
- Clade: Pancrustacea
- Class: Insecta
- Order: Lepidoptera
- Family: Crambidae
- Genus: Bocchoris
- Species: B. tenera

Binomial name
- Bocchoris tenera Butler, 1883

Species of moth

Bocchoris tenera is a moth of the family Crambidae. It is found from South Asia.
