= Bocchoris graphitalis =

Scientific classification
- Kingdom: Animalia
- Phylum: Arthropoda
- Clade: Pancrustacea
- Class: Insecta
- Order: Lepidoptera
- Family: Crambidae
- Genus: Bocchoris
- Species: B. graphitalis

Binomial name
- Bocchoris graphitalis (Snellen, 1875)

Synonyms
- Botys graphitalis Snellen, 1875

Species of moth

Bocchoris graphitalis is a moth in the family Crambidae. It was described by Snellen in 1875. It is found in Colombia.
