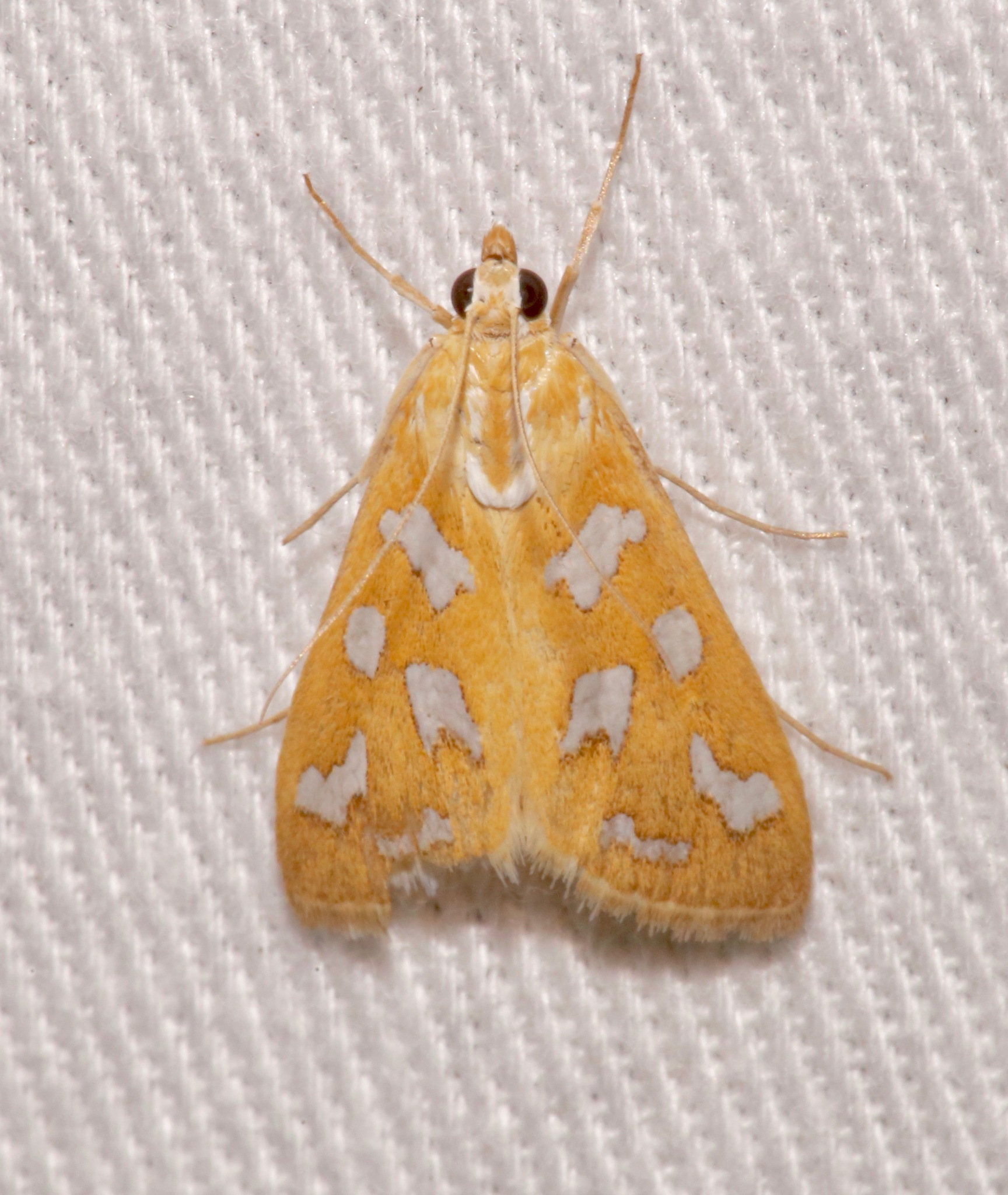

Scientific classification
- Kingdom: Animalia
- Phylum: Arthropoda
- Class: Insecta
- Order: Lepidoptera
- Family: Crambidae
- Genus: Diastictis
- Species: D. sperryorum

Binomial name
- Diastictis sperryorum Eugene Munroe, 1956

= Diastictis sperryorum =

Species of moth

Diastictis sperryorum is a species of moth in the family Crambidae. It was described by the Canadian entomologist Eugene Munroe in 1956.

The wingspan is 22–25 mm. Adults are on wing from February to August.

== Description ==
Diastictis sperryorum has brown wings with white dots spread all over them.

== Distribution and habitat ==
Diastictis sperryorum is found in North America. It is present mainly in California, although it has been recorded in New Mexico, Arizona Oklahoma and Texas.
