= Nausinoe lacustrinalis =

Scientific classification
- Kingdom: Animalia
- Phylum: Arthropoda
- Class: Insecta
- Order: Lepidoptera
- Family: Crambidae
- Genus: Nausinoe
- Species: N. lacustrinalis

Binomial name
- Nausinoe lacustrinalis (Hampson, 1913)

Synonyms
- Lepyrodes lacustrinalis Hampson, 1913

Species of moth

Nausinoe lacustrinalis is a moth in the family Crambidae. It was described by George Hampson in 1913. It is found on the Solomon Islands.
