= Bocchoris amandalis =

Scientific classification
- Kingdom: Animalia
- Phylum: Arthropoda
- Clade: Pancrustacea
- Class: Insecta
- Order: Lepidoptera
- Family: Crambidae
- Genus: Bocchoris
- Species: B. amandalis

Binomial name
- Bocchoris amandalis C. Swinhoe, 1903

Species of moth

Bocchoris amandalis is a moth in the family Crambidae. It was described by Charles Swinhoe in 1903. It is found in Thailand.

The costa of the forewings is purple brown and the outer third of both the forewings and hindwings is also purple brown. The interior of both wings is yellow, the forewings with yellow spots ringed with purple brown. The hindwings have a purple-brown medial transverse line and four yellow spots on the interior border of the marginal band.
