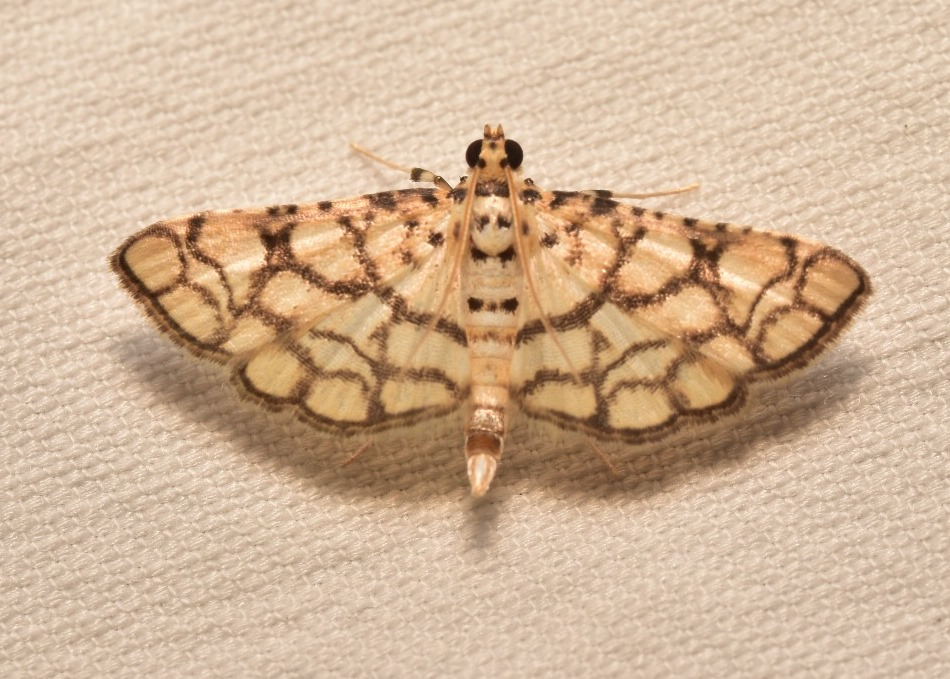

Scientific classification
- Kingdom: Animalia
- Phylum: Arthropoda
- Class: Insecta
- Order: Lepidoptera
- Family: Crambidae
- Genus: Hileithia
- Species: H. rehamalis

Binomial name
- Hileithia rehamalis (Dyar, 1914)

Synonyms
- Bocchoris rehamalis Dyar, 1914

= Hileithia rehamalis =

Species of moth

Hileithia rehamalis is a species of moth in the family Crambidae. It was described by Harrison Gray Dyar Jr. in 1914. It is found in Mexican city of Tehuacan, and the US states of Alabama, Arizona, Kentucky, New Mexico and Texas.

The wingspan is about 15 mm. Adults have been recorded on wing from May to August.
