= Hileithia costipunctalis =

Scientific classification
- Kingdom: Animalia
- Phylum: Arthropoda
- Class: Insecta
- Order: Lepidoptera
- Family: Crambidae
- Genus: Hileithia
- Species: H. costipunctalis

Binomial name
- Hileithia costipunctalis Amsel, 1956

Species of moth

Hileithia costipunctalis is a species of moth in the family Crambidae. It was described by Hans Georg Amsel in 1956. It is found in Venezuela.
