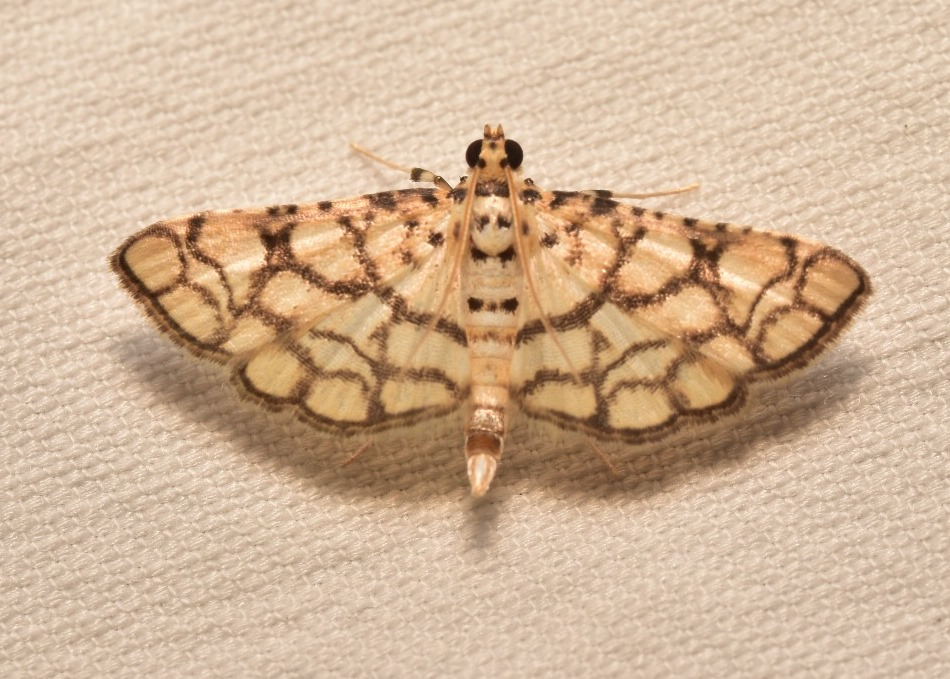

Scientific classification
- Kingdom: Animalia
- Phylum: Arthropoda
- Class: Insecta
- Order: Lepidoptera
- Family: Crambidae
- Tribe: Herpetogrammatini
- Genus: Hileithia; Snellen, 1875

Type species
- Hileithia appialis Snellen, 1875

= Hileithia =

Genus of moths

Hileithia is a genus of moths of the family Crambidae.

== Species ==
- Hileithia aplicalis (Guenée, 1854)
- Hileithia approprialis (Dyar, 1914)
- Hileithia apygalis (Guenée, 1854)
- Hileithia costipunctalis Amsel, 1956 (from Venezuela)
- Hileithia decostalis (Guenée, 1854)
- Hileithia densalis (Dyar, 1914)
- Hileithia differentialis (Dyar, 1914)
- Hileithia ductalis Möschler, 1890 (from Cuba)
- Hileithia edaphodrepta (Dyar, 1914)
- Hileithia hohaelis (Dyar, 1914)
- Hileithia invidiosa (Dyar, 1914)
- Hileithia magualis (Guenée, 1854)
- Hileithia nacobora (Dyar, 1914)
- Hileithia obliqualis (Schaus, 1912)
- Hileithia rehamalis (Dyar, 1914)
- Hileithia rhealis (Druce, 1895)
- Hileithia rhehabalis (Dyar, 1914)
- Hileithia sparsalis (Dyar, 1914)
- Hileithia terminalis (Hampson, 1912)
