= Bocchoris trimaculalis =

Scientific classification
- Kingdom: Animalia
- Phylum: Arthropoda
- Clade: Pancrustacea
- Class: Insecta
- Order: Lepidoptera
- Family: Crambidae
- Genus: Bocchoris
- Species: B. trimaculalis

Binomial name
- Bocchoris trimaculalis (Snellen, 1880)

Synonyms
- Aediodes trimaculalis Snellen, 1880

Species of moth

Bocchoris trimaculalis is a moth in the family Crambidae. It was described by Snellen in 1880. It is found on India, Burma, and Sulawesi.
