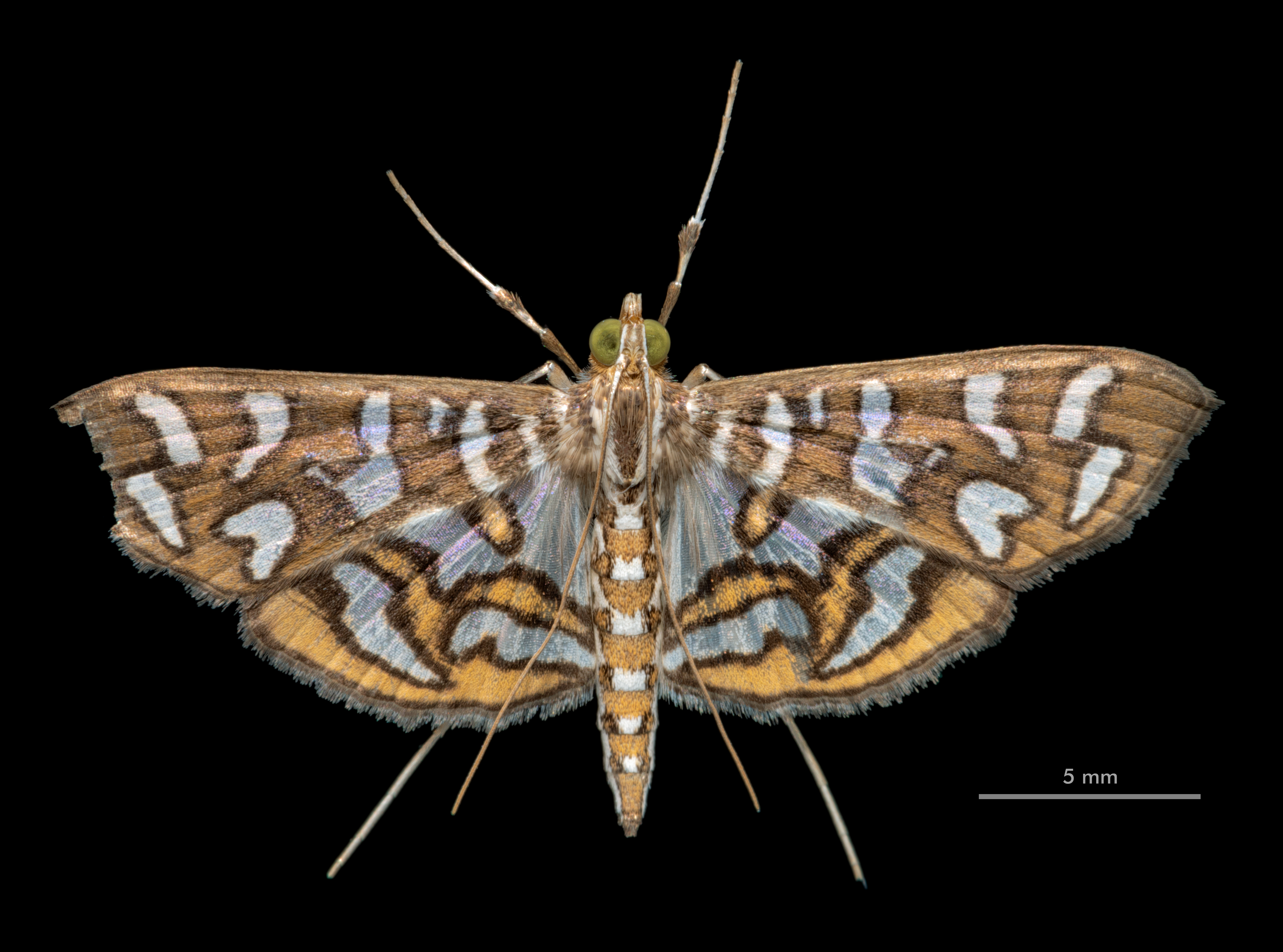

Scientific classification
- Domain: Eukaryota
- Kingdom: Animalia
- Phylum: Arthropoda
- Class: Insecta
- Order: Lepidoptera
- Family: Crambidae
- Genus: Nausinoe
- Species: N. perspectata

Binomial name
- Nausinoe perspectata (Fabricius, 1775)

Synonyms
- Phalaena perspectata Fabricius, 1775; Phalaena neptis Cramer, 1779; Phalangiodes neptisalis Guenée, 1854

= Nausinoe perspectata =

Species of moth

Nausinoe perspectata is a moth in the family Crambidae. It was described by Johan Christian Fabricius in 1775. It is found in the Democratic Republic of the Congo, China, India, New Guinea, Sri Lanka, Taiwan and Australia.

The larvae feed on Jasminum sambac and Clematis leschenaultiana.
