= Bocchoris isakalis =

Scientific classification
- Kingdom: Animalia
- Phylum: Arthropoda
- Clade: Pancrustacea
- Class: Insecta
- Order: Lepidoptera
- Family: Crambidae
- Genus: Bocchoris
- Species: B. isakalis

Binomial name
- Bocchoris isakalis Viette, 1954

Species of moth

Bocchoris isakalis is a moth in the family Crambidae. It was described by Viette in 1954. It is found in Madagascar.

It has a wingspan of 18mm.
