= Hileithia apygalis =

Scientific classification
- Kingdom: Animalia
- Phylum: Arthropoda
- Class: Insecta
- Order: Lepidoptera
- Family: Crambidae
- Genus: Hileithia
- Species: H. apygalis

Binomial name
- Hileithia apygalis (Guenée, 1854)

Synonyms
- Isopteryx apygalis Guenée, 1854; Pterygisus appialis Snellen, 1875

Species of moth

Hileithia apygalis is a species of moth in the family Crambidae. It was described by Achille Guenée in 1854. It is found in Colombia, Panama and Tabasco, Mexico.

== Description ==
The forewings and hindwings are dusky white, the former crossed from the costal to the inner margin by five fine-waved blackish-brown lines, the costal margin spotted with black, the outer margin from the apex to the anal angle broadly bordered with dark grey. The marginal line is black. The hindwings are crossed by three dark waved lines, the apex is dark grey.
