= Hileithia terminalis =

Scientific classification
- Kingdom: Animalia
- Phylum: Arthropoda
- Class: Insecta
- Order: Lepidoptera
- Family: Crambidae
- Genus: Hileithia
- Species: H. terminalis

Binomial name
- Hileithia terminalis (Hampson, 1912)

Synonyms
- Nacoleia terminalis Hampson, 1912

Species of moth

Hileithia terminalis is a species of moth in the family Crambidae. It was described by George Hampson in 1912. It is found in Jamaica.
