= Bocchoris incoalis =

Scientific classification
- Kingdom: Animalia
- Phylum: Arthropoda
- Clade: Pancrustacea
- Class: Insecta
- Order: Lepidoptera
- Family: Crambidae
- Genus: Bocchoris
- Species: B. incoalis

Binomial name
- Bocchoris incoalis Schaus, 1920

Species of moth

Bocchoris incoalis is a moth in the family Crambidae. It was described by Schaus in 1920. It is found in Peru.
