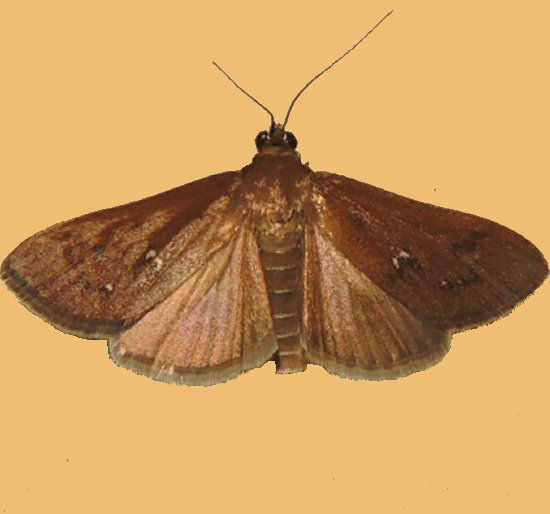

Scientific classification
- Kingdom: Animalia
- Phylum: Arthropoda
- Clade: Pancrustacea
- Class: Insecta
- Order: Lepidoptera
- Family: Crambidae
- Genus: Diastictis
- Species: D. ventralis

Binomial name
- Diastictis ventralis (Grote and Robinson, 1867)

Synonyms
- Botys ventralis Grote and Robinson, 1867

= Diastictis ventralis =

Species of moth

Diastictis ventralis, the white-spotted brown moth, is a species of moth in the family Crambidae. It is found in eastern North America.

The wingspan is about 22 mm. Adults have been recorded feeding on flower nectar of Centaurea jacea.

== Subspecies ==
- Diastictis ventralis ventralis (eastern North America)
- Diastictis ventralis seamansi Munroe, 1956 (California)
