= Bocchoris triumphalis =

Scientific classification
- Kingdom: Animalia
- Phylum: Arthropoda
- Clade: Pancrustacea
- Class: Insecta
- Order: Lepidoptera
- Family: Crambidae
- Genus: Bocchoris
- Species: B. triumphalis

Binomial name
- Bocchoris triumphalis (C. Felder, R. Felder & Rogenhofer, 1875)

Synonyms
- Botys triumphalis C. Felder, R. Felder & Rogenhofer, 1875

Species of moth

Bocchoris triumphalis is a moth in the family Crambidae. It was described by Cajetan Felder, Rudolf Felder and Alois Friedrich Rogenhofer in 1875. It is found in Colombia.
