= Bocchoris albipunctalis =

Scientific classification
- Kingdom: Animalia
- Phylum: Arthropoda
- Clade: Pancrustacea
- Class: Insecta
- Order: Lepidoptera
- Family: Crambidae
- Genus: Bocchoris
- Species: B. albipunctalis

Binomial name
- Bocchoris albipunctalis Shibuya, 1929

Species of moth

Bocchoris albipunctalis is a moth in the family Crambidae. It was described by Shibuya in 1929. It is found in Japan, where it has been recorded from the Bonin Islands.
