= Diastictis pseudargyralis =

Scientific classification
- Kingdom: Animalia
- Phylum: Arthropoda
- Class: Insecta
- Order: Lepidoptera
- Family: Crambidae
- Genus: Diastictis
- Species: D. pseudargyralis

Binomial name
- Diastictis pseudargyralis Munroe, 1956

Species of moth

Diastictis pseudargyralis is a moth in the family Crambidae. It was described by Eugene G. Munroe in 1956. It is found in North America, where it has been recorded from Florida, South Carolina and West Virginia.

The wingspan is about 21 mm. Adults are on wing from March to October.
