= Bocchoris inductalis =

Scientific classification
- Kingdom: Animalia
- Phylum: Arthropoda
- Clade: Pancrustacea
- Class: Insecta
- Order: Lepidoptera
- Family: Crambidae
- Genus: Bocchoris
- Species: B. inductalis

Binomial name
- Bocchoris inductalis (Walker, 1865)

Synonyms
- Botys inductalis Walker, 1865

Species of moth

Bocchoris inductalis is a moth in the family Crambidae. It was described by Francis Walker in 1865. It is found on Java.
