= Bocchoris manuselalis =

Scientific classification
- Kingdom: Animalia
- Phylum: Arthropoda
- Clade: Pancrustacea
- Class: Insecta
- Order: Lepidoptera
- Family: Crambidae
- Genus: Bocchoris
- Species: B. manuselalis

Binomial name
- Bocchoris manuselalis Rothschild, 1915

Species of moth

Bocchoris manuselalis is a moth in the family Crambidae. It was described by Rothschild in 1915. It is found on Seram.

The wingspan is about 22 mm. The forewings are buff, the basal two-thirds with two yellow bands and numerous transverse lines, spots and rings of deep umber-brown. There are two broad deep umber-brown bands on the outer one-third. The hindwings are buff with two incomplete curved bands and two subterminal band of deep umber-brown.
