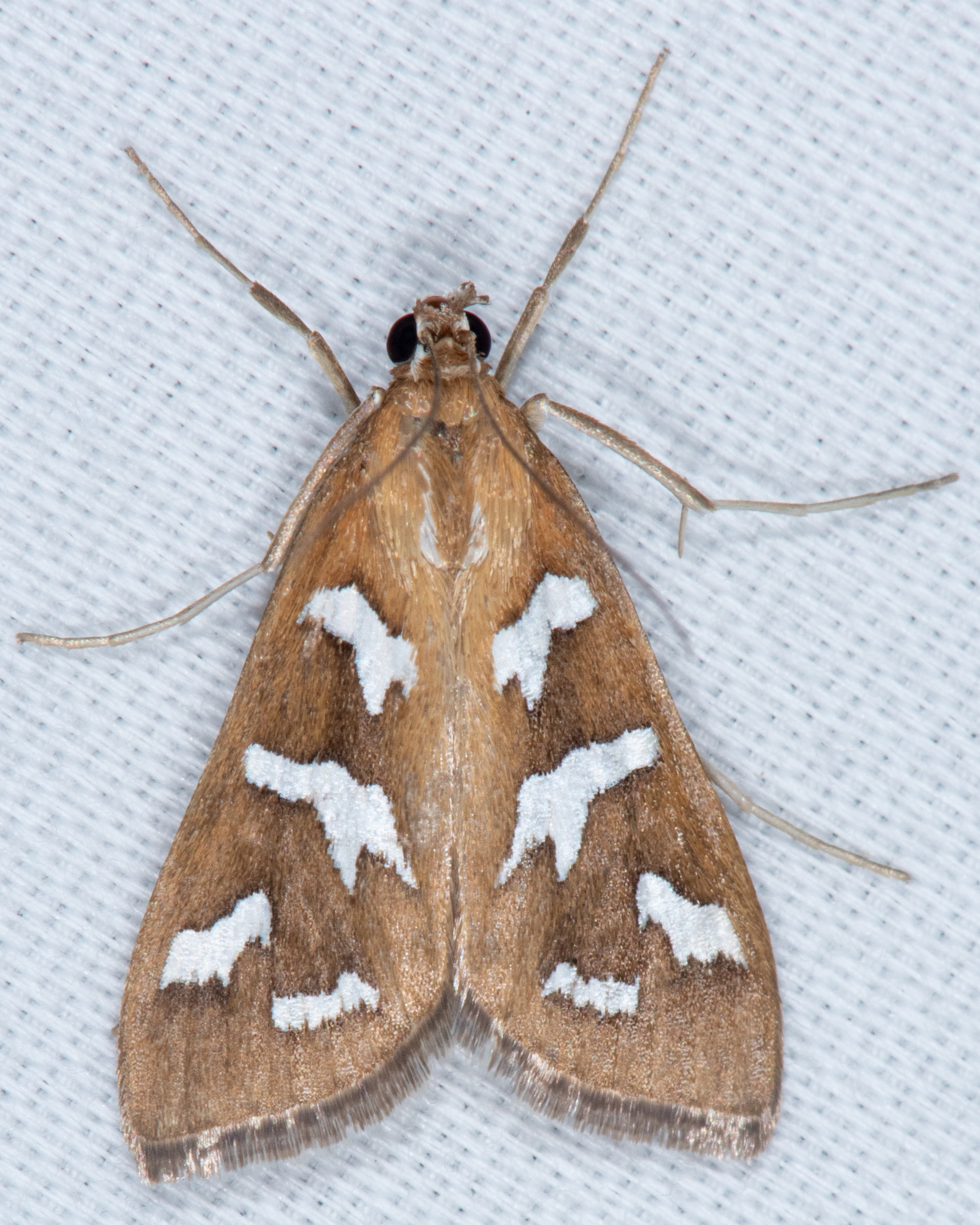

Scientific classification
- Kingdom: Animalia
- Phylum: Arthropoda
- Clade: Pancrustacea
- Class: Insecta
- Order: Lepidoptera
- Family: Crambidae
- Genus: Diastictis
- Species: D. fracturalis

Binomial name
- Diastictis fracturalis (Zeller, 1872)

Synonyms
- Botis fracturalis Zeller, 1872

= Diastictis fracturalis =

Fractured western snout moth

Species of moth

Diastictis fracturalis, the fractured western snout moth, is a species of moth in the family Crambidae. It was described by Philipp Zeller in 1872. It is found in North America, where it has been recorded from the United States (California to South Dakota, Colorado and Louisiana) and Mexico (Sonora, Guerrero, Jalisco).
