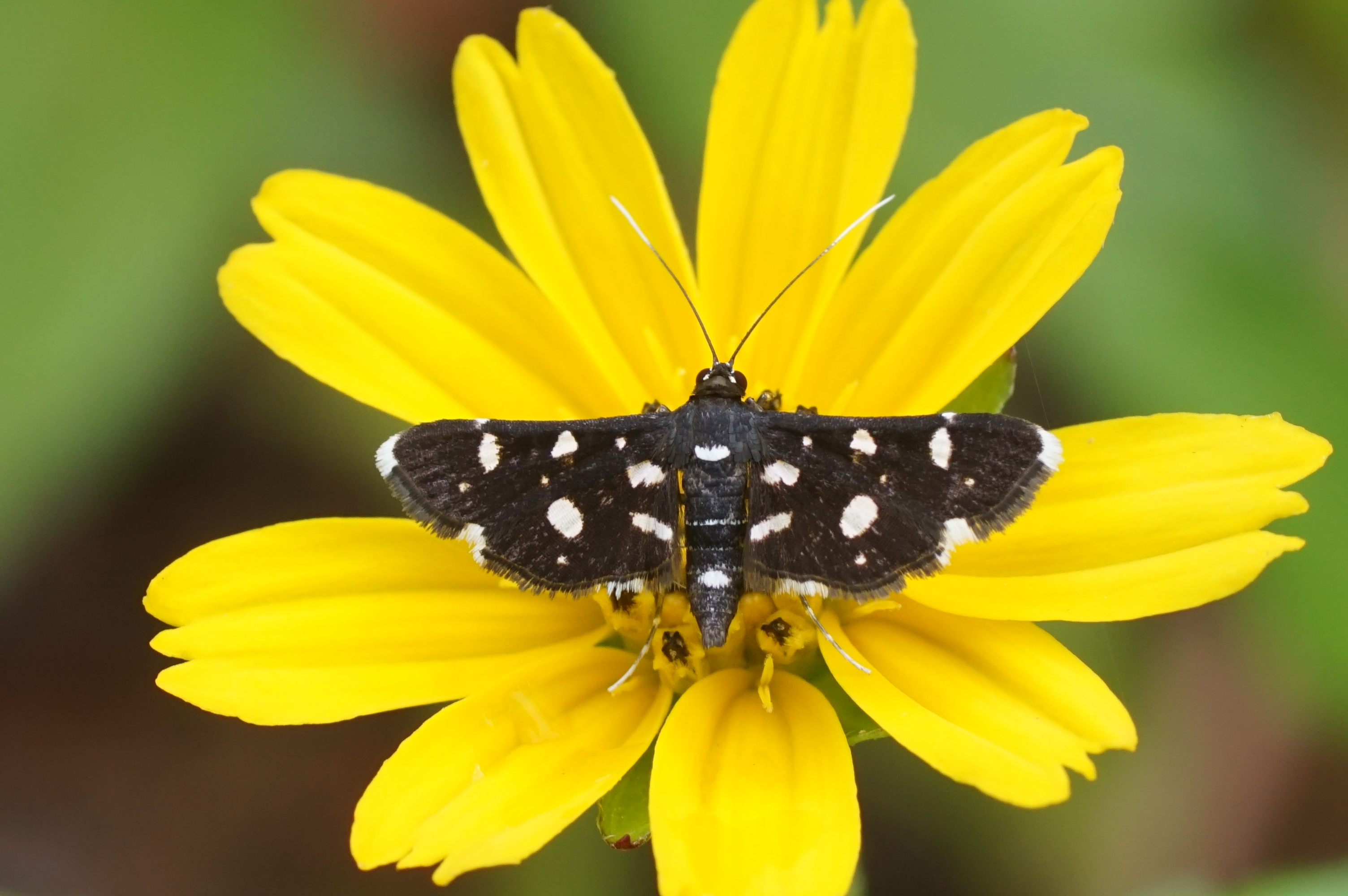

Scientific classification
- Kingdom: Animalia
- Phylum: Arthropoda
- Clade: Pancrustacea
- Class: Insecta
- Order: Lepidoptera
- Family: Crambidae
- Genus: Bocchoris
- Species: B. inspersalis

Binomial name
- Bocchoris inspersalis (Zeller, 1852)

Synonyms
- Botys inspersalis Zeller, 1852; Desmia afflictalis Guenée, 1854; Aediodes bootanalis Walker, 1866; Hymenia pusaensis Bhattacherjee, 1973; Desmia stellalis Butler, 1879

= Bocchoris inspersalis =

Dotted sable

Species of moth

Bocchoris inspersalis, the dotted sable, is a moth of the family Crambidae. It can be found in Sub-Saharan Africa, islands in the Indian Ocean and South and East Asia.

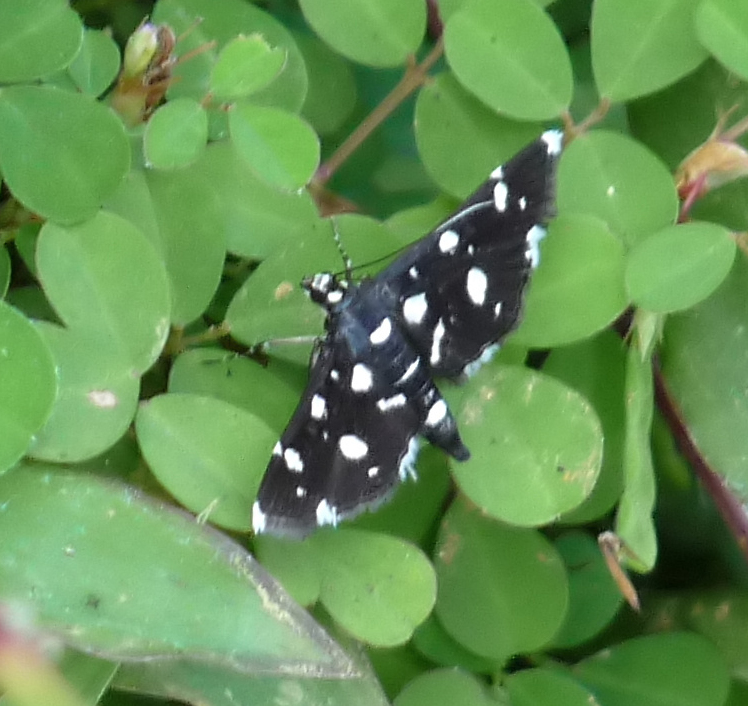
Bocchoris inspersalis on Desmodium triflorum in Kerala

== Foodplants ==
The larvae feed on Malvaceae (Triplochiton scleroxylon).
