= Nausinoe ejectata =

Scientific classification
- Domain: Eukaryota
- Kingdom: Animalia
- Phylum: Arthropoda
- Class: Insecta
- Order: Lepidoptera
- Family: Crambidae
- Genus: Nausinoe
- Species: N. ejectata

Binomial name
- Nausinoe ejectata (Fabricius, 1775)

Synonyms
- Phalaena ejectata Fabricius, 1775

Species of moth

Nausinoe ejectata is a moth in the family Crambidae. It was described by Johan Christian Fabricius in 1775. It is found in India.
