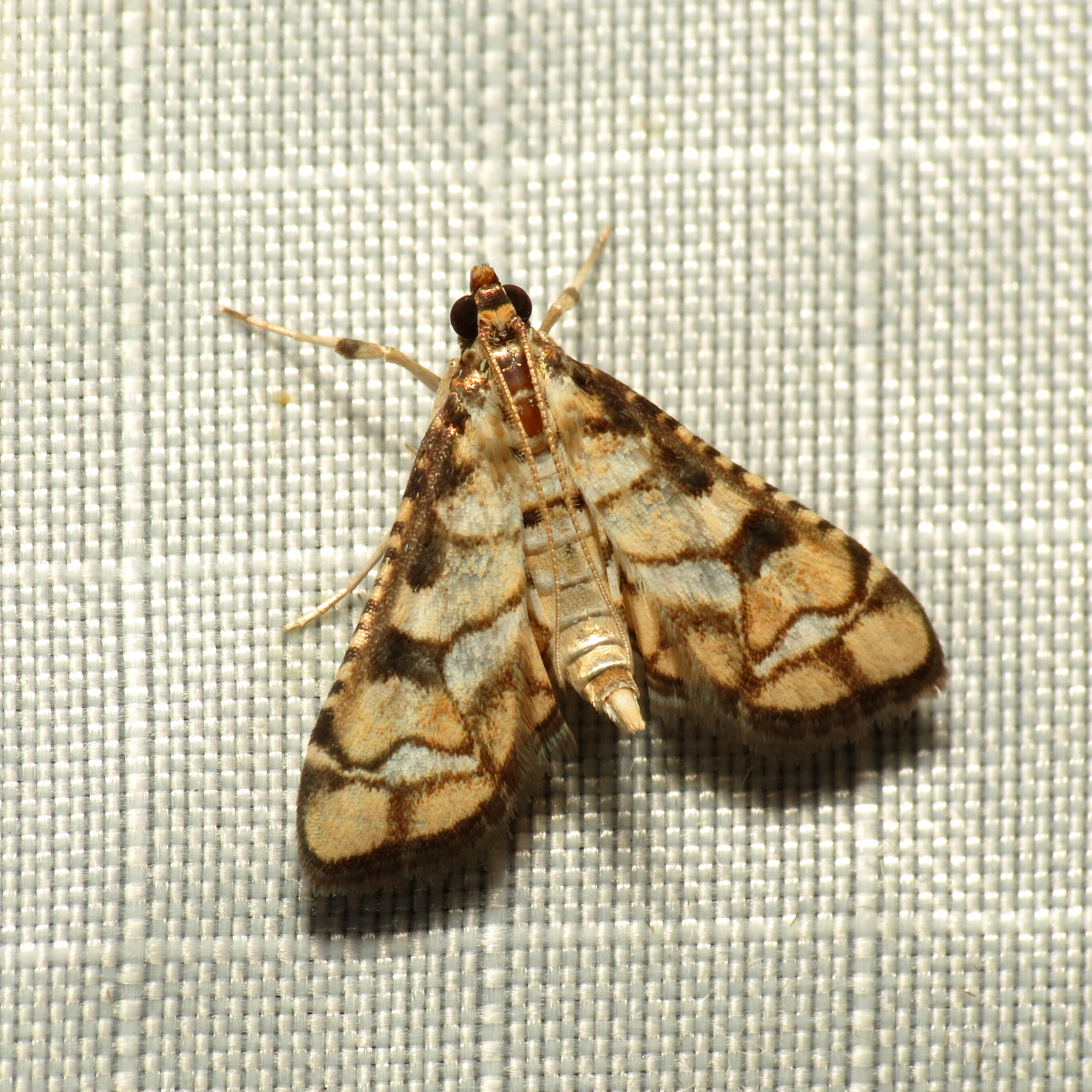

Scientific classification
- Kingdom: Animalia
- Phylum: Arthropoda
- Class: Insecta
- Order: Lepidoptera
- Family: Crambidae
- Genus: Hileithia
- Species: H. magualis

Binomial name
- Hileithia magualis (Guenée, 1854)

Synonyms
- Isopteryx magualis Guenée, 1854; Nacoleia magnalis; Asopia curtalis Walker, 1866; Botys belusalis Walker, 1859; Samea medealis Walker, 1859

= Hileithia magualis =

Species of moth

Hileithia magualis is a species of moth in the family Crambidae. It was described by Achille Guenée in 1854. It is found in the Dominican Republic, Jamaica, Cuba, and the southern United States, where it has been observed in multiple states, including Alabama, Arizona, Florida, Mississippi, Missouri, New Mexico, Oklahoma and Texas.

The wingspan is about 15 mm. Adults are on wing from March to December.
