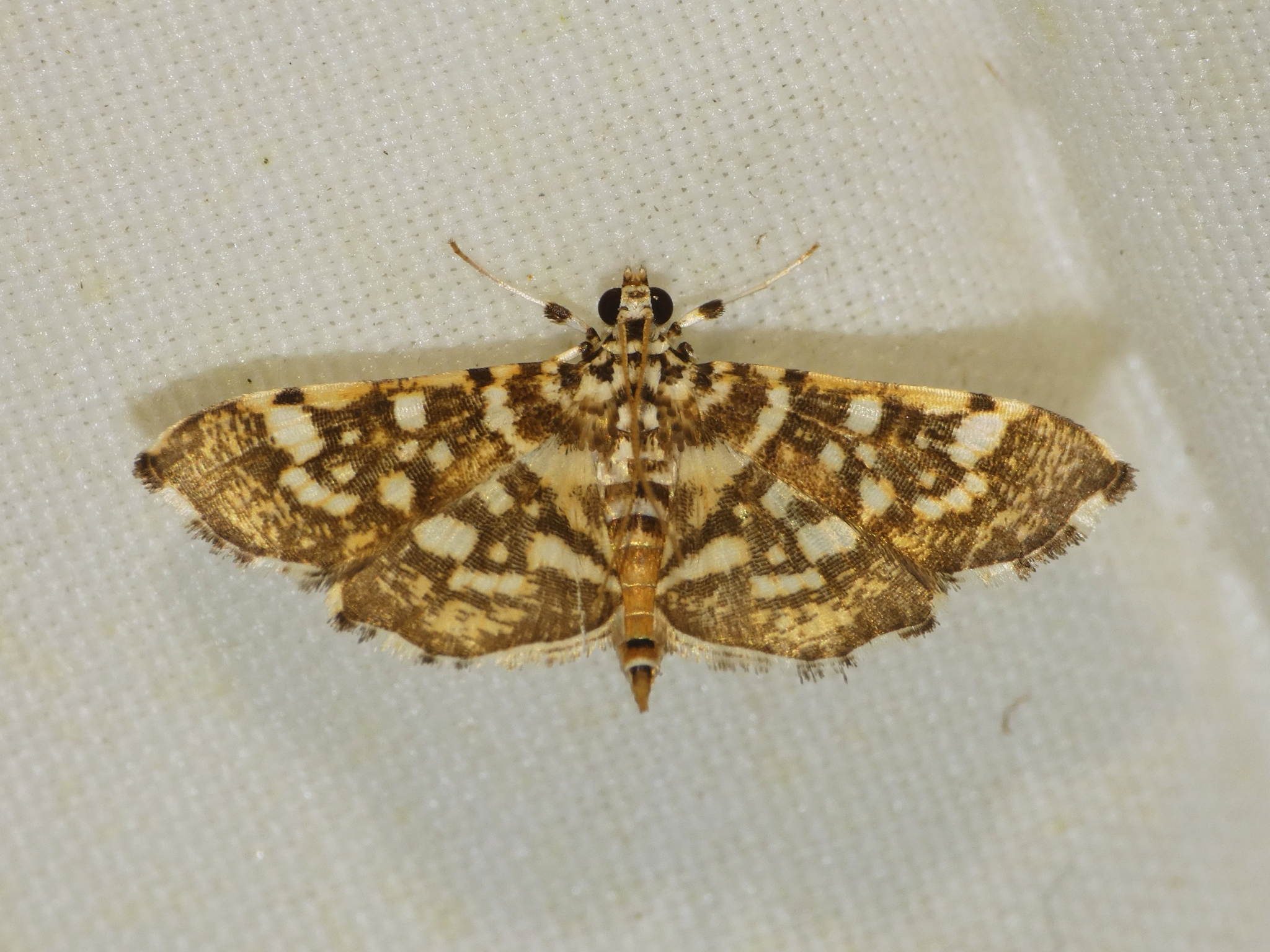

Scientific classification
- Kingdom: Animalia
- Phylum: Arthropoda
- Clade: Pancrustacea
- Class: Insecta
- Order: Lepidoptera
- Family: Crambidae
- Genus: Bocchoris
- Species: B. pulverealis

Binomial name
- Bocchoris pulverealis Hampson, 1898

= Bocchoris pulverealis =

Species of moth

Bocchoris pulverealis is a species of moth in the family Crambidae. It was first described by George Hampson in 1898. It is found on Java.

The wingspan is about 20 mm. The wings are fuscous, irrorated (sprinkled) with yellowish white. There are numerous semihyaline white spots on the basal two-thirds of the forewings. The hindwings have a similar subbasal, medial and postmedial series of spots.
