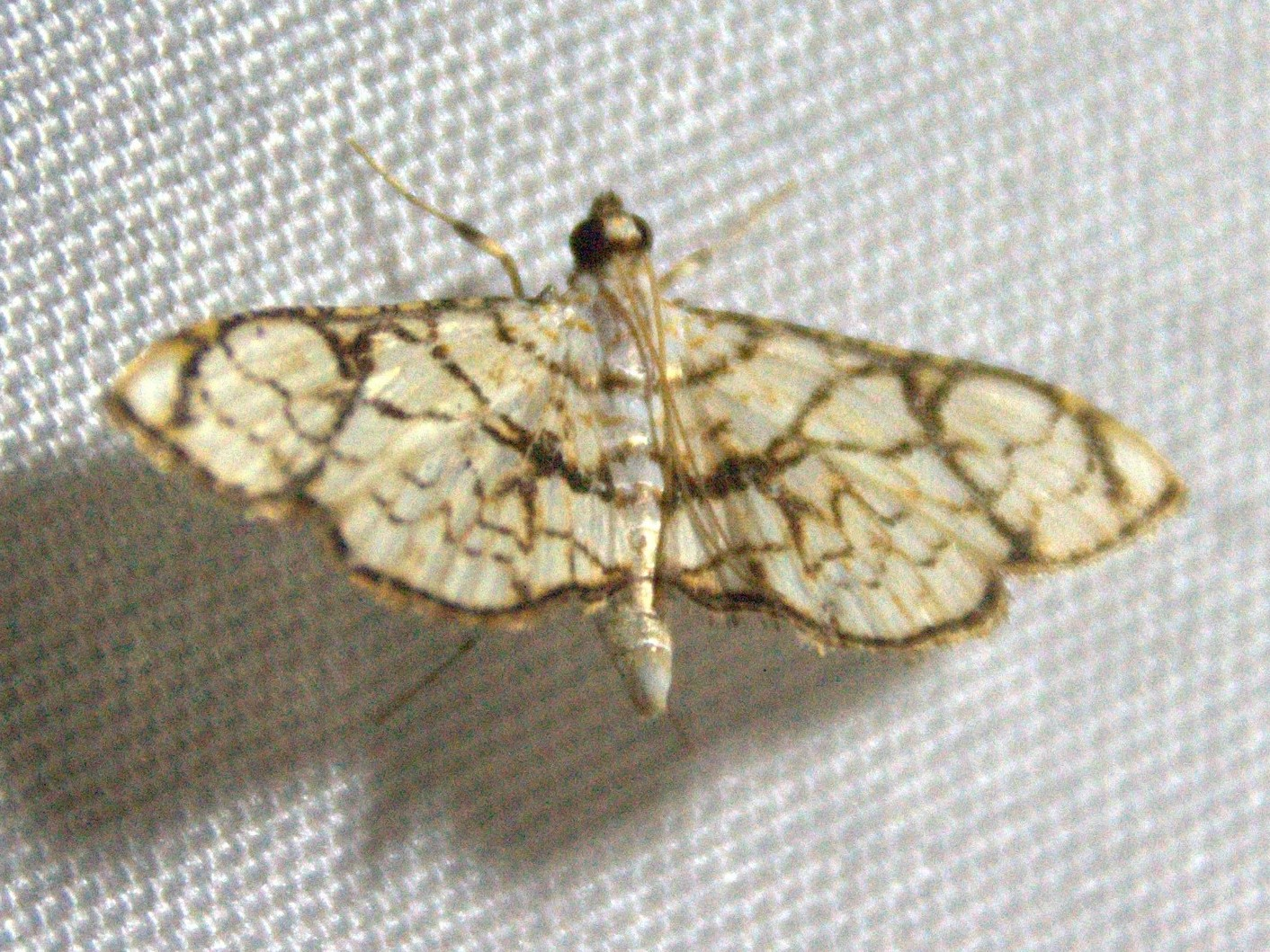

Scientific classification
- Kingdom: Animalia
- Phylum: Arthropoda
- Class: Insecta
- Order: Lepidoptera
- Family: Crambidae
- Genus: Hileithia
- Species: H. obliqualis

Binomial name
- Hileithia obliqualis (Schaus, 1912)

Synonyms
- Bocchoris obliqualis Schaus, 1912

= Hileithia obliqualis =

Species of moth

Hileithia obliqualis is a species of moth in the family Crambidae. It was described by Schaus in 1912. It is found in Costa Rica.
