= Chabula vedonalis =

Scientific classification
- Domain: Eukaryota
- Kingdom: Animalia
- Phylum: Arthropoda
- Class: Insecta
- Order: Lepidoptera
- Family: Crambidae
- Subfamily: Spilomelinae
- Genus: Chabula
- Species: C. vedonalis

Binomial name
- Chabula vedonalis C. Swinhoe, 1894

Species of moth

Chabula vedonalis is a moth of the family Crambidae first described by Charles Swinhoe in 1894. It is found in India.
