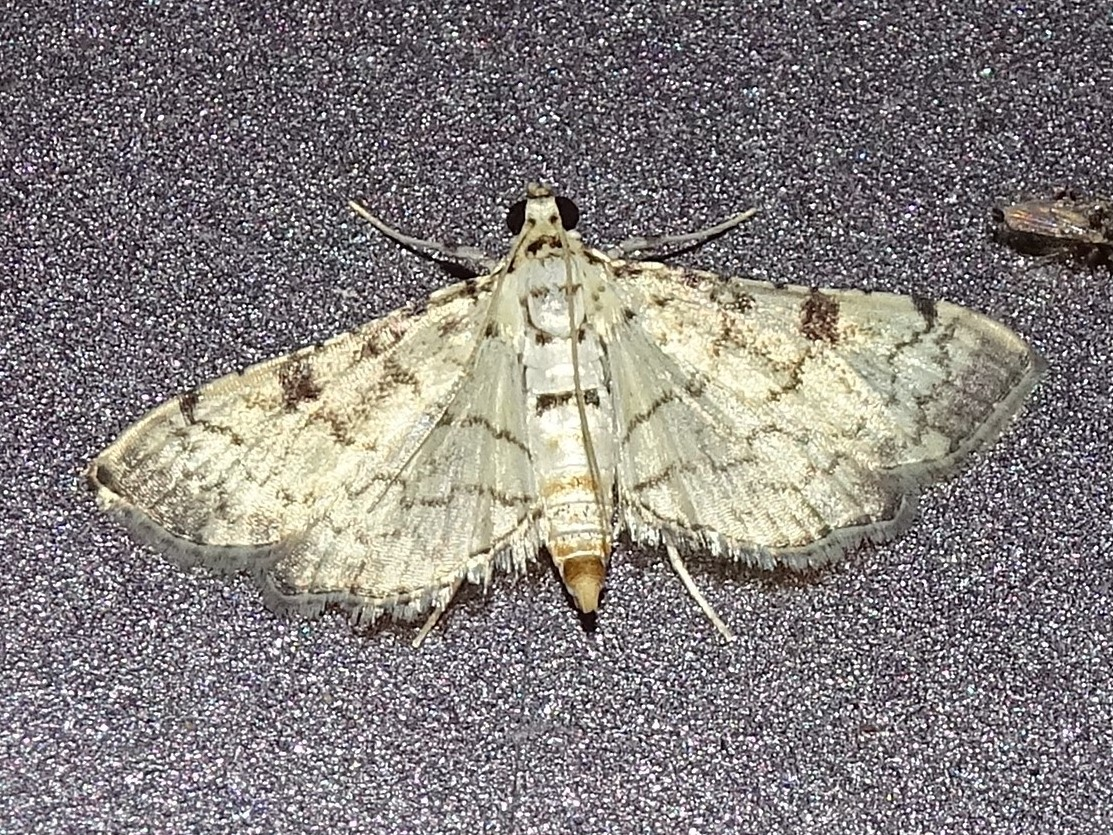

Scientific classification
- Kingdom: Animalia
- Phylum: Arthropoda
- Class: Insecta
- Order: Lepidoptera
- Family: Crambidae
- Genus: Hileithia
- Species: H. differentialis

Binomial name
- Hileithia differentialis (Dyar, 1914)

Synonyms
- Bocchoris differentialis Dyar, 1914

= Hileithia differentialis =

Species of moth

Hileithia differentialis is a species of moth in the family Crambidae. It was described by Harrison Gray Dyar Jr. in 1914. It is found in the US states of Florida and Texas and from the West Indies to Central America (including Panama).

The wingspan is 13–14 mm. The forewings are pale straw yellow with small costal dots. Adults have been recorded on wing from March to April and from July to December in Florida.

The larvae feed on Blechum brownei and Baccharis species.
