= Bocchoris telphusalis =

Scientific classification
- Kingdom: Animalia
- Phylum: Arthropoda
- Clade: Pancrustacea
- Class: Insecta
- Order: Lepidoptera
- Family: Crambidae
- Genus: Bocchoris
- Species: B. telphusalis

Binomial name
- Bocchoris telphusalis (Walker, 1859)

Synonyms
- Glyphodes telphusalis Walker, 1859; Bocchoris fazanalis Swinhoe, 1906; Glyphodes albilunalis Wileman, 1911; Glyphodes uncinalis Pagenstecher, 1884

Species of moth

Bocchoris telphusalis is a moth in the family Crambidae. It was described by Francis Walker in 1859. It is found in Japan, India and Indonesia (including Ambon Island and Borneo).
