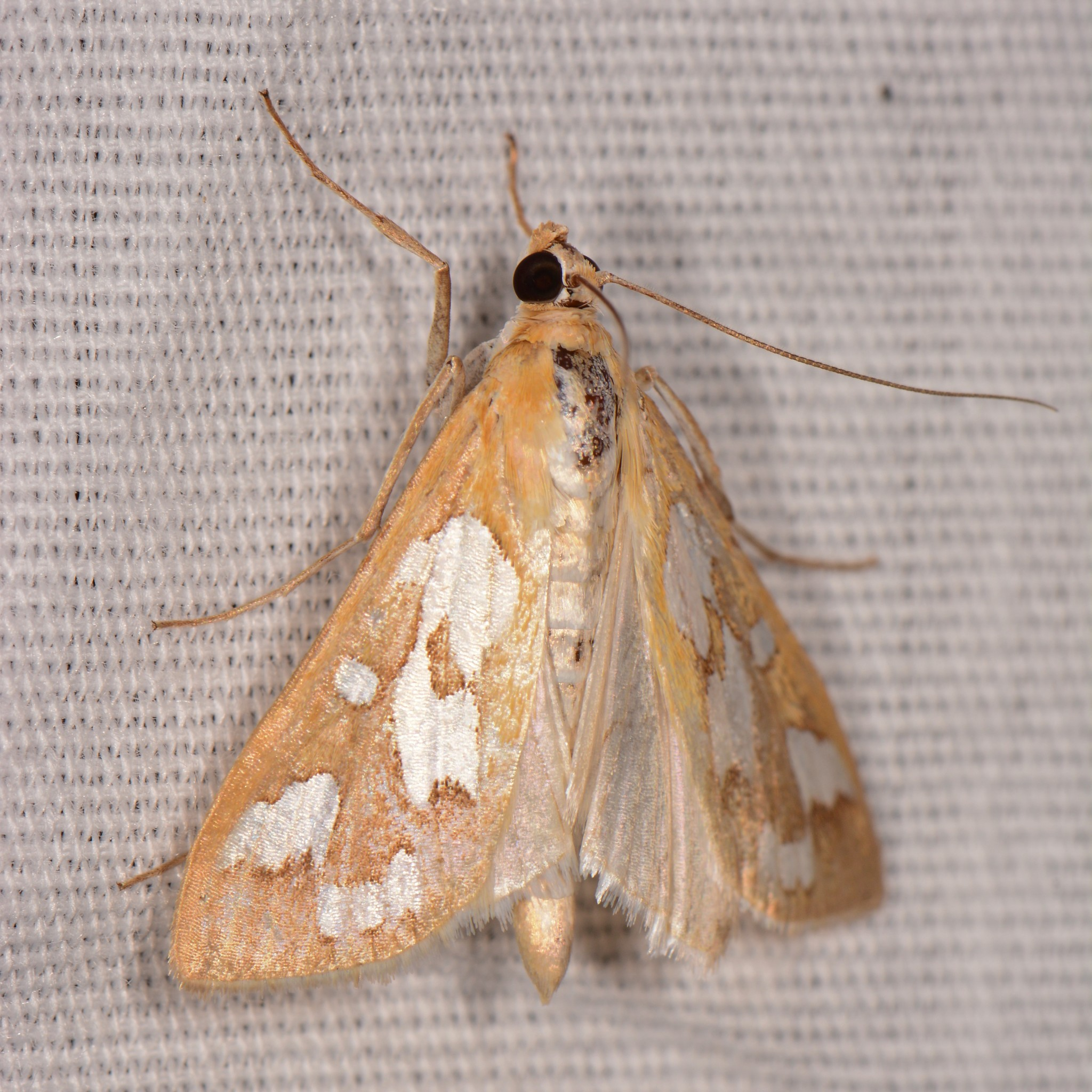

Scientific classification
- Kingdom: Animalia
- Phylum: Arthropoda
- Clade: Pancrustacea
- Class: Insecta
- Order: Lepidoptera
- Family: Crambidae
- Genus: Diastictis
- Species: D. robustior

Binomial name
- Diastictis robustior Munroe, 1956

= Diastictis robustior =

Species of moth

Diastictis robustior is a species of moth in the family Crambidae. It was described by Eugene G. Munroe in 1956. It is found in North America, where it has been recorded from Arizona, Nebraska, Oklahoma and South Dakota.

The wingspan is about 30 mm. Adults have been recorded on wing in June, July and September.
