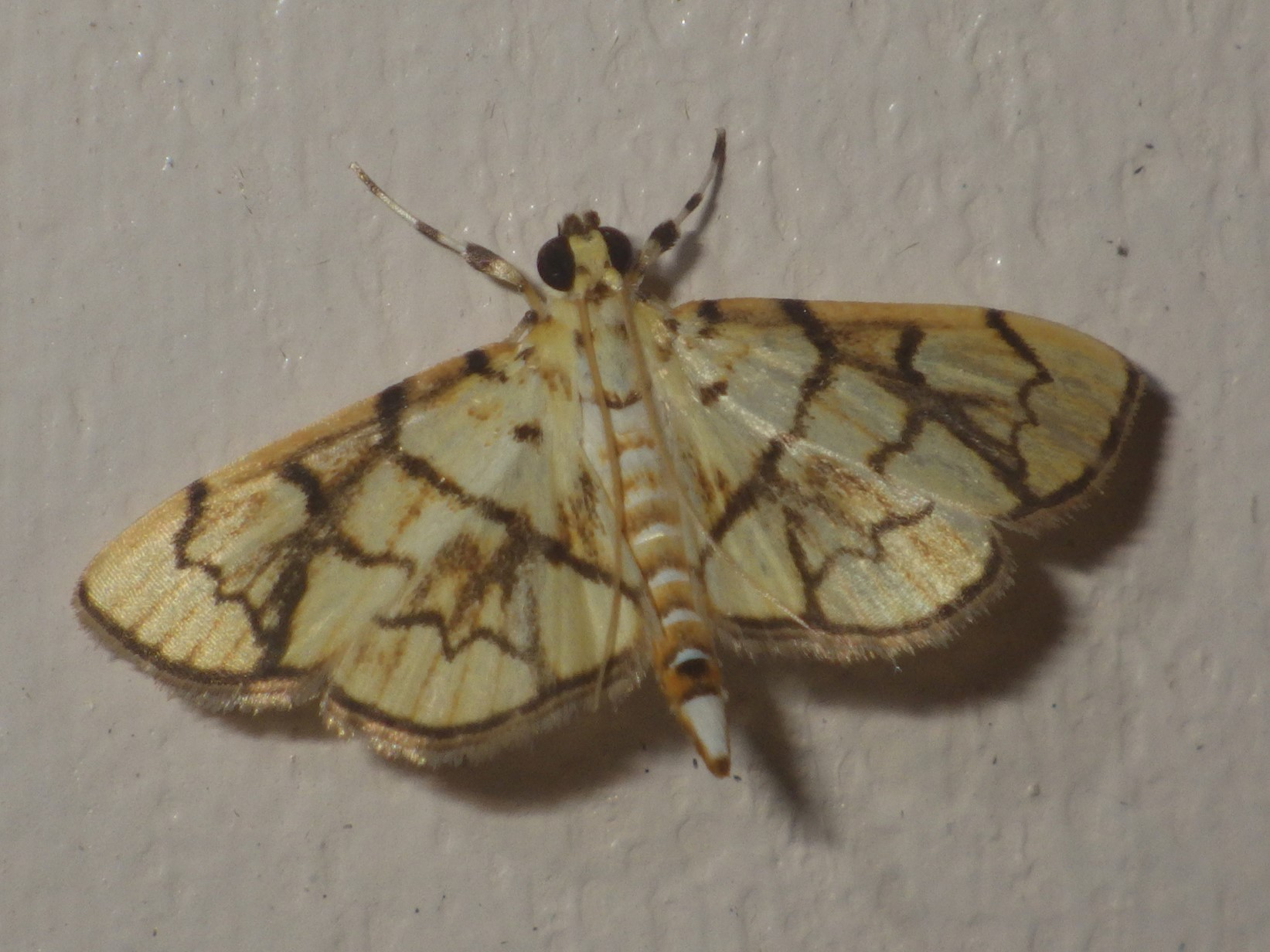

Scientific classification
- Kingdom: Animalia
- Phylum: Arthropoda
- Clade: Pancrustacea
- Class: Insecta
- Order: Lepidoptera
- Family: Crambidae
- Genus: Bocchoris
- Species: B. marucalis

Binomial name
- Bocchoris marucalis (H. Druce, 1895)

Synonyms
- Agrotera marucalis H. Druce, 1895

= Bocchoris marucalis =

Species of moth

Bocchoris marucalis is a species of moth in the family Crambidae. It was first described by Herbert Druce in 1895 and is found in Xalapa, Mexico.

The forewings and hindwings are pale cream colour.
