= Chabulina putrisalis =

Scientific classification
- Kingdom: Animalia
- Phylum: Arthropoda
- Clade: Pancrustacea
- Class: Insecta
- Order: Lepidoptera
- Family: Crambidae
- Genus: Chabulina
- Species: C. putrisalis

Binomial name
- Chabulina putrisalis (Viette, 1958)

Synonyms
- Diastictis putrisalis Viette, 1958; Bocchoris putrisalis

Species of moth

Chabulina putrisalis is a moth in the family Crambidae. It was described by Viette in 1958. It is found on the Comoros (Grande Comore) and Seychelles (Cosmoledo, Aldabra, Menai).
