= Hileithia decostalis =

Scientific classification
- Kingdom: Animalia
- Phylum: Arthropoda
- Class: Insecta
- Order: Lepidoptera
- Family: Crambidae
- Genus: Hileithia
- Species: H. decostalis

Binomial name
- Hileithia decostalis (Guenée, 1854)

Synonyms
- Isopteryx decostalis Guenée, 1854; Hileithia appialis Snellen, 1875; Samea melicertalis Walker, 1859; Zebronia perseusalis Walker, 1859

Species of moth

Hileithia decostalis is a species of moth in the family Crambidae. It was described by Achille Guenée in 1854. It is found in Brazil, Venezuela, the Virgin Islands, Jamaica and Costa Rica. It has also been recorded from the southern United States, where it is only known from Mississippi.
