= Bocchoris insulalis =

Scientific classification
- Kingdom: Animalia
- Phylum: Arthropoda
- Clade: Pancrustacea
- Class: Insecta
- Order: Lepidoptera
- Family: Crambidae
- Genus: Bocchoris
- Species: B. insulalis

Binomial name
- Bocchoris insulalis Hampson, 1912

Species of moth

Bocchoris insulalis is a moth of the family Crambidae. It can be found in Papua New Guinea on Fergusson Island. It has a wingspan of 22 millimetres (0.87 in).
