= Bocchoris placitalis =

Scientific classification
- Kingdom: Animalia
- Phylum: Arthropoda
- Clade: Pancrustacea
- Class: Insecta
- Order: Lepidoptera
- Family: Crambidae
- Genus: Bocchoris
- Species: B. placitalis

Binomial name
- Bocchoris placitalis Schaus, 1912

Species of moth

Bocchoris placitalis is a moth in the family Crambidae. It was described by Schaus in 1912. It is found in Costa Rica.
