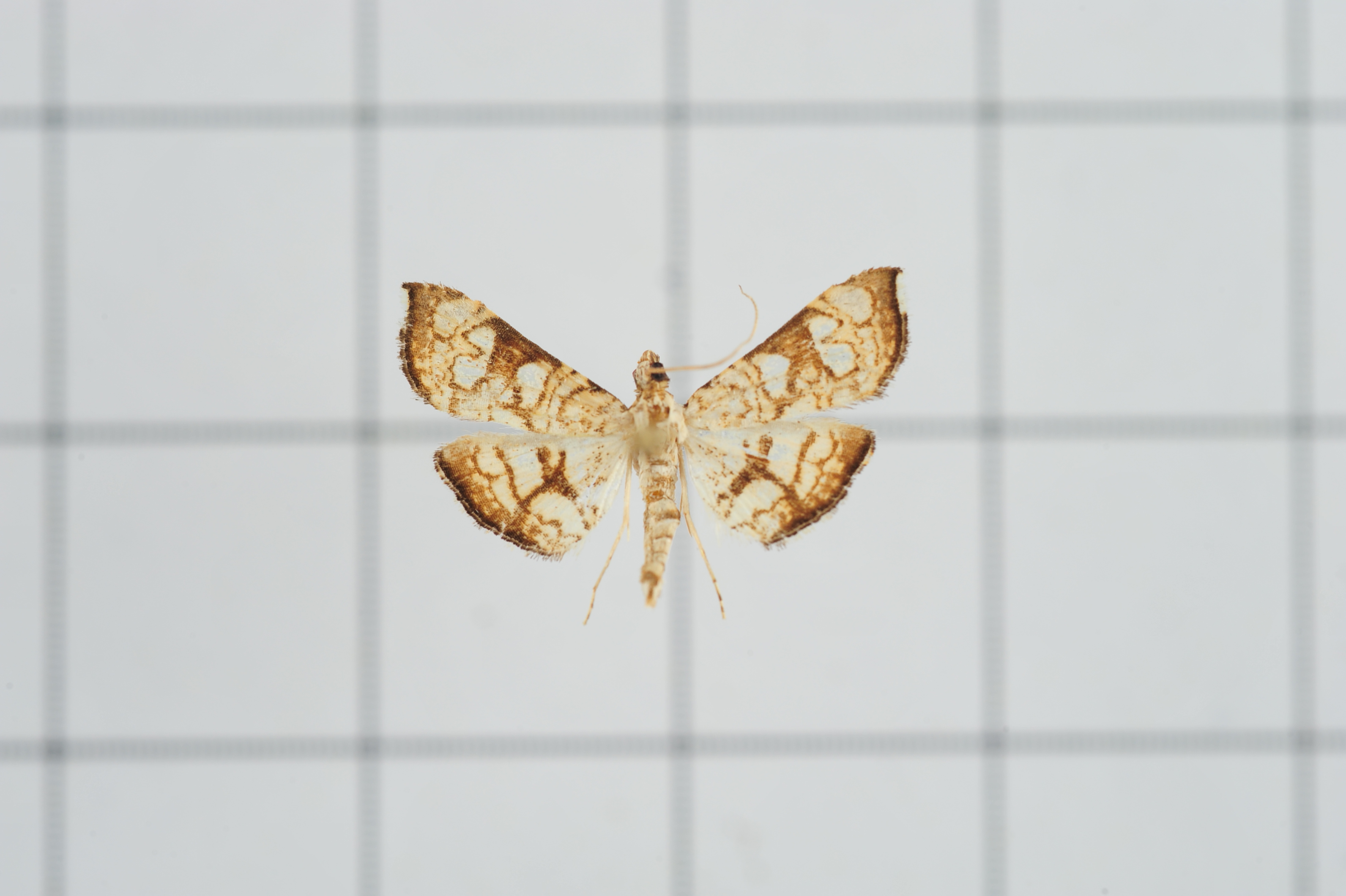
- Bocchoris trivitralis

Scientific classification
- Kingdom: Animalia
- Phylum: Arthropoda
- Clade: Pancrustacea
- Class: Insecta
- Order: Lepidoptera
- Family: Crambidae
- Genus: Bocchoris
- Species: B. trivitralis

Binomial name
- Bocchoris trivitralis C. Swinhoe, 1895

Synonyms
- Chabula trivitralis

= Bocchoris trivitralis =

Species of moth

Bocchoris trivitralis is a species of moth in the family Crambidae. It was described by Charles Swinhoe in 1895. It is found in India, Sri Lanka, Taiwan and Japan.
