= Chabula =

Scientific classification
- Domain: Eukaryota
- Kingdom: Animalia
- Phylum: Arthropoda
- Class: Insecta
- Order: Lepidoptera
- Family: Crambidae
- Subfamily: Spilomelinae
- Genus: Chabula; Moore, 1886

Genus of moths

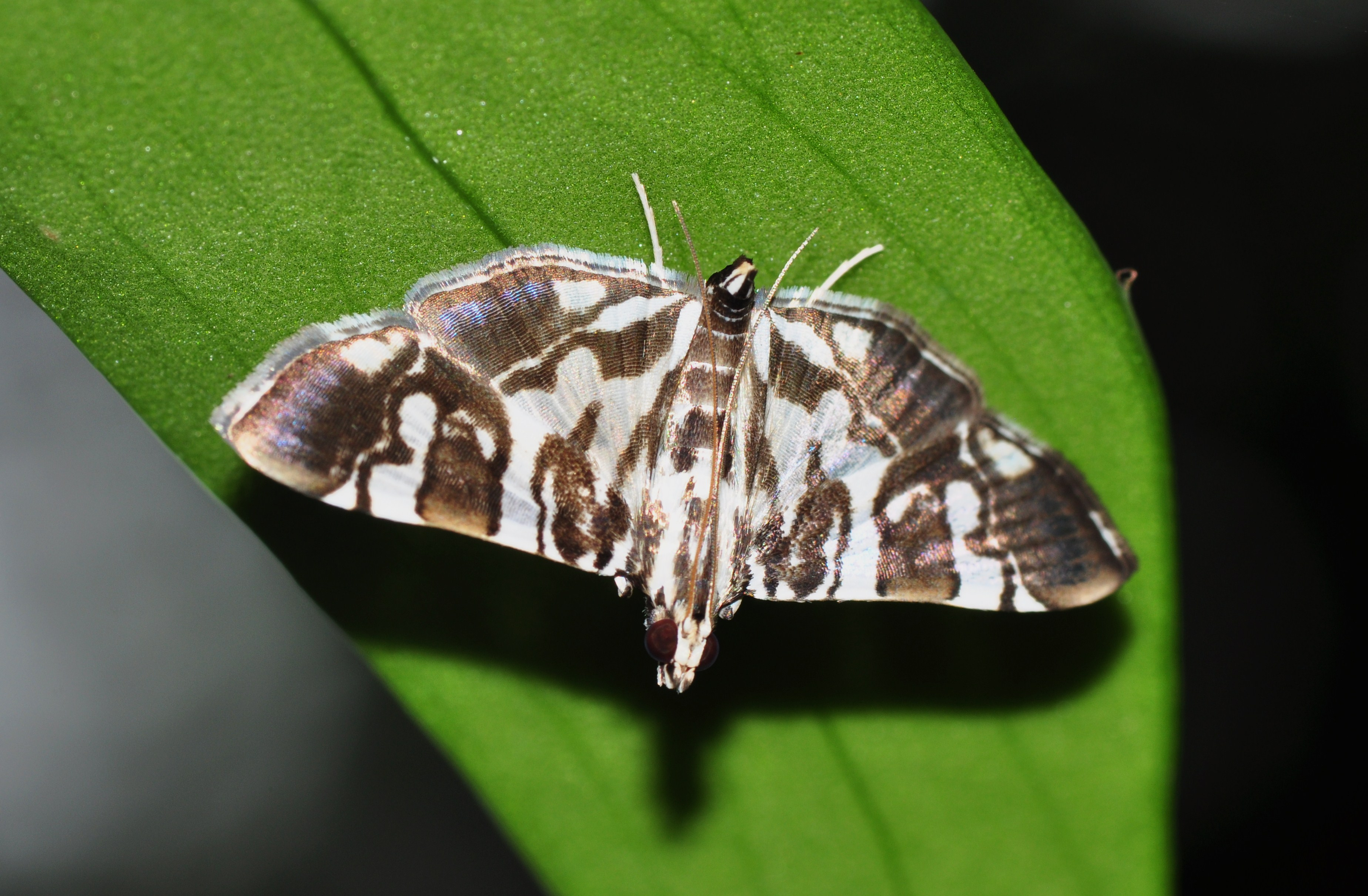
Chabula moth.

Chabula is a genus of moths of the family Crambidae.

== Species ==
- Chabula acamasalis (Walker, 1859)
- Chabula vedonalis Swinhoe, 1894
