= Nausinoe globulipedalis =

Scientific classification
- Kingdom: Animalia
- Phylum: Arthropoda
- Clade: Pancrustacea
- Class: Insecta
- Order: Lepidoptera
- Family: Crambidae
- Genus: Nausinoe
- Species: N. globulipedalis

Binomial name
- Nausinoe globulipedalis (Walker, 1866)

Synonyms
- Glyphodes globulipedalis Walker, 1866; Phalangiodes columalis Snellen, 1880

Species of moth

Nausinoe globulipedalis is a moth in the family Crambidae. It was described by Francis Walker in 1866. It is found in Indonesia (Sulawesi), New Guinea and Australia, where it has been recorded from Queensland.

Adults are brown with dark-edged white spots and patches on the wings.
