= Nausinoe velialis =

Scientific classification
- Domain: Eukaryota
- Kingdom: Animalia
- Phylum: Arthropoda
- Class: Insecta
- Order: Lepidoptera
- Family: Crambidae
- Genus: Nausinoe
- Species: N. velialis

Binomial name
- Nausinoe velialis (Gaede, 1917)

Synonyms
- Lepyrodes velialis Gaede, 1917

Species of moth

Nausinoe velialis is a moth in the family Crambidae, described by Max Gaede in 1917. It is found in Tanzania.
