= Bocchoris chalcidiscalis =

Scientific classification
- Kingdom: Animalia
- Phylum: Arthropoda
- Clade: Pancrustacea
- Class: Insecta
- Order: Lepidoptera
- Family: Crambidae
- Genus: Bocchoris
- Species: B. chalcidiscalis

Binomial name
- Bocchoris chalcidiscalis Hampson, 1898

Species of moth

Bocchoris chalcidiscalis is a moth in the family Crambidae. It was described by George Hampson in 1898. It is found in Espírito Santo, Brazil.

The wingspan is about 20 mm. The forewings are golden brown with white margins, as well as a white speck in the cell and one on the discocellulars. The hindwings are white.
