= Bocchoris darsanalis =

Scientific classification
- Kingdom: Animalia
- Phylum: Arthropoda
- Clade: Pancrustacea
- Class: Insecta
- Order: Lepidoptera
- Family: Crambidae
- Genus: Bocchoris
- Species: B. darsanalis

Binomial name
- Bocchoris darsanalis (H. Druce, 1895)

Synonyms
- Agrotera darsanalis H. Druce, 1895

Species of moth

Bocchoris darsanalis is a moth in the family Crambidae. It was described by Herbert Druce in 1895. It is found in Mexico (Jalapa) and Panama.

The forewings and hindwings are white, crossed with very fine brown lines from the costal to the inner margin. The first two near the base, the others beyond. The forewings have a dark spot on the middle of the costal margin.
