= Chabulina =

Scientific classification
- Kingdom: Animalia
- Phylum: Arthropoda
- Clade: Pancrustacea
- Class: Insecta
- Order: Lepidoptera
- Family: Crambidae
- Tribe: Margaroniini
- Genus: Chabulina; J. C. Shaffer & Munroe, 2007

Genus of moths

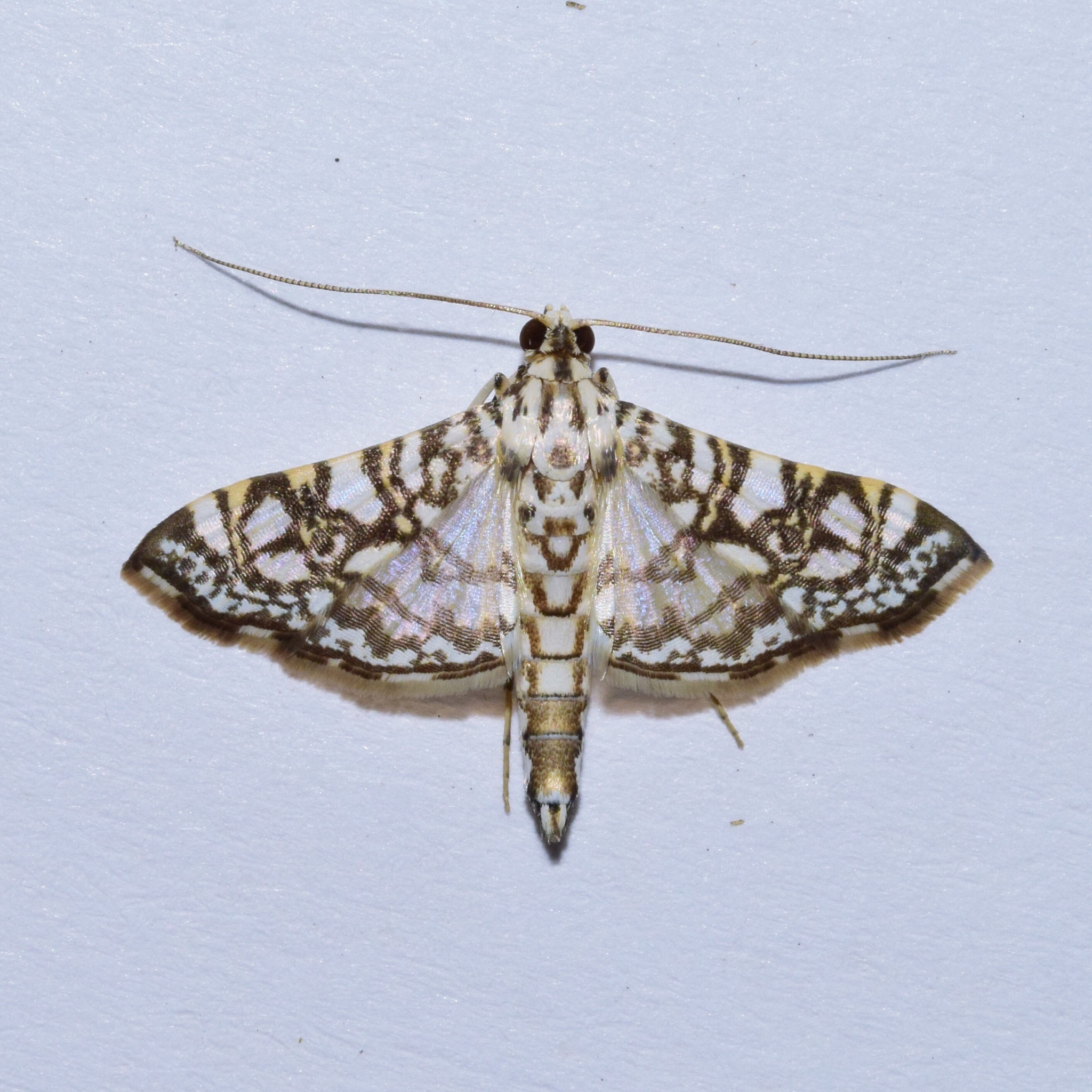

Chabulina is a genus of moths of the family Crambidae. Jay C. Shaffer and Eugene Munroe described the genus in 2007, containing the type species Ch. putrisalis and one additional species, Ch. tenera. In 2022, Koen Maes revised the genus and added another eight species.

== Species ==
- Chabulina albinalis (Hampson, 1912)
- Chabulina amphipeda (Meyrick, 1939)
- Chabulina astomalis (R. Felder & Rogenhofer, 1875)
- Chabulina bleusei (Oberthür, 1887)
- Chabulina celebesensis (Sutrisno & Ubaidillah, 2026)
- Chabulina cineralis (Joannis, 1912)
- Chabulina labarinthalis (Hampson, 1912)
- Chabulina nuclealis (Joannis, 1927)
- Chabulina onychinalis (Guenée, 1854)
- Chabulina putrisalis (Viette, 1958)
- Chabulina tenera (Butler, 1883)
