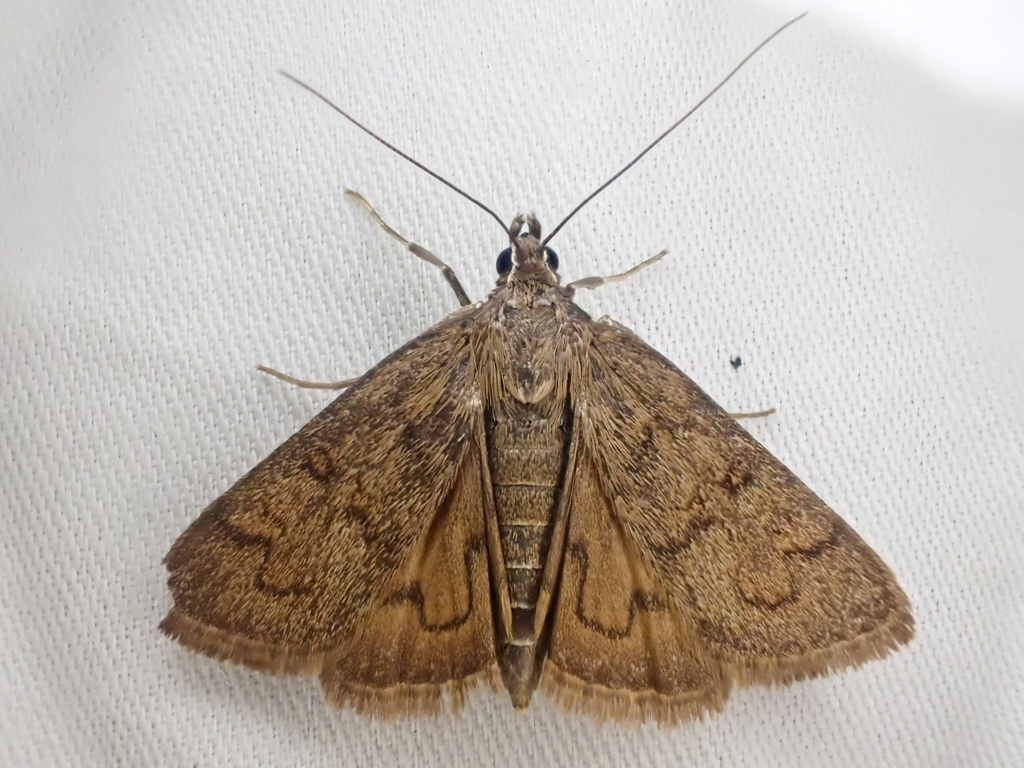

Scientific classification
- Kingdom: Animalia
- Phylum: Arthropoda
- Clade: Pancrustacea
- Class: Insecta
- Order: Lepidoptera
- Family: Crambidae
- Genus: Diastictis
- Species: D. caecalis

Binomial name
- Diastictis caecalis (Warren, 1892)

Synonyms
- Anomostictis caecalis Warren, 1892

= Diastictis caecalis =

Species of moth

Diastictis caecalis is a species of moth in the family Crambidae. It was described by William Warren in 1892. It is found in North America, where it has been recorded from California.
