= Hileithia rhealis =

Scientific classification
- Kingdom: Animalia
- Phylum: Arthropoda
- Class: Insecta
- Order: Lepidoptera
- Family: Crambidae
- Genus: Hileithia
- Species: H. rhealis

Binomial name
- Hileithia rhealis (H. Druce, 1895)

Synonyms
- Pterygisus rhealis H. Druce, 1895

Species of moth

Hileithia rhealis is a species of moth in the family Crambidae. It was described by Herbert Druce in 1895. It is found in Guerrero, Mexico.

== Description ==
The forewings and hindwings are creamy white, the former with the base and the costal margin thickly spotted with black, and with four narrow black lines crossing from the costal to the inner margin. The first two joined on the inner margin and the second and third connected by a fine line. The hindwings are crossed by three black lines. The marginal line is black.
