= Nausinoe piabilis =

Scientific classification
- Kingdom: Animalia
- Phylum: Arthropoda
- Class: Insecta
- Order: Lepidoptera
- Family: Crambidae
- Genus: Nausinoe
- Species: N. piabilis

Binomial name
- Nausinoe piabilis (Wallengren, 1876)

Synonyms
- Lepyrodes piabilis Wallengren, 1876

Species of moth

Nausinoe piabilis is a moth in the family Crambidae. It was described by Wallengren in 1876. It is found in South Africa.
