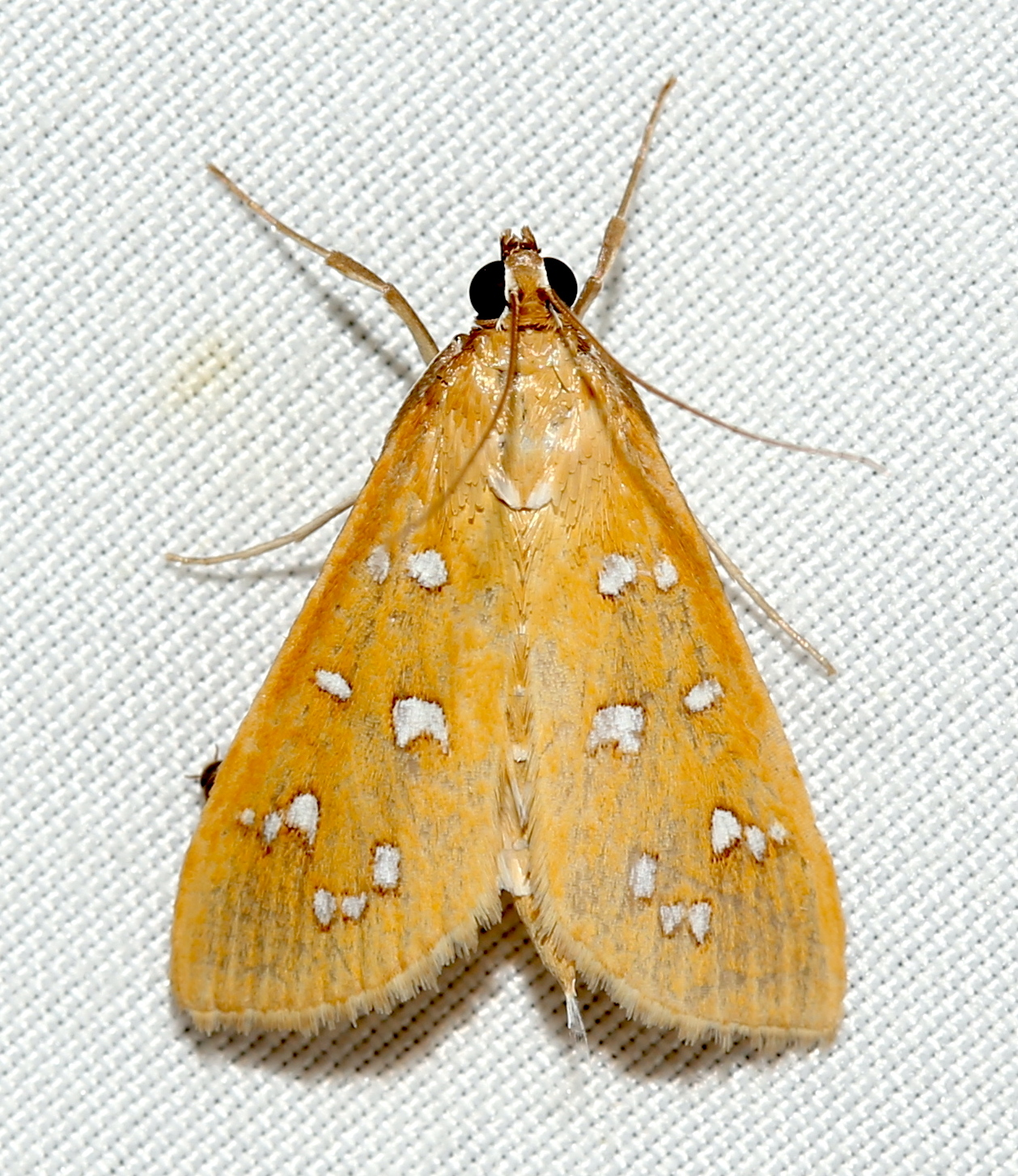

Scientific classification
- Kingdom: Animalia
- Phylum: Arthropoda
- Class: Insecta
- Order: Lepidoptera
- Family: Crambidae
- Genus: Diastictis
- Species: D. argyralis

Binomial name
- Diastictis argyralis Hübner, 1818

= Diastictis argyralis =

White-spotted orange moth

Species of moth

Diastictis argyralis, the white-spotted orange moth, is a moth in the family Crambidae. It was described by Jacob Hübner in 1818. It is found in North America, where it has been recorded from Colorado, Florida, Georgia, Indiana, Maine, Maryland, Mississippi, North Carolina, Ohio, Ontario, South Carolina, Tennessee, Texas and Virginia.

The wingspan is about 21 mm. Adults are on wing from May to August in most of the range, but from March to December in Florida.
