= Bocchoris adalis =

Scientific classification
- Kingdom: Animalia
- Phylum: Arthropoda
- Clade: Pancrustacea
- Class: Insecta
- Order: Lepidoptera
- Family: Crambidae
- Genus: Bocchoris
- Species: B. adalis

Binomial name
- Bocchoris adalis (Walker, 1859)

Synonyms
- Botys adalis Walker, 1859

Species of moth

Bocchoris adalis is a moth in the family Crambidae. It was described by Francis Walker in 1859. It is found in Tefé, Brazil.
