= Bocchoris gallienalis =

Scientific classification
- Kingdom: Animalia
- Phylum: Arthropoda
- Clade: Pancrustacea
- Class: Insecta
- Order: Lepidoptera
- Family: Crambidae
- Genus: Bocchoris
- Species: B. gallienalis

Binomial name
- Bocchoris gallienalis (Viette, 1958)

Synonyms
- Diastictis gallienalis Viette, 1958

Species of moth

Bocchoris gallienalis is a moth in the family Crambidae. It was described by Viette in 1958. It is found in Madagascar.
