= Bocchoris rufiflavalis =

Scientific classification
- Kingdom: Animalia
- Phylum: Arthropoda
- Clade: Pancrustacea
- Class: Insecta
- Order: Lepidoptera
- Family: Crambidae
- Genus: Bocchoris
- Species: B. rufiflavalis

Binomial name
- Bocchoris rufiflavalis Hampson, 1912

Species of moth

Bocchoris rufiflavalis is a moth of the family Crambidae. It can be found in Madagascar.

The head and thorax are rufous mixed with yellow, the abdomen is white with rufous segmental lines. Fore wings are yellow suffused with rufous; an antemedial yellow spot below the cell defined by brown, a small v-shaped brown mark in cell just beyond it with yellow centre, a medial yellow patch from subcostal nervure to vein 1, defined by brown and expanding below the cell; a yellow band beyond the cell from below costa to vein 2, expanding somewhat at the middle, defined on inner side by brown and on outer by the postmedial line which is incurved below costa, excurved between veins 5 and 2, then retracted to lower angle of the cell and sinuous to the inner margin, with series of small yellow spots beyond it; some slight yellow marks on termen; cilia chequered yellow and rufous.

Hind wings are yellow with a small rufous spot in the cell and elliptical discoidal annulus; postmedial line rufous, incurved below costa, bent outwards between veins 5 and 2, then oblique; a curved crenulate subterminal line, the apical area suffused with rufous; a terminal rufous line and a line through the cilia.

It has a wingspan of 20 millimetres (0.79 in).
