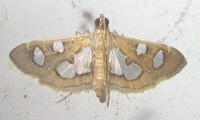

Scientific classification
- Kingdom: Animalia
- Phylum: Arthropoda
- Clade: Pancrustacea
- Class: Insecta
- Order: Lepidoptera
- Family: Crambidae
- Genus: Bocchoris
- Species: B. borbonensis

Binomial name
- Bocchoris borbonensis Guillermet, 1996

= Bocchoris borbonensis =

Species of moth

Bocchoris borbonensis is a moth of the family Crambidae described by Christian Guillermet in 1996. It can be found in Réunion. where it can be found in remaining natural habitats of dry areas.

It has a wingspan of 14–15 mm.
