= Nankogobinda =

Scientific classification
- Kingdom: Animalia
- Phylum: Arthropoda
- Class: Insecta
- Order: Lepidoptera
- Family: Crambidae
- Subfamily: Pyraustinae
- Genus: Nankogobinda; Rose & Singh-Kirti, 1986
- Species: N. artificialis

Binomial name
- Nankogobinda artificialis (Lederer, 1863)

Synonyms
- Botys artificalis Lederer, 1863; Aediodes abstrusalis Moore, 1882; Aediodes inscitalis Walker, 1866

Genus of moths

Nankogobinda is a genus of moths of the family Crambidae. It contains only one species, Nankogobinda artificialis, is found in Brazil and Australia.
