= Hileithia sparsalis =

Scientific classification
- Kingdom: Animalia
- Phylum: Arthropoda
- Class: Insecta
- Order: Lepidoptera
- Family: Crambidae
- Genus: Hileithia
- Species: H. sparsalis

Binomial name
- Hileithia sparsalis (Dyar, 1914)

Synonyms
- Bocchoris sparsalis Dyar, 1914

Species of moth

Hileithia sparsalis is a species of moth in the family Crambidae. It was described by Harrison Gray Dyar Jr. in 1914. It is found in Panama.

== Description ==
The wingspan is about 12 mm. The wings are straw yellow tinged with small costal dots on the forewings. There is a dark shade along the margins of both wings.
