= Hileithia edaphodrepta =

Scientific classification
- Kingdom: Animalia
- Phylum: Arthropoda
- Class: Insecta
- Order: Lepidoptera
- Family: Crambidae
- Genus: Hileithia
- Species: H. edaphodrepta

Binomial name
- Hileithia edaphodrepta (Dyar, 1914)

Synonyms
- Bocchoris edaphodrepta Dyar, 1914

Species of moth

Hileithia edaphodrepta is a species of moth in the family Crambidae. It was described by Harrison Gray Dyar Jr. in 1914. It is found in Panama.

== Description ==
The wingspan is about 11.5 mm. The base of the forewings is dotted with black with slender dark lines. The hindwings have a solid discal dot and with a black shade to the inner margin.
