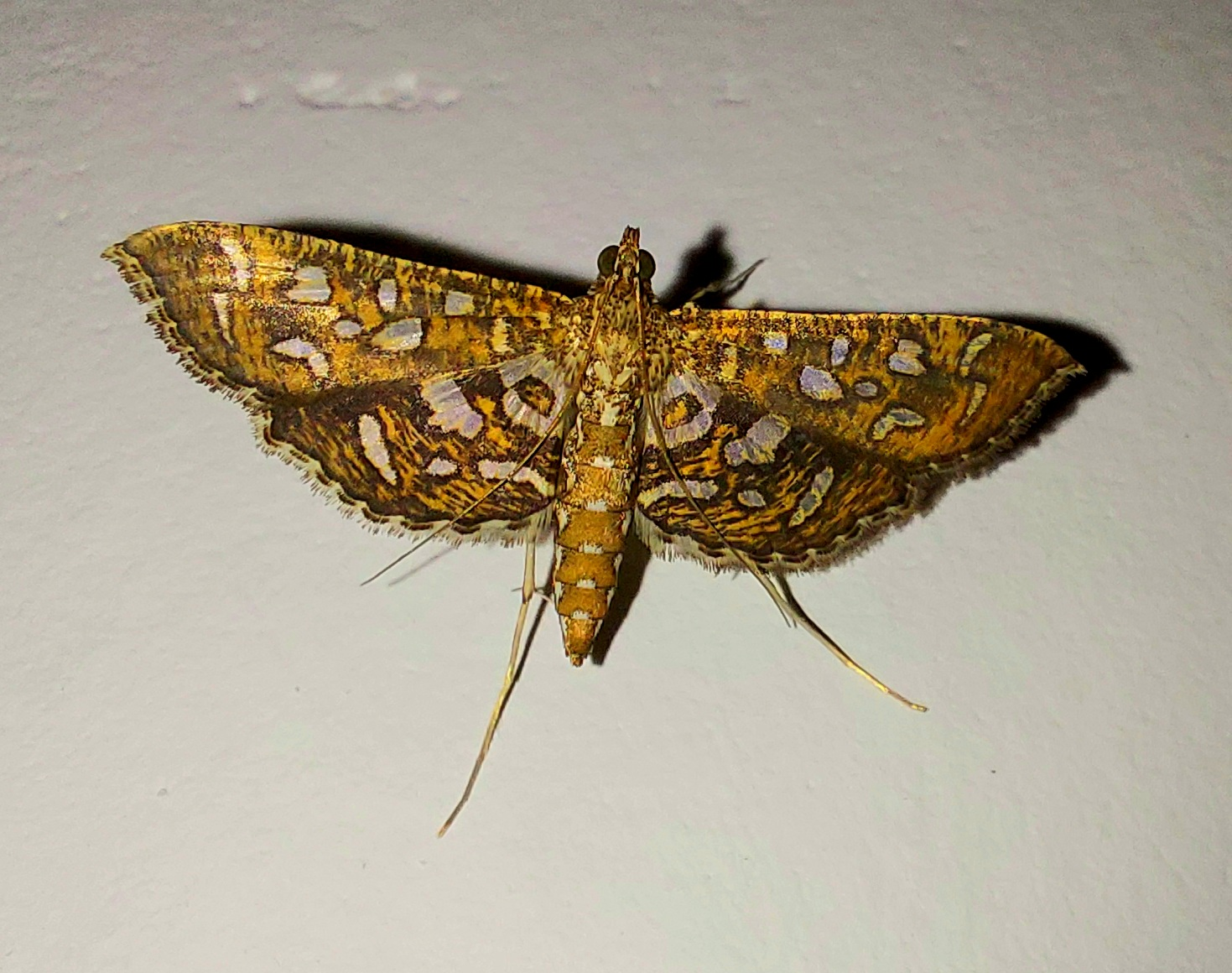

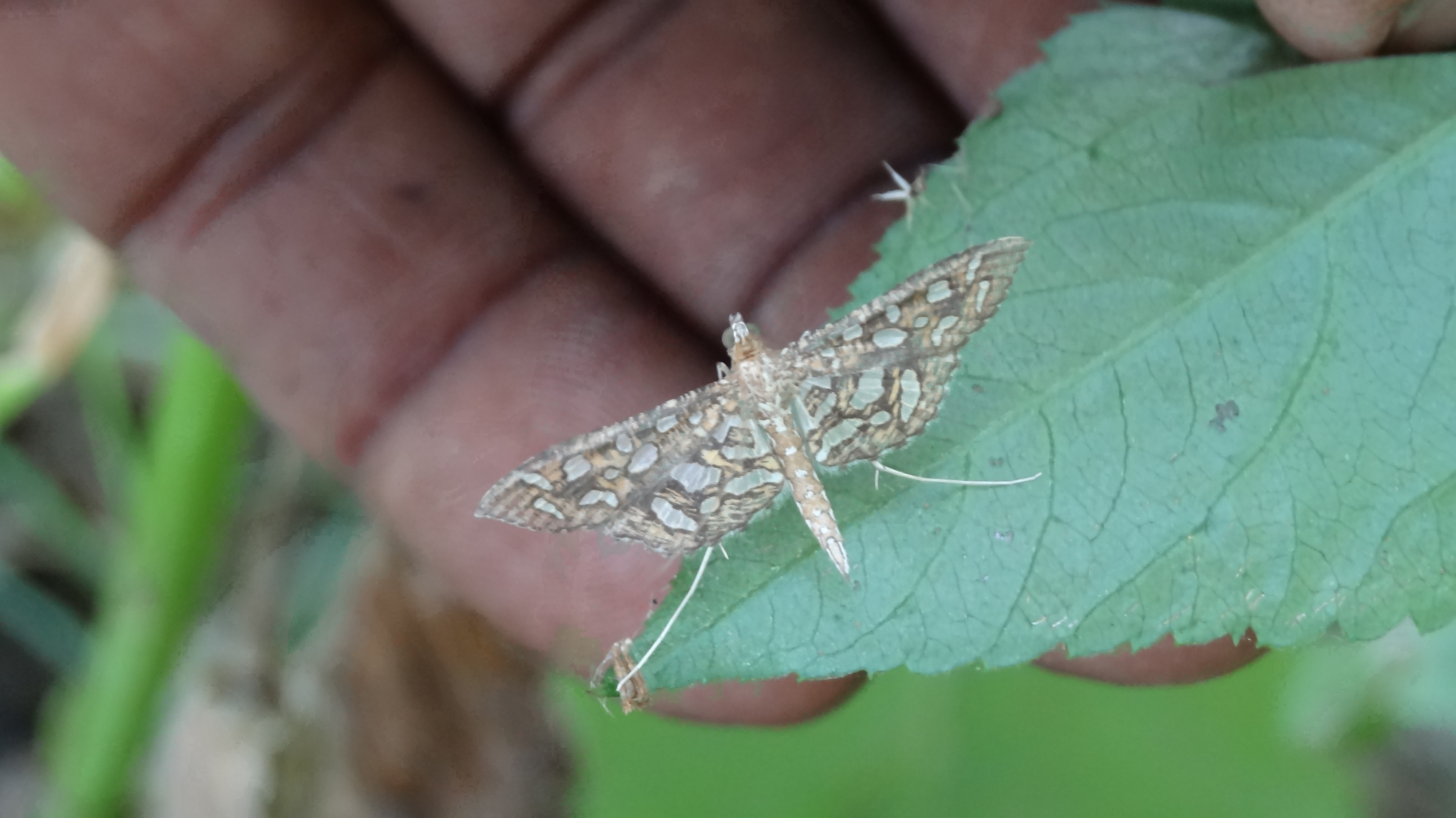

Scientific classification
- Kingdom: Animalia
- Phylum: Arthropoda
- Class: Insecta
- Order: Lepidoptera
- Family: Crambidae
- Genus: Nausinoe
- Species: N. geometralis

Binomial name
- Nausinoe geometralis (Guenée, 1854)

Synonyms
- Lepyrodes geometralis Guenée, 1854; Lepyrodes geometricalis Lederer, 1863 (misspelling)

= Nausinoe geometralis =

Species of moth

Nausinoe geometralis is a species of moth of the family Crambidae described by Achille Guenée in 1854. It can be found in western, southern and eastern Africa, from Ghana to South Africa and some islands of the Indian Ocean as well as in Australasia, Australia and India.

Known host plants of N. geometralis are Oleaceae species, especially in the genus Jasminum.
