= Chabulina tenera =

Scientific classification
- Kingdom: Animalia
- Phylum: Arthropoda
- Clade: Pancrustacea
- Class: Insecta
- Order: Lepidoptera
- Family: Crambidae
- Genus: Chabulina
- Species: C. tenera

Binomial name
- Chabulina tenera (Butler, 1883)

Synonyms
- Hydrocampa tenera Butler, 1883; Diastictis tenera (Butler, 1883)

Species of moth

Chabulina tenera is a species of moth in the family Crambidae. It was described by Arthur Gardiner Butler in 1883. It is found on Sulawesi.
