= Hileithia nacobora =

Scientific classification
- Kingdom: Animalia
- Phylum: Arthropoda
- Class: Insecta
- Order: Lepidoptera
- Family: Crambidae
- Genus: Hileithia
- Species: H. nacobora

Binomial name
- Hileithia nacobora (Dyar, 1914)

Synonyms
- Bocchoris nacobora Dyar, 1914

Species of moth

Hileithia nacobora is a species of moth in the family Crambidae. It was described by Harrison Gray Dyar Jr. in 1914. It is found in Panama.

== Description ==
The wingspan is about 14 mm. The wings are white, tinged with creamy and with small costal dots. The lines are slender and blackish. There is a dusky shade between the inner and outer lines of the hindwings.
