= Hileithia rhehabalis =

Scientific classification
- Kingdom: Animalia
- Phylum: Arthropoda
- Class: Insecta
- Order: Lepidoptera
- Family: Crambidae
- Genus: Hileithia
- Species: H. rhehabalis

Binomial name
- Hileithia rhehabalis (Dyar, 1914)

Synonyms
- Bocchoris rhehabalis Dyar, 1914

Species of moth

Hileithia rhehabalis is a species of moth in the family Crambidae. It was described by Harrison Gray Dyar Jr. in 1914. It is found in Panama.

The wingspan is about 13 mm. The forewings are white with a slender and faint inner line on the forewings.
