= Diastictis incisalis =

Scientific classification
- Kingdom: Animalia
- Phylum: Arthropoda
- Class: Insecta
- Order: Lepidoptera
- Family: Crambidae
- Genus: Diastictis
- Species: D. incisalis

Binomial name
- Diastictis incisalis (Snellen, 1880)

Synonyms
- Botys incisalis Snellen, 1880

Species of moth

Diastictis incisalis is a moth in the family Crambidae. It was described by Snellen in 1880. It is found on Sulawesi.
