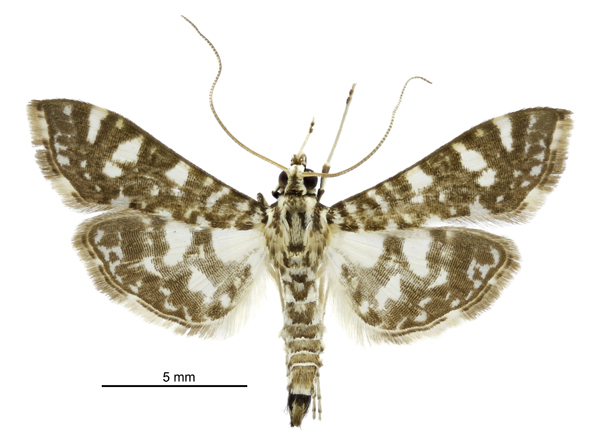
- Male
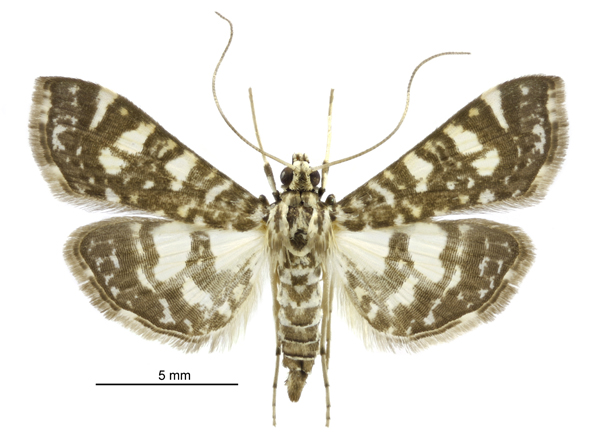
- Female

Scientific classification
- Kingdom: Animalia
- Phylum: Arthropoda
- Class: Insecta
- Order: Lepidoptera
- Family: Crambidae
- Genus: Chabulina
- Species: C. onychinalis

Binomial name
- Chabulina onychinalis (Guenée, 1854)

Synonyms
- Asopia onychinalis Guenée, 1854; Zebronia braurealis Walker, 1859

= Chabulina onychinalis =

Species of moth

Chabulina onychinalis, also known as the swan flower plant moth and until recently called Glyphodes onychinalis, is a moth of the family Crambidae. It is native to the Afro-Asian Region, including India, Sri Lanka, Hong Kong, Thailand, Indonesia, Japan, Australia (the Northern Territory and Queensland) and New Zealand, and has been recorded in California since 2000.

== Taxonomy ==
The taxonomy of this species was studied in 2022 and placed in the genus Chabulina.

== Description ==
The wingspan is about 15 mm (0.59 in).

== Hosts ==
The larvae have been recorded feeding on jasmine, Nerium oleander, Gomphocarpus fruticosus and probably also feed on other plants.
