= Chabulina nuclealis =

Scientific classification
- Kingdom: Animalia
- Phylum: Arthropoda
- Class: Insecta
- Order: Lepidoptera
- Family: Crambidae
- Genus: Chabulina
- Species: C. nuclealis

Binomial name
- Chabulina nuclealis (de Joannis, 1927)

Species of moth

Chabulina nuclealis is a moth in the family Crambidae. It was described by Joseph de Joannis in 1927. It is found in Mozambique.
