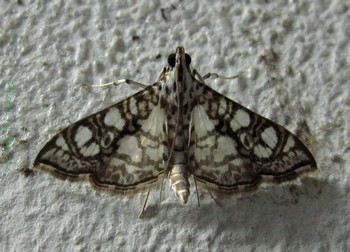

Scientific classification
- Domain: Eukaryota
- Kingdom: Animalia
- Phylum: Arthropoda
- Class: Insecta
- Order: Lepidoptera
- Family: Crambidae
- Genus: Nausinoe
- Species: N. gueyraudi

Binomial name
- Nausinoe gueyraudi Guillermet, 2003

Synonyms
- Bocchoris gueyraudi

= Nausinoe gueyraudi =

Species of moth

Nausinoe gueyraudi is a moth of the family Crambidae. It is endemic to La Réunion.
