= Chabulina labarinthalis =

Scientific classification
- Kingdom: Animalia
- Phylum: Arthropoda
- Class: Insecta
- Order: Lepidoptera
- Family: Crambidae
- Genus: Chabulina
- Species: C. labarinthalis

Binomial name
- Chabulina labarinthalis (Hampson, 1912)

Species of moth

Chabulina labarinthalis is a moth of the family Crambidae. It can be found in Nigeria. It has a wingspan of 20 mm (0.79 in).
