= Chabulina albinalis =

Scientific classification
- Kingdom: Animalia
- Phylum: Arthropoda
- Class: Insecta
- Order: Lepidoptera
- Family: Crambidae
- Genus: Chabulina
- Species: C. albinalis

Binomial name
- Chabulina albinalis (Hampson, 1912)

Synonyms
- Bocchoris albinalis

Species of moth

Chabulina albinalis is a moth in the family Crambidae. It was described by George Hampson in 1912. It is found in Oman and India.
