= Nausinoella =

Scientific classification
- Kingdom: Animalia
- Phylum: Arthropoda
- Class: Insecta
- Order: Lepidoptera
- Family: Crambidae
- Subfamily: Spilomelinae
- Genus: Nausinoella; J. C. Shaffer & Munroe, 2007
- Species: N. aphrospila

Binomial name
- Nausinoella aphrospila (Meyrick, 1936)

Synonyms
- Nausinoe aphrospila Meyrick, 1936

Genus of moths

Nausinoella is a genus of moths of the family Crambidae. It contains only one species, Nausinoella aphrospila, which is found on the Comoros and Seychelles (Aldabra), as well as in the Democratic Republic of Congo, Rwanda and Zimbabwe.
