= Hileithia hohaelis =

Scientific classification
- Kingdom: Animalia
- Phylum: Arthropoda
- Class: Insecta
- Order: Lepidoptera
- Family: Crambidae
- Genus: Hileithia
- Species: H. hohaelis

Binomial name
- Hileithia hohaelis (Dyar, 1914)

Synonyms
- Bocchoris hohaelis Dyar, 1914

Species of moth

Hileithia hohaelis is a species of moth in the family Crambidae. It was described by Harrison Gray Dyar Jr. in 1914. It is found in Panama.

The wingspan is about 11 mm. The forewings are nearly white with some costal dots.
