= Chabulina amphipeda =

Scientific classification
- Kingdom: Animalia
- Phylum: Arthropoda
- Class: Insecta
- Order: Lepidoptera
- Family: Crambidae
- Genus: Chabulina
- Species: C. amphipeda

Binomial name
- Chabulina amphipeda (Meyrick, 1939)

Synonyms
- Margaronia amphipeda Meyrick, 1939; Glyphodes cadeti Guillermet in Viette & Guillermet, 1996

Species of moth

Chabulina amphipeda is a moth in the family Crambidae. It was described by Edward Meyrick in 1939. It is found in Namibia.
