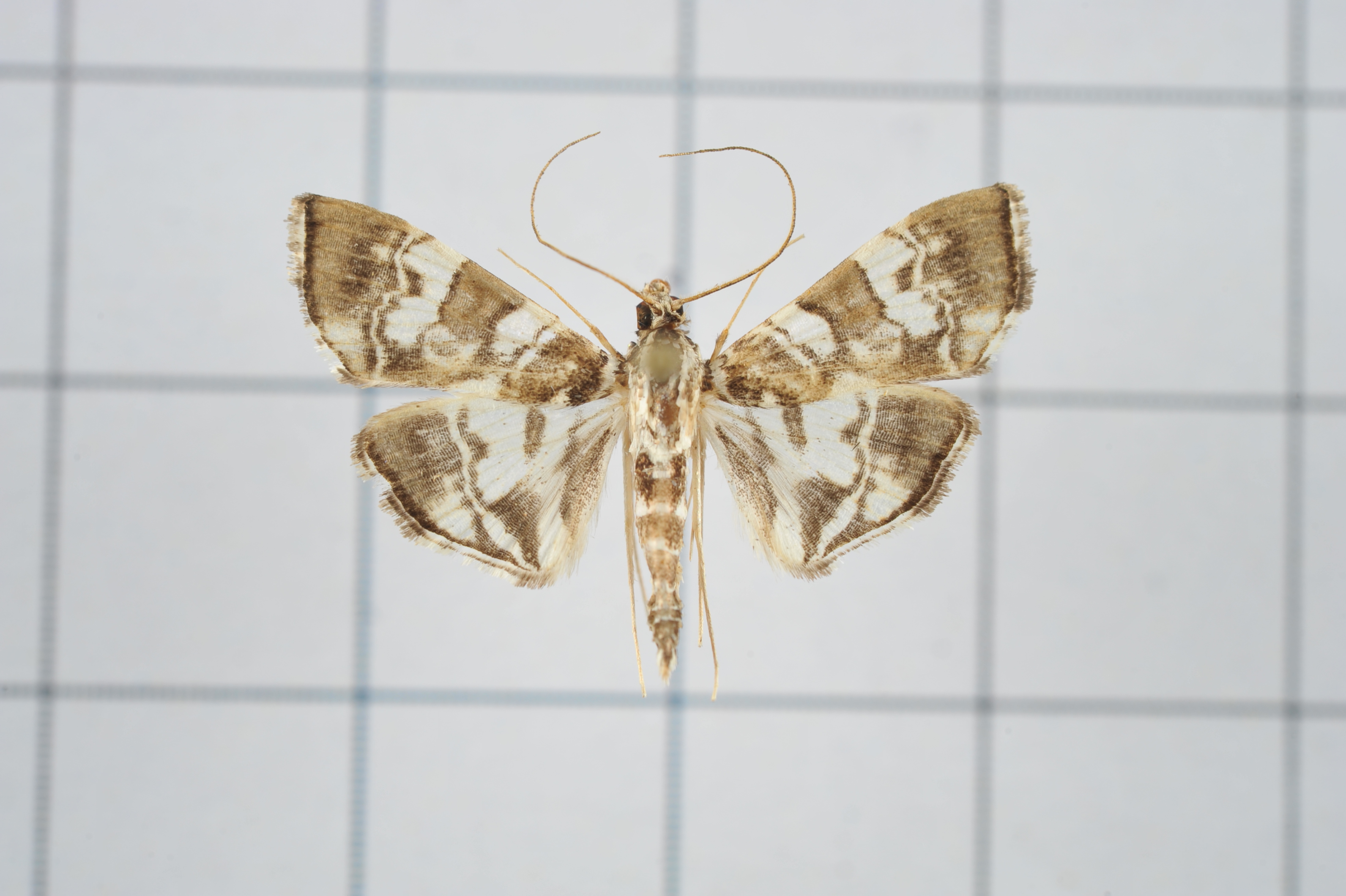

Scientific classification
- Kingdom: Animalia
- Phylum: Arthropoda
- Class: Insecta
- Order: Lepidoptera
- Family: Crambidae
- Subfamily: Spilomelinae
- Genus: Chabula
- Species: C. acamasalis

Binomial name
- Chabula acamasalis (Walker, 1859)

Synonyms
- Bocchoris acamasalisWalker, 1859; Zebronia acamasalis Walker, 1859; Botys flexissimalis Walker, 1866; Heterocnephes strangulalis Snellen, 1880; Zebronia perspiculalis Walker, 1866

= Chabula acamasalis =

Species of moth

Chabula acamasalis is a moth of the family Crambidae. It is found in India, Burma, Sri Lanka, Hong Kong, Indonesia, Taiwan, Japan and much of Australia.

The wingspan is about 20 mm. The wings are dark brown with a pattern of white patches.
