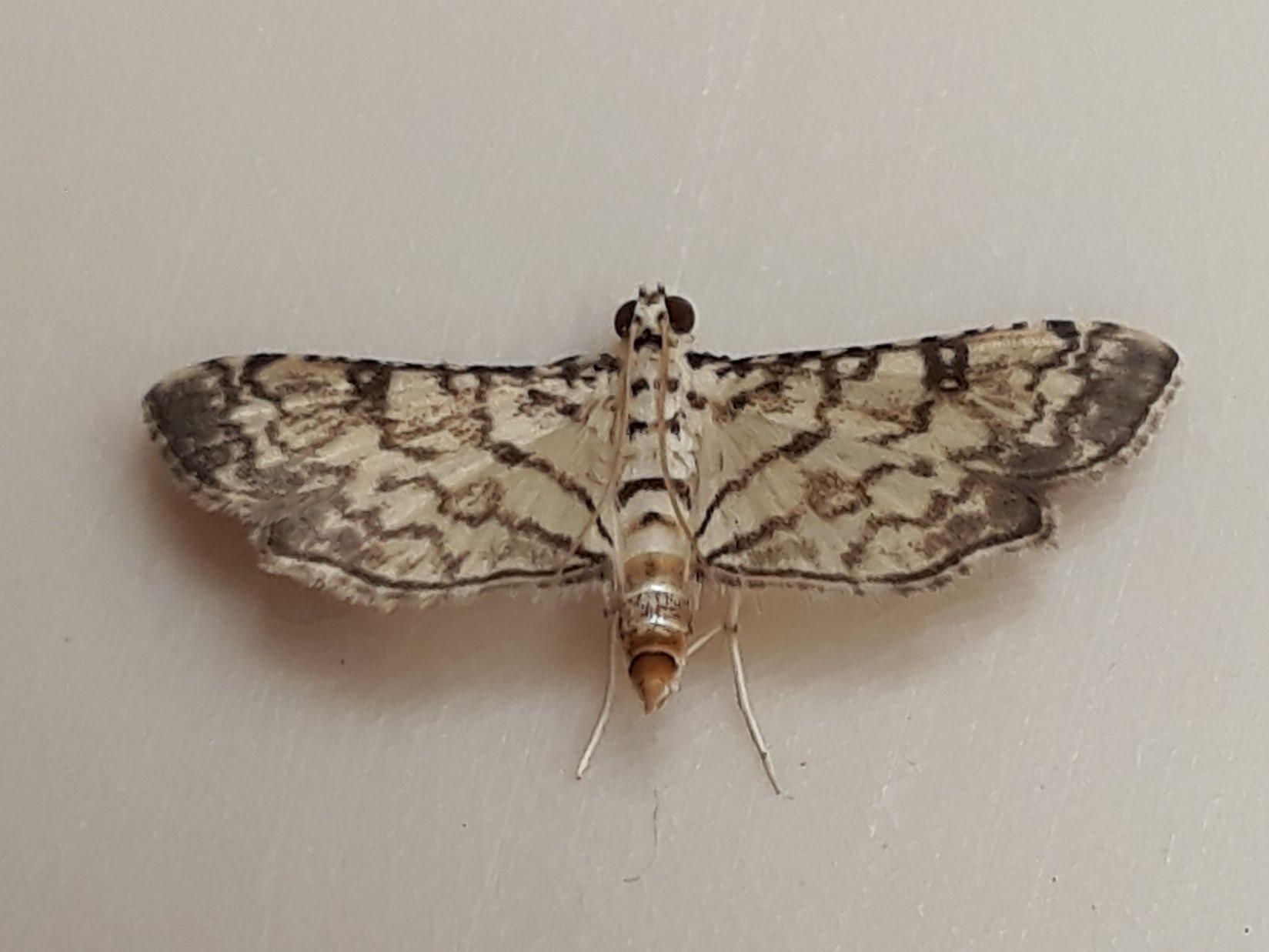

Scientific classification
- Kingdom: Animalia
- Phylum: Arthropoda
- Class: Insecta
- Order: Lepidoptera
- Family: Crambidae
- Genus: Hileithia
- Species: H. approprialis

Binomial name
- Hileithia approprialis (Dyar, 1914)

Synonyms
- Bocchoris approprialis Dyar, 1914

= Hileithia approprialis =

Species of moth

Hileithia approprialis is a species of moth in the family Crambidae. It was first described by Harrison Gray Dyar Jr. in 1914. It is found in Panama.

== Description ==
The wingspan is 13–14 mm. The wings are pale straw yellow with dense costal dots on the forewings. The ground colour is shaded with brown along the margins of both wings.
