= Hileithia invidiosa =

Scientific classification
- Kingdom: Animalia
- Phylum: Arthropoda
- Class: Insecta
- Order: Lepidoptera
- Family: Crambidae
- Genus: Hileithia
- Species: H. invidiosa

Binomial name
- Hileithia invidiosa (Dyar, 1914)

Synonyms
- Bocchoris invidiosa Dyar, 1914

Species of moth

Hileithia invidiosa is a species of moth in the family Crambidae. It was described by Harrison Gray Dyar Jr. in 1914. It is found in Panama.

== Description ==
The wingspan is about 18 mm. The wings are whitish, slightly tinged with straw. There is a brown marginal shade.
