= Hileithia densalis =

Scientific classification
- Kingdom: Animalia
- Phylum: Arthropoda
- Class: Insecta
- Order: Lepidoptera
- Family: Crambidae
- Genus: Hileithia
- Species: H. densalis

Binomial name
- Hileithia densalis (Dyar, 1914)

Synonyms
- Bocchoris densalis Dyar, 1914

Species of moth

Hileithia densalis is a species of moth in the family Crambidae. It was described by Harrison Gray Dyar Jr. in 1914. It is found in Panama.

== Description ==
The wingspan is about 11 mm. The forewings are pale straw yellow, shaded with ochreous brown beyond the discal mark. The ground colour is irrorated (sprinkled) with patches of dark brown shading.
