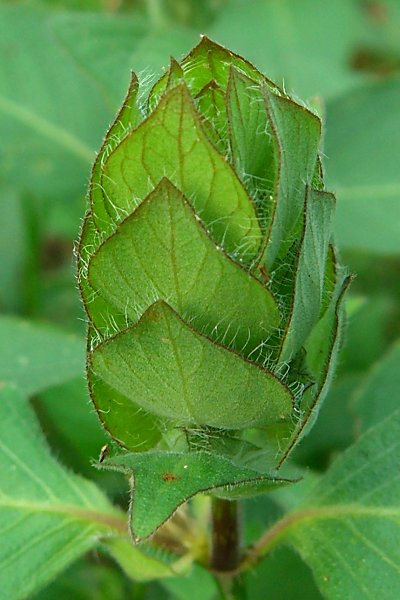
- Close-up
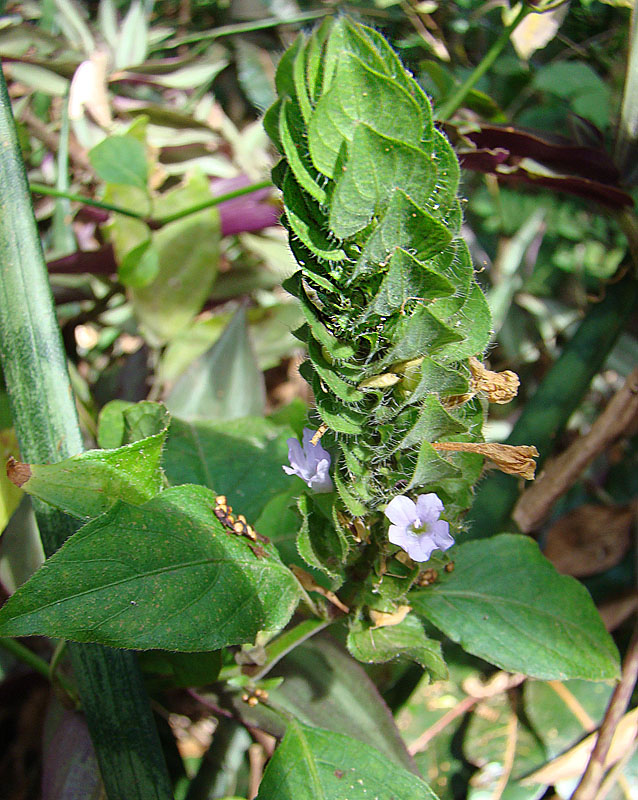
- Habit

Scientific classification
- Kingdom: Plantae
- Clade: Tracheophytes
- Clade: Angiosperms
- Clade: Eudicots
- Clade: Asterids
- Order: Lamiales
- Family: Acanthaceae
- Genus: Ruellia
- Species: R. blechum

Binomial name
- Ruellia blechum L.

Synonyms
- List: Alvarezia parviflora Pav. ex Nees; Barleria pyramidalis Lam. ex Nees; Barleria pyramidata Lam.; Blechum blechum (L.) Millsp.; Blechum brownei Juss.; Blechum brownei Kunth; Blechum brownei f. albiflora Kuntze; Blechum brownei f. coeruleum Kuntze; Blechum brownei var. laxum Nees; Blechum brownei f. puberulum Leonard; Blechum brownei var. subcordatum Kuntze; Blechum haenkei Nees; Blechum linnaei Nees; Blechum linnaei var. laxum Nees; Blechum linnaei var. nanum Nees; Blechum linnaei var. parviflora Nees; Blechum linnaei var. parviflorum Nees; Blechum luzonium Nees; Blechum pyramidatum (Lam.) Urb.; Blechum trinitense Nees; Dianthera eustachiana Hook. ex Nees; Justicia carthagenensis Willd. ex Nees; Justicia carthaginensis Nees & Mart.; Justicia lupulina Lam.; Justicia martinicensis Sieber ex Nees; Ruellia bracteata Vahl ex Nees; Ruellia gairae Rohr ex Nees; Ruellia parviflora Sessé & Moc.; Ruellia rohrii Vahl ex Nees; Ruellia uliginosa Blanco

= Ruellia blechum =

Species of plant

Ruellia blechum, the green shrimp plant or Browne's blechum, is a species of flowering plant in the family Acanthaceae. It is native to Mexico, the Caribbean, and northern and western South America, and has been introduced to Brazil, Taiwan, many Pacific islands, and the US states of Hawaii, Louisiana and Florida. Its popularity as an ornamental has led to it becoming invasive in places as far flung as Papua New Guinea.
