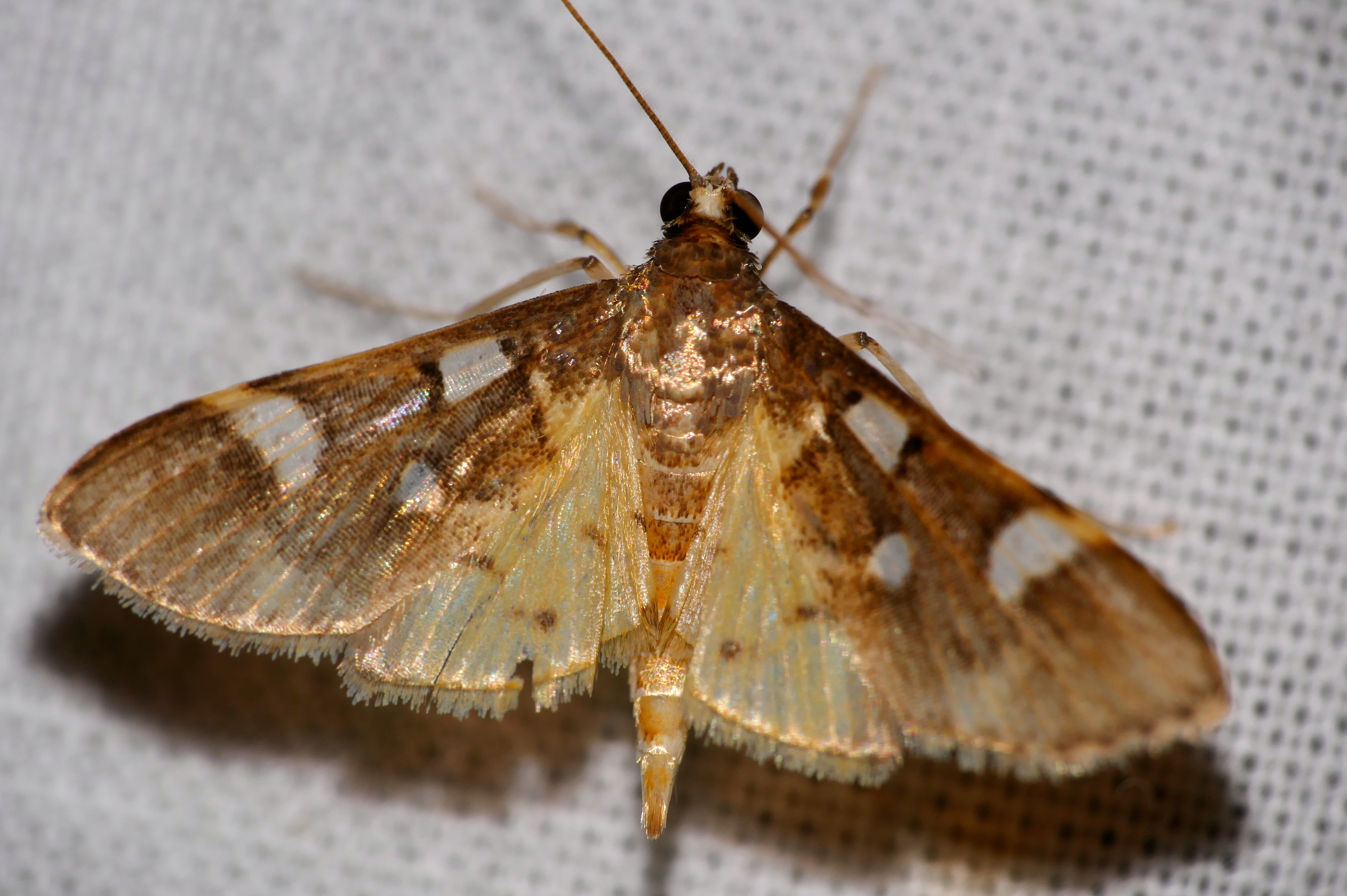

Scientific classification
- Domain: Eukaryota
- Kingdom: Animalia
- Phylum: Arthropoda
- Class: Insecta
- Order: Lepidoptera
- Family: Crambidae
- Subfamily: Spilomelinae
- Genus: Cotachena; Moore, 1885

Synonyms
- Mesothyris Warren, 1892; Syndicastis Meyrick, 1889; Prophantis Warren, 1896 (disputed)

= Cotachena =

Genus of moths

Cotachena is a genus of moths of the family Crambidae.

== Species ==
- Cotachena aluensis Butler, 1887
- Cotachena alysoni Whalley, 1961
- Cotachena brunnealis Yamanaka, 2001
- Cotachena fuscimarginalis Hampson, 1916
- Cotachena heteromima Meyrick, 1889
- Cotachena hicana (Turner, 1915)
- Cotachena histricalis (Walker, 1859)
- Cotachena nepalensis Yamanaka, 2000
- Cotachena pubescens Warren, 1892
- Cotachena taiwanalis Yamanaka, 2001

== Former species ==
- Cotachena octoguttalis (Felder & Rogenhofer, 1875)
- Cotachena smaragdina (Butler, 1875)
