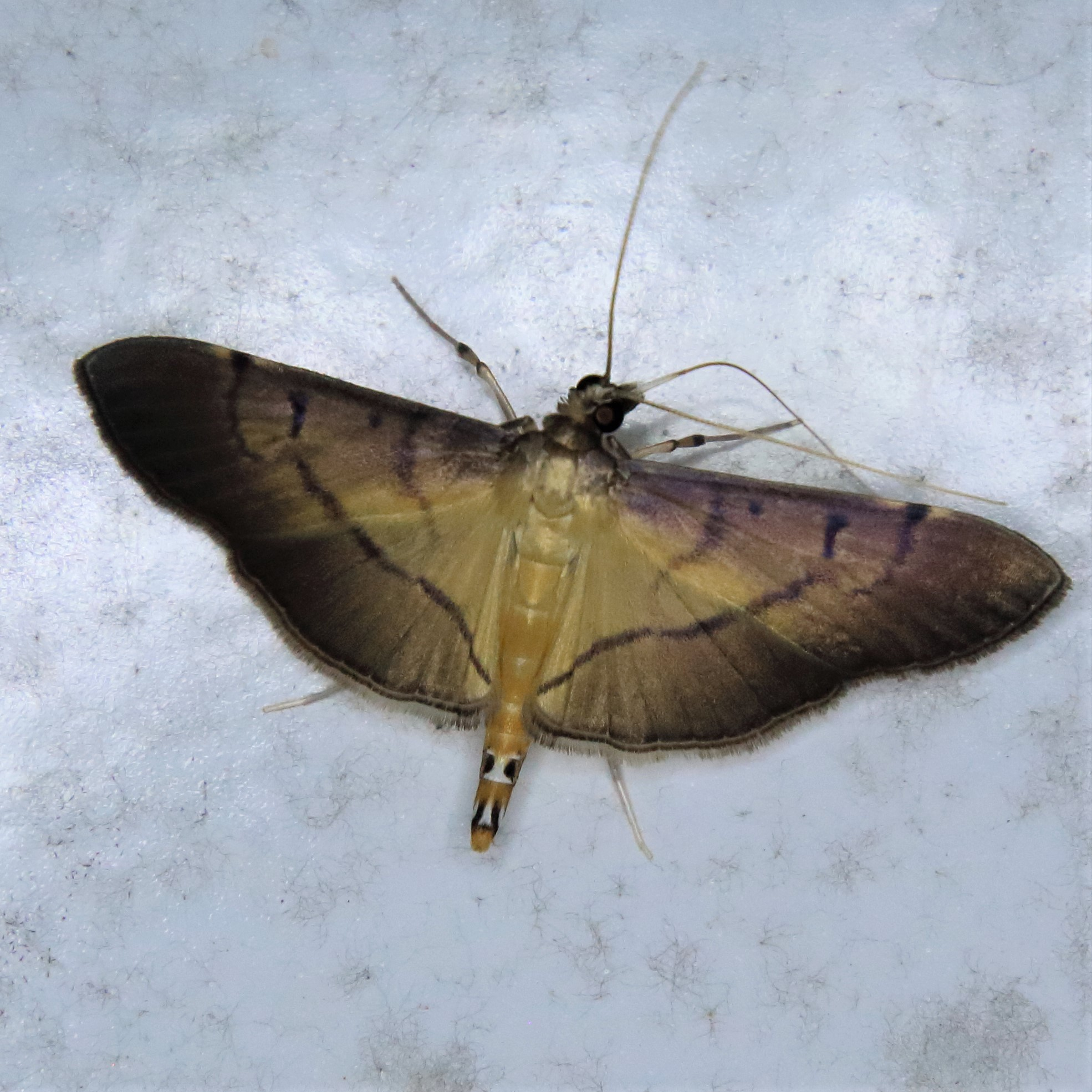

Scientific classification
- Kingdom: Animalia
- Phylum: Arthropoda
- Clade: Pancrustacea
- Class: Insecta
- Order: Lepidoptera
- Family: Crambidae
- Subfamily: Spilomelinae
- Genus: Bacotoma; Moore, 1885

Synonyms
- Platamonia Lederer, 1863; Platamonina J. C. Shaffer & Munroe, 2007

= Bacotoma =

Genus of moths

Bacotoma is a genus of moths in the subfamily Spilomelinae of the family Crambidae. It currently comprises 11 species, with an Oriental and Australasian distribution ranging from India and Sri Lanka over China and Southeast Asia to Australia.

== Description ==
The adults of Bacotoma have relatively narrow forewings and broad, almost triangular hindwings. Wing coloration is inconspicuous, with shades of brown and beige dominating. On the forewing, the antemedian and postmedian lines as well as the proximal and especially the distal discoidal stigma are distinct; on the hindwing, the postmedian line is prominent, and sometimes the discoidal stigma is well developed. Males have a long and slender abdomen with often prominent anal tufts and conspicuous patterns of black and white marks on the abdominal tergites 7 and 8, in some species also on tergite 6. The male genitalia are characterized by oval to lanceolate valvae with complex sclerotisations of the fibula and sacculus. The uncus exhibits two long, slender, apically tapering or somewhat inflated arms. The phallus or aedeagus is simple, sclerotized and contains a single needle-like cornutus. The female genitalia consist of a simple, sac-like corpus bursae with one or two small signa, a slender ductus bursae with granular texture and a small, sclerotized antrum. Characteristic for the genus are the pleural pockets of sternum 7, which are densely covered in short microtrichia. The pre-imaginal stages of Bacotoma have not been described.

== Diagnosis ==
Imagines of Bacotoma are superficially similar to those of Bradina, Herpetogramma and Syngamia, with which they share similar coloration and maculation. Identification of the adults and distinction from externally similar species is possible through genetical sequences, e.g. DNA barcoding, or genitalia dissection. In the genitalia, the genus is characterized by a number of putatively apomorphic features: in the male genitalia, the strongly bifurcate juxta with slender arms, each apically ending in a small hook, and the broad, lobate transtilla arms protruding dorsad beyond the costal valva edge; in the female genitalia, the pleural membrane of sternum 7 exhibits deep pockets covered in microtrichia.

== Biology ==
Larvae of Bacotoma illatalis and B. ampliatalis have been reared from Celtis philippensis (Cannabaceae) and Strychnos minor (Loganiaceae) in Papua New Guinea.

== Species ==
- Bacotoma abjungalis (Walker, 1859)
- Bacotoma ampliatalis (Lederer, 1863)
- Bacotoma binotalis (Warren, 1896)
- Bacotoma camillusalis (Walker, 1859)
- Bacotoma cuprealis (Moore, 1877)
- Bacotoma hainanensis Yang, Ullah, Landry, Miller, Rosati & Zhang, 2019
- Bacotoma illatalis (Walker, 1866)
- Bacotoma oggalis (Swinhoe, 1906)
- Bacotoma poecilura (E. Hering, 1903)
- Bacotoma ptochura (Meyrick, 1894)
- Bacotoma violata (Fabricius, 1787)
