= C. nepalensis =

C. nepalensis may refer to:

- Callistomimus nepalensis, a ground beetle
- Calocheiridius nepalensis, a book scorpion
- Canna nepalensis, a perennial plant
- Cardamine nepalensis, a mustard flower
- Chamaerops nepalensis, an Asian plant
- Cheiroseius nepalensis, a mite with a single pair of spiracles positioned laterally on the body
- Chlaenius nepalensis, a ground beetle
- Chorthippus nepalensis, an acridid grasshopper
- Cissampelos nepalensis, a flowering plant
- Codonopsis nepalensis, a plant endemic to East Asia
- Cordyceps nepalensis, a sac fungus
- Coriaria nepalensis, a shrub with yellow flowers
- Cotachena nepalensis, a grass moth
- Cotoneaster nepalensis, a plant native to the Palaearctic region
- Craspedophorus nepalensis, a ground beetle
- Cupressus nepalensis, a southern Asian cypress
- Cyananthus nepalensis, a Himalayan herb
- Cychropsis nepalensis, a ground beetle
- Cyrtodactylus nepalensis, a bent-toed gecko
