= Platamonina =

Scientific classification
- Domain: Eukaryota
- Kingdom: Animalia
- Phylum: Arthropoda
- Class: Insecta
- Order: Lepidoptera
- Family: Crambidae
- Subfamily: Spilomelinae
- Genus: Platamonina; J. C. Shaffer & Munroe, 2007

Synonyms
- Platamonia Lederer, 1863

Genus of moths

Platamonina is a genus of moths of the family Crambidae.

== Species ==
- Platamonina ampliatalis (Lederer, 1863)
- Platamonina poecilura (E. Hering, 1903)
- Platamonina ptochura (Meyrick, 1894)
