= Cotachena alysoni =

Scientific classification
- Kingdom: Animalia
- Phylum: Arthropoda
- Class: Insecta
- Order: Lepidoptera
- Family: Crambidae
- Subfamily: Spilomelinae
- Genus: Cotachena
- Species: C. alysoni

Binomial name
- Cotachena alysoni Whalley, 1961

Species of moth

Cotachena alysoni is a moth in the family Crambidae. It was described by Paul E.S. Whalley in 1961. It is found in China.
