= G. nepalensis =

G. nepalensis may refer to:

- Gerbera nepalensis, an ornamental plant
- Gonepteryx nepalensis, an Old World butterfly
- Gonydactylus nepalensis, a bent-toed gecko
- Gunvorita nepalensis, a ground beetle
- Gynura nepalensis, an Asian plant
