= Agrionympha jansella =

Scientific classification
- Domain: Eukaryota
- Kingdom: Animalia
- Phylum: Arthropoda
- Class: Insecta
- Order: Lepidoptera
- Family: Micropterigidae
- Genus: Agrionympha
- Species: A. jansella

Binomial name
- Agrionympha jansella Gibbs, 2011

Moth species in family Micropterigidae

Agrionympha jansella is a species of moth belonging to the family Micropterigidae. It was described by George W. Gibbs and Niels P. Kristensen in 2011. It is found in South Africa, where it is known only from Karkloof Falls in the Eastern Cape.

The length of the forewings is about 3.2 mm for females.

== Etymology ==
The species is named in honour of Anthonie Johannes Theodorus Janse, who revealed the presence of micropterigids in southern Africa when he collected Agrionympha pseliacma at the same locality as A. jansella (Karkloof Falls) in 1917.
