= Bapara paynei =

Scientific classification
- Domain: Eukaryota
- Kingdom: Animalia
- Phylum: Arthropoda
- Class: Insecta
- Order: Lepidoptera
- Family: Pyralidae
- Genus: Bapara
- Species: B. paynei

Binomial name
- Bapara paynei Whalley, 1964

Species of moth

Bapara paynei is a species of snout moth in the genus Bapara. It was described by Paul E.S. Whalley in 1964, and is known from New Guinea.
