= Agrioglypta proximalis =

Scientific classification
- Kingdom: Animalia
- Phylum: Arthropoda
- Clade: Pancrustacea
- Class: Insecta
- Order: Lepidoptera
- Family: Crambidae
- Genus: Agrioglypta
- Species: A. proximalis

Binomial name
- Agrioglypta proximalis Whalley, 1962

Synonyms
- Margaronia proximalis Whalley, 1962

Species of moth

Agrioglypta proximalis is a moth in the family Crambidae. It is found on the Solomon Islands, where it was recorded on Rennell Island.
