= Agrionympha capensis =

Scientific classification
- Domain: Eukaryota
- Kingdom: Animalia
- Phylum: Arthropoda
- Class: Insecta
- Order: Lepidoptera
- Family: Micropterigidae
- Genus: Agrionympha
- Species: A. capensis

Binomial name
- Agrionympha capensis Whalley, 1978

Moth species in family Micropterigidae

Agrionympha capensis is a species of moth belonging to the family Micropterigidae. It was described by Paul Whalley in 1978. It is known from South Africa, where it is found in the Western and Eastern Cape districts.

The length of the forewings is 2.6–3 mm for males and 2.9–3.4 mm for females.

Adults have been found on low macchia (or fynbos) vegetation in the Cape area.
