= Agrionympha pseudovari =

Scientific classification
- Domain: Eukaryota
- Kingdom: Animalia
- Phylum: Arthropoda
- Class: Insecta
- Order: Lepidoptera
- Family: Micropterigidae
- Genus: Agrionympha
- Species: A. pseudovari

Binomial name
- Agrionympha pseudovari Gibbs, 2011

Moth species in family Micropterigidae

Agrionympha pseudovari is a species of moth belonging to the family Micropterigidae. It was described by George W. Gibbs and Niels P. Kristensen in 2011. It is found in South Africa, where it is known only from the Western Cape.

Its habitat consists of a deep sandstone kloof where damp seepage has permitted growth of liverworts.

The length of the forewings is about 3.5 mm for females.

== Etymology ==
The specific name conveys the superficial similarity of this species to Agrionympha vari.
