= Aethaloessa rufula =

Scientific classification
- Kingdom: Animalia
- Phylum: Arthropoda
- Clade: Pancrustacea
- Class: Insecta
- Order: Lepidoptera
- Family: Crambidae
- Subfamily: Spilomelinae
- Genus: Aethaloessa
- Species: A. rufula

Binomial name
- Aethaloessa rufula Whalley, 1961

Species of moth

Aethaloessa rufula is a moth in the family Crambidae. It was described by Paul Whalley in 1961. It is found on the Solomon Islands.
