= Agrioglypta malayana =

Scientific classification
- Kingdom: Animalia
- Phylum: Arthropoda
- Clade: Pancrustacea
- Class: Insecta
- Order: Lepidoptera
- Family: Crambidae
- Genus: Agrioglypta
- Species: A. malayana

Binomial name
- Agrioglypta malayana (Butler, 1881)

Synonyms
- Glyphodes malayana Butler, 1881

Species of moth

Agrioglypta malayana is a moth in the family Crambidae. It is found in Taiwan.
