= Bacotoma illatalis =

Scientific classification
- Domain: Eukaryota
- Kingdom: Animalia
- Phylum: Arthropoda
- Class: Insecta
- Order: Lepidoptera
- Family: Crambidae
- Subfamily: Spilomelinae
- Genus: Bacotoma
- Species: B. illatalis

Binomial name
- Bacotoma illatalis (Walker, 1866)

Synonyms
- Botys illatalis Walker, 1866

Species of moth

Bacotoma illatalis is a moth in the family Crambidae. It was described by Francis Walker in 1866. It is found on the Sula Islands in Indonesia.
