= Syngamia albiceps =

Scientific classification
- Kingdom: Animalia
- Phylum: Arthropoda
- Class: Insecta
- Order: Lepidoptera
- Family: Crambidae
- Genus: Syngamia
- Species: S. albiceps

Binomial name
- Syngamia albiceps Hampson, 1912

Species of moth

Syngamia albiceps is a moth in the family Crambidae. It was described by George Hampson in 1912. It is found in Singapore.

The wingspan is about 22 mm. The forewings are cupreous brown, the inner half pale yellow from before the antemedial line to the postmedial line confluent with a patch beyond the lower angle of the cell. There is a curved blackish antemedial line, a slight black discoidal lunule with a small white spot before it and a blackish postmedial line, defined on the outer side by white towards the costa, where it expands into a small spot with some white before and beyond it. It is minutely waved, at vein 2 retracted to below the end of the cell and then slightly angled outwards in the submedian fold. The hindwings are pale yellow, the terminal area broadly tinged with cupreous brown and with a blackish discoidal striga. The postmedial line is blackish, bent inwards at vein 2 to below the end of the cell and then oblique to the inner margin.
