= Syngamia canarialis =

Scientific classification
- Kingdom: Animalia
- Phylum: Arthropoda
- Class: Insecta
- Order: Lepidoptera
- Family: Crambidae
- Genus: Syngamia
- Species: S. canarialis

Binomial name
- Syngamia canarialis (Snellen, 1899)

Synonyms
- Botys canarialis Snellen, 1899

Species of moth

Syngamia canarialis is a moth in the family Crambidae. It was described by Snellen in 1899. It is found in Indonesia (Java).
