= Bapara obliterosa =

Scientific classification
- Kingdom: Animalia
- Phylum: Arthropoda
- Class: Insecta
- Order: Lepidoptera
- Family: Pyralidae
- Genus: Bapara
- Species: B. obliterosa

Binomial name
- Bapara obliterosa Walker, 1865

Species of moth

Bapara obliterosa is a species of snout moth in the genus Bapara. It was described by Francis Walker in 1865 and is known from New Guinea and the D'Entrecasteaux Islands.

Males are dull grass green above and cinereous beneath. The forewings have four very irregular reddish-brown bands and a diffuse cluster of white speckles in the exterior disk, intersected by two short transverse black streaks, which represent the reniform (kidney-shaped) mark. The marginal line is brown and interrupted. The hindwings are cinereous.
