= Prophantis octoguttalis =

Scientific classification
- Domain: Eukaryota
- Kingdom: Animalia
- Phylum: Arthropoda
- Class: Insecta
- Order: Lepidoptera
- Family: Crambidae
- Genus: Prophantis
- Species: P. octoguttalis

Binomial name
- Prophantis octoguttalis (C. Felder, R. Felder & Rogenhofer, 1875)

Synonyms
- Botys octoguttalis Felder & Rogenhofer, 1875; Cotachena octoguttalis; Botys coffealis Bordage, 1897; Botys stenopalis Mabille, 1880

Species of moth

Prophantis octoguttalis is a species of moth of the family Crambidae. The species was described by Baron Cajetan von Felder, Rudolf Felder and Alois Friedrich Rogenhofer in 1875. It is found on the Maluku Islands in Indonesia.

Identifications from Comoros, Madagascar and South Africa are possibly misidentifications that could be attributed to Prophantis smaragdina.
