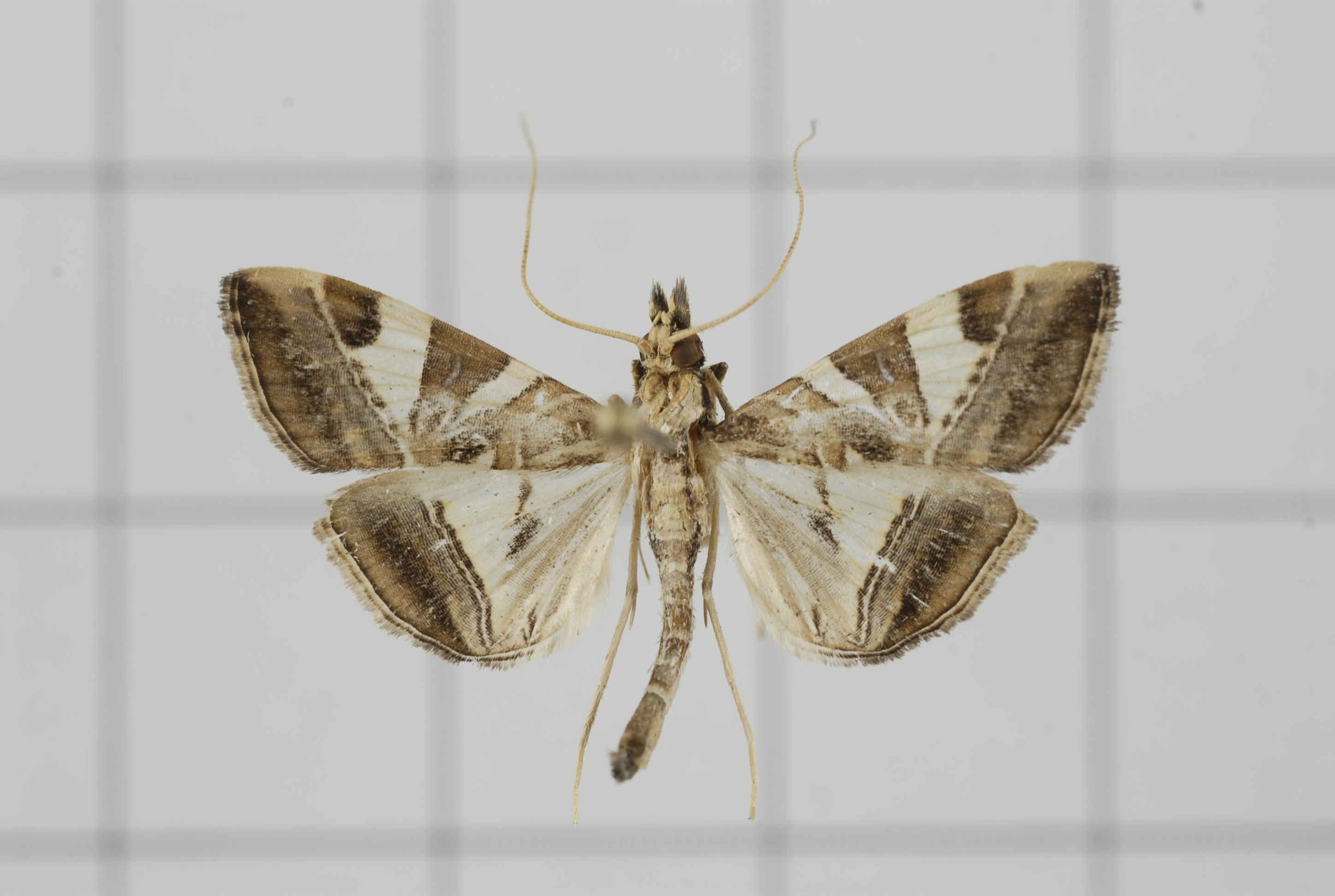

Scientific classification
- Kingdom: Animalia
- Phylum: Arthropoda
- Clade: Pancrustacea
- Class: Insecta
- Order: Lepidoptera
- Family: Crambidae
- Genus: Agrioglypta
- Species: A. itysalis

Binomial name
- Agrioglypta itysalis Walker, 1859

Synonyms
- Glyphodes itysalis Walker, 1859; Glyphodes piepersialis Snellen, 1880

= Agrioglypta itysalis =

Species of moth

Agrioglypta itysalis is a moth of the family Crambidae. It is found in Asia, including Myanmar, India and Borneo.

The wingspan is about 30 mm. The forewings are brown with white patches and the hindwings are white with a broad brown margin. It looks similar to Glyphodes bivitralis.
