= Syngamia luteofusalis =

Scientific classification
- Kingdom: Animalia
- Phylum: Arthropoda
- Class: Insecta
- Order: Lepidoptera
- Family: Crambidae
- Genus: Syngamia
- Species: S. luteofusalis

Binomial name
- Syngamia luteofusalis (Mabille, 1900)

Synonyms
- Bocchoris luteofusalis

Species of moth

Syngamia luteofusalis is a moth of the family Crambidae. It can be found in Madagascar.
