= Syngamia glebosalis =

Scientific classification
- Kingdom: Animalia
- Phylum: Arthropoda
- Class: Insecta
- Order: Lepidoptera
- Family: Crambidae
- Genus: Syngamia
- Species: S. glebosalis

Binomial name
- Syngamia glebosalis Viette, 1960

Species of moth

Syngamia glebosalis is a moth in the family Crambidae. It was described by Viette in 1960. It is found in Madagascar.
