= Cotachena heteromima =

Scientific classification
- Domain: Eukaryota
- Kingdom: Animalia
- Phylum: Arthropoda
- Class: Insecta
- Order: Lepidoptera
- Family: Crambidae
- Subfamily: Spilomelinae
- Genus: Cotachena
- Species: C. heteromima

Binomial name
- Cotachena heteromima (Meyrick, 1889)

Synonyms
- Syndicastis heteromima Meyrick, 1889; Cotachena fulvomarginalis Pagenstecher, 1900

Species of moth

Cotachena heteromima is a moth in the family Crambidae. It was described by Edward Meyrick in 1889. It is found on New Guinea.
