= Syngamia binotalis =

Scientific classification
- Kingdom: Animalia
- Phylum: Arthropoda
- Class: Insecta
- Order: Lepidoptera
- Family: Crambidae
- Genus: Syngamia
- Species: S. binotalis

Binomial name
- Syngamia binotalis (Warren, 1896)

Synonyms
- Platamonia binotalis Warren, 1896

Species of moth

Syngamia binotalis is a moth in the family Crambidae. It was described by Warren in 1896. It is found in Burma.
