= Triclisia macrophylla =

Conservation status
- Critically Endangered (IUCN 3.1)

Scientific classification
- Kingdom: Plantae
- Clade: Tracheophytes
- Clade: Angiosperms
- Clade: Eudicots
- Order: Ranunculales
- Family: Menispermaceae
- Genus: Triclisia
- Species: T. macrophylla

Binomial name
- Triclisia macrophylla Oliv.

Species of flowering plant

Triclisia macrophylla is a species of plant in the family Menispermaceae. It is a climbing shrub producing stems 10 - 20 meters long. It is native to Cameroon, the island of Bioko in Equatorial Guinea, and Sierra Leone. Its natural habitats are subtropical or tropical moist lowland forest and subtropical or tropical moist montane forest. It is threatened by habitat loss.
