= Syngamia latifusalis =

Scientific classification
- Kingdom: Animalia
- Phylum: Arthropoda
- Class: Insecta
- Order: Lepidoptera
- Family: Crambidae
- Genus: Syngamia
- Species: S. latifusalis

Binomial name
- Syngamia latifusalis Hampson, 1896

Species of moth

Syngamia latifusalis is a moth in the family Crambidae. It was described by George Hampson in 1896. It is found in the Tenasserim Hills at the border between Myanmar and Thailand.
