= Bapara agasta =

Scientific classification
- Domain: Eukaryota
- Kingdom: Animalia
- Phylum: Arthropoda
- Class: Insecta
- Order: Lepidoptera
- Family: Pyralidae
- Genus: Bapara
- Species: B. agasta

Binomial name
- Bapara agasta (Turner, 1911)

Synonyms
- Hypolophota agasta Turner, 1911

Species of moth

Bapara agasta is a species of snout moth in the genus Bapara. It was described by Turner in 1911, and is known from northern Australia.
