= Agrionympha fuscoapicella =

Scientific classification
- Domain: Eukaryota
- Kingdom: Animalia
- Phylum: Arthropoda
- Class: Insecta
- Order: Lepidoptera
- Family: Micropterigidae
- Genus: Agrionympha
- Species: A. fuscoapicella

Binomial name
- Agrionympha fuscoapicella Gibbs, 2011

Moth species in family Micropterigidae

Agrionympha fuscoapicella is a species of moth belonging to the family Micropterigidae. It was described by George W. Gibbs and Niels P. Kristensen in 2011. It is found in South Africa, where it is known only from Hogsback in the Eastern Cape.

The length of the forewings is about 3 mm (0.12 in) for males and 3.4–3.5 mm (0.13–0.14 in) for females.
