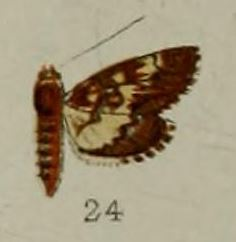
- Syngamia dentilinealis

Scientific classification
- Kingdom: Animalia
- Phylum: Arthropoda
- Class: Insecta
- Order: Lepidoptera
- Family: Crambidae
- Subfamily: Spilomelinae
- Genus: Syngamia; Guenée, 1854

Synonyms
- Ochlia Hübner, 1823

= Syngamia =

Genus of moths

Syngamia is a genus of moths of the family Crambidae.

== Current species ==
- Syngamia albiceps Hampson, 1912
- Syngamia binotalis (Warren, 1896)
- Syngamia canarialis (Snellen, 1899)
- Syngamia convulsa Meyrick, 1936
- Syngamia dentilinealis Hampson, 1899
- Syngamia eoidalis (C. Felder, R. Felder & Rogenhofer, 1875)
- Syngamia eos Druce, 1902
- Syngamia euryterminalis Hampson, 1917
- Syngamia exigualis (Hübner, 1823)
- Syngamia falsidicalis (Walker, 1859)
- Syngamia fervidalis (Zeller, 1852)
- Syngamia florella (Stoll in Cramer & Stoll, 1781)
- Syngamia glebosalis Viette, 1960
- Syngamia interrogata Whalley, 1962
- Syngamia jeanneli Viette, 1954
- Syngamia latifusalis Hampson, 1896
- Syngamia latimarginalis (Walker, 1859)
- Syngamia liquidalis (Zeller, 1852)
- Syngamia luteofusalis (Mabille, 1900)
- Syngamia moluccalis (C. Felder, R. Felder & Rogenhofer, 1875)
- Syngamia oggalis Swinhoe, 1906
- Syngamia violata (Fabricius, 1787)
- Syngamia violescentalis Hampson, 1895

== Former species ==
- Syngamia aeruginosa Ghesquière, 1940
- Syngamia aurantiaca Hampson, 1912
- Syngamia longicornalis Mabille, 1900
