= Bacotoma abjungalis =

Scientific classification
- Domain: Eukaryota
- Kingdom: Animalia
- Phylum: Arthropoda
- Class: Insecta
- Order: Lepidoptera
- Family: Crambidae
- Subfamily: Spilomelinae
- Genus: Bacotoma
- Species: B. abjungalis

Binomial name
- Bacotoma abjungalis (Walker, 1859)

Synonyms
- Botys abjungalis Walker, 1859

Species of moth

Bacotoma abjungalis is a moth in the family Crambidae. It was described by Francis Walker in 1859. It is found in Sri Lanka.
