= Syngamia oggalis =

Scientific classification
- Kingdom: Animalia
- Phylum: Arthropoda
- Class: Insecta
- Order: Lepidoptera
- Family: Crambidae
- Genus: Syngamia
- Species: S. oggalis

Binomial name
- Syngamia oggalis (C. Swinhoe, 1906)

Synonyms
- Platamonia oggalis C. Swinhoe, 1906

Species of moth

Syngamia oggalis is a moth in the family Crambidae. It was described by Charles Swinhoe in 1906. It is found in Meghalaya, India.

The wings are pale luteous (muddy-yellowish) grey, the forewings with a blackish spot in the middle of the cell and a lunule at the end. There is an antemedial, outwardly curved, brown line. There is also a discal line, more or less crenulated, starting from a spot on the costa, sharply bent inwards below the middle until it nearly reaches below the discal lunule, then straight to the hindmargin, and continued across the hindwings in a nearly straight form, it is disjointed in the middle and the space beyond the outer line is suffused with purple.
