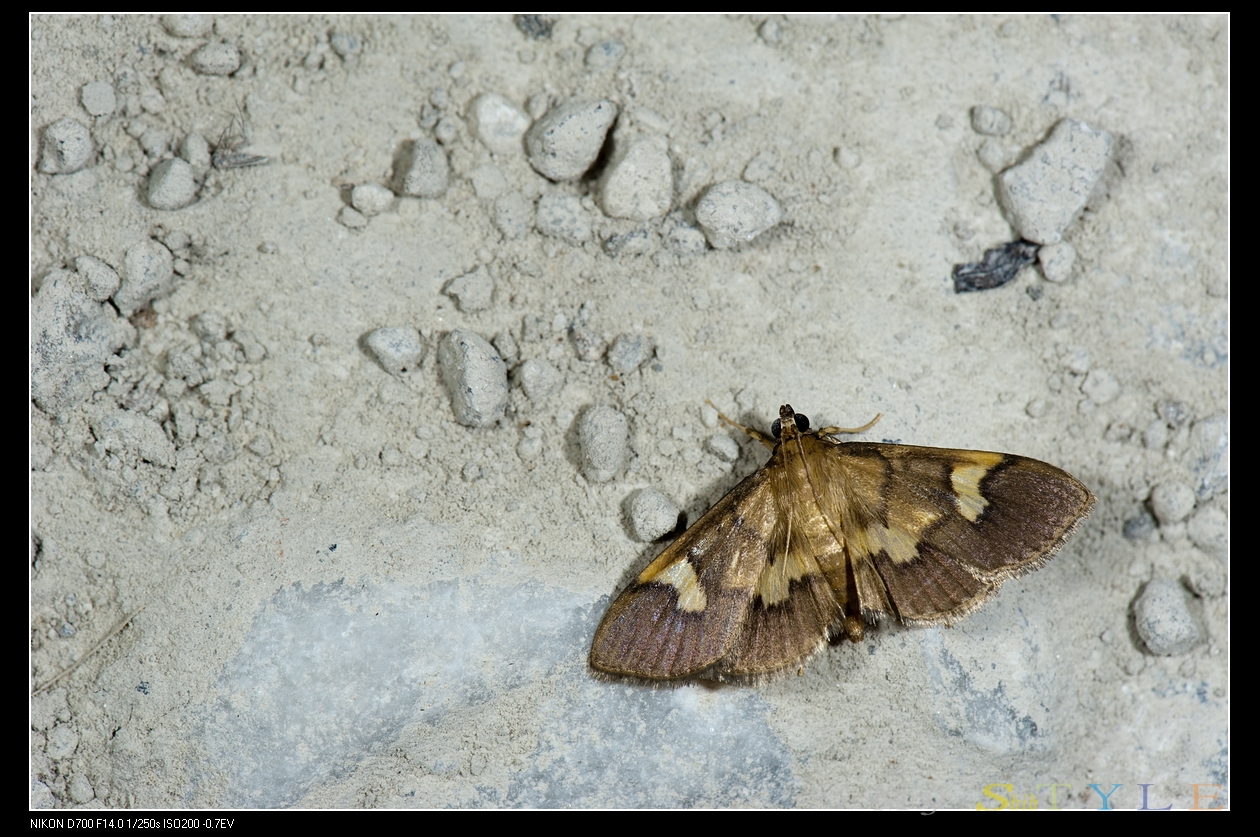

Scientific classification
- Kingdom: Animalia
- Phylum: Arthropoda
- Class: Insecta
- Order: Lepidoptera
- Family: Crambidae
- Genus: Syngamia
- Species: S. falsidicalis

Binomial name
- Syngamia falsidicalis (Walker, 1859)

Synonyms
- Asopia falsidicalis Walker, 1859; Pyrausta suisharyonalis Strand, 1918

= Syngamia falsidicalis =

Species of moth

Syngamia falsidicalis is a moth in the family Crambidae. It was described by Francis Walker in 1859. It is found in the Democratic Republic of the Congo (Equateur), Zimbabwe, China, Sri Lanka and Taiwan.
