= Syngamia violescentalis =

Scientific classification
- Kingdom: Animalia
- Phylum: Arthropoda
- Class: Insecta
- Order: Lepidoptera
- Family: Crambidae
- Genus: Syngamia
- Species: S. violescentalis

Binomial name
- Syngamia violescentalis Hampson, 1895

Species of moth

Syngamia violescentalis is a moth in the family Crambidae. It was described by George Hampson in 1895. It is found in Grenada.

The wingspan is about 10 mm. Adults are dark purplish grey, the wings irrorated (sprinkled) with bright scales. There is a nearly straight medial rufous line and curved postmedial line. The hindwings have a nearly straight medial line and obliquely curved postmedial line. Both wings have a pure white cilia, with a dark line at base.
