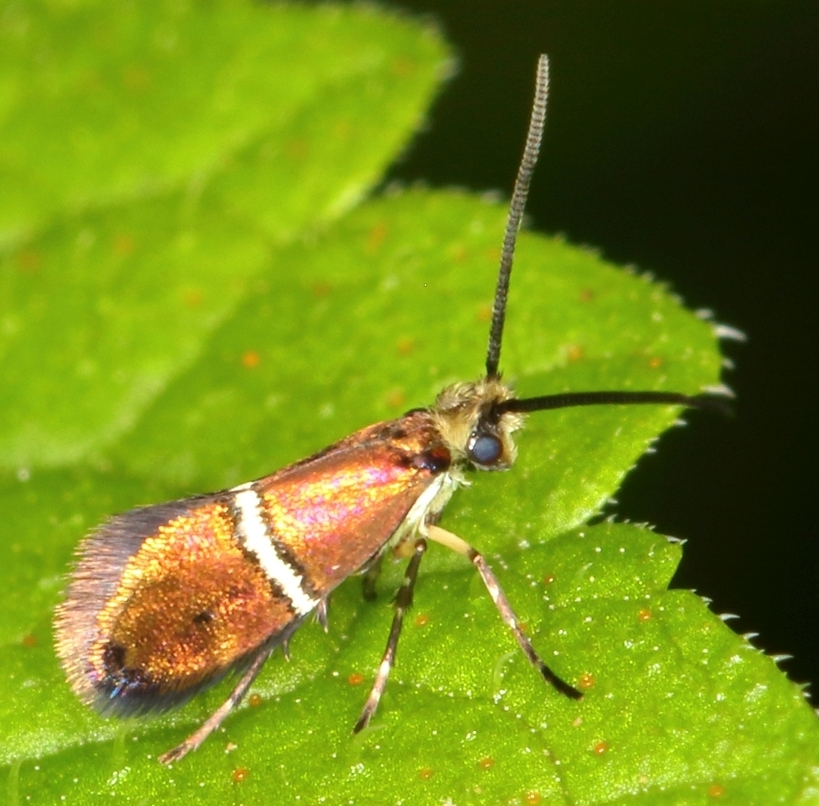
- Agrionympha cf. jansella

Scientific classification
- Domain: Eukaryota
- Kingdom: Animalia
- Phylum: Arthropoda
- Class: Insecta
- Order: Lepidoptera
- Family: Micropterigidae
- Genus: Agrionympha; Meyrick, 1921

Species
- see text.

= Agrionympha =

Genus of moths in family Micropterigidae

Agrionympha is a genus of small primitive metallic moths in the family Micropterigidae, and the only described micropterigid genus in Africa.

The genus is associated with Afrotemperate Forest, and is endemic to South Africa. The larvae fed on liverworts, and the adult moths appear to require sheltered, humid sites (they are often found amongst ferns).

== Species ==
The following species are recognised:

- Agrionympha capensis Whalley, 1978
- Agrionympha fuscoapicella Gibbs, 2011
- Agrionympha jansella Gibbs, 2011
- Agrionympha karoo Gibbs, 2011
- Agrionympha kroonella Gibbs, 2011
- Agrionympha pseliacma Meyrick, 1921
- Agrionympha pseudovari Gibbs, 2011
- Agrionympha sagittella Gibbs, 2011
- Agrionympha vari Whalley, 1978
