= Prophantis coenostolalis =

Scientific classification
- Kingdom: Animalia
- Phylum: Arthropoda
- Class: Insecta
- Order: Lepidoptera
- Family: Crambidae
- Genus: Prophantis
- Species: P. coenostolalis

Binomial name
- Prophantis coenostolalis Hampson, 1899

Species of moth

Prophantis coenostolalis is a moth in the family Crambidae. It was described by George Hampson in 1899. It is found in Sierra Leone. It was formerly placed in the Pyraustinae genus Thliptoceras.
