= Aethaloessa floridalis =

Scientific classification
- Kingdom: Animalia
- Phylum: Arthropoda
- Class: Insecta
- Order: Lepidoptera
- Family: Crambidae
- Subfamily: Spilomelinae
- Genus: Aethaloessa
- Species: A. floridalis

Binomial name
- Aethaloessa floridalis (Zeller, 1852)

Synonyms
- Stenia floridalis Zeller, 1852; Syngamia merionealis Walker, 1859; Syngamia merionalis Lederer, 1863

Species of moth

Aethaloessa floridalis is a moth of the family Crambidae described by Philipp Christoph Zeller in 1852. It is found throughout of subtropical Africa, including islands of the Indian Ocean and South and South-East Asia.
