= Prophantis triplagalis =

Scientific classification
- Domain: Eukaryota
- Kingdom: Animalia
- Phylum: Arthropoda
- Class: Insecta
- Order: Lepidoptera
- Family: Crambidae
- Genus: Prophantis
- Species: P. triplagalis

Binomial name
- Prophantis triplagalis Warren, 1896

Species of moth

Prophantis triplagalis is a moth in the family Crambidae. It was described by William Warren in 1896. It is found in India, where it has been recorded from the Khasia Hills.

The wingspan is about 30 mm. The forewings are shining purplish grey, but the costa and a line of marginal dots are yellow. There is a square, pale yellow, dark-edged spot in the middle of the cell and a larger irregularly reniform pale yellow blotch from the costa beyond the cell, with a darker dentate outer edge and a faint yellowish spot or two obliquely below it towards the base. The hindwings are like the forewings, but without an inner spot.
