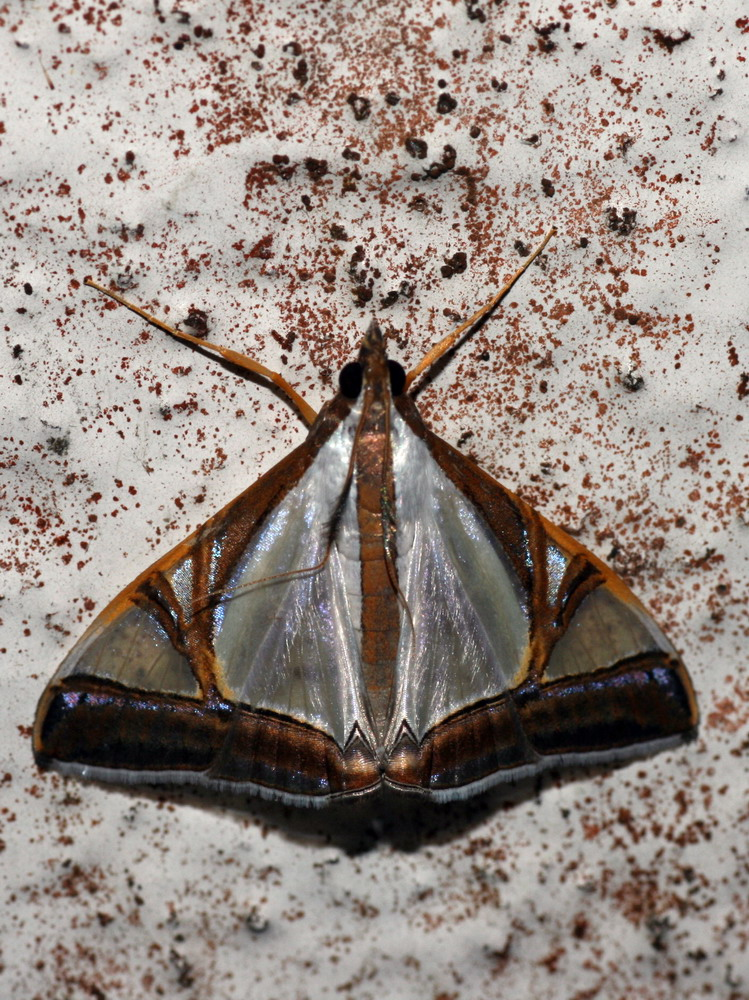
- Agrioglypta eurytusalis

Scientific classification
- Kingdom: Animalia
- Phylum: Arthropoda
- Clade: Pancrustacea
- Class: Insecta
- Order: Lepidoptera
- Family: Crambidae
- Tribe: Margaroniini
- Genus: Agrioglypta; Meyrick, 1932

= Agrioglypta =

Genus of moths

Agrioglypta is a genus of moths of the family Crambidae.

== Species ==
- Agrioglypta buxtoni (Tams, 1935)
- Agrioglypta deliciosa Butler, 1887
- Agrioglypta enneactis Meyrick, 1932
- Agrioglypta eurytusalis (Walker, 1859)
- Agrioglypta excelsalis (Walker, [1866])
- Agrioglypta itysalis (Walker, 1859)
- Agrioglypta juvenalis (Rebel, 1915)
- Agrioglypta malayana (Butler, 1881)
- Agrioglypta proximalis (Whalley, 1962)
- Agrioglypta samoana (Swinhoe, 1906)
- Agrioglypta zelimalis (Walker, 1859)
