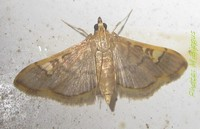

Scientific classification
- Kingdom: Animalia
- Phylum: Arthropoda
- Clade: Pancrustacea
- Class: Insecta
- Order: Lepidoptera
- Family: Crambidae
- Genus: Prophantis
- Species: P. longicornalis

Binomial name
- Prophantis longicornalis (Mabille, 1900)

Synonyms
- Sylepta [sic] acutipennalis Kenrick, 1917

= Prophantis longicornalis =

Species of moth

Prophantis longicornalis is a moth of the family Crambidae. It occurs in Madagascar and La Réunion. It was formerly placed in the Spilomelinae genus Syngamia. It is of brown colour with a wingspan of 20–22 mm.
