= Syngamia fervidalis =

Scientific classification
- Kingdom: Animalia
- Phylum: Arthropoda
- Clade: Pancrustacea
- Class: Insecta
- Order: Lepidoptera
- Family: Crambidae
- Genus: Syngamia
- Species: S. fervidalis

Binomial name
- Syngamia fervidalis (Zeller, 1852)

Synonyms
- Stenia fervidalis Zeller, 1852; Asopia biblisalis Walker, 1859

Species of moth

Syngamia fervidalis is a moth in the family Crambidae. It was described by Zeller in 1852. It is found in Equatorial Guinea, Malawi, Sierra Leone and South Africa.
