= Cotachena aluensis =

Scientific classification
- Domain: Eukaryota
- Kingdom: Animalia
- Phylum: Arthropoda
- Class: Insecta
- Order: Lepidoptera
- Family: Crambidae
- Subfamily: Spilomelinae
- Genus: Cotachena
- Species: C. aluensis

Binomial name
- Cotachena aluensis (Butler, 1887)

Synonyms
- Botys aluensis Butler, 1887; Cotachena fenestralis Warren, 1895

Species of moth

Cotachena aluensis is a moth in the family Crambidae. It was described by Arthur Gardiner Butler in 1887. It is found in the Solomon Islands and in Australia, where it has been recorded from Queensland.
