= Syngamia violata =

Scientific classification
- Kingdom: Animalia
- Phylum: Arthropoda
- Class: Insecta
- Order: Lepidoptera
- Family: Crambidae
- Genus: Syngamia
- Species: S. violata

Binomial name
- Syngamia violata (Fabricius, 1787)

Synonyms
- Phalaena violata Fabricius, 1787

Species of moth

Syngamia violata is a moth in the family Crambidae. It was described by Johan Christian Fabricius in 1787. It is found in Tamil Nadu, India.
