= Agrioglypta juvenalis =

Scientific classification
- Kingdom: Animalia
- Phylum: Arthropoda
- Clade: Pancrustacea
- Class: Insecta
- Order: Lepidoptera
- Family: Crambidae
- Genus: Agrioglypta
- Species: A. juvenalis

Binomial name
- Agrioglypta juvenalis (Rebel, 1915)

Synonyms
- Glyphodes juvenalis Rebel, 1915

Species of moth

Agrioglypta juvenalis is a moth in the family Crambidae. It is found on Samoa.
