= Syngamia exigualis =

Scientific classification
- Kingdom: Animalia
- Phylum: Arthropoda
- Clade: Pancrustacea
- Class: Insecta
- Order: Lepidoptera
- Family: Crambidae
- Genus: Syngamia
- Species: S. exigualis

Binomial name
- Syngamia exigualis (Hübner, 1823)

Synonyms
- Ochlia exigualis Hübner, 1823

Species of moth

Syngamia exigualis is a moth in the family Crambidae. It was described by Jacob Hübner in 1823. It is found in Suriname.
