= Cotachena fuscimarginalis =

Scientific classification
- Domain: Eukaryota
- Kingdom: Animalia
- Phylum: Arthropoda
- Class: Insecta
- Order: Lepidoptera
- Family: Crambidae
- Subfamily: Spilomelinae
- Genus: Cotachena
- Species: C. fuscimarginalis

Binomial name
- Cotachena fuscimarginalis Hampson, 1916

Species of moth

Cotachena fuscimarginalis is a moth in the family Crambidae. It was described by George Hampson in 1916. It is found in New Guinea and Australia.
