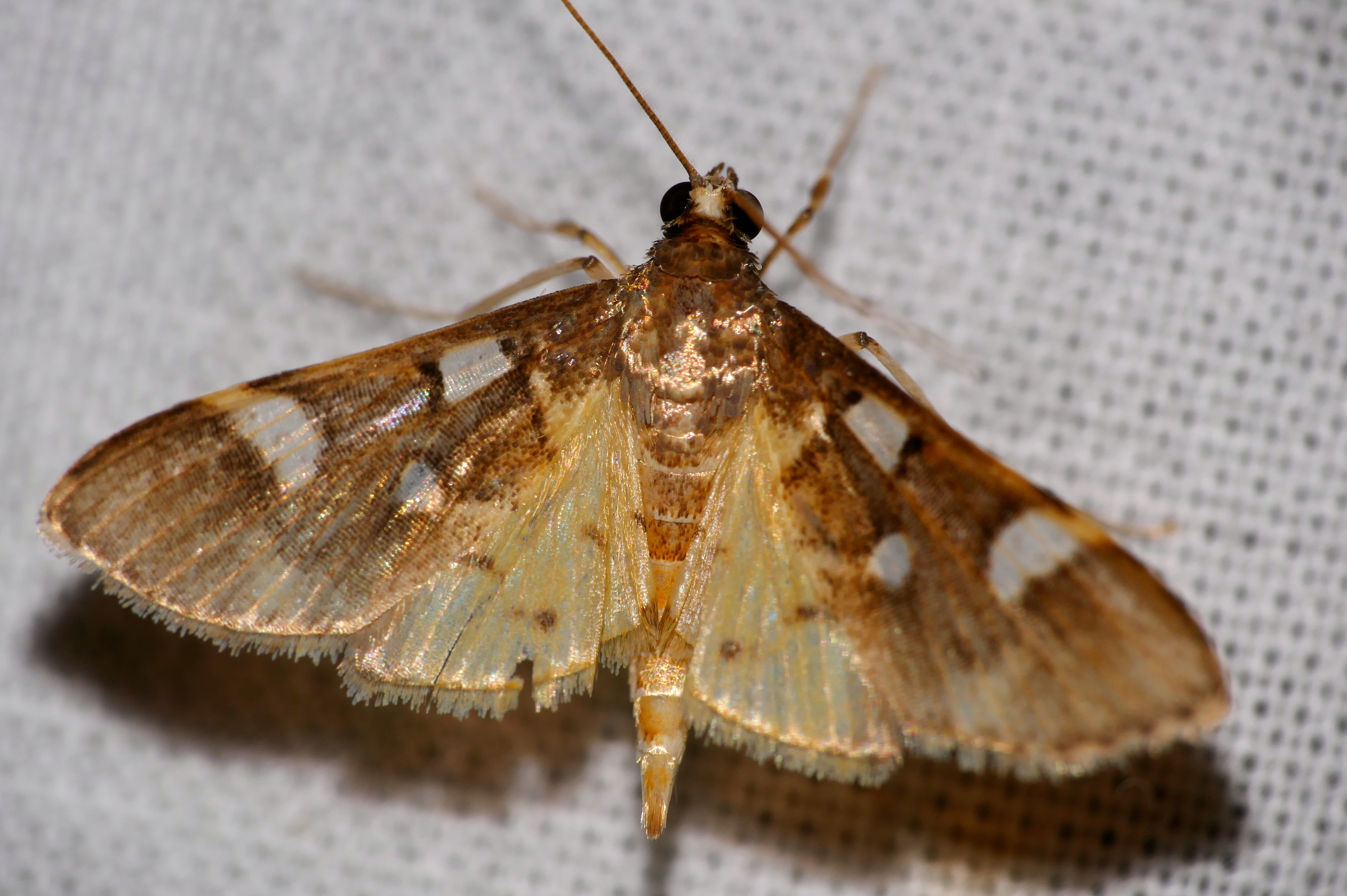
- Cotachena pubescens

Scientific classification
- Kingdom: Animalia
- Phylum: Arthropoda
- Clade: Pancrustacea
- Class: Insecta
- Order: Lepidoptera
- Family: Crambidae
- Subfamily: Spilomelinae
- Genus: Cotachena
- Species: C. pubescens

Binomial name
- Cotachena pubescens Warren, 1892

= Cotachena pubescens =

Species of moth

Cotachena pubescens is a moth in the family Crambidae. It was described by Warren in 1892. It is found in Taiwan, China, Indonesia, Bhutan and Thailand.
