= Agrionympha kroonella =

Scientific classification
- Domain: Eukaryota
- Kingdom: Animalia
- Phylum: Arthropoda
- Class: Insecta
- Order: Lepidoptera
- Family: Micropterigidae
- Genus: Agrionympha
- Species: A. kroonella

Binomial name
- Agrionympha kroonella Gibbs, 2011

Moth species in family Micropterigidae

Agrionympha kroonella is a species of moth belonging to the family Micropterigidae. It was described by George W. Gibbs and Niels P. Kristensen in 2011. It is found in South Africa, where it is known only from the Drakensberg Ranges in the Mpumalanga Province.

The habitat consists of moist ferns and low shrubs between taller forests and higher altitude low fynbos-type vegetation.

The length of the forewings is 3.1–3.3 mm for males and females.
