= Agrioglypta buxtoni =

Scientific classification
- Kingdom: Animalia
- Phylum: Arthropoda
- Clade: Pancrustacea
- Class: Insecta
- Order: Lepidoptera
- Family: Crambidae
- Genus: Agrioglypta
- Species: A. buxtoni

Binomial name
- Agrioglypta buxtoni (Tams, 1935)

Synonyms
- Margaronia buxtoni Tams, 1935

Species of moth

Agrioglypta buxtoni is a moth in the family Crambidae. It is found on Samoa.
