= Agrioglypta deliciosa =

Scientific classification
- Kingdom: Animalia
- Phylum: Arthropoda
- Clade: Pancrustacea
- Class: Insecta
- Order: Lepidoptera
- Family: Crambidae
- Genus: Agrioglypta
- Species: A. deliciosa

Binomial name
- Agrioglypta deliciosa (Butler, 1887)

Synonyms
- Glyphodes deliciosa Butler, 1887; Talanga deliciosa; Glyphodes hageni Hering, 1901

Species of moth

Agrioglypta deliciosa is a moth in the family Crambidae. It is found on the Solomon Islands, as well as in New Guinea and Australia, where it is found in the tropical far north of Queensland.

The wingspan is about 25 mm. The forewings have a pattern of white and brown bands and triangles.
