= Cotachena brunnealis =

Scientific classification
- Domain: Eukaryota
- Kingdom: Animalia
- Phylum: Arthropoda
- Class: Insecta
- Order: Lepidoptera
- Family: Crambidae
- Subfamily: Spilomelinae
- Genus: Cotachena
- Species: C. brunnealis

Binomial name
- Cotachena brunnealis Yamanaka, 2001

Species of moth

Cotachena brunnealis is a moth in the family Crambidae. It was described by Hiroshi Yamanaka in 2001. It is found in Kyushu, Japan.
