= Agrionympha vari =

Scientific classification
- Domain: Eukaryota
- Kingdom: Animalia
- Phylum: Arthropoda
- Class: Insecta
- Order: Lepidoptera
- Family: Micropterigidae
- Genus: Agrionympha
- Species: A. vari

Binomial name
- Agrionympha vari Whalley, 1978

Moth species in family Micropterigidae

Agrionympha vari is a species of moth belonging to the family Micropterigidae. It was described by Paul Whalley in 1978. It is found in South Africa, where it is known only from the Mariepskop in the Mpumalanga Province.

The length of the forewings is about 3.5 mm for females.
