= Syngamia liquidalis =

Scientific classification
- Kingdom: Animalia
- Phylum: Arthropoda
- Clade: Pancrustacea
- Class: Insecta
- Order: Lepidoptera
- Family: Crambidae
- Genus: Syngamia
- Species: S. liquidalis

Binomial name
- Syngamia liquidalis (Zeller, 1852)

Synonyms
- Stenia liquidalis Zeller, 1852

Species of moth

Syngamia liquidalis is a moth in the family Crambidae. It was described by Zeller in 1852. It is found in Cameroon, the Democratic Republic of Congo (Katanga, Equateur, East Kasai) and South Africa.
