= Agrioglypta excelsalis =

Scientific classification
- Kingdom: Animalia
- Phylum: Arthropoda
- Clade: Pancrustacea
- Class: Insecta
- Order: Lepidoptera
- Family: Crambidae
- Genus: Agrioglypta
- Species: A. excelsalis

Binomial name
- Agrioglypta excelsalis (Walker, [1866])

Synonyms
- Glyphodes excelsalis Walker, [1866]; Margaronia samoana Swinhoe 1906; Glyphodes pedenotata Warren, 1896b; Glyphodes westermani Snellen,1877b

Species of moth

Agrioglypta excelsalis is a moth in the family Crambidae described by Francis Walker in 1866. It is found on Sulawesi, Lifou Island, as well as in Bhutan, Thailand, Sumatra, Papua New Guinea, Samoa and in Australia, where it has been Western Australia, Queensland and northern New South Wales.
