= Bapara (moth) =

Scientific classification
- Domain: Eukaryota
- Kingdom: Animalia
- Phylum: Arthropoda
- Class: Insecta
- Order: Lepidoptera
- Family: Pyralidae
- Subfamily: Galleriinae
- Tribe: Tirathabini
- Genus: Bapara; Walker, 1865

Genus of moths

Bapara is a genus of snout moths. It was described by Francis Walker in 1865 and is known from Australia and New Guinea.

== Species ==
- Bapara agasta (Turner, 1911)
- Bapara obliterosa Walker, 1865
- Bapara pandana Whalley, 1964
- Bapara paynei Whalley, 1964
