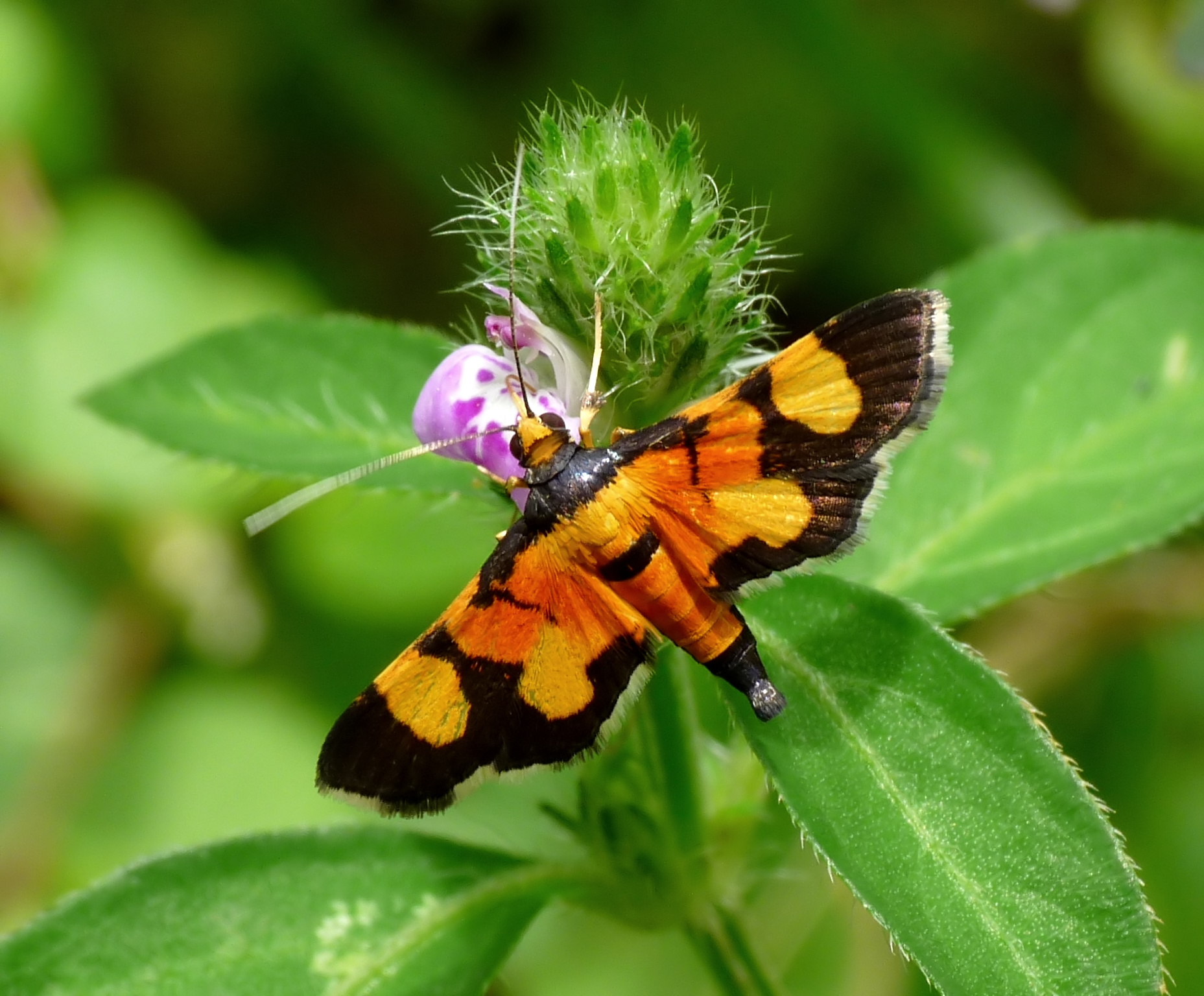
- Aethaloessa calidalis

Scientific classification
- Kingdom: Animalia
- Phylum: Arthropoda
- Clade: Pancrustacea
- Class: Insecta
- Order: Lepidoptera
- Family: Crambidae
- Subfamily: Spilomelinae
- Genus: Aethaloessa; Lederer, 1863

Synonyms
- Chnaura Lederer, 1863; Athaloessa Snellen, 1880

= Aethaloessa =

Genus of moths

Aethaloessa is a genus of moths of the family Crambidae.

== Species ==
- Aethaloessa calidalis (Guenée, 1854)
- Aethaloessa floridalis (Zeller, 1852)
- Aethaloessa rufula Whalley, 1961
