= Syngamia eos =

Scientific classification
- Kingdom: Animalia
- Phylum: Arthropoda
- Class: Insecta
- Order: Lepidoptera
- Family: Crambidae
- Genus: Syngamia
- Species: S. eos

Binomial name
- Syngamia eos H. Druce, 1902

Species of moth

Syngamia eos is a moth in the family Crambidae. It was described by Herbert Druce in 1902. It is found in Cameroon, the Democratic Republic of the Congo (Kasai-Oriental), Madagascar and Zambia.
