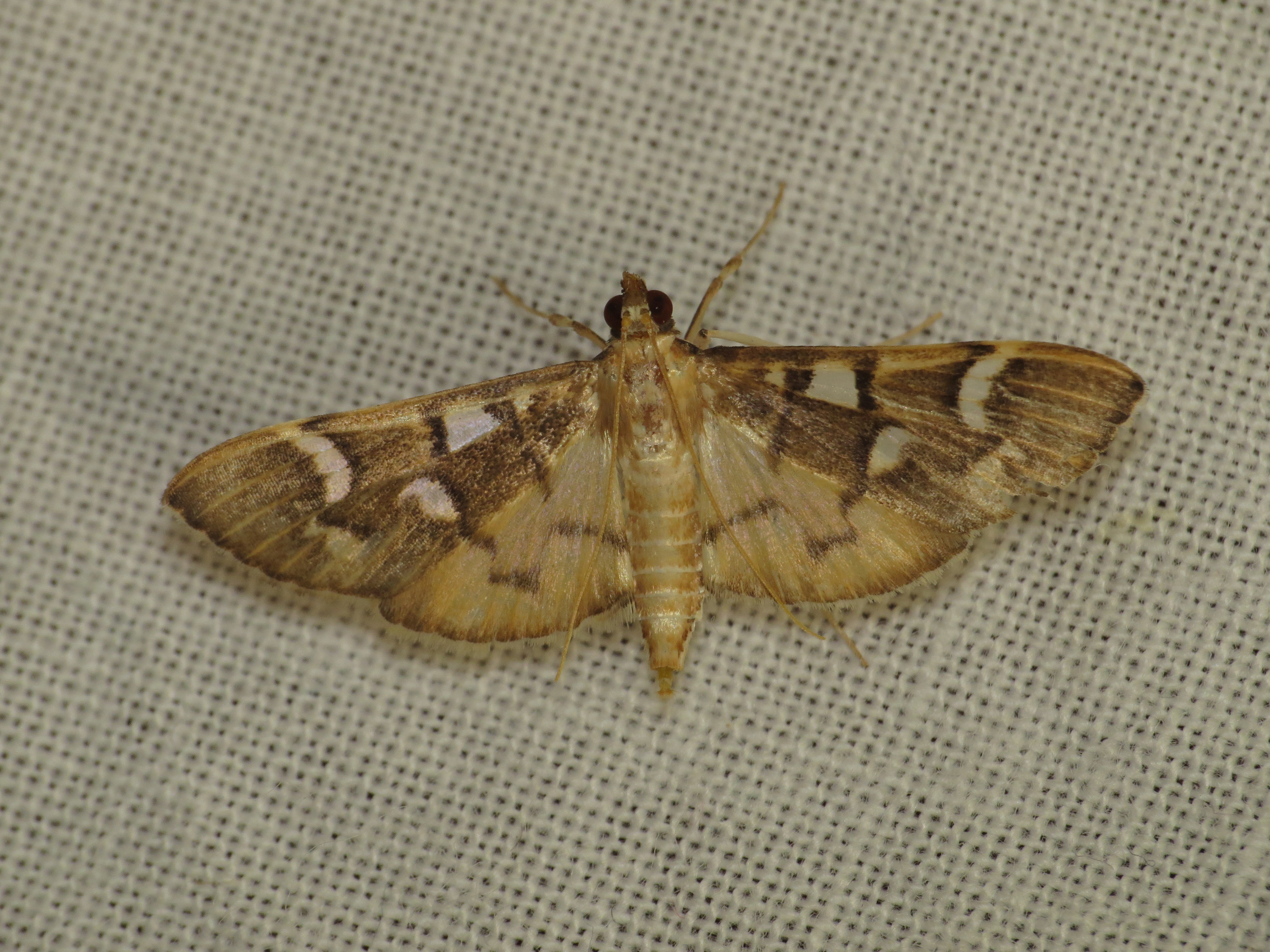

Scientific classification
- Kingdom: Animalia
- Phylum: Arthropoda
- Class: Insecta
- Order: Lepidoptera
- Family: Crambidae
- Genus: Cotachena
- Species: C. histricalis

Binomial name
- Cotachena histricalis (Walker, 1859)

Synonyms
- Botys histricalis Walker, 1859; Cotachena orientalis Rothschild, 1915; Cotachena peractalis Warren, 1896; Cotachena peractilis Whalley, 1961; Cotochena trinotata Butler, 1887

= Cotachena histricalis =

Species of moth

Cotachena histricalis is a moth in the family Crambidae. It was described by Francis Walker in 1859.It is found in New Guinea, Indonesia (Tanimbar Islands) and on the Solomon Islands, as well as in China and Australia, where it has been recorded from Queensland.

The wingspan is about 20 mm.
