= Agrioglypta enneactis =

Scientific classification
- Kingdom: Animalia
- Phylum: Arthropoda
- Clade: Pancrustacea
- Class: Insecta
- Order: Lepidoptera
- Family: Crambidae
- Genus: Agrioglypta
- Species: A. enneactis

Binomial name
- Agrioglypta enneactis Meyrick, 1932

Species of moth

Agrioglypta enneactis is a moth in the family of Crambidae. It is found on Fiji.
