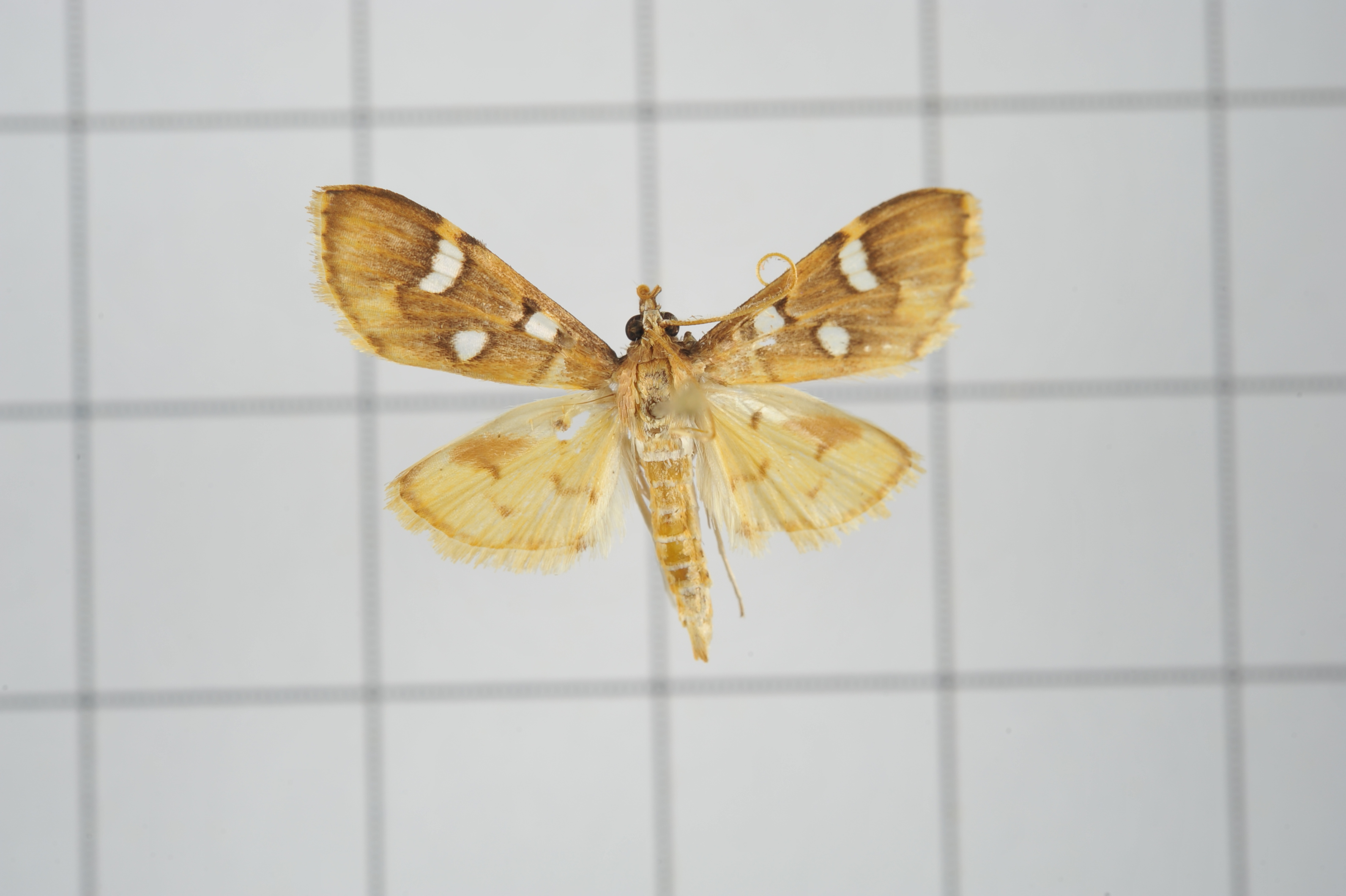

Scientific classification
- Domain: Eukaryota
- Kingdom: Animalia
- Phylum: Arthropoda
- Class: Insecta
- Order: Lepidoptera
- Family: Crambidae
- Subfamily: Spilomelinae
- Genus: Cotachena
- Species: C. taiwanalis

Binomial name
- Cotachena taiwanalis Yamanaka, 2001

= Cotachena taiwanalis =

Species of moth

Cotachena taiwanalis is a moth in the family Crambidae. It was described by Hiroshi Yamanaka in 2001. It is found in Taiwan and Korea.
