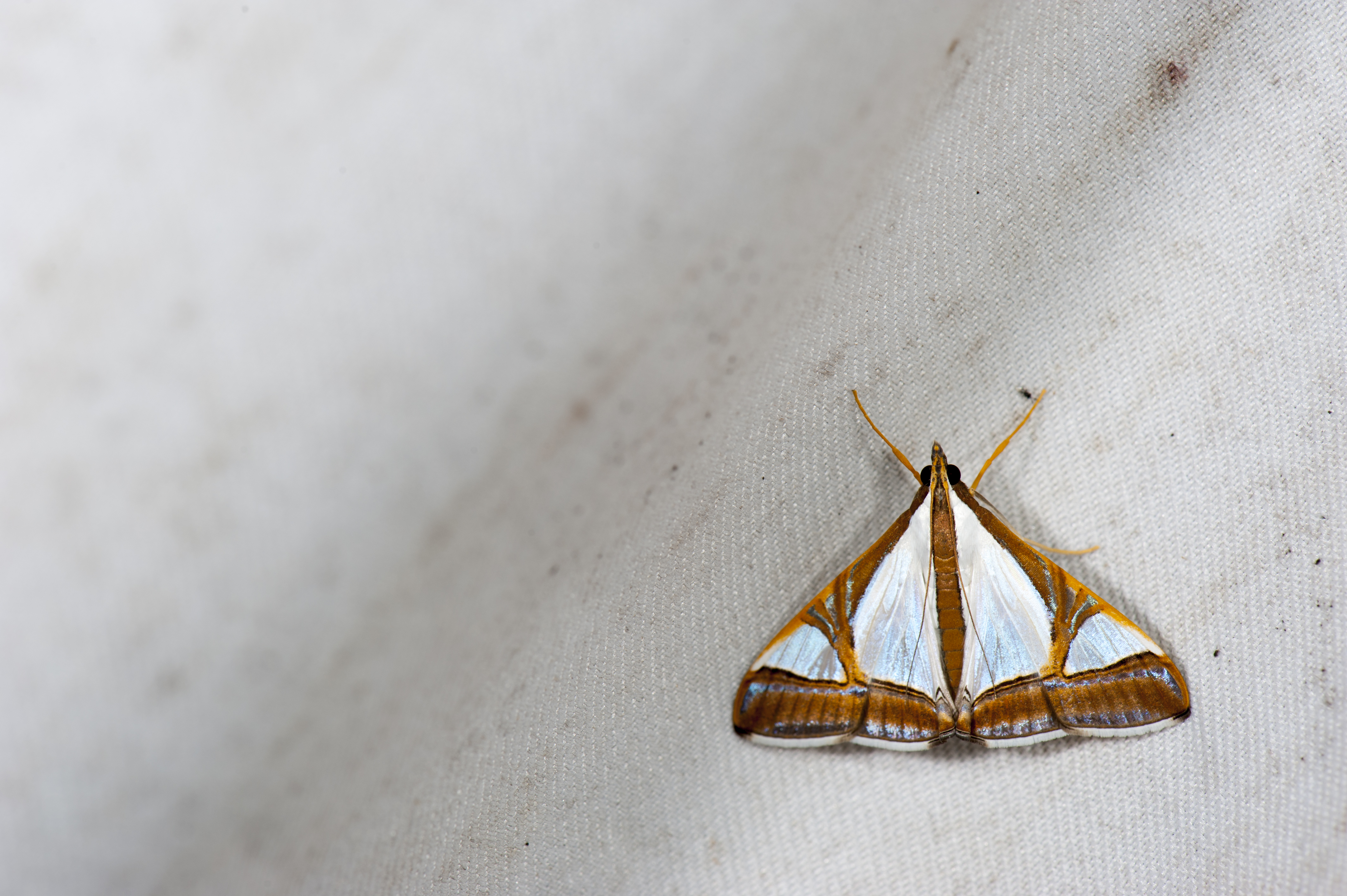

Scientific classification
- Kingdom: Animalia
- Phylum: Arthropoda
- Clade: Pancrustacea
- Class: Insecta
- Order: Lepidoptera
- Family: Crambidae
- Genus: Agrioglypta
- Species: A. eurytusalis

Binomial name
- Agrioglypta eurytusalis (Walker, 1859)

Synonyms
- Glyphodes eurytusalis Walker, 1859; Glyphodes opalalis Hampson, 1891; Margaronia episcopalis Meyrick, 1938

= Agrioglypta eurytusalis =

Species of moth

Agrioglypta eurytusalis is a moth in the family Crambidae described by Francis Walker in 1859. It is found in southern India, Sri Lanka, Borneo, Cambodia, Thailand, Taiwan, Japan and Australia, where it has been recorded from northern Queensland.
