= Syngamia jeanneli =

Scientific classification
- Kingdom: Animalia
- Phylum: Arthropoda
- Class: Insecta
- Order: Lepidoptera
- Family: Crambidae
- Genus: Syngamia
- Species: S. jeanneli

Binomial name
- Syngamia jeanneli (Viette, 1954)

Synonyms
- Dixoa jeanneli Viette, 1954

Species of moth

Syngamia jeanneli is a moth in the family Crambidae. It was described by Viette in 1954. It is found in Madagascar.
