= Agrioglypta zelimalis =

Scientific classification
- Kingdom: Animalia
- Phylum: Arthropoda
- Clade: Pancrustacea
- Class: Insecta
- Order: Lepidoptera
- Family: Crambidae
- Genus: Agrioglypta
- Species: A. zelimalis

Binomial name
- Agrioglypta zelimalis (Walker, 1859)

Synonyms
- Glyphodes zelimalis Walker, 1859; Glyphodes nyctealis Snellen, [1880]

Species of moth

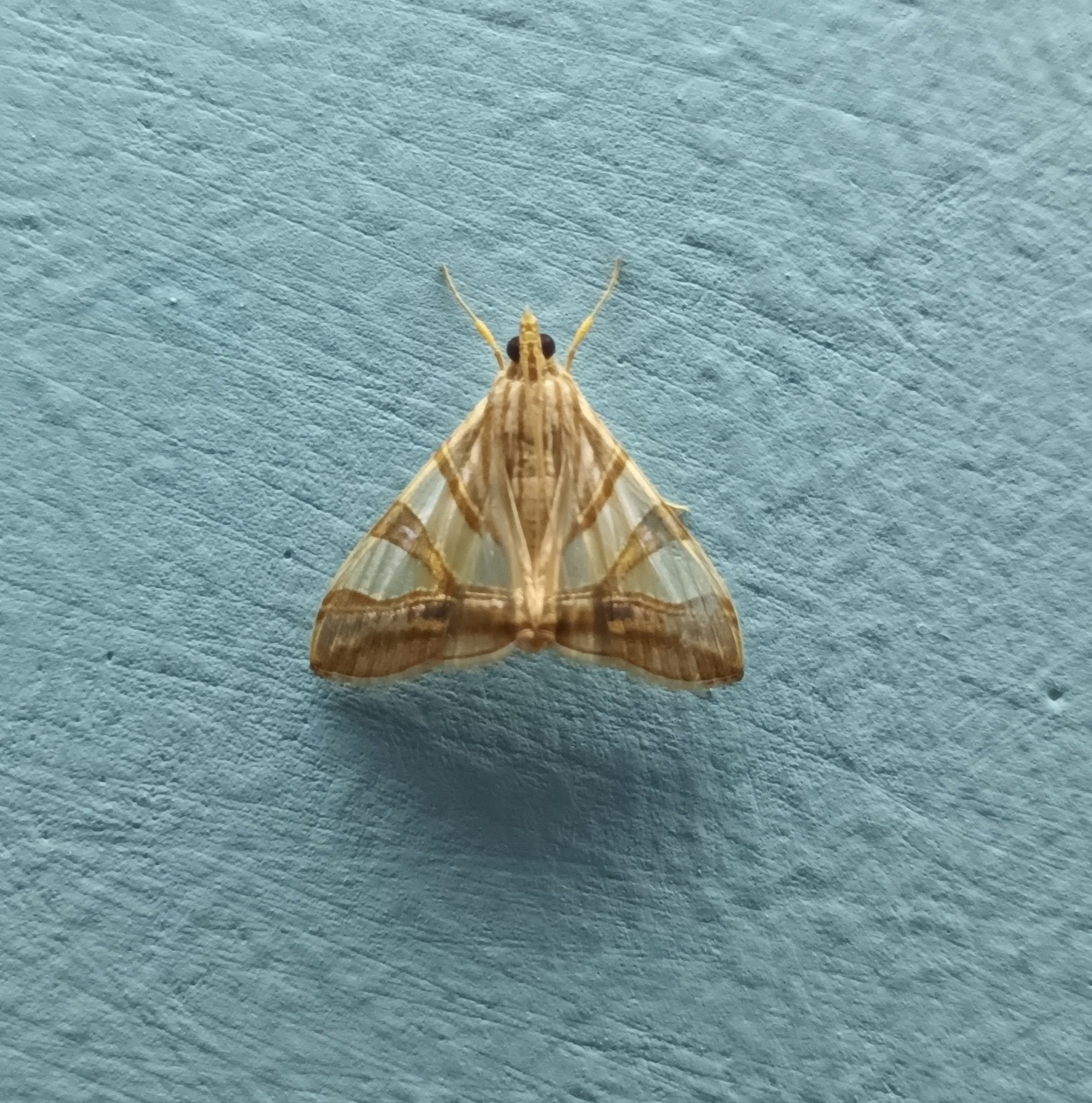
Agrioglypta zelimalis

Agrioglypta zelimalis is a moth in the family Crambidae described by Francis Walker in 1859. It is found in India, Sri Lanka, Indonesia (Sumatra, Borneo), New Caledonia and Australia, where it has been recorded in Queensland.
