= Prophantis androstigmata =

Scientific classification
- Kingdom: Animalia
- Phylum: Arthropoda
- Class: Insecta
- Order: Lepidoptera
- Family: Crambidae
- Genus: Prophantis
- Species: P. androstigmata

Binomial name
- Prophantis androstigmata (Hampson, 1918)

Synonyms
- Thliptoceras androstigmata Hampson, 1918

Species of moth

Prophantis androstigmata is a moth in the family Crambidae. It was described by George Hampson in 1918. It is found on New Guinea and Australia, where it has been recorded from Queensland.

The wings are brown with yellow margins and white spots on the forewings.
