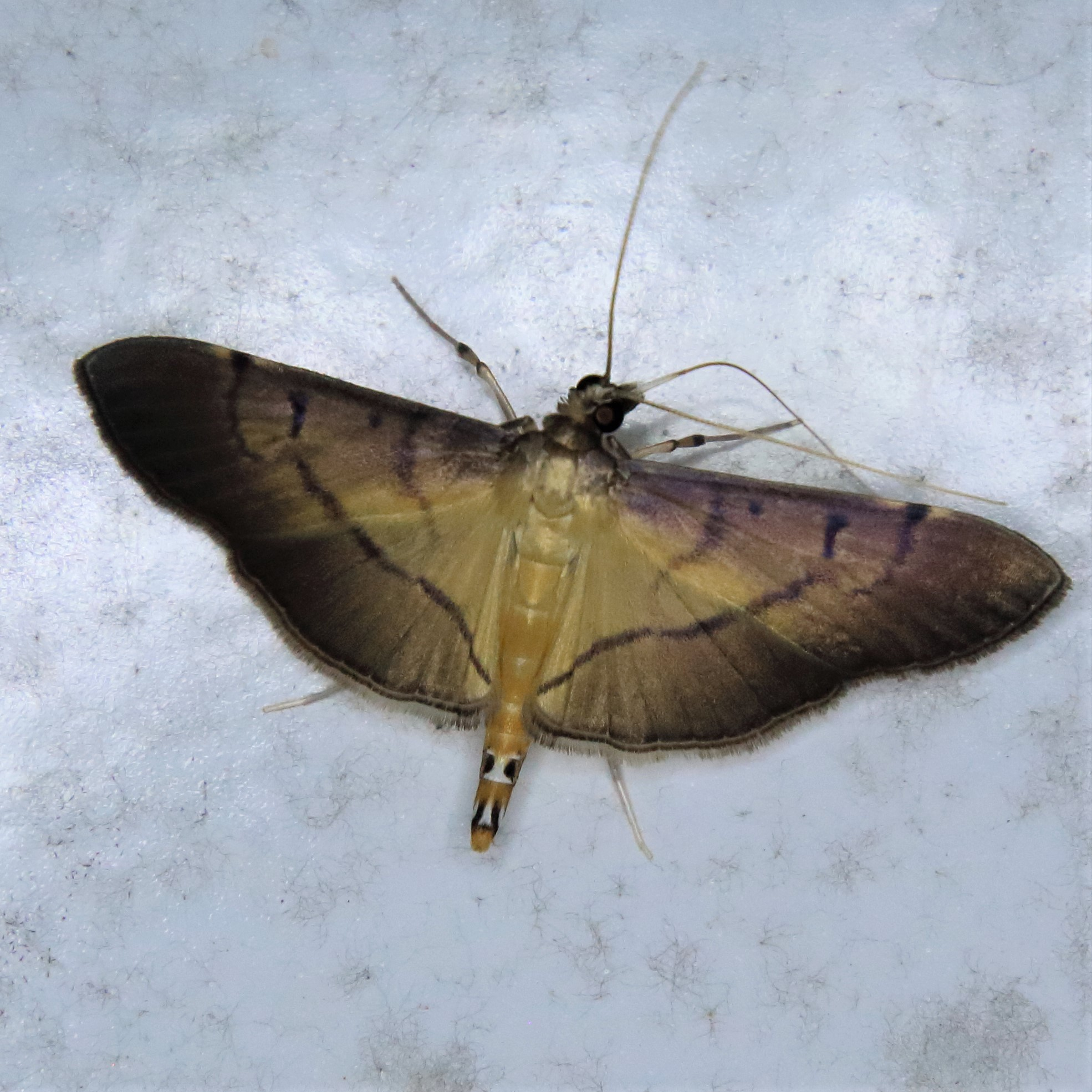

Scientific classification
- Kingdom: Animalia
- Phylum: Arthropoda
- Class: Insecta
- Order: Lepidoptera
- Family: Crambidae
- Subfamily: Spilomelinae
- Genus: Bacotoma
- Species: B. camillusalis

Binomial name
- Bacotoma camillusalis (Walker, 1859)

Synonyms
- Botys camillusalis Walker, 1859

= Bacotoma camillusalis =

Species of moth

Bacotoma camillusalis is a moth in the family Crambidae. It was described by Francis Walker in 1859. It is found on Borneo and in Australia.
