= Agrionympha sagittella =

Scientific classification
- Domain: Eukaryota
- Kingdom: Animalia
- Phylum: Arthropoda
- Class: Insecta
- Order: Lepidoptera
- Family: Micropterigidae
- Genus: Agrionympha
- Species: A. sagittella

Binomial name
- Agrionympha sagittella Gibbs, 2011

Moth species in family Micropterigidae

Agrionympha sagittella is a species of moth belonging to the family Micropterigidae. It was described by George W. Gibbs and Niels P. Kristensen in 2011. It is found in South Africa, where it is known from the Hogsback and Ngadu Forests in the Eastern Cape.

The length of the forewings is 3.2–3.5 mm for males and 3.6–3.8 mm for females.
