= Cotachena hicana =

Scientific classification
- Domain: Eukaryota
- Kingdom: Animalia
- Phylum: Arthropoda
- Class: Insecta
- Order: Lepidoptera
- Family: Crambidae
- Subfamily: Spilomelinae
- Genus: Cotachena
- Species: C. hicana

Binomial name
- Cotachena hicana (Turner, 1915)

Synonyms
- Sylepta hicana Turner, 1915

Species of moth

Cotachena hicana is a moth in the family Crambidae. It was described by Turner in 1915. It is found in Australia, where it has been recorded from the Northern Territory and Queensland.

Adults are pale grey or brown, with dark lines on the wing enclosing paler areas.
