= Prophantis xanthomeralis =

Scientific classification
- Kingdom: Animalia
- Phylum: Arthropoda
- Class: Insecta
- Order: Lepidoptera
- Family: Crambidae
- Genus: Prophantis
- Species: P. xanthomeralis

Binomial name
- Prophantis xanthomeralis Hampson, 1918

Species of moth

Prophantis xanthomeralis is a moth in the family Crambidae. It was described by George Hampson in 1918. It is found in Malawi. It was formerly placed in the Pyraustinae genus Thliptoceras.
