= Agrionympha karoo =

Scientific classification
- Kingdom: Animalia
- Phylum: Arthropoda
- Clade: Pancrustacea
- Class: Insecta
- Order: Lepidoptera
- Family: Micropterigidae
- Genus: Agrionympha
- Species: A. karoo

Binomial name
- Agrionympha karoo Gibbs, 2011

Moth species in family Micropterigidae

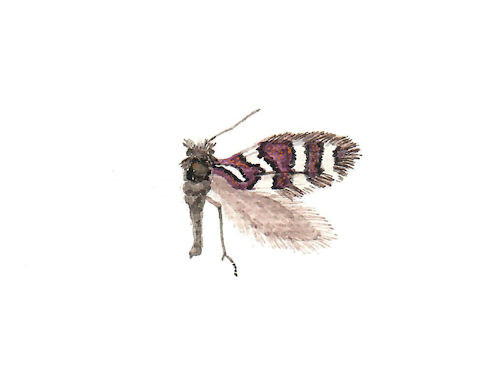
Agrionympha karoo, male.

Agrionympha karoo is a species of moth belonging to the family Micropterigidae. It was described by George W. Gibbs and Niels P. Kristensen in 2011. It is found in South Africa, where it is known only to the Eastern Cape.

The length of the forewings is about 2.5 mm for males and 2.6 mm for females.
