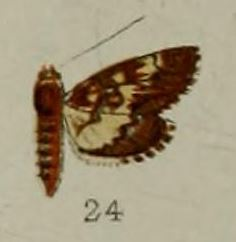

Scientific classification
- Kingdom: Animalia
- Phylum: Arthropoda
- Class: Insecta
- Order: Lepidoptera
- Family: Crambidae
- Genus: Syngamia
- Species: S. dentilinealis

Binomial name
- Syngamia dentilinealis Hampson, 1899

= Syngamia dentilinealis =

Species of moth

Syngamia dentilinealis is a moth of the family Crambidae described by George Hampson in 1899. It is found on Sumatra and Java.
