= Triclisia lanceolata =

Conservation status
- Endangered (IUCN 3.1)

Scientific classification
- Kingdom: Plantae
- Clade: Tracheophytes
- Clade: Angiosperms
- Clade: Eudicots
- Order: Ranunculales
- Family: Menispermaceae
- Genus: Triclisia
- Species: T. lanceolata

Binomial name
- Triclisia lanceolata Troupin

Species of flowering plant

Triclisia lanceolata is a species of plant in the family Menispermaceae. It is found in Cameroon and the Democratic Republic of the Congo. Its natural habitats are subtropical or tropical moist lowland forest and subtropical or tropical moist montane forest. It is threatened by habitat loss.
