= Syngamia latimarginalis =

Scientific classification
- Kingdom: Animalia
- Phylum: Arthropoda
- Class: Insecta
- Order: Lepidoptera
- Family: Crambidae
- Genus: Syngamia
- Species: S. latimarginalis

Binomial name
- Syngamia latimarginalis (Walker, 1859)

Synonyms
- Asopia latimarginalis Walker, 1859; Botys jucundalis Lederer, 1863; Orphanostigma versicolor Warren, 1896

Species of moth

Syngamia latimarginalis is a moth in the family Crambidae. It was described by Francis Walker in 1859. It is found in Sri Lanka, India, Myanmar, Indonesia (Java), Taiwan, the Democratic Republic of the Congo (Katanga), Equatorial Guinea, Kenya and Mozambique.
