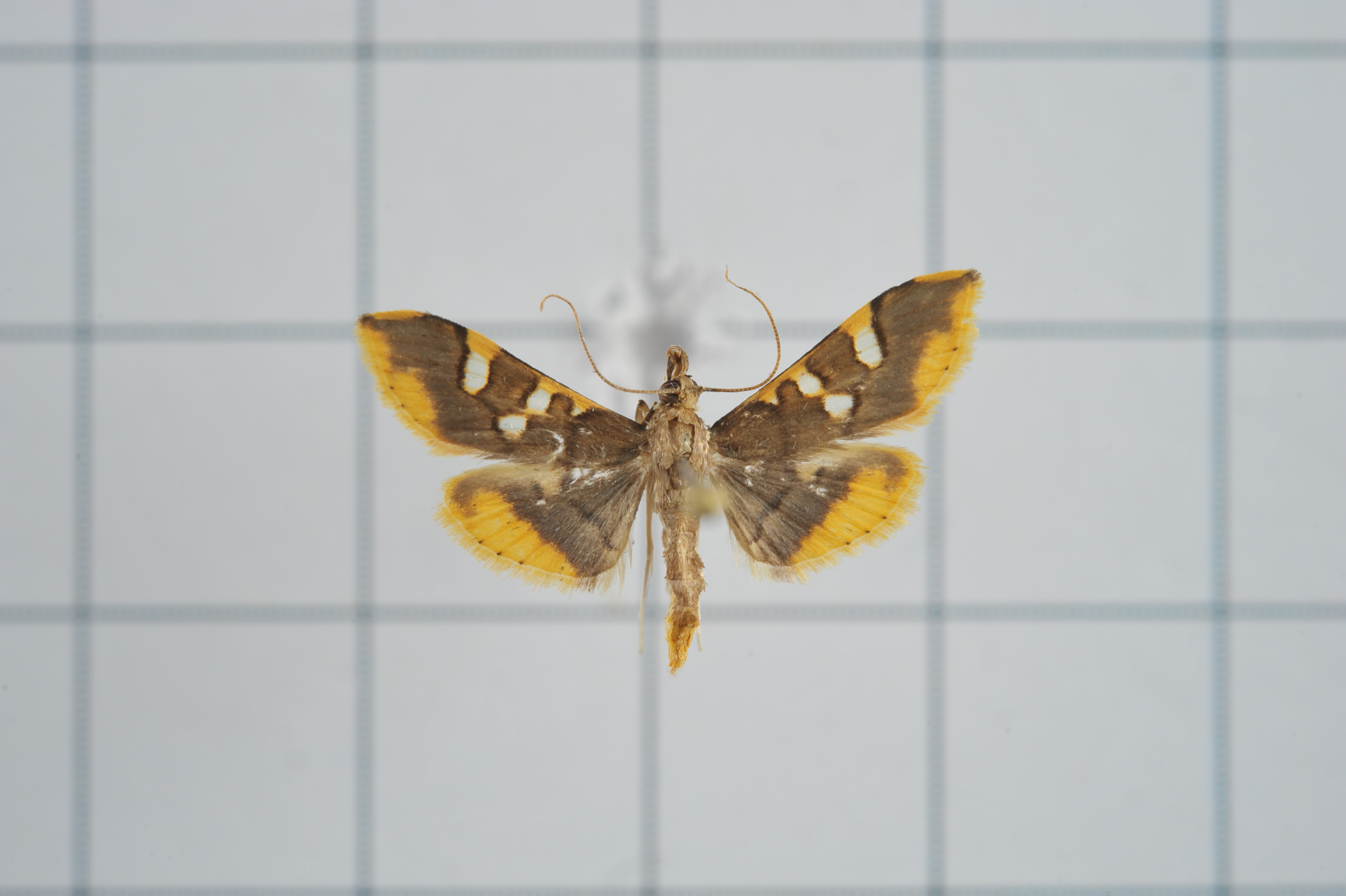

Scientific classification
- Kingdom: Animalia
- Phylum: Arthropoda
- Class: Insecta
- Order: Lepidoptera
- Family: Crambidae
- Genus: Prophantis
- Species: P. adusta

Binomial name
- Prophantis adusta Inoue, 1986

= Prophantis adusta =

Species of moth

Prophantis adusta is a moth in the family of Crambidae. It was first described by Hiroshi Inoue in 1986. It is found in India, China, Japan, Taiwan, Papua New Guinea and Australia, where it has been recorded from Queensland.
