= Triclisia =

Scientific classification
- Kingdom: Plantae
- Clade: Tracheophytes
- Clade: Angiosperms
- Clade: Eudicots
- Order: Ranunculales
- Family: Menispermaceae
- Genus: Triclisia; Benth.

Genus of flowering plants

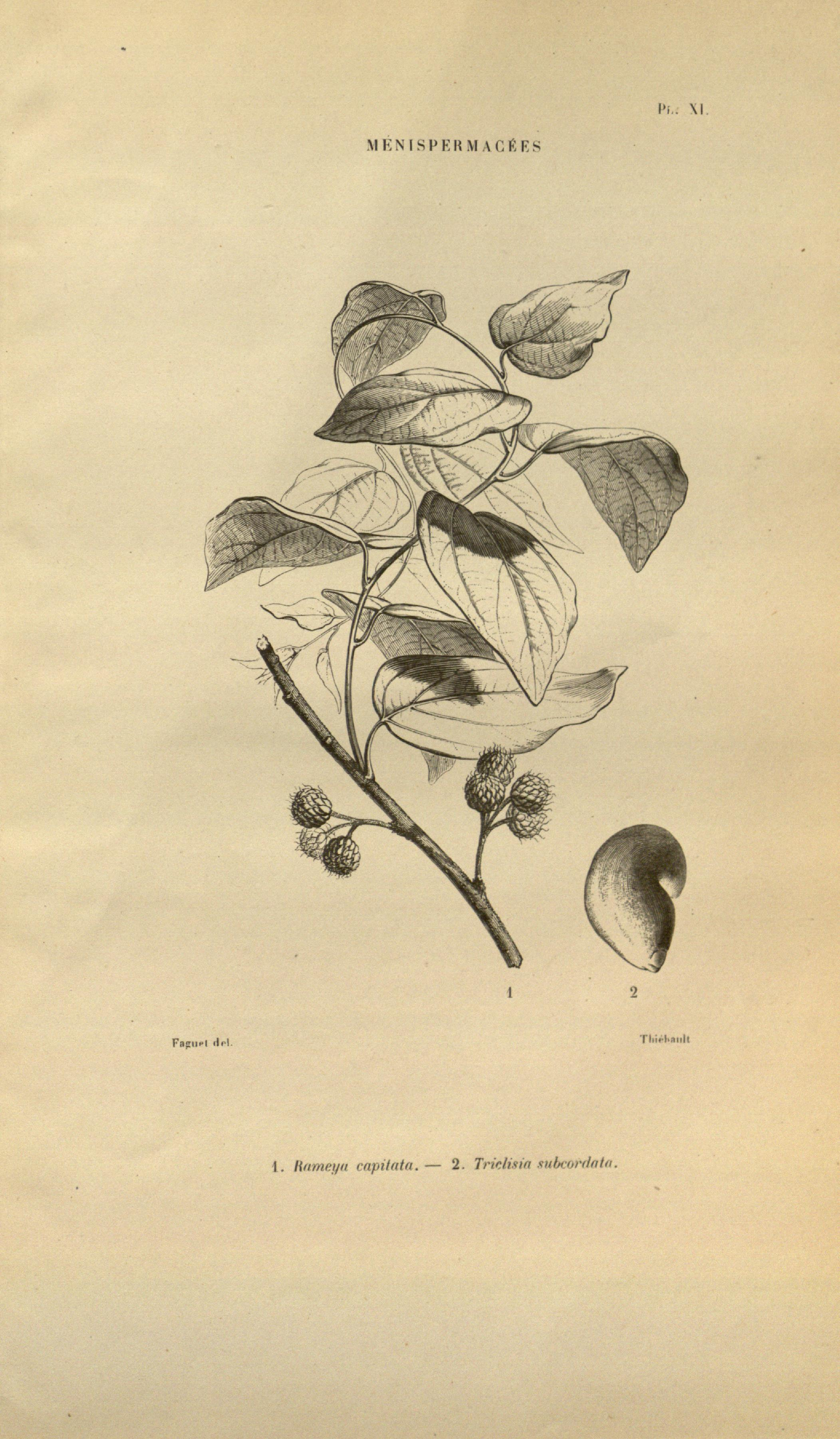

Triclisia is a genus of flowering plants in the family Menispermaceae. It is native to tropical Africa.

Species include:

- Triclisia angolensis
- Triclisia angustifolia
- Triclisia calopicrosia
- Triclisia capitata
- Triclisia coriacea
- Triclisia dictyophylla
- Triclisia dielsii
- Triclisia flava
- Triclisia gilletii
- Triclisia hypochrysea
- Triclisia jumelliana
- Triclisia lanceolata
- Triclisia loucoubensis
- Triclisia louisii
- Triclisia lucida
- Triclisia macrocarpa
- Triclisia macrophylla
- Triclisia patens
- Triclisia riparia
- Triclisia sacleuxii
- Triclisia semnophylla
- Triclisia subcordata
- Triclisia welwitschii
