= Bacotoma poecilura =

Scientific classification
- Domain: Eukaryota
- Kingdom: Animalia
- Phylum: Arthropoda
- Class: Insecta
- Order: Lepidoptera
- Family: Crambidae
- Subfamily: Spilomelinae
- Genus: Bacotoma
- Species: B. poecilura

Binomial name
- Bacotoma poecilura (E. Hering, 1903)

Synonyms
- Platamonia poecilura E. Hering, 1903

Species of moth

Bacotoma poecilura is a moth in the subfamily Spilomelinae of the family Crambidae. It was described by Hering in 1903. It is found in Indonesia (Java) and on Borneo.
