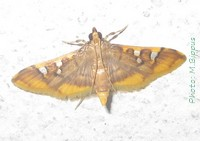

Scientific classification
- Domain: Eukaryota
- Kingdom: Animalia
- Phylum: Arthropoda
- Class: Insecta
- Order: Lepidoptera
- Family: Crambidae
- Genus: Prophantis
- Species: P. smaragdina

Binomial name
- Prophantis smaragdina (Butler, 1875)

Synonyms
- Pyralis smaragdina Butler, 1875; Cotachena smaragdina

= Prophantis smaragdina =

Species of moth

Prophantis smaragdina is a species of moth of the family Crambidae described by Arthur Gardiner Butler in 1875. It is found in subtropical Africa south of the Sahara.

== Food plants ==
The larvae of this species infest coffee beans. Known food plants of this species are: Rubiaceae (Coffea arabica, Ixora coccinea and Gardenia sp.), Verbenaceae (Duranta plumieri), and Menispermaceae (Triclisia sp.).
