= Bacotoma ptochura =

Scientific classification
- Domain: Eukaryota
- Kingdom: Animalia
- Phylum: Arthropoda
- Class: Insecta
- Order: Lepidoptera
- Family: Crambidae
- Subfamily: Spilomelinae
- Genus: Bacotoma
- Species: B. ptochura

Binomial name
- Bacotoma ptochura (Meyrick, 1894)

Synonyms
- Platamonia ptochura Meyrick, 1894

Species of moth

Bacotoma ptochura is a moth in the subfamily Spilomelinae of the family Crambidae. It was described by Edward Meyrick in 1894. It is found on Borneo.
