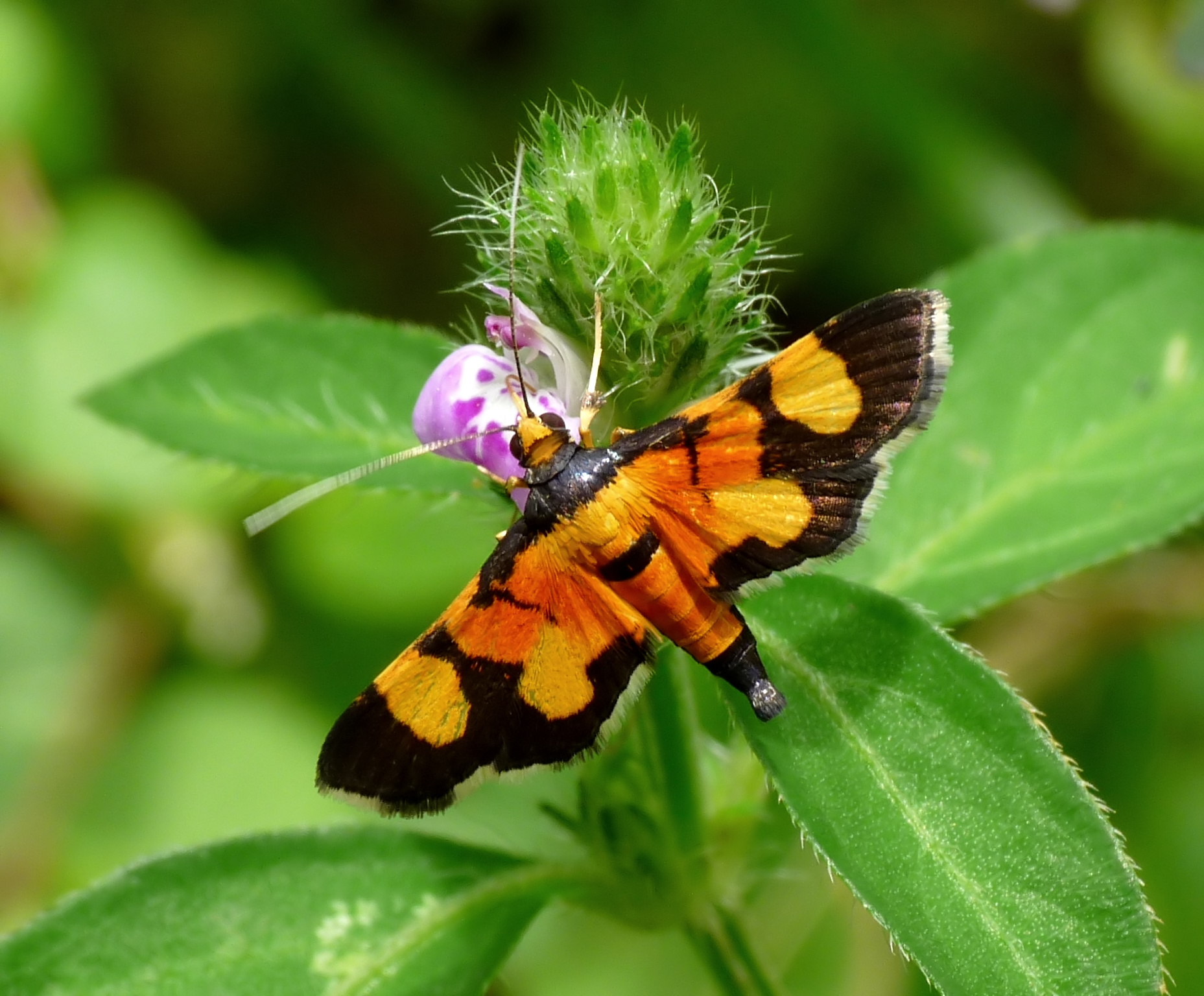

Scientific classification
- Kingdom: Animalia
- Phylum: Arthropoda
- Class: Insecta
- Order: Lepidoptera
- Family: Crambidae
- Subfamily: Spilomelinae
- Genus: Aethaloessa
- Species: A. calidalis

Binomial name
- Aethaloessa calidalis (Guenée, 1854)

Synonyms
- Glyphodes calidalis Guenée, 1854; Botys witialis C. Felder, R. Felder & Rogenhofer, 1875; Hyalea fulvidalis Wallengren, 1860; Syngamia aurantiaca Hampson, 1912; Syngamia octavialis Walker, 1859; Syngamia secutalis Walker, 1866; Syngamia tiphalis Walker, 1859

= Aethaloessa calidalis =

Species of moth

Aethaloessa calidalis is a moth of the family Crambidae described by Achille Guenée in 1854. It is found throughout the Seychelles, South and South-East Asia, Australia and on many Pacific islands.

This moth figured on an 8-cent stamp of Tuvalu in 1980.
