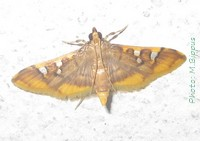
- Prophantis smaragdina

Scientific classification
- Domain: Eukaryota
- Kingdom: Animalia
- Phylum: Arthropoda
- Class: Insecta
- Order: Lepidoptera
- Family: Crambidae
- Subfamily: Spilomelinae
- Genus: Prophantis; Warren, 1896

= Prophantis =

Genus of moths

Prophantis is a genus of moths of the family Crambidae.

== Species ==
- Prophantis adusta Inoue, 1986 (from Australia, India, New Guinea, New Hebrides, Philippines, Timor, Taiwan)
- Prophantis androstigmata (Hampson, 1918) (from Australia and New Guinea)
- Prophantis coenostolalis (Hampson, 1899) (from Sierra Leone)
- Prophantis longicornalis (Mabille, 1900) (from Madagascar)
- Prophantis octoguttalis (C. Felder, R. Felder & Rogenhofer, 1875) (from Indonesia)
- Prophantis smaragdina (Butler, 1875) (from South Africa)
- Prophantis triplagalis Warren, 1996 (from India)
- Prophantis xanthomeralis (Hampson, 1918) (from Malawi)
