= Agrionympha pseliacma =

Scientific classification
- Domain: Eukaryota
- Kingdom: Animalia
- Phylum: Arthropoda
- Class: Insecta
- Order: Lepidoptera
- Family: Micropterigidae
- Genus: Agrionympha
- Species: A. pseliacma

Binomial name
- Agrionympha pseliacma Meyrick, 1921

Moth species in family Micropterigidae

Agrionympha pseliacma is a species of moth belonging to the family Micropterigidae. It was described by Edward Meyrick in 1921. It is found in South Africa, where it is known only from Karkloof Falls in KwaZulu-Natal.

It has been recorded in the shade of very high trees with little patches of sunshine in the entrance to a kloof.

The length of the forewings is about 3 mm for males and about 3.4 mm for females.
