= Cotachena nepalensis =

Scientific classification
- Domain: Eukaryota
- Kingdom: Animalia
- Phylum: Arthropoda
- Class: Insecta
- Order: Lepidoptera
- Family: Crambidae
- Subfamily: Spilomelinae
- Genus: Cotachena
- Species: C. nepalensis

Binomial name
- Cotachena nepalensis Yamanaka, 2000

Species of moth

Cotachena nepalensis is a moth in the family Crambidae. It was described by Hiroshi Yamanaka in 2000. It is found in Nepal.
