= Bacotoma ampliatalis =

Scientific classification
- Kingdom: Animalia
- Phylum: Arthropoda
- Clade: Pancrustacea
- Class: Insecta
- Order: Lepidoptera
- Family: Crambidae
- Subfamily: Spilomelinae
- Genus: Bacotoma
- Species: B. ampliatalis

Binomial name
- Bacotoma ampliatalis (Lederer, 1863)

Synonyms
- Platamonia ampliatalis Lederer, 1863

Species of moth

Bacotoma ampliatalis is a moth in the family Crambidae. It was described by Julius Lederer in 1863. It is found in Indonesia (Ambon Island).
