= Nepalese rock gecko =

Scientific classification
- Domain: Eukaryota
- Kingdom: Animalia
- Phylum: Chordata
- Class: Reptilia
- Order: Squamata
- Infraorder: Gekkota
- Family: Gekkonidae
- Genus: Cyrtodactylus
- Species: C. nepalensis

Binomial name
- Cyrtodactylus nepalensis (Schleich & Kästle 1998)

Synonyms
- Cyrtopodion nepalensis (Rösler 2000); Gonydactylus nepalensis (Schleich & Kästle 1998); Siwaligekko nepalensis (Khan 2003)

Species of lizard

Cyrtodactylus nepalensis is a bent-toed gecko species first described by Schleich & Kästle in 1998. It is endemic to western Nepal.
