= Paul E.S. Whalley =

British entomologist

Dr Paul Ernst Sutton Whalley
- Born: Paul Ernest Sutton Whalley; 1930
- Died: 17 September 2019 (aged 88–89); Bermondsey, London, England
- Citizenship: British
- Education: University College of North Wales, Bangor
- Known for: Research on global Lepidoptera (moths and butterflies); author of "Pond & River"
- Spouse: Elsie Mary Pepper (m. 1955)
- Children: Peter Whalley; Alyson Whalley
- Father: Ernest Arthur Whalley
- Relatives: Joyce Irene Whalley (sister)
- Scientific career
- Fields: Entomology, Lepidopterology, Taxonomy
- Workplaces: Natural History Museum, London
- Author abbrev. (zoology): Whalley

Paul E. S. Whalley (1930 - 2019) was a British entomologist. He worked at the Natural History Museum and during his lifetime he described over 280 taxa, including those from Africa, Asia and the Solomon Islands. Five entomology books were published in his name, he was a radio broadcaster, advisor and natural history consultant for BBC television.

== Early life and education ==
Paul Ernest Sutton Whalley was born in 1930. He was the son of Ernest Arthur Whalley, a senior official with the Inland Revenue, and the brother of the prominent author and curator Joyce Irene Whalley. During his youth, the family resided at "Claremont" on Bryn Lupus Road in Deganwy, near Llandudno, North Wales. Whalley developed a keen interest in natural history from a young age; at fourteen, he began compiling detailed, illustrated nature diaries recording local wildlife and bird populations around the Creuddyn Peninsula His earliest entries focused strictly on the fauna and flora of the Creuddyn Peninsula, including the micro-habitats surrounding Llandudno and Deganwy., a practice he maintained throughout his life.

Following the conclusion of World War II, Whalley matriculated at the University College of North Wales, Bangor (now Bangor University). As an undergraduate, he co-founded the Bangor Bird Group alongside fellow students to scientifically track and map local avian populations across Anglesey. He graduated with a Bachelor of Science (BSc) Joint Honours degree in Zoology and Entomology, distinguishing himself by earning First Class Honours.

Although later universally styled as "Dr Whalley", he did not pursue a traditional PhD student thesis at Bangor. Instead, his academic credentials secured him an immediate three-year appointment as a colonial research entomologist for the British government in Uganda. He was later awarded a higher Doctorate of Science (DSc) degree based on the merit of his extensive, lifelong published portfolio of taxonomic research on global Lepidoptera.

== Death and Legacy ==
Throughout his life, Paul Whalley meticulously recorded the natural history around him. His diaries are now held by Bangor University Archives and Special Collections. The following video link provides and insight into the man and his diaries, compiled between 1944 and 2000. Sadly, he lost his sight and passed away in a nursing home, September 2019.

== Works ==
=== Books ===
- Whalley, Paul E. S. (1976). Tropical Leaf Moths: A Monograph of the Subfamily Striglinae (Lepidoptera; Thyrididae). London: British Museum (Natural History). ISBN 978-0-565-00782-9.
- Whalley, Paul E. S. (1979). Butterflies. London: Mitchell Beazley. ISBN 978-0-855-33188-7.
- Whalley, Paul E. S. (1980). Butterfly Watching. London: Severn House. ISBN 978-0-727-82002-0.
- Whalley, Paul E. S. (1981). The Mitchell Beazley Pocket Guide to Butterflies. London: Mitchell Beazley. ISBN 978-0-855-33348-5.
- Whalley, Paul E. S. (1988). Butterfly & Moth. DK Eyewitness Books. London: Dorling Kindersley. ISBN 978-0-863-18319-5.

=== Radio ===
- Whalley, Paul E. S. (23 July 1961). "The Naturalist: Butterflies and Migrant Insects". BBC Home Service. BBC.
- Whalley, Paul E. S. (15 August 1972). "The Living World: Moths and the Midnight Candle". BBC Radio 4. BBC.
- Whalley, Paul E. S. (4 June 1978). "The Living World: The Ecology of Chalk Downs". BBC Radio 4. BBC.
- Whalley, Paul E. S. (9 November 1983). "Science Now: Fossil Insects and Amber". BBC Radio 4. BBC.

=== Television ===
- Dr Paul E. S. Whalley (Scientific Adviser) (14 September 1975). "The Private Life of the Cabbage White". The Private Lives of Animals. BBC Two.
- Dr Paul Whalley (Expert Guest Commentator) (3 May 1981). "Flight of the Monarch". The World About Us. BBC Two.

== Names published ==
- Archaeolepis

See Category:Taxa named by Paul E.S. Whalley

== Eponymous taxa ==
- Aglaopus whalleyi Konvicka, Spitzer & Jaros, 1998

== Publications ==
(incomplete)
