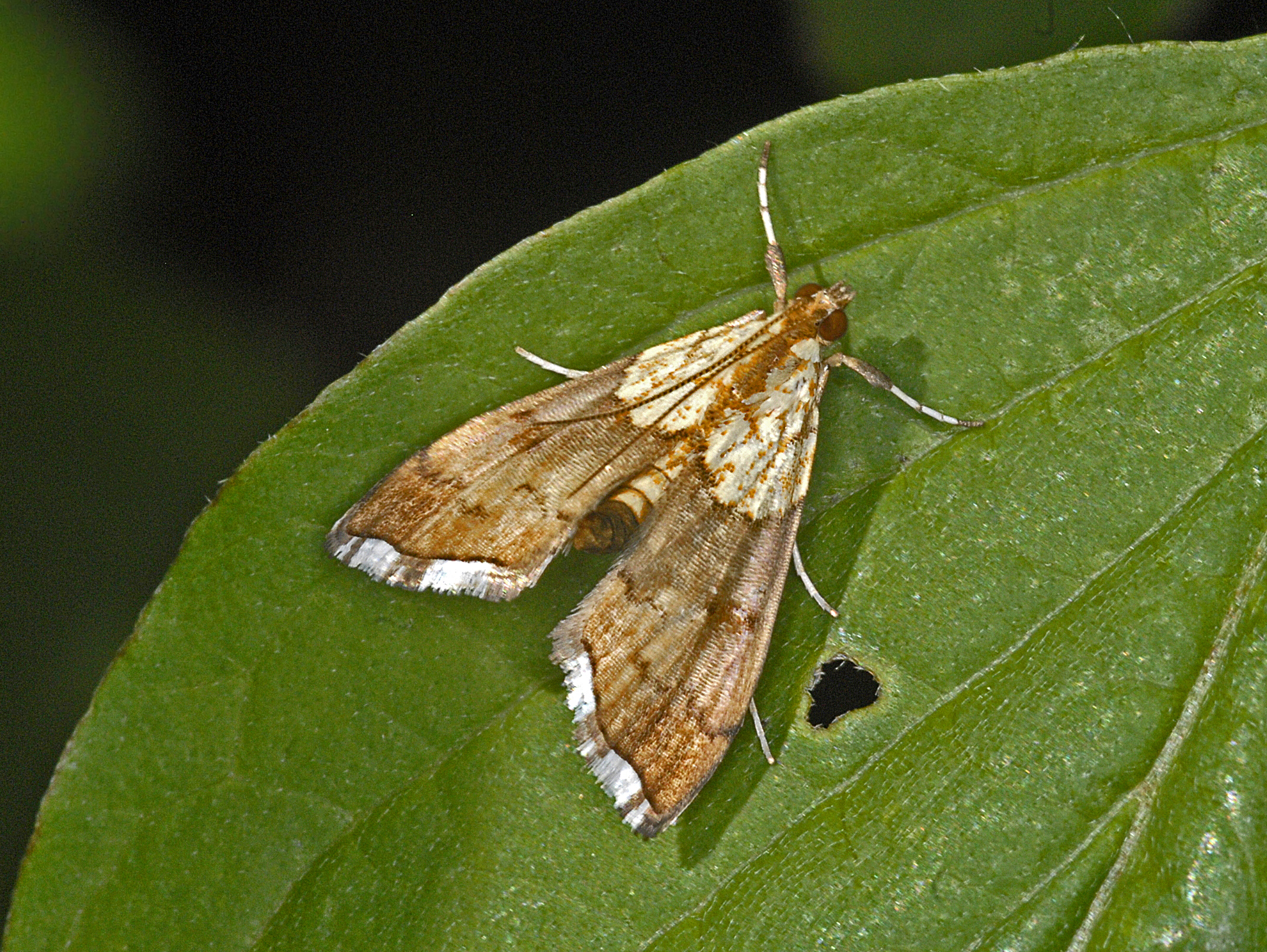
- A live individual of Agrotera nemoralis

Scientific classification
- Kingdom: Animalia
- Phylum: Arthropoda
- Clade: Pancrustacea
- Class: Insecta
- Order: Lepidoptera
- Family: Crambidae
- Tribe: Agroterini
- Genus: Agrotera; Schrank, 1802

Synonyms
- Agroptera Hampson, 1899

= Agrotera (moth) =

Genus of moths

Agrotera is a genus of snout moths in the subfamily Spilomelinae of the family Crambidae. It is the type genus of the tribe Agroterini and currently comprises 28 species distributed in the Afrotropical, Palearctic, Indomalayan and Australasian realm.

The caterpillars of Agrotera species feed on a variety of plants in the families Anacardiaceae, Betulaceae, Dipterocarpaceae, Fagaceae, Lythraceae, Melastomataceae, Myrtaceae and Rubiaceae.

The genera Leucinodella, Nistra, Sagariphora and Tetracona have been treated as synonyms of Agrotera in the past, but a recent taxonomic revision found them to be valid genera.

== Species ==
- Agrotera aculeata Liu, Qi & Wang, 2020 - Hainan
- Agrotera albalis Maes, 2003 - Príncipe
- Agrotera atalis Viette, 1958 - Madagascar
- Agrotera barcealis (Walker, 1859) - Sri Lanka, Borneo and West Papua
- Agrotera basinotata Hampson, 1891 - Tamil Nadu
- Agrotera citrina Hampson, 1899 - Ghana
- Agrotera dentata Liu, Qi & Wang, 2020 - Hainan
- Agrotera discinotata Swinhoe, 1894 - Meghalaya
- Agrotera effertalis (Walker, 1859) - Sri Lanka
- Agrotera endoxantha Hampson, 1899 - New Guinea
- Agrotera flavobasalis Inoue, 1996 - Bonin Islands
- Agrotera fumosa Hampson, 1899 - Ghana
- Agrotera genuflexa Chen, Horak, Du & Zhang, 2017 - Queensland
- Agrotera glycyphanes Turner, 1913 - Northern Australia
- Agrotera ignepicta Hampson, 1899 - Queensland
- Agrotera ignepictoides Rothschild, 1916 - Papua
- Agrotera lienpingialis Caradja, 1925 - China
- Agrotera longitabulata Chen, Horak, Du & Zhang, 2017 - Queensland
- Agrotera mysolalis (Walker, 1866) - West Papua
- Agrotera namorokalis Marion & Viette, 1956 - Madagascar
- Agrotera nemoralis (Scopoli, 1763) - Eurasia
- Agrotera ornata Wileman & South, 1917 - Taiwan
- Agrotera protensa Liu, Qi & Wang, 2020 - Hainan
- Agrotera robustispina Lu, Qi & Wang, 2020 - Hainan
- Agrotera rufitinctalis Hampson, 1917 - Malawi
- Agrotera scissalis (Walker, 1866 - Java
- Agrotera semipictalis Kenrick, 1907 - Papua New Guinea
- Agrotera setipes Hampson, 1899 - Natuna Islands

== Former species ==
- Agrotera amathealis (Walker, 1859) - transferred to Tetracona amathealis (Walker, 1859)
- Agrotera coelatalis (Walker, 1859) - transferred to Nistra coelatalis Walker, 1859
- Agrotera leucostola Hampson, 1896 - transferred to Leucinodella leucostola (Hampson, 1896)
- Agrotera magnificalis Hampson, 1893 - transferred to Sagariphora magnificalis (Hampson, 1893)
- Agrotera pictalis (Warren, 1896) - transferred to Tetracona pictalis Warren, 1896
