= Sagariphora =

Scientific classification
- Domain: Eukaryota
- Kingdom: Animalia
- Phylum: Arthropoda
- Class: Insecta
- Order: Lepidoptera
- Family: Crambidae
- Subfamily: Spilomelinae
- Genus: Sagariphora; Meyrick, 1894

Species of moth

Sagariphora is a genus of snout moths in the family Crambidae. It is monotypic, being represented by the single species Sagariphora magnificalis, which was formerly included in the genus Agrotera.

Sagariphora magnificalis was described by George Hampson in 1893 from specimens collected in Pundaloya, Sri Lanka. Its junior synonym Sagariphora heliochlaena Meyrick, 1894 (the type species of Sagariphora) was described from Sumbawa in Indonesia.
