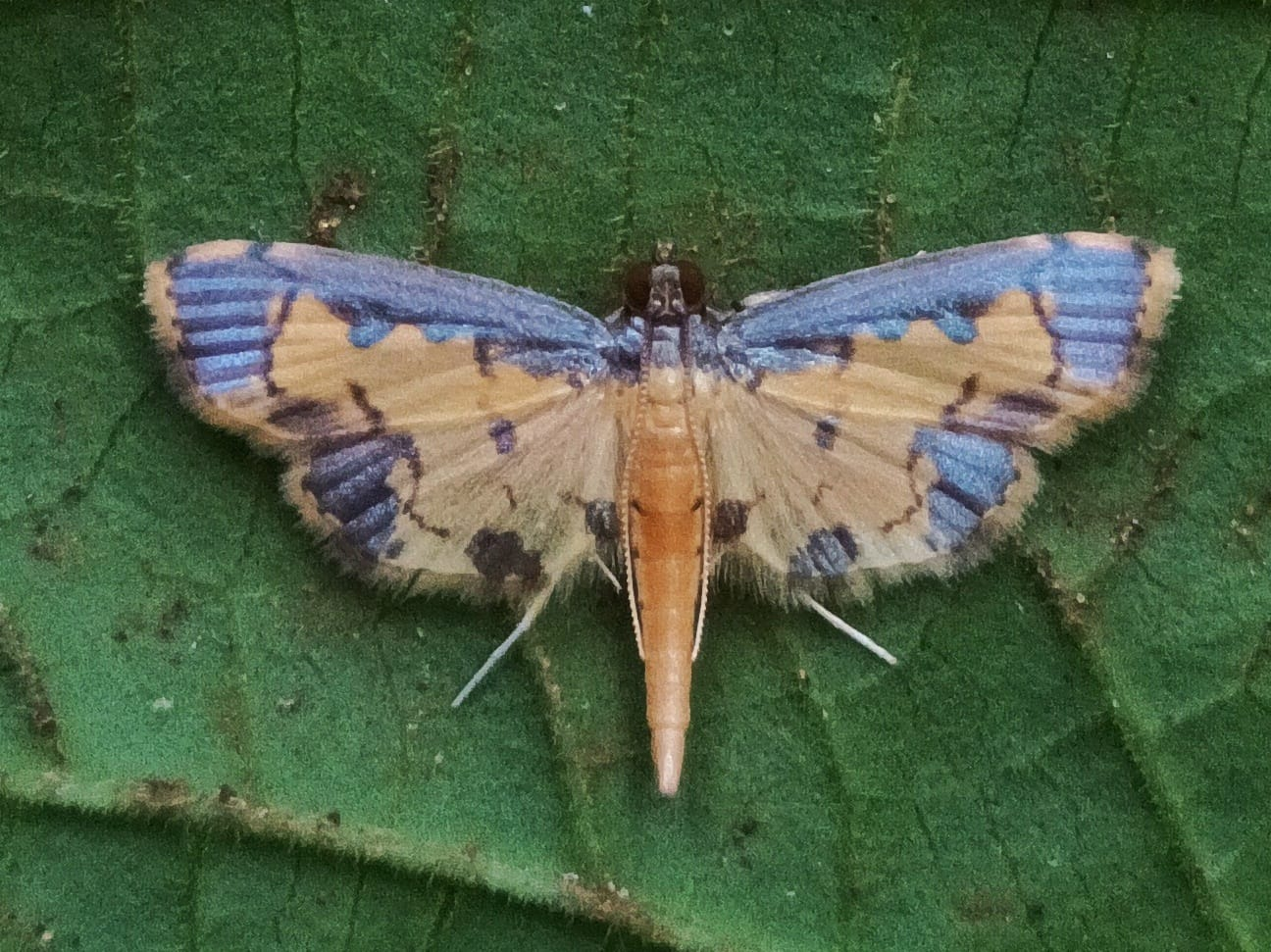

Scientific classification
- Kingdom: Animalia
- Phylum: Arthropoda
- Class: Insecta
- Order: Lepidoptera
- Family: Crambidae
- Subfamily: Spilomelinae
- Genus: Nistra; Walker, 1859
- Species: N. coelatalis

Binomial name
- Nistra coelatalis Walker, 1859

Synonyms
- Agrotera coelatalis (Walker, 1859); Agrotera proximalis (Walker, 1859); Botys proximalis Walker, 1859

= Nistra =

Nistra coelatalis

Species of moth

Nistra is a genus of snout moths in the family Crambidae. It is monotypic, being represented by the single species Nistra coelatalis, which was formerly included in the genus Agrotera.

Nistra coelatalis was described by Francis Walker in 1859. It is found in Sri Lanka, Sumatra, Borneo, Sumbawa and Sulawesi.

The wings are pale yellow with two brown lines. The forewings are partly brownish along the costa with a diffuse purplish tinge in the disc and metallic-purple at the base. The hindwings are metallic-purple at the tips and a metallic-purple patch on each side of the interior angle.
