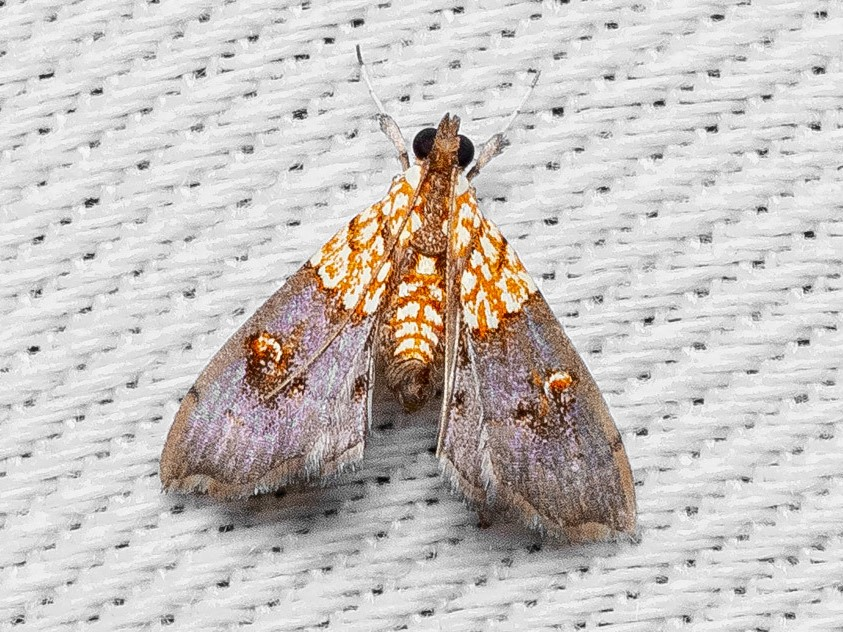

Scientific classification
- Kingdom: Animalia
- Phylum: Arthropoda
- Clade: Pancrustacea
- Class: Insecta
- Order: Lepidoptera
- Family: Crambidae
- Genus: Agrotera
- Species: A. lienpingialis

Binomial name
- Agrotera lienpingialis Caradja, 1925

= Agrotera lienpingialis =

Species of moth

Agrotera lienpingialis is a species of moth in the family Crambidae. It was described by Aristide Caradja in 1925. It is found in China.
