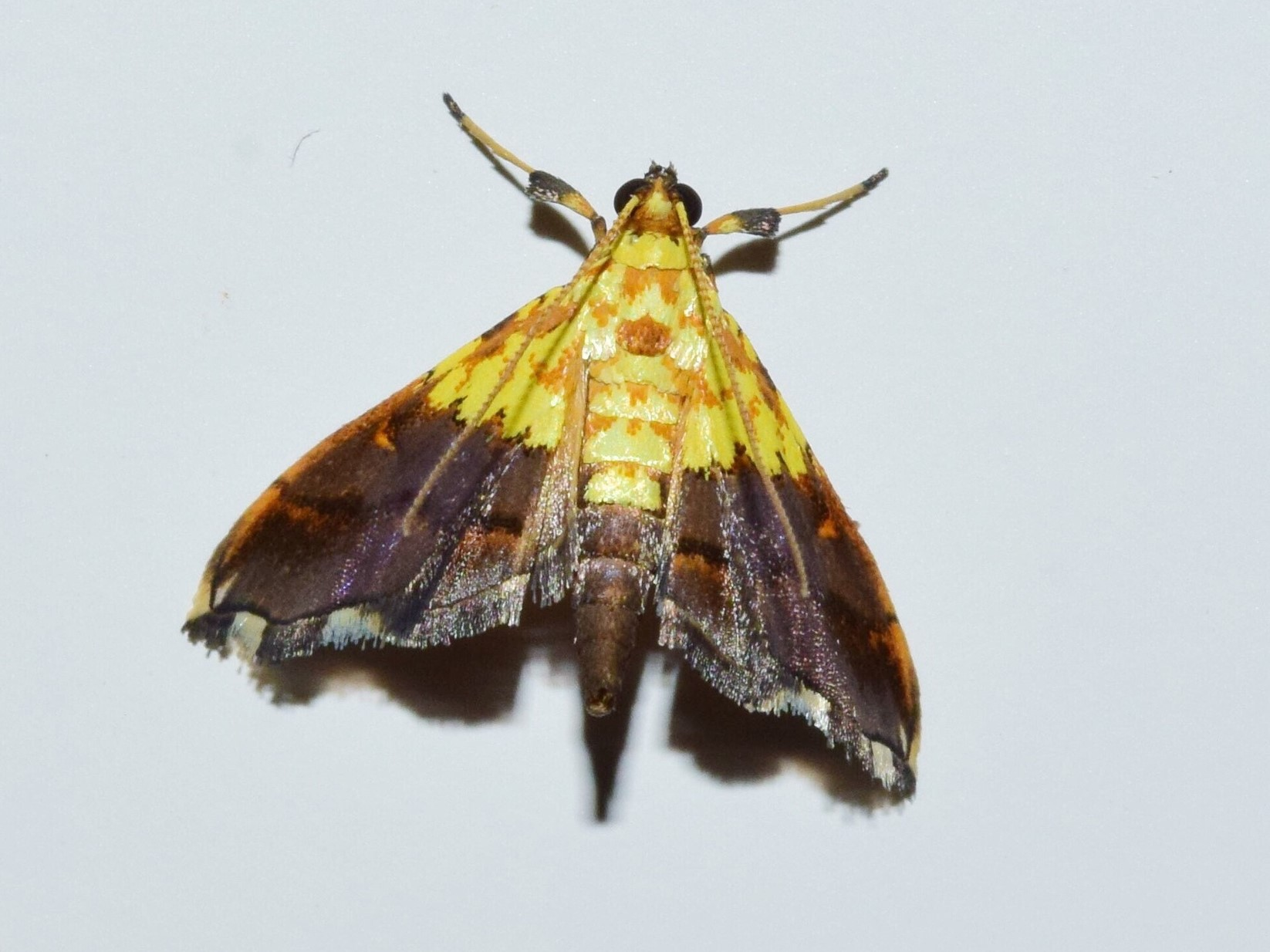

Scientific classification
- Kingdom: Animalia
- Phylum: Arthropoda
- Clade: Pancrustacea
- Class: Insecta
- Order: Lepidoptera
- Family: Crambidae
- Genus: Agrotera
- Species: A. citrina

Binomial name
- Agrotera citrina Hampson, 1899

= Agrotera citrina =

Species of moth

Agrotera citrina is a moth in the family Crambidae. It was described by George Hampson in 1899. It is found in Ghana.
