= Agrotera ignepictoides =

Scientific classification
- Kingdom: Animalia
- Phylum: Arthropoda
- Clade: Pancrustacea
- Class: Insecta
- Order: Lepidoptera
- Family: Crambidae
- Genus: Agrotera
- Species: A. ignepictoides

Binomial name
- Agrotera ignepictoides Rothschild, 1916

Species of moth

Agrotera ignepictoides is a moth in the family Crambidae. It was described by Rothschild in 1916. It is found in Papua New Guinea.

The wingspan is about 28 mm. The basal part of the forewings is yellow, spotted with scarlet. The remainder of the wing is pale cinnamon mauve washed with grey-brown at and near the apex. The basal and costal areas of the hindwings are cream, while the rest is pale cinnamon mauve. There is a postmedian row of small dots and the abdominal area is buff with an irregular longitudinal scarlet patch with a yellow dot beyond it.
