= Agrotera mysolalis =

Scientific classification
- Kingdom: Animalia
- Phylum: Arthropoda
- Clade: Pancrustacea
- Class: Insecta
- Order: Lepidoptera
- Family: Crambidae
- Genus: Agrotera
- Species: A. mysolalis

Binomial name
- Agrotera mysolalis (Walker, 1866)

Synonyms
- Aediodes mysolalis Walker, 1866

Species of moth

Agrotera mysolalis is a moth in the family Crambidae. It was described by Francis Walker in 1866. It is found on Misool in Indonesia.
