= Agrotera effertalis =

Scientific classification
- Kingdom: Animalia
- Phylum: Arthropoda
- Clade: Pancrustacea
- Class: Insecta
- Order: Lepidoptera
- Family: Crambidae
- Genus: Agrotera
- Species: A. effertalis

Binomial name
- Agrotera effertalis (Walker, 1859)

Synonyms
- Aediodes effertalis Walker, 1859

Species of moth

Agrotera effertalis is a moth in the family Crambidae. It was described by Francis Walker in 1859. It is found in Sri Lanka.
