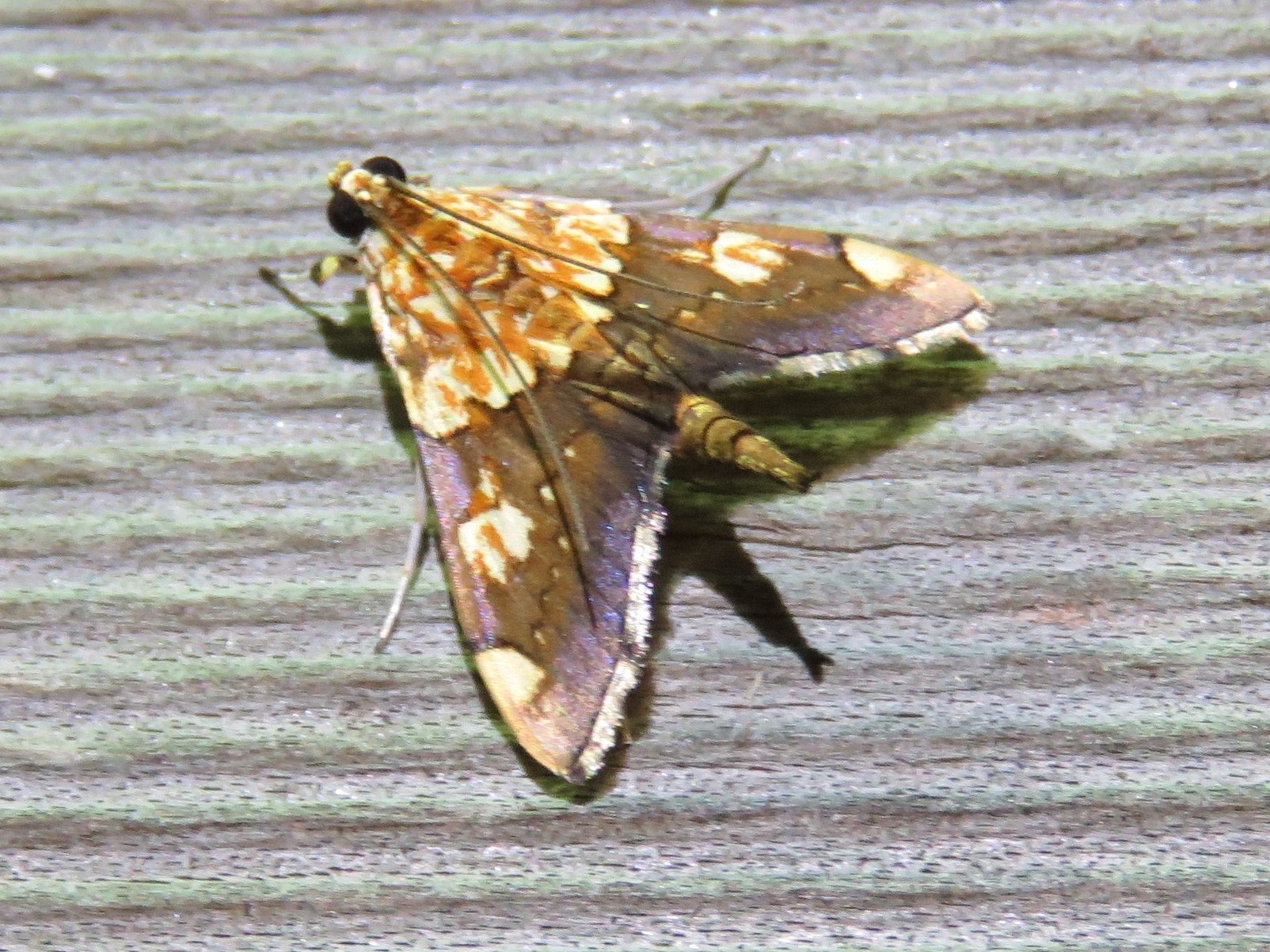

Scientific classification
- Kingdom: Animalia
- Phylum: Arthropoda
- Clade: Pancrustacea
- Class: Insecta
- Order: Lepidoptera
- Family: Crambidae
- Genus: Agrotera
- Species: A. namorokalis

Binomial name
- Agrotera namorokalis Marion & Viette, 1956

= Agrotera namorokalis =

Species of moth

Agrotera namorokalis is a species of moth in the family Crambidae. It was described by Hubert Marion and Pierre Viette in 1956. It is found on Madagascar.
