= Agrotera ignepicta =

Scientific classification
- Kingdom: Animalia
- Phylum: Arthropoda
- Clade: Pancrustacea
- Class: Insecta
- Order: Lepidoptera
- Family: Crambidae
- Genus: Agrotera
- Species: A. ignepicta

Binomial name
- Agrotera ignepicta Hampson, 1899

Species of moth

Agrotera ignepicta is a moth in the family Crambidae. It was described by George Hampson in 1899. It is found in Australia, where it has been recorded in Queensland.

The wingspan is about 26 mm. The basal area of the forewings is yellow, variegated with fiery red and with traces of a subbasal dark line and a waved antemedial line. There is a large yellow-and-red patch beyond the cell, defined by dark scales and with some diffuse brown with two red points. The inner area of the hindwings is yellow, variegated with red up to the postmedial line.
