= Agrotera rufitinctalis =

Scientific classification
- Kingdom: Animalia
- Phylum: Arthropoda
- Clade: Pancrustacea
- Class: Insecta
- Order: Lepidoptera
- Family: Crambidae
- Genus: Agrotera
- Species: A. rufitinctalis

Binomial name
- Agrotera rufitinctalis Hampson, 1917

Species of moth

Agrotera rufitinctalis is a moth in the family Crambidae. It was described by George Hampson in 1917. It is found in Malawi and Zimbabwe.
