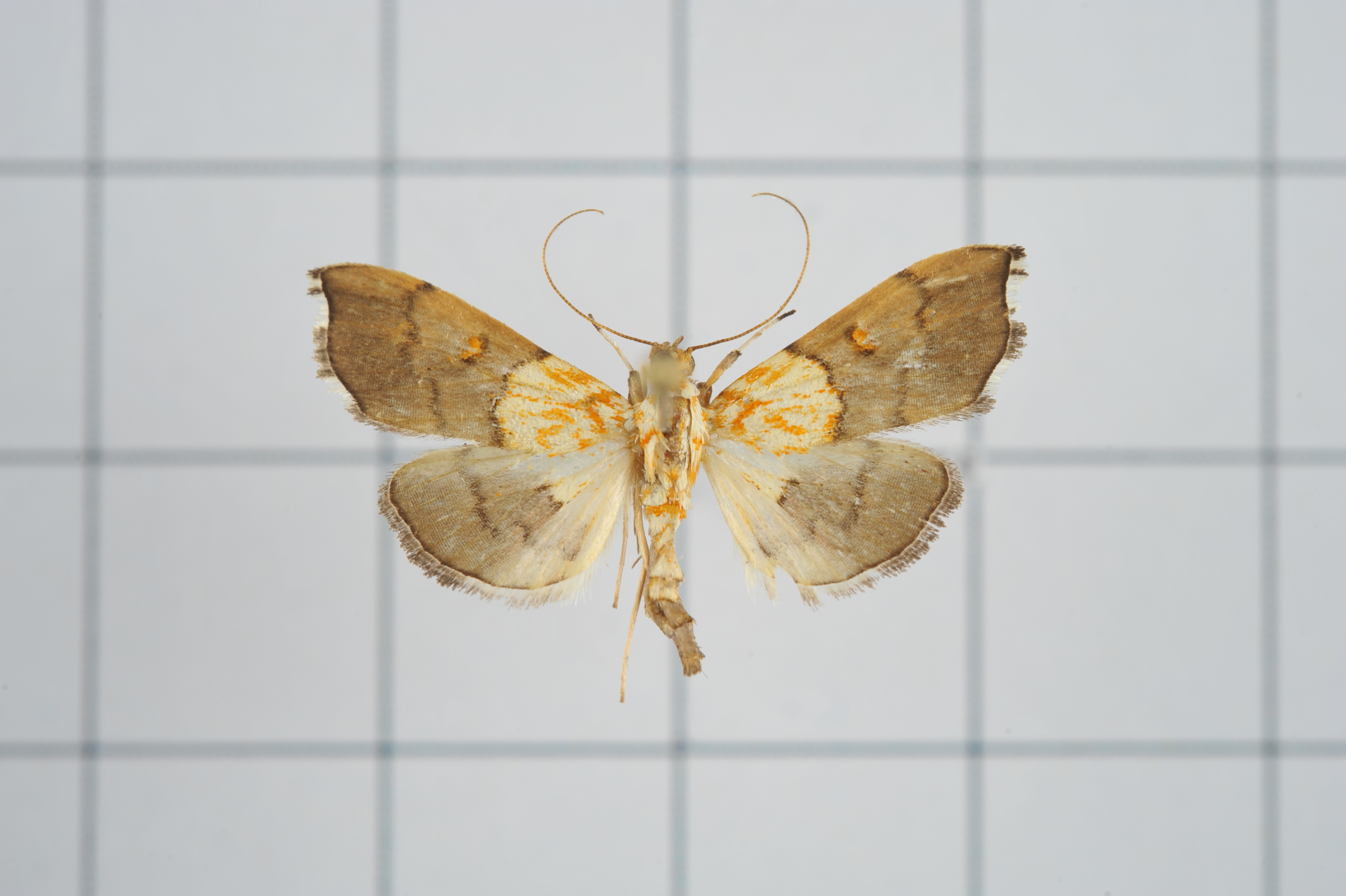

Scientific classification
- Kingdom: Animalia
- Phylum: Arthropoda
- Clade: Pancrustacea
- Class: Insecta
- Order: Lepidoptera
- Family: Crambidae
- Genus: Agrotera
- Species: A. discinotata

Binomial name
- Agrotera discinotata C. Swinhoe, 1894

Synonyms
- Agrotera griseola Warren, 1896

= Agrotera discinotata =

Species of moth

Agrotera discinotata is a moth in the family Crambidae. It was described by Charles Swinhoe in 1894. It is found in India.
