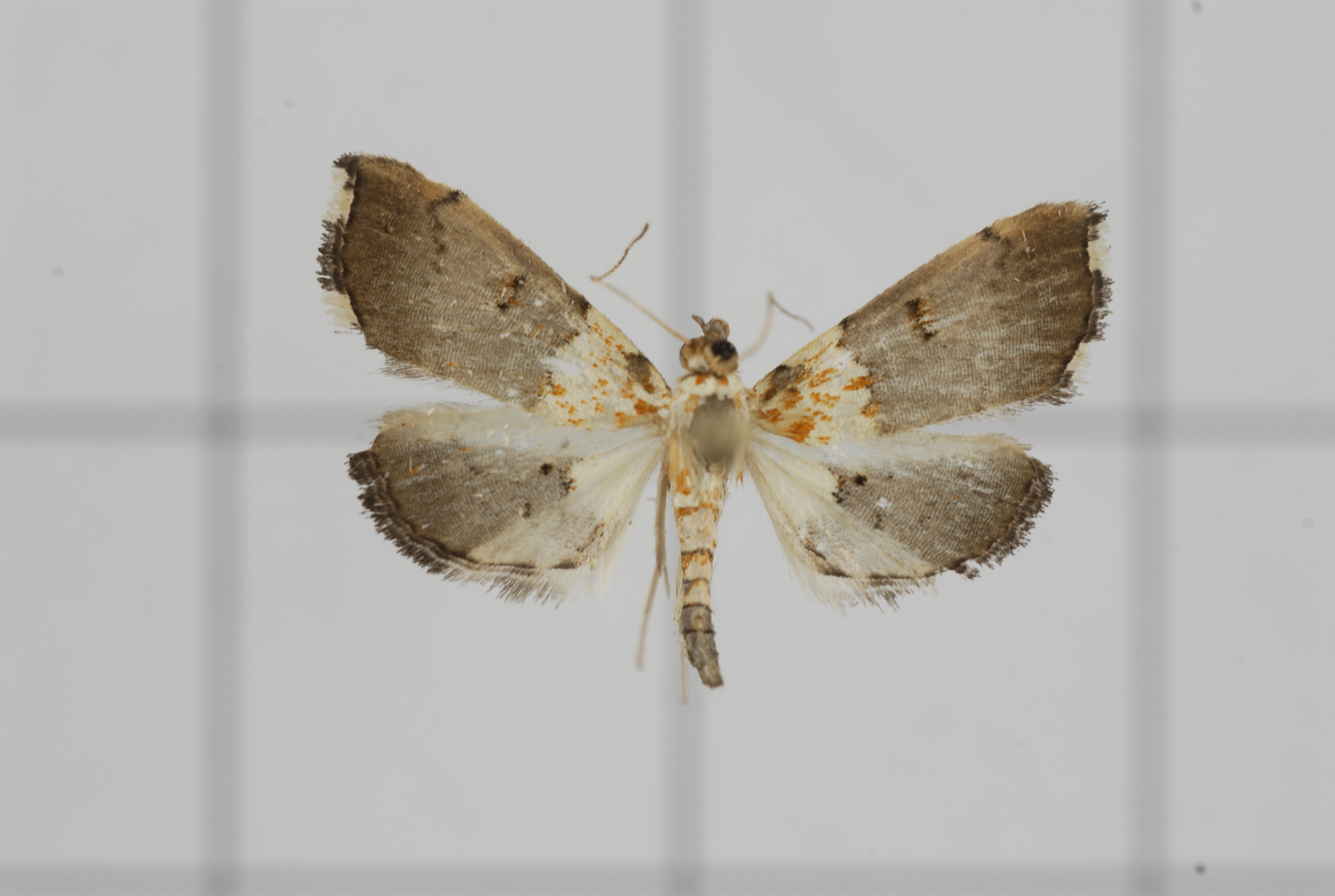

Scientific classification
- Kingdom: Animalia
- Phylum: Arthropoda
- Class: Insecta
- Order: Lepidoptera
- Family: Crambidae
- Genus: Agrotera
- Species: A. basinotata

Binomial name
- Agrotera basinotata Hampson, 1891

= Agrotera basinotata =

Species of moth

Agrotera basinotata is a moth of the family Crambidae described by George Hampson in 1891. It is native to Queensland, Thailand, Hong Kong and Japan, but was introduced to Hawaii for the control of Melastoma malabathricum.

The larvae feed on Melastoma malabathricum, but also Syzygium buxifolium.
