= Leucinodella =

Scientific classification
- Domain: Eukaryota
- Kingdom: Animalia
- Phylum: Arthropoda
- Class: Insecta
- Order: Lepidoptera
- Family: Crambidae
- Subfamily: Spilomelinae
- Genus: Leucinodella; Strand, 1918

Species of moth

Leucinodella is a genus of snout moths in the family Crambidae. It was formerly considered a junior synonym of the genus Agrotera.

== Species ==
- Leucinodella banthaensis Ko & Bae in Ko, Bayarsaikhan, Lee, Cha, Kim, Park, Kwon & Bae, 2020
- Leucinodella leucostola (Hampson, 1896)
