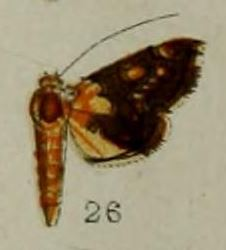

Scientific classification
- Kingdom: Animalia
- Phylum: Arthropoda
- Clade: Pancrustacea
- Class: Insecta
- Order: Lepidoptera
- Family: Crambidae
- Genus: Agrotera
- Species: A. endoxantha

Binomial name
- Agrotera endoxantha Hampson, 1898

= Agrotera endoxantha =

Species of moth

Agrotera endoxantha is a moth in the family Crambidae. It was described by George Hampson in 1898. It is found in New Guinea.

The wingspan is about 24 mm. The basal area of the forewings is spotted with orange red and there are traces of a black line on the outer edge. The remainder of the wing is dull purplish. The basal area and inner area of the hindwings are pale yellow and the apical third of the wing is purplish.
