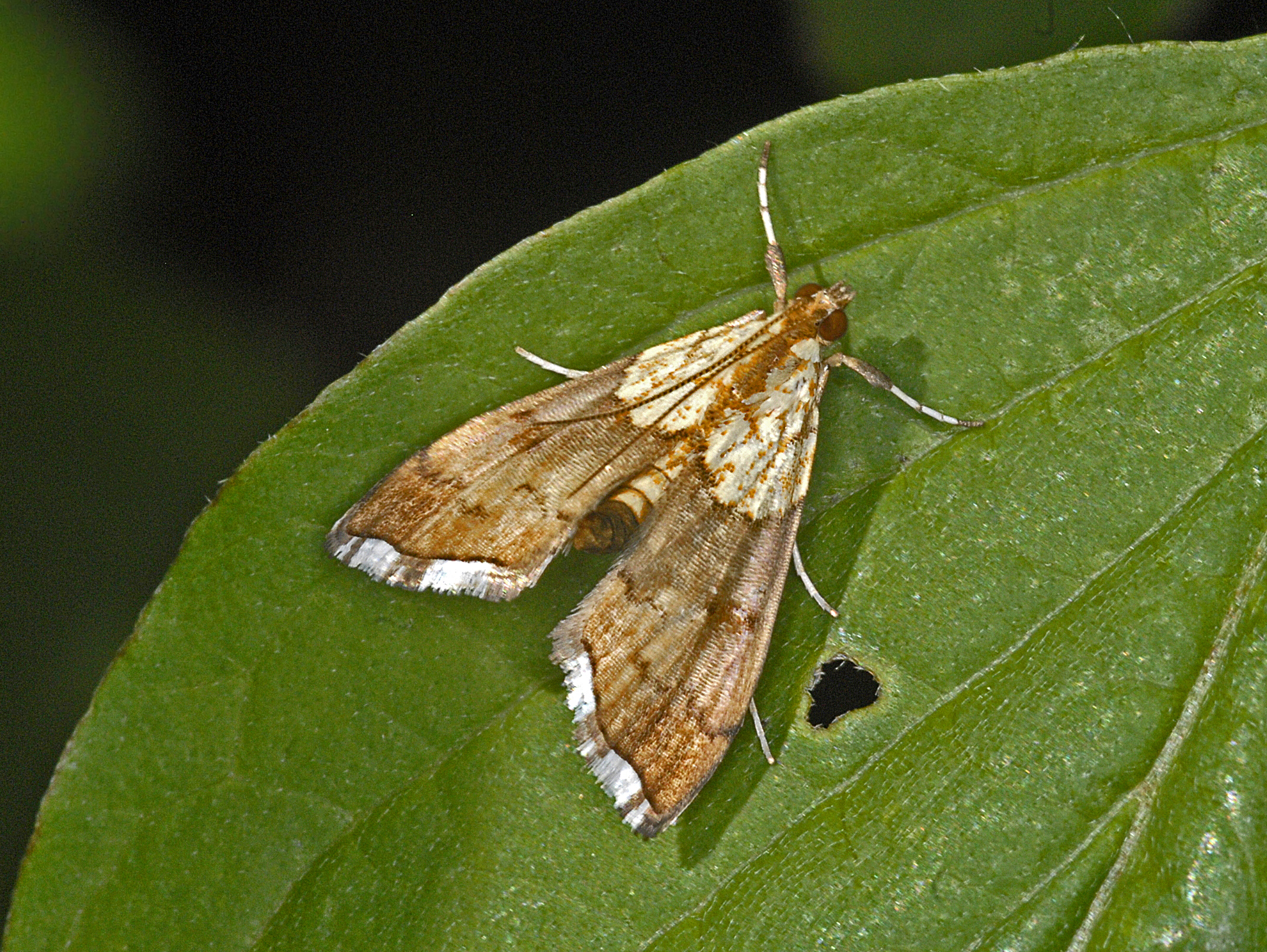

Scientific classification
- Kingdom: Animalia
- Phylum: Arthropoda
- Class: Insecta
- Order: Lepidoptera
- Family: Crambidae
- Genus: Agrotera
- Species: A. nemoralis

Binomial name
- Agrotera nemoralis (Scopoli, 1763)

Synonyms
- Phalaena nemoralis Scopoli, 1763; Agrotera posticalis Wileman, 1911; Phalaena erosalis Fabricius, 1794

= Agrotera nemoralis =

Species of moth

Agrotera nemoralis, the beautiful pearl, is a species of moth of the family Crambidae. It was first described by Giovanni Antonio Scopoli in his 1763 Entomologia Carniolica.

== Taxonomy ==
The rather similar Agrotera posticalis, described from Japan, instead of a synonym is often treated as a valid species.

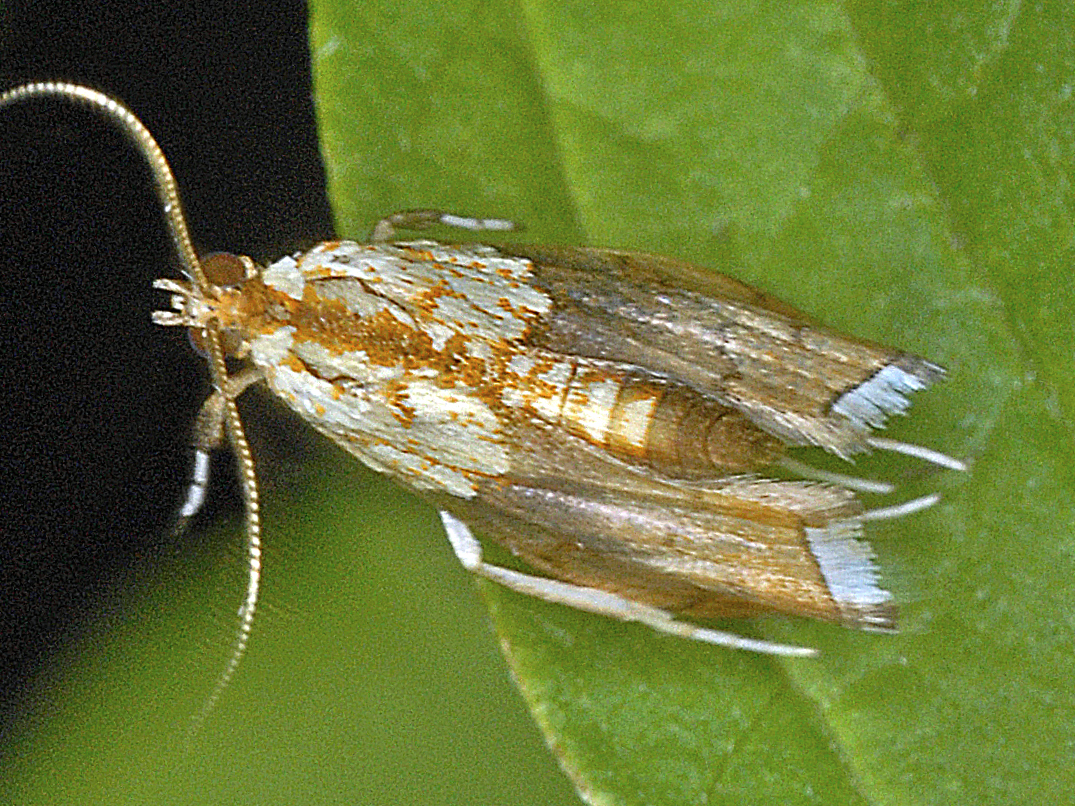

== Distribution ==
This widespread species can be found from Europe to India, China and Japan.

== Description ==
The wingspan of Agrotera nemoralis can reach 20–24 mm. Forewings are brown with an orange reniform spot and a clear band with an irregular post median line. Wing fringes are white with irregular brown bands.

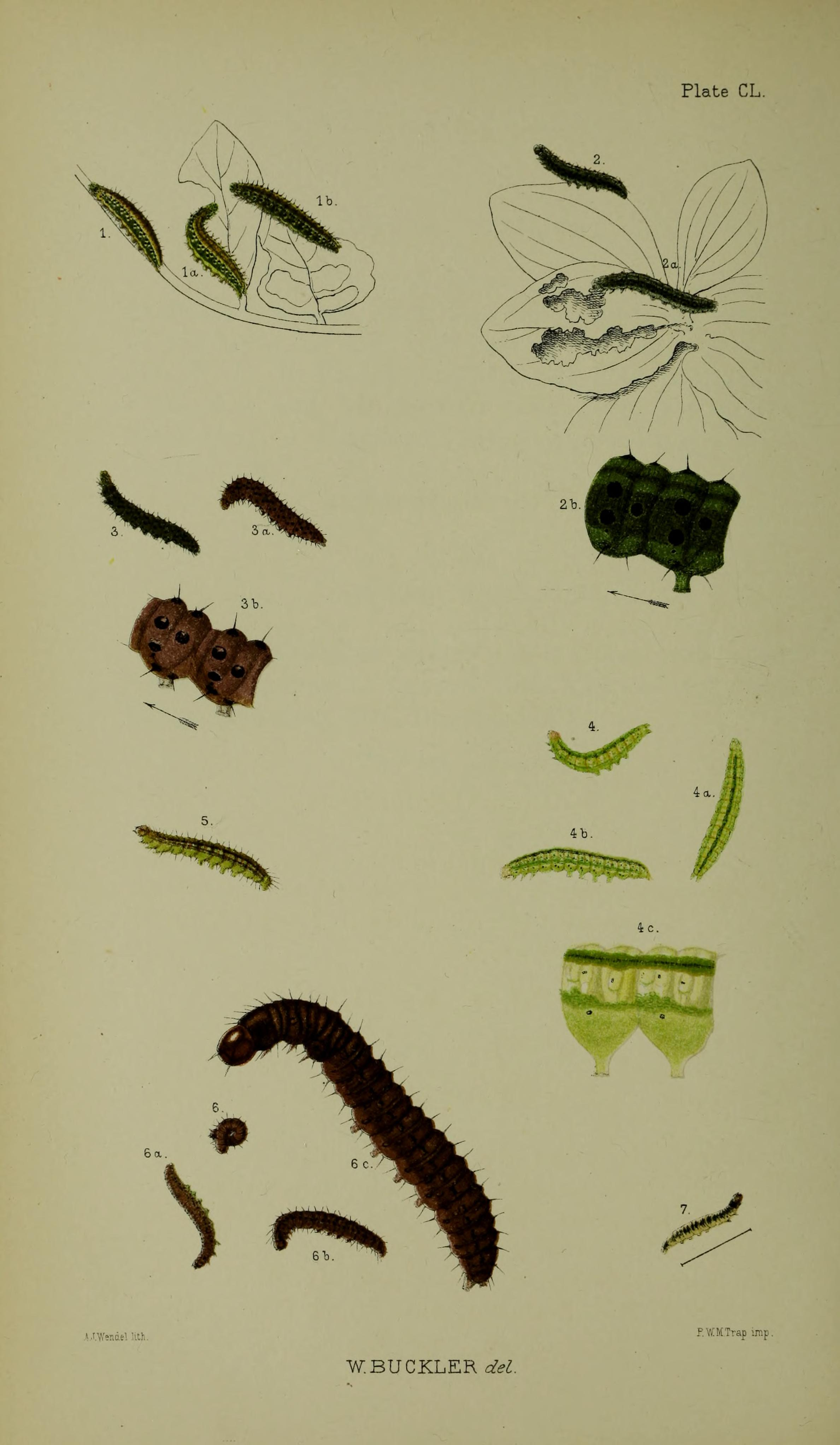
Fig 5 larvae after final moult on hornbeam

== Biology ==
The moths fly from May to July depending on the location. They are active at dusk. The larvae feed on leaves of Carpinus betulus, but are also spotted on hazel, birch and chestnut.

The young larvae usually live on the underside of leaves. Then they spins two leaves together. They overwinter in a cocoon, where pupation takes place.

== Gallery ==
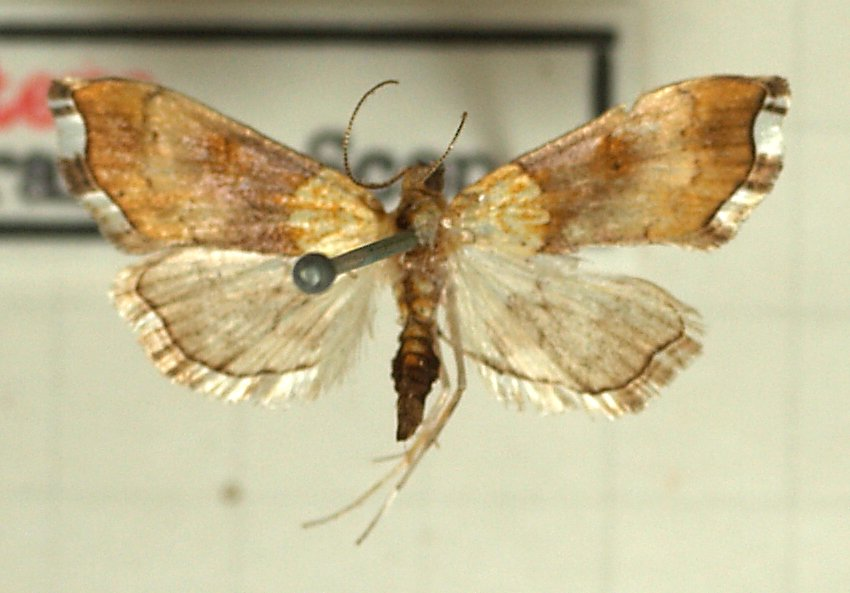
Mounted specimen

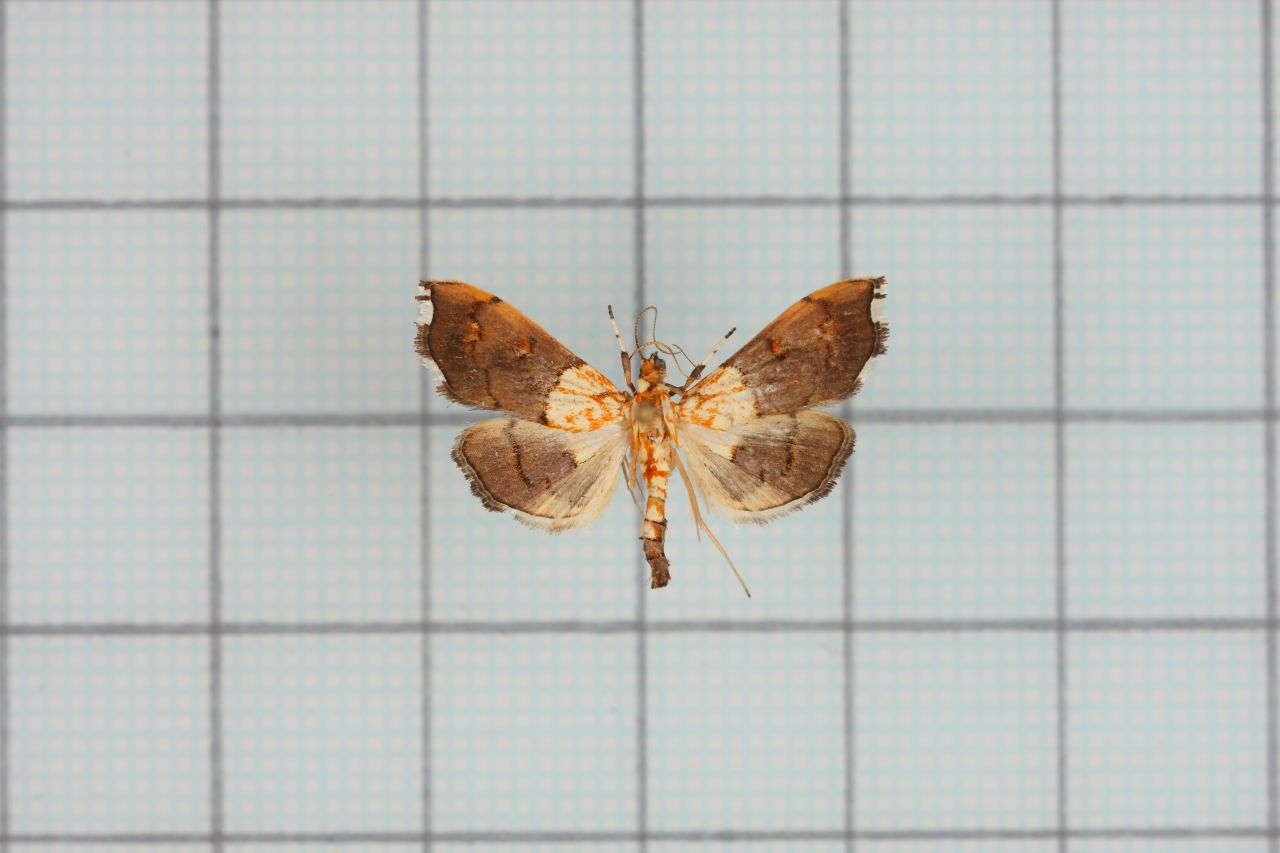
Mounted specimen
