= Agrotera fumosa =

Scientific classification
- Kingdom: Animalia
- Phylum: Arthropoda
- Clade: Pancrustacea
- Class: Insecta
- Order: Lepidoptera
- Family: Crambidae
- Genus: Agrotera
- Species: A. fumosa

Binomial name
- Agrotera fumosa Hampson, 1899

Species of moth

Agrotera fumosa is a moth in the family Crambidae. It was described by George Hampson in 1899. It is found in the Democratic Republic of the Congo (Equateur, Katanga, East Kasai), Ghana and Ivory Coast.
