= Agrotera albalis =

Scientific classification
- Kingdom: Animalia
- Phylum: Arthropoda
- Clade: Pancrustacea
- Class: Insecta
- Order: Lepidoptera
- Family: Crambidae
- Genus: Agrotera
- Species: A. albalis

Binomial name
- Agrotera albalis Maes, 2003

Species of moth

Agrotera albalis is a moth in the family Crambidae. It was first found on the island of Príncipe, between 450 and 600 m elevation, by Thomas Alexander Barns in 1926, and first described by Koen V. N. Maes in 2003.
