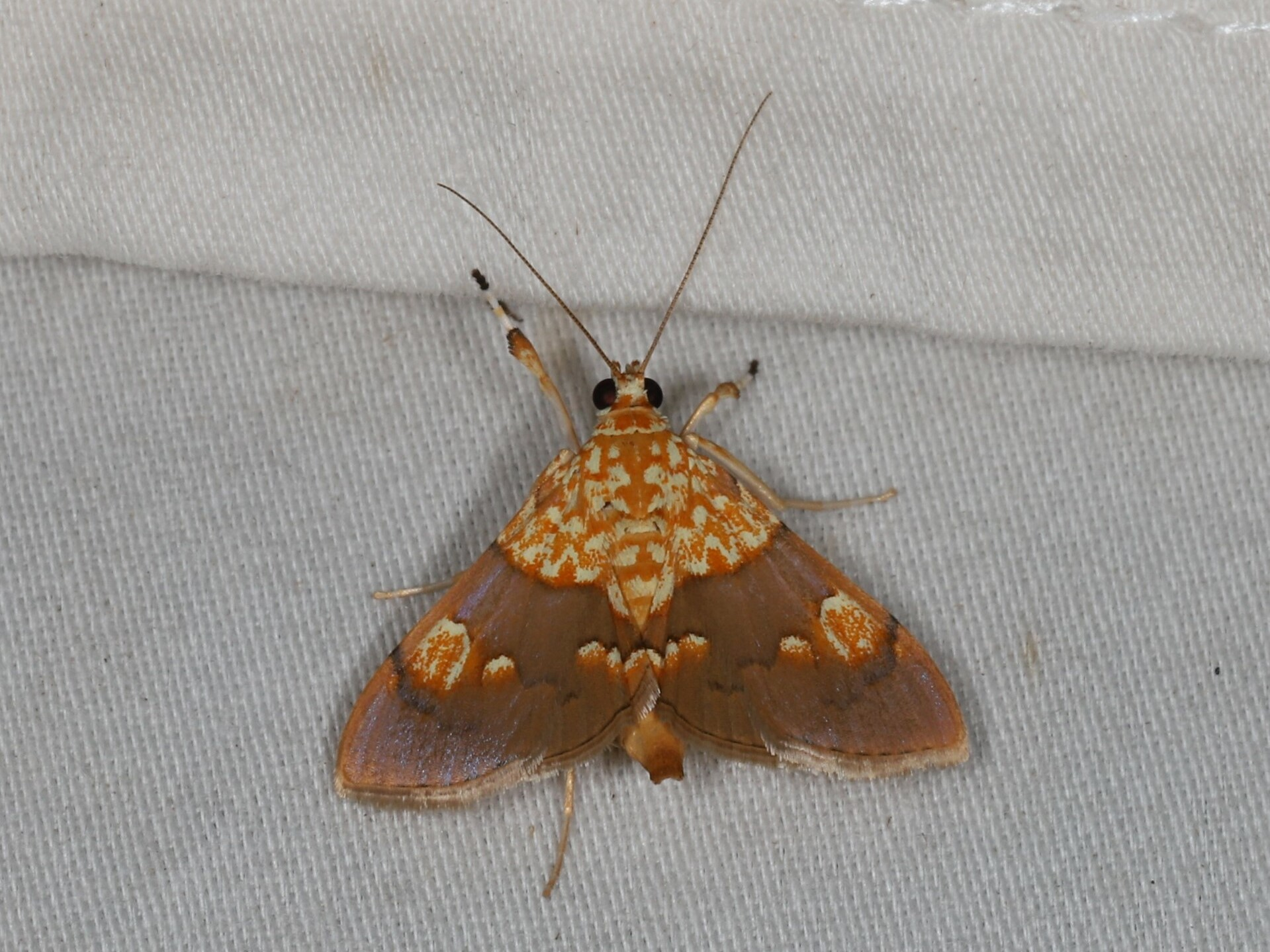

Scientific classification
- Kingdom: Animalia
- Phylum: Arthropoda
- Clade: Pancrustacea
- Class: Insecta
- Order: Lepidoptera
- Family: Crambidae
- Genus: Agrotera
- Species: A. glycyphanes

Binomial name
- Agrotera glycyphanes Turner, 1913

= Agrotera glycyphanes =

Species of moth

Agrotera glycyphanes is a species of moth in the family Crambidae. It was described by Alfred Jefferis Turner in 1913. It is found in Australia, where it has been recorded Queensland.

The wingspan is about 22 mm. The forewings are pale brown with a purple gloss. The basal third is pale yellow, reticulated with orange and bounded by an orange line. There is a large round pale yellow spot beneath the costa, edged and irrorated (sprinkled) with orange and a similar but smaller spot beneath this. There is also a pale-orange streak along the costa, as well as a fine fuscous line from the costa outwards, then bent to form a quadrangular projection, bent again to beneath a second spot.
