= Agrotera setipes =

Scientific classification
- Kingdom: Animalia
- Phylum: Arthropoda
- Clade: Pancrustacea
- Class: Insecta
- Order: Lepidoptera
- Family: Crambidae
- Genus: Agrotera
- Species: A. setipes

Binomial name
- Agrotera setipes Hampson, 1898

Species of moth

Agrotera setipes is a moth in the family Crambidae. It was described by George Hampson in 1898. It is found in Indonesia, where it has been recorded from the Natuna Islands.

The wingspan is about 22 mm. The forewings are pale purplish fuscous, the base marked with yellow and red. There is a pale subbasal band, defined by black towards the costa and irrorated (sprinkled) with red. The hindwings have a yellow and red patch below the end of the cell. Both the forewings and hindwings have a fine black marginal line.
