= Agrotera flavobasalis =

Scientific classification
- Kingdom: Animalia
- Phylum: Arthropoda
- Clade: Pancrustacea
- Class: Insecta
- Order: Lepidoptera
- Family: Crambidae
- Genus: Agrotera
- Species: A. flavobasalis

Binomial name
- Agrotera flavobasalis Inoue, 1996

Species of moth

Agrotera flavobasalis is a moth in the family Crambidae. It was described by Inoue in 1996. It is found in Japan, where it has been recorded from the Ogasawara islands.
