= Agrotera ornata =

Scientific classification
- Kingdom: Animalia
- Phylum: Arthropoda
- Clade: Pancrustacea
- Class: Insecta
- Order: Lepidoptera
- Family: Crambidae
- Genus: Agrotera
- Species: A. ornata

Binomial name
- Agrotera ornata Wileman & South, 1917

Species of moth

Agrotera ornata is a moth in the family Crambidae. It was described by Wileman and South in 1917. It is found in Taiwan.
