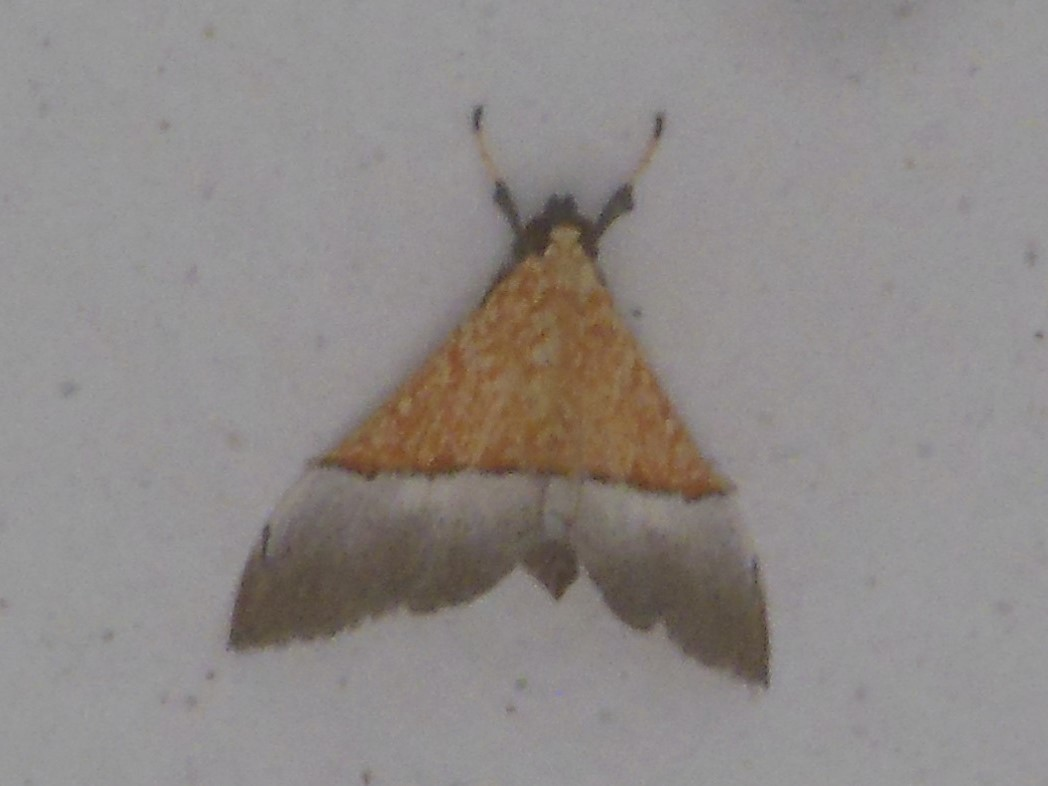

Scientific classification
- Kingdom: Animalia
- Phylum: Arthropoda
- Clade: Pancrustacea
- Class: Insecta
- Order: Lepidoptera
- Family: Crambidae
- Genus: Agrotera
- Species: A. scissalis

Binomial name
- Agrotera scissalis (Walker, 1866)

Synonyms
- Aediodes scissalis Walker, 1866

= Agrotera scissalis =

Species of moth

Agrotera scissalis is a species of moth in the family Crambidae. It was described by Francis Walker in 1866. It is found on Java.
