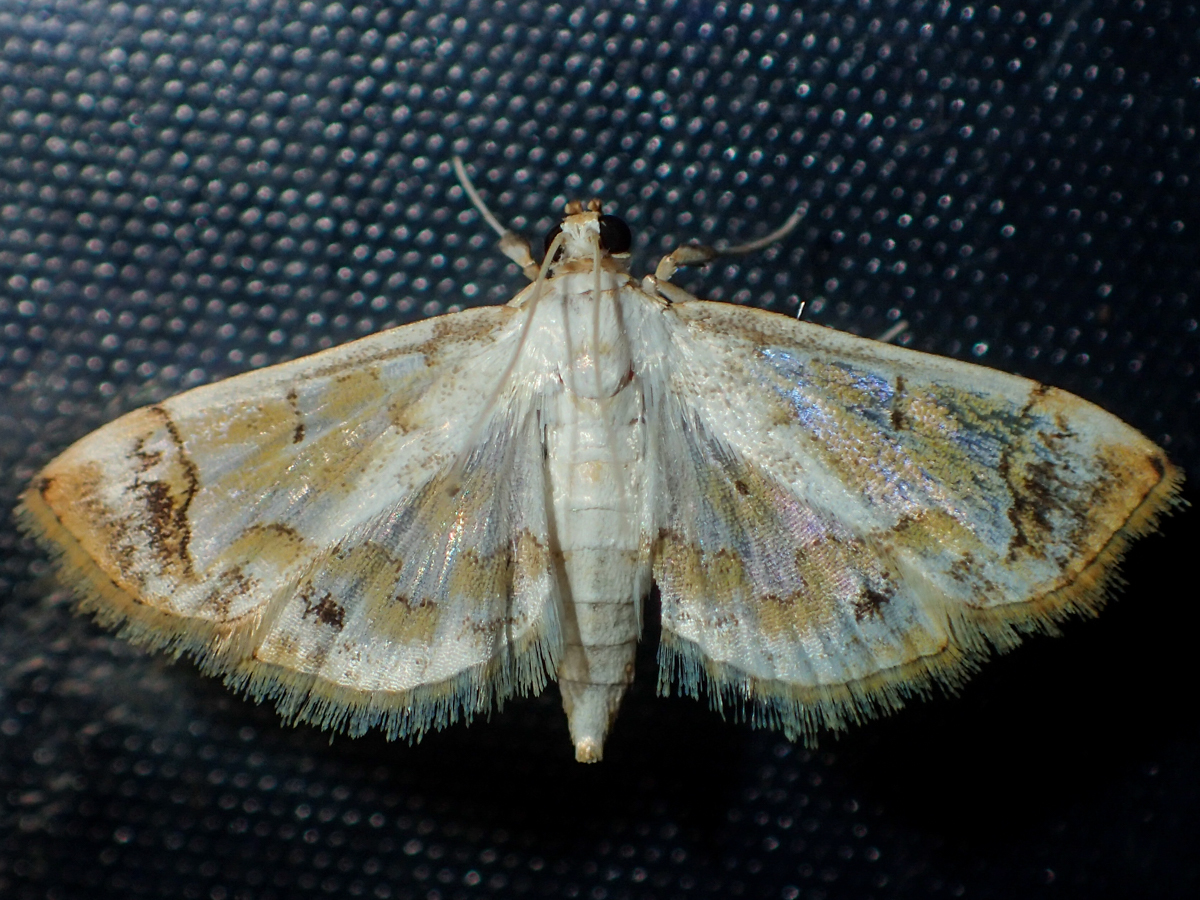

Scientific classification
- Kingdom: Animalia
- Phylum: Arthropoda
- Clade: Pancrustacea
- Class: Insecta
- Order: Lepidoptera
- Family: Crambidae
- Genus: Agrotera
- Species: A. barcealis

Binomial name
- Agrotera barcealis (Walker, 1859)

Synonyms
- List: Leucinodes barcealis Walker, 1859; Leucinodes opalina Moore, 1885; Zanclopteryx nitida Walker, 1866; Zebronia indecisalis Walker, 1866; Zebronia retractalis Walker, 1866

= Agrotera barcealis =

Species of moth

Agrotera barcealis is a species of moth in the family Crambidae. It was described by Francis Walker in 1859. It is found in Sri Lanka, Sumatra, Borneo and Mysol.

The forewings are opalescent white with ochreous-brown speckles at the base. Both wings have a slender ochreous-brown outer discal line, bordered with pale yellow externally. This is followed by a brown speckled submarginal band.
