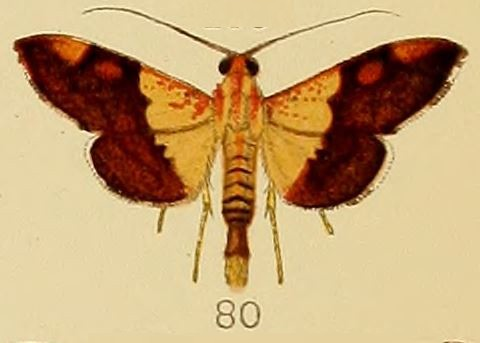

Scientific classification
- Kingdom: Animalia
- Phylum: Arthropoda
- Clade: Pancrustacea
- Class: Insecta
- Order: Lepidoptera
- Family: Crambidae
- Genus: Agrotera
- Species: A. semipictalis

Binomial name
- Agrotera semipictalis Kenrick, 1907

= Agrotera semipictalis =

Species of moth

Agrotera semipictalis is a moth in the family Crambidae. It was described by George Hamilton Kenrick in 1907. It is found on New Guinea.
