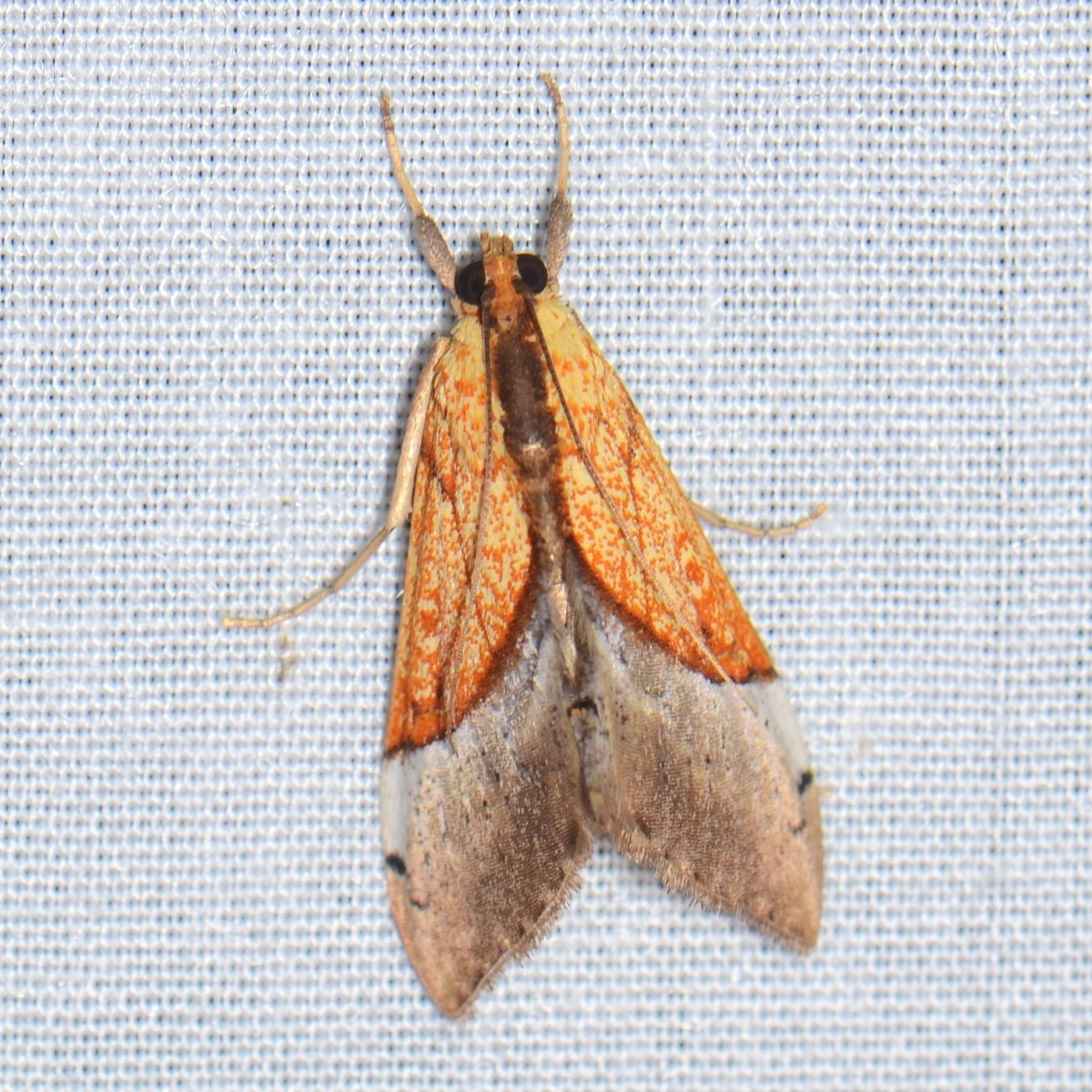

Scientific classification
- Kingdom: Animalia
- Phylum: Arthropoda
- Class: Insecta
- Order: Lepidoptera
- Family: Crambidae
- Genus: Sagariphora
- Species: S. magnificalis

Binomial name
- Sagariphora magnificalis (Hampson, 1893)

Synonyms
- Agrotera heliochlaena Meyrick, 1894; Agrotera magnificalis Hampson, 1893; Sagariphora heliochlaena (Meyrick, 1894)

= Sagariphora magnificalis =

Species of moth

Sagariphora magnificalis is a species of moth in the family Crambidae. It was described by George Hampson in 1893. It is found in Sri Lanka and on Sumbawa in Indonesia.
