= Pundaloya =

Coordinates: 7°01′N 80°40′E

- Town
- Interactive map of Pundaloya
- Country: Sri Lanka
- Province: Central Province
- Time zone: UTC+5:30 (Sri Lanka Standard Time)

Pundaloya is a small town located in Sri Lanka, between the Kothmale and Nuwara Eliya Districts within the country's Central Province. The town is located adjacent to the Pundaloya River and Highway B412.

== See also ==
- List of towns in Central Province, Sri Lanka
