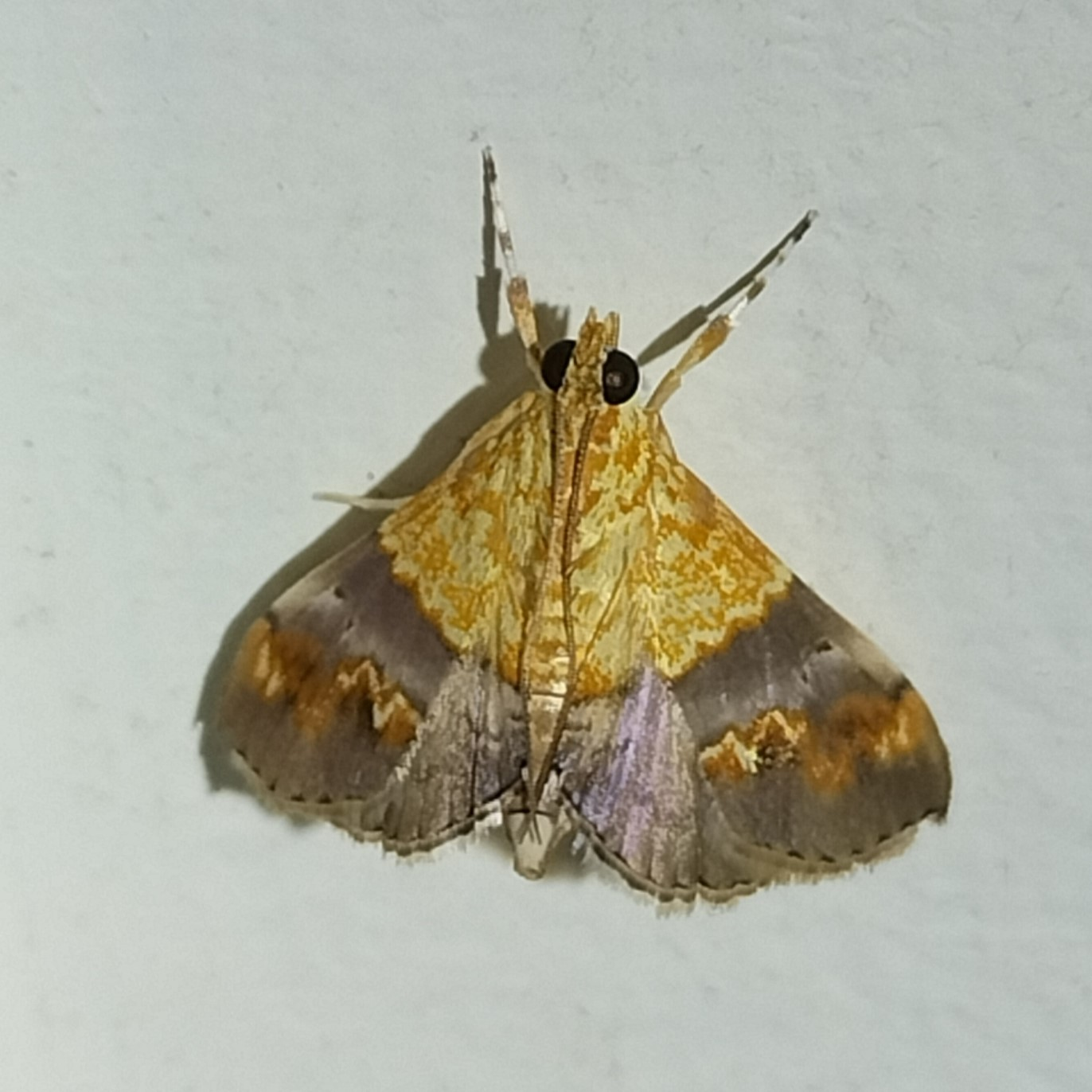

Scientific classification
- Kingdom: Animalia
- Phylum: Arthropoda
- Clade: Pancrustacea
- Class: Insecta
- Order: Lepidoptera
- Family: Crambidae
- Genus: Tetracona
- Species: T. amathealis

Binomial name
- Tetracona amathealis (Walker, 1859)

Synonyms
- Aediodes amathealis Walker, 1859; Agrotera amathealis (Walker, 1859); Pyralis ornatalis (Walker, 1866)

= Tetracona amathealis =

Species of moth

Tetracona amathealis is a species of snout moth in the subfamily Spilomelinae of the family Crambidae. It was described by Francis Walker in 1859 based on material collected at Moreton Bay in Queensland, Australia. It is found in New Guinea and Australia, where it has been recorded in Queensland, northern New South Wales and Western Australia. The species was formerly placed in the genus Agrotera, but in a recent taxonomic revision it was transferred back to the re-instated genus Tetracona, of which it is the type species.

The wingspan is about 20 mm.

The caterpillars feed on Eucalyptus tereticornis, a plant of economic interest, which is why T. amathealis is sometimes considered a pest species.
