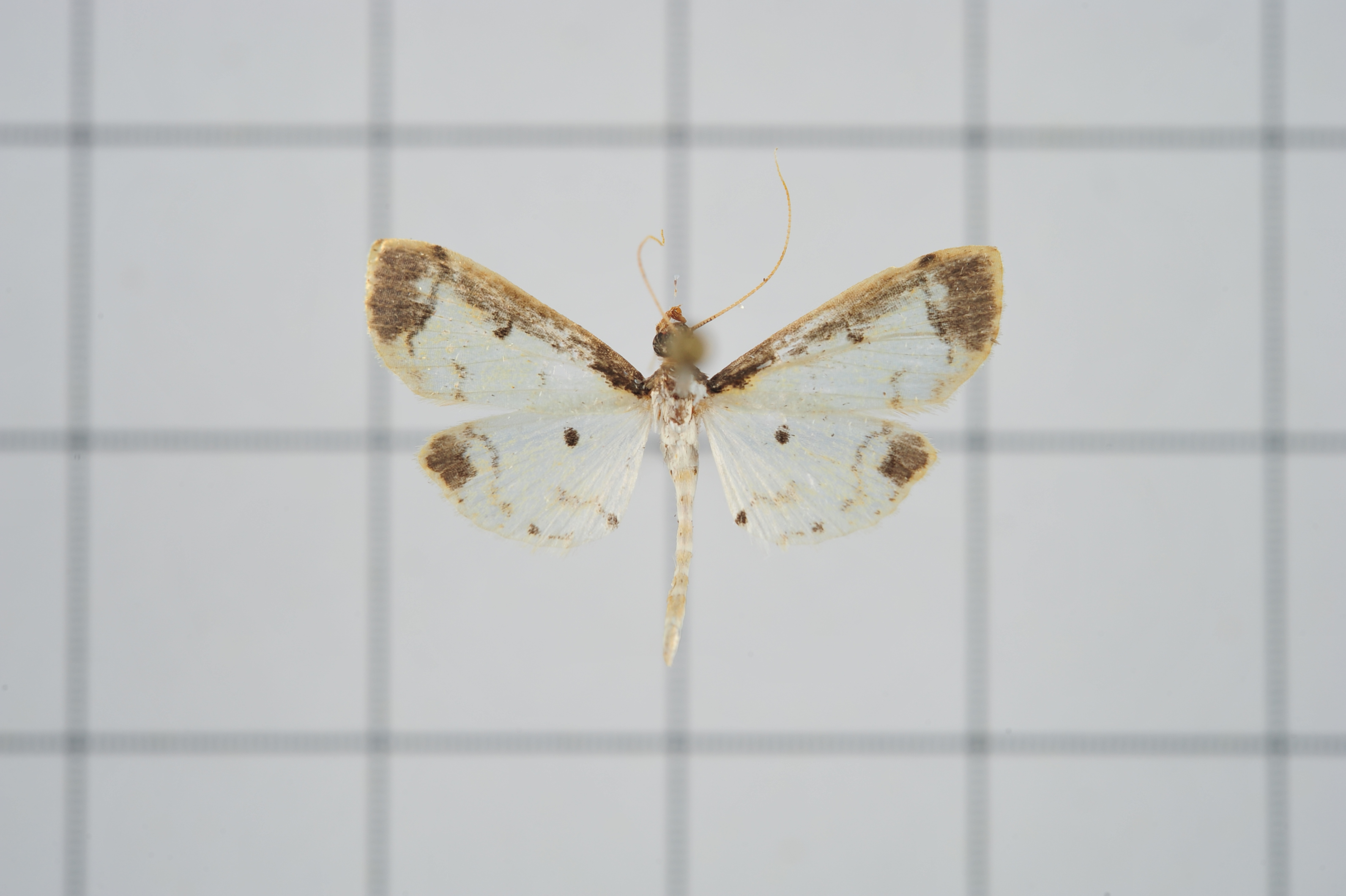

Scientific classification
- Kingdom: Animalia
- Phylum: Arthropoda
- Class: Insecta
- Order: Lepidoptera
- Family: Crambidae
- Genus: Leucinodella
- Species: L. leucostola

Binomial name
- Leucinodella leucostola (Hampson, 1896)

Synonyms
- Agrotera leucostola Hampson, 1896; Leucinodella agroterodes Strand, 1918

= Leucinodella leucostola =

Species of moth

Leucinodella leucostola is a species of moth in the family Crambidae. It was described by George Hampson in 1896. It is found in Taiwan and in the Indian states of Sikkim and Assam.

The wingspan is about 20 mm. The basal inner area of the forewings is white. There are two black spots in the cell. Both the forewings and hindwings have leaden-suffused patches on the apical area.
