= Tetracona =

- Tetracona multispina

Scientific classification
- Kingdom: Animalia
- Phylum: Arthropoda
- Clade: Pancrustacea
- Class: Insecta
- Order: Lepidoptera
- Family: Crambidae
- Tribe: Agroterini
- Genus: Tetracona; Meyrick, 1884

Genus of moths

Tetracona is a genus of snout moths in the subfamily Spilomelinae of the family Crambidae. The genus was described by Edward Meyrick in 1884 with Aediodes amathealis Walker, 1859 as type species.

The genus was long treated as a synonym of Agrotera, but a recent taxonomic revision of Agrotera resulted in the re-instatement of Tetracona.

The genus is placed in the tribe Agroterini based on the structure of the uncus, featuring a broad base and simple chaetae on the uncus head, a well-developed medial process of the gnathos, the rectangular, elongate valvae with parallel costal and ventral margins, and the notably elongate saccus (at least in T. amathealis).

The genus with its three species is known from Australia, New Guinea and China.

The caterpillars of Tetracona amathealis are recorded from Eucalyptus tereticornis in the Myrtaceae.

== Species ==
- Tetracona amathealis (Walker, 1859)
- Tetracona multispina Jie & Li in Jie et al. 2020
- Tetracona pictalis Warren, 1896
