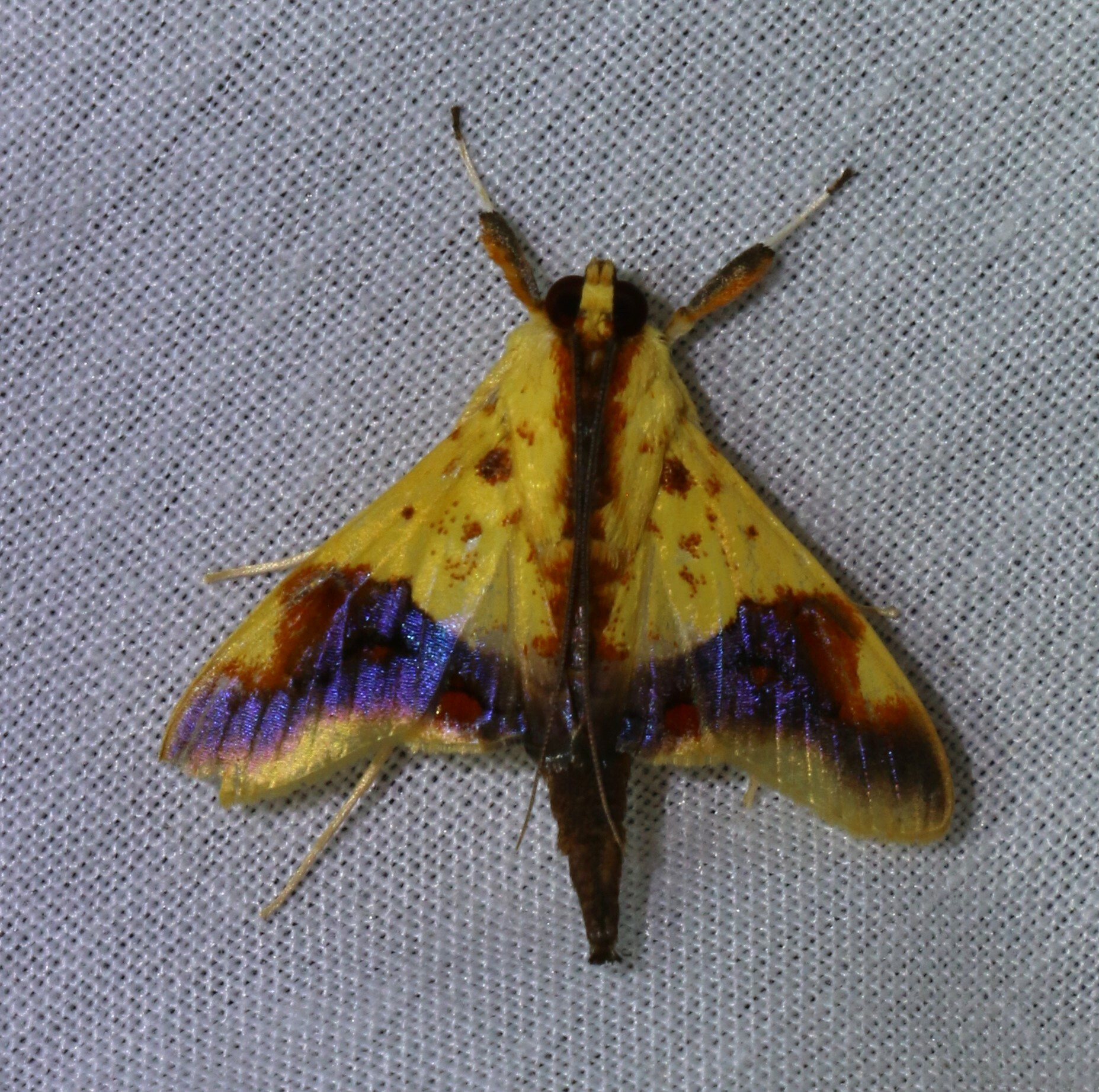

Scientific classification
- Kingdom: Animalia
- Phylum: Arthropoda
- Clade: Pancrustacea
- Class: Insecta
- Order: Lepidoptera
- Family: Crambidae
- Genus: Tetracona
- Species: T. pictalis

Binomial name
- Tetracona pictalis Warren, 1896

Synonyms
- Agrotera pictalis (Warren, 1896)

= Tetracona pictalis =

Species of moth

Tetracona pictalis is a species of snout moth in the family Crambidae. It was described by William Warren in 1896. It is found in Australia, where it has been recorded in Queensland. The habitat consists of rainforests.

The wingspan is about 30 mm. Adults are pale yellow with brilliant red and blue patches on the wing margins.
