= Staffordshire Yeomanry, Royal Armoured Corps =

Staffordshire Yeomanry, RAC
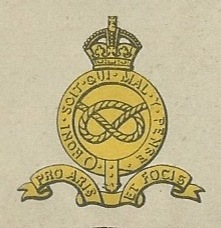
- Staffordshire Yeomanry badge, 1940s
- Active: 12 April 1941–1 April 1971
- Country: United Kingdom
- Branch: Territorial Army
- Type: Yeomanry
- Role: Cavalry/Armour
- Part of: Royal Armoured Corps
- Garrison/HQ: Wolverhampton/Stafford
- Engagements: Second World War Syria 1941 Battle of Alam el Halfa Second Battle of El Alamein Battle of El Agheila Battle of the Mareth Line Battle of Wadi Akarit D-Day Battle for Caen Operation Goodwood Battle of the Scheldt Operation Plunder Operation Enterprise

The Staffordshire Yeomanry, Royal Armoured Corps, was a tank regiment of Britain's Territorial Army converted from Yeomanry Cavalry serving in the Middle East during the Second World War. It fought at the Battles of Alam el Halfa and El Alamein in the Western Desert and the subsequent Tunisian campaign, distinguishing itself at the Battle of Tebaga Gap. It was then withdrawn to the UK to prepare for Operation Overlord, and landed on Sword Beach on D-Day. Subsequently, it was converted to operate amphibious tanks, and served in this role in the Battle of the Scheldt and the crossings of the Rhine (Operation Plunder) and Elbe (Operation Enterprise). Postwar, the Staffordshire Yeomanry remained part of the Royal Armoured Corps through various amalgamations.

== Background ==
The Staffordshire Yeomanry (Queen's Own Royal Regiment) was a mounted auxiliary unit of the British Army raised in 1794 to defend Great Britain from foreign invasion. Its part-time soldiers from Staffordshire in the English Midlands acted in support of the civil powers during the 19th Century and supplied active service companies to the Imperial Yeomanry during the Second Boer War. In 1908 the Yeomanry became part of the Territorial Force, and volunteered for overseas service during the First World War when the active service regiment of the Staffs Yeomanry saw action in the Sinai and Palestine campaign, culminating in the Capture of Damascus.

The Staffordshire Yeomanry was reformed in the Territorial Force (later Territorial Army (TA)) on 7 February 1920. The experience of the First World War had shown that the British Army (Regular and Territorial) had a surplus of cavalry. The War Office decided that only the 14 most senior Yeomanry regiments were to be retained as cavalry, the remainder being converted to other roles such as armoured cars or artillery. As the 5th most senior regiment in the Yeomanry order of precedence, the Staffordshire Yeomanry was retained as horsed cavalry. By the later 1930s the policy was to mechanise all remaining cavalry units, but the TA was at the bottom of the priority list for modern equipment, and this had still not been done for the Yeomanry when the Second World War broke out.

Prior to the Second World War, the Staffs Yeomanry formed part of 6th Cavalry Brigade, a TA formation in Western Command, together with the Warwickshire Yeomanry and the Cheshire Yeomanry.

== Second World War ==
=== Mobilisation ===
The TA was called out just before war was declared and the Staffordshire Yeomanry mobilised at its headquarters at Wolverhampton on 1 September 1939. On 31 October, 6th Cavalry Bde became part of a reformed 1st Cavalry Division. There was clearly no role for cavalry in the mechanised warfare anticipated in Europe, so instead 1st Cavalry Division was sent to perform security duties in Mandatory Palestine, where they could still be effective, and would release other troops for the main fighting fronts. 6th Cavalry Bde crossed the English Channel on 18 December, and after transiting France embarked at Marseille on 31 December.

=== Palestine ===
6th Cavalry Bde arrived in Palestine on 9 January 1940, followed by the rest of the division, which was assembled by 20 February. However, most of is ancillary units and motor transport were taken from it, leaving only the three horsed brigades and some artillery.

Over the next year, the division carried out internal security, quelling disturbances between Palestinians and Jewish settlers, and planned for mechanisation. Initially this was as motorised infantry mounted in 15-hundredweight trucks, though the five senior yeomanry regiments in the division (the Staffordshire being 5th) had been selected to be converted to armour when tanks became available. The Staffordshire Yeomanry officially became part of the Royal Armoured Corps (RAC) from 12 April 1941.

In April 1941, as British Middle East Forces were dealing with the German invasion of Greece and Rommel's advance in Cyrenaica, there was a coup d'état in Iraq that threatened to allow Axis forces into the vital oilfields. British HQ in Palestine and Transjordan (P&TJ) hastily sent what troops it could gather, including 4th Cavalry Bde (the only part of 1st Cavalry Division that had received all its lorries), to fight the short Anglo-Iraqi War. Vichy French forces in Syria allowed Axis aircraft to refuel on their way to Iraq and there were fears that Syria would become an Axis base, so HQ P&TJ pre-emptively invaded Syria in early June in Operation Exporter. The force included Free French, Australian and Indian troops, together with the remainder of 1st Cavalry Division (still mainly horsed). The Staffs Yeomanry served with 5th Cavalry Bde from 30 April to 4 June, returning to 6th Cavalry Bde just before the move into Southern Syria. Elements of 6th Cavalry Bde with its 15-cwt trucks and a few armoured cars took part in the Syria–Lebanon campaign, which ended after the fall of Palmyra and Damascus with the Armistice of Saint Jean d'Acre on 14 July. The 6th Cavalry Bde detachment then continued to Teheran as part of the pre-emptive Anglo-Soviet invasion of Iran: here they were the first troops to make contact with the advancing Soviet force.

On return to Palestine, 6th Cavalry Bde found that the 1st Cavalry Division had finally given up its last horses. 1st Cavalry Division and 6th Cavalry Bde were redesignated 10th Armoured Division and 8th Armoured Bde respectively on 1 August 1941. A few US-built Stuart tanks began to arrive that month, and by October each regiment had three for training. In addition to the Staffs Yeomanry stationed at Karkur Sea Camp, 8th Armoured Bde now comprised the Royal Scots Greys and Sherwood Rangers Yeomanry.

=== Western Desert ===
8th Armoured Brigade's formation sign, giving rise to its 'Fox' nickname.

In February 1942, the brigade moved to Khataba, 30 miles north-west of Cairo on the edge of the Western Desert, where desert training was carried out and the regiments were slowly brought up to their full strength of Stuart and Grant tanks. The organisation of 10th Armoured Division was still not complete, but during the crisis of the Battle of Gazala the 8th Armoured Bde was ordered up to join Eighth Army. However, when the brigade reached the Mersa Matruh area at the end of June it was ordered to hand its tanks over to re-equip the experienced 1st Armoured Division. The two yeomanry regiments (together with 3rd Royal Tank Regiment (3rd RTR))were sent back to Tahag Camp near Ismailia to await the arrival of fresh tanks.

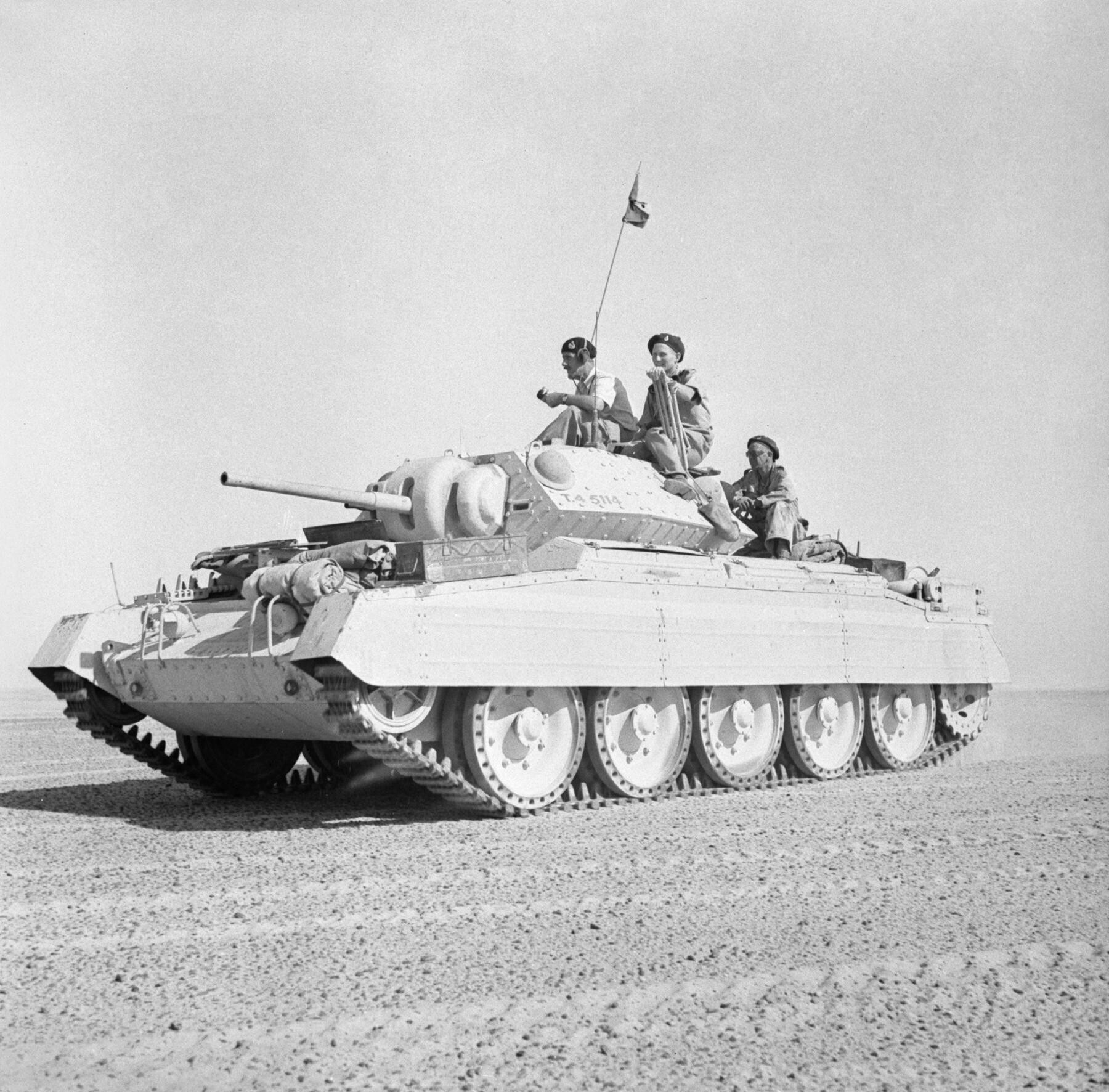
Crusader Mk II in the Western Desert, October 1942.

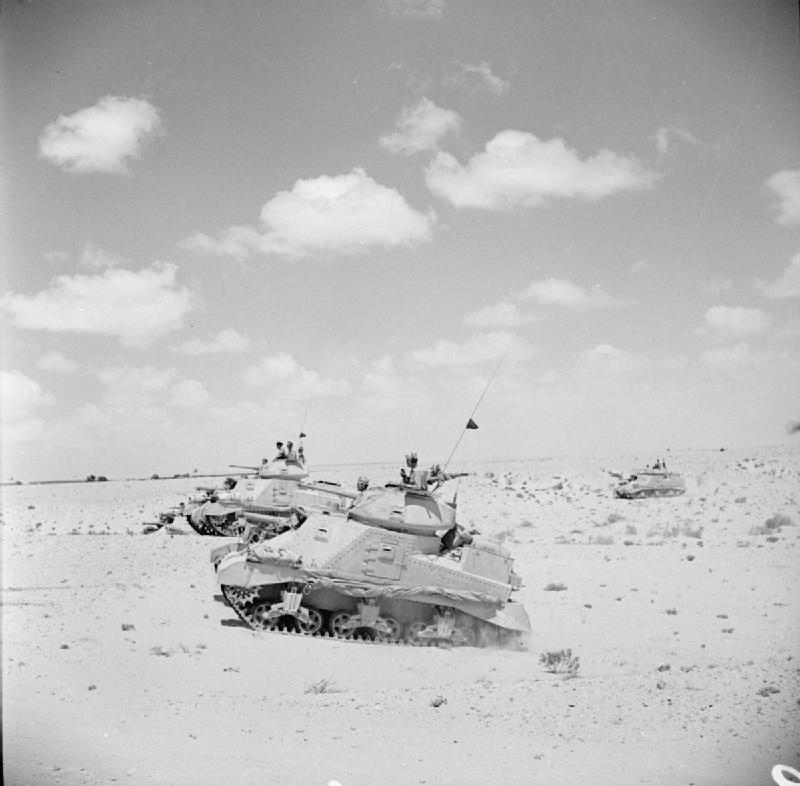
Grant tanks training in the Western Desert August 1942.

The Axis advance was halted at the First Battle of El Alamein in July 1942. By the time Field Marshal Erwin Rommel was ready to attack again, at the Battle of Alam el Halfa on 30 August, the British Eighth Amy had been reinforced and largely re-equipped under Gen Bernard Montgomery. 10th Armoured Division was now in the line, and 8th Armoured Bde was equipped with 12 Crusader and 72 Grant tanks. It was positioned at Berg al-Arab on the right flank of Rommel's anticipated line of advance. When Rommel's Afrika Korps attacked on 31 August their tanks were caught in minefields and mauled by 22nd Armoured Bde of 10th Armoured Division. Next day, 8th Armoured Bde was ordered out to make contact with 22nd Armoured Bde, but ran onto a German anti-tank (A/T) screen and lost 13 Grants. By 2 September, the Germans were withdrawing; however the commander of XIII Corps, Lt-Gen Brian Horrocks, was under orders not to risk his tanks and did not follow up. However, 8th Armoured Bde formed a composite regiment from the light squadron of each regiment, and this remained in action around Himeimat for another week.

=== Alamein to Tripoli ===
Montgomery continued preparations for his own offensive, the Second Battle of El Alamein, and 8th Armoured Bde underwent intensive training at Wadi Natrun. Lieutenant-Col Jim Eadie took over command of the Staffs Yeomanry from Lt-Col Gordon Cox-Cox. On the eve of the battle, the brigade was equipped with 31 of the new Sherman tanks, 57 Grants, 33 older Crusaders and 12 new Crusader Mk IIIs. The attack (Operation Lightfoot) was launched on the night of 23/24 October following a massive artillery barrage. At first, the tanks had to pick their way in the dark through the British minefield: 8th Armoured Bde advanced though the New Zealand Division's sector with all three regiments abreast, each following a narrow corridor. It then crossed the enemy minefields through lanes cleared by special minefield task forces, and reached the Miteirya Ridge. However, trying to cross the ridge at first light, it was held up by mines and A/T fire: the Staffs Yeomanry only lost two tanks, but the whole brigade went into Hull down positions behind the ridge. It intended to resume the advance the following night, but there were far more mines behind the ridge than expected and clearance was slow. At zero hour (22.00) the brigade was formed up to pass through the gap when it was caught by an enemy air attack: vehicles were set on fire, and the blaze attracted other bombers. The tanks were forced to disperse as best they could. Despite the disorganisation, Montgomery ordered 10th Armoured Division to do its utmost to break our that night. By dawn, all three regiments of 8th Armoured Bde had emerged from a single gap, but came under increasingly heavy fire, with no hull-down positions available, and withdrew behind the ridge once more.

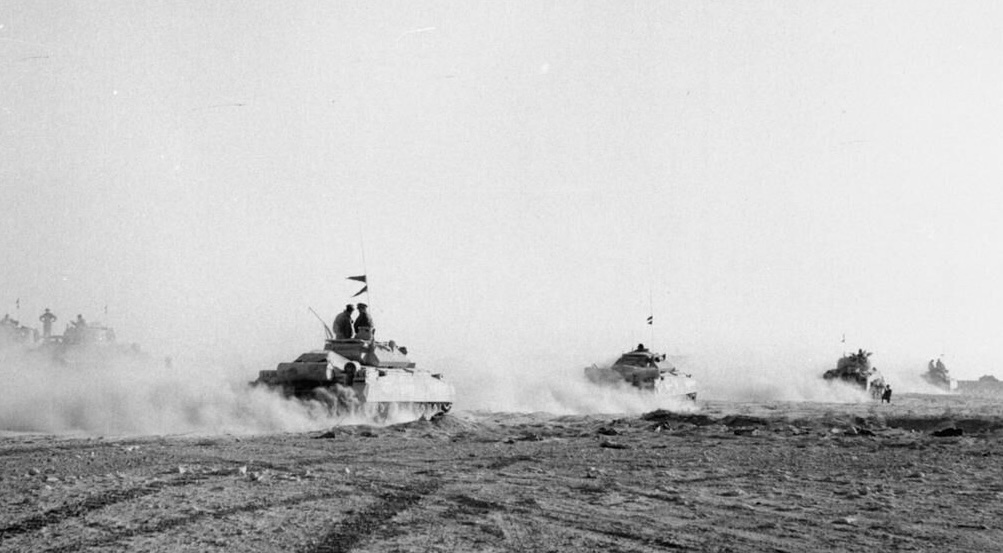
British tanks move up at Alamein on 24 October.

Montgomery relaunched the offensive with Operation Supercharge on the night of 1/2 November. 8th Armoured Bde still had 23 Shermans, 39 Grants, 27 Crusader Mk IIs and 20 Crusader Mk IIIs. As part of the follow-up force, it deployed behind 9th Armoured Bde at Tell el Aqqaqir, then came up on the flank of 2nd Armoured Bde the following morning, ordered to make ground to the south west. Again, it was halted by heavy fire and lost a number of tanks destroyed and damaged, but the Afrika Korps had also lost heavily. The brigade continued trying to push south west on 3 November. The situation was very muddled, but by now the Axis forces were beginning to withdraw: next day they were in full retreat. 8th Armoured Bde cut through to the coast road, mopping up enemy tanks and vehicles, and captured 1000 prisoners. On 5 November, they covered 30 miles (48 km) to its objective of Galal in just over 4 hours, destroying columns of Italian tanks and vehicles on the way, taking another 700 prisoners. It then advanced another 9 miles (14 km) to capture the high ground west of Fuka. That night there was torrential rain, which made the country impassable, but 8th Armoured Bde drove up the coast road to Mersa Matruh. Here it was held up by A/T guns, but its infantry (1st Battalion, Buffs) forced a way through the minefield after dark, and at daylight the Staffordshire Yeomanry advanced up the coast, meeting the Sherwood Rangers who had driven through the town, finding it abandoned. The brigade formed up with enough petrol to reach the Cyrenaica frontier, but it was halted at Mersa while other formations took up the pursuit.

8th Armoured Bde was static for two weeks, during which 10th Armoured Division HQ was ordered back to Egypt, the brigade becoming an independent formation on 21 November 1942. At first, it was attached to X Corps, then XXX Corps from 26 November, when it was ordered up on tank transporters to join the 7th Armoured Division at Jedabiya. It then moved by bounds across Cyrenaica, relieving 22nd Armoured Bde just south of Mersa Brega. On 14 December, the brigade fought a sharp action south of El Agheila against the Italian Ariete Armoured Division acting as the Axis rearguard. Lieutenant-Col Eadie led the Staffs Yeomanry in a flank attack that accounted for a number of enemy tanks. Next day, he led it through marshy country on another outflanking move and the regiment was continuously in action from 11.00 to nightfall, under heavy artillery and A/T fire for most of the day. (Note: Lieutenant-Col Eadie was awarded an 'Immediate' Distinguished Service Order (DSO) for his leadership at El Agheila on 14–15 December 1942.) On 17 December, a squadron of the Staffs Yeomanry helped the 2nd New Zealand Division in an enveloping operation against Nofilia, but the enemy columns driving across the desert escaped the trap. Eighth Army continued to push westwards with XXX Corps in the lead. After resting and refitting, 8th Armoured Bde crossed the Wadi Um er Raml with air support on 15 January 1943, the Staffs Yeomanry then leading the pursuit. A rearguard position at Wadi Zem Zem was forced, despite A/T guns and tanks dug in on the reverse slope. After two more stiff actions among the hills at Sedada and Tarhuna, the Staffs Yeomanry accepted the surrender of the latter town on 20 January. By 23 January 1943, Eighth Army had entered Tripoli.

=== Tunisia ===
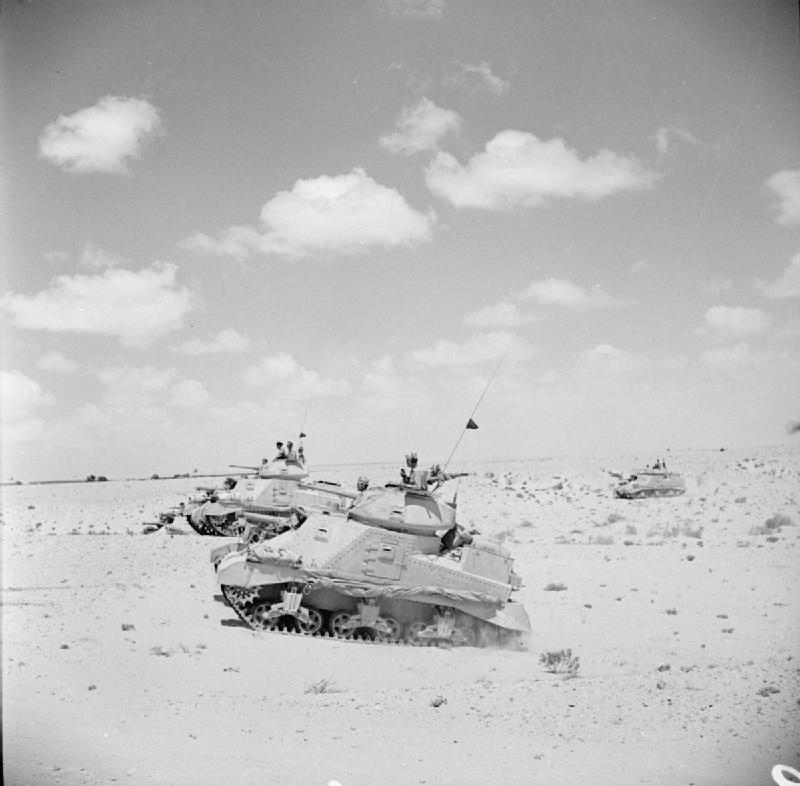
M3 Grant tanks advancing in Tunisia, April 1943.

While the rest of the brigade rested and refitted in Tripoli, the Composite Regiment under the command of Lt-Col Eadie of the Staffs Yeomanry continued with operations in the El Assa area to the west. During February the brigade moved out through El Uotia and Ben Gardane to Medenine. On 6 March, the Germans delivered a counter-attack at Medenine (Operation Capri), and the tanks of 8th Armoured Bde moved out to take up battle positions. However, the attack was largely driven off by British artillery. The German forces then withdrew behind the Mareth Line. Eighth Army's operation against the Mareth Line beginning on the night of 20/21 March included a wide 'left hook' to penetrate the Tebaga Gap and outflank the defences, in which 8th Armoured Bde accompanied the New Zealand Corps under Lt-Gen Bernard Freyberg. When the attempt to force the line frontally failed, the left hook became the principal attack, and was strongly reinforced. 8th Armoured Bde moved off on tank transporters on 14 March and reached their assembly area on the night of 17/18 March. The New Zealanders began their approach march two nights later, 8th Armoured Bde advancing in nine parallel columns across rough ground to engage the enemy at 'Roman Wall'. On 21/22 March, New Zealand infantry seized Point 201 to allow 8th Armoured Bde through the gap, but the armour was not ordered to attempt it until after first light, by which time the Germans had brought up A/T and field guns. By 25 March, Horrocks and X Corps had arrived to reinforce the New Zealanders' attack on the gap (Operation Supercharge II). The artillery programme began at 16.00 on 26 March and the tanks emerged from cover near the Roman Wall, the heavier Grants and Shermans leading followed by the lighter Crusaders, some of the New Zealand infantry riding on the tanks. The tanks advanced rapidly with the sun behind them, the Staffs Yeomanry in the centre followed by 23rd New Zealand Battalion. There was no pause on the high ground that formed the first objective, and although opposition stiffened at the wadi that constituted the second objective the Yeomanry went straight through it and on to Wadi Aisoub at a cost of six tanks, while 23rd NZ Bn knocked out one enemy post after another. Soon after 18.00, the leading brigade of 1st Armoured Division passed through 8th Armoured Bde and continued the headlong rush through the night. The following morning a German force attempted to attack the rear of 1st Armoured Division's column, but was driven off by the A/T guns and 8th Armoured Bde's tanks. Although the advance was slowed by rearguards on 28 March, and failed to reach El Hamma in time to cut off the enemy, the Battle of Tebaga Gap had forced the Axis out of the formidable Mareth Line. (Note: The Staffordshire Yeomanry was awarded the battle honours Sebkret en Noual and Djebel el Telil for actions during the Battle of the Mareth Line.)

The tired 8th Armoured Bde went back into action on 6 April at the Battle of Wadi Akarit. The infantry attack on the hills was successful but the Staffs Yeomanry were held up by A/T fire at the exit from the pass. The Germans evacuated the position that night, and the regiment was able to advance rapidly next day until they contacted Germans tanks in the evening; the Staffs Yeomanry and Sherwood Rangers holding higher ground, the Germans did not attack, but exchanged fire. The brigade advanced again after dark. The advance continued in the direction of Sfax with actions against enemy transport and rearguards: on 9 April the Staffs Yeomanry knocked out four tanks without loss to themselves. The brigade advanced parallel to the coast, bypassing Sousse and heading towards Enfidaville, outside which it took up positions facing the German defences, with the Staffs Yeomanry on the main road. The attack on the Enfidaville Line began on the night of 19/20 April, with 8th Armoured Bde supporting the New Zealand Division in its attack on the hilltop village of Takrouna. The terrain was bad for tanks, but the position was cleared by the end of 21 April.

The country in front of Eighth Army was unsuitable for armour, so 8th Armoured Bde halted at Enfidaville to carry out maintenance. Tunis fell to First Army on 7 May and the Tunisian campaign ended on 13 May with the surrender of the Axis forces. The Italian commander, Marshal Giovanni Messe, insisted in surrendering to the Eighth Army, negotiations being carried out via the wireless on the Staffs Yeomanry's command tank. In the period from the Battle of Alamein to 26 April 1943 the regiment had lost 7 officers and 38 other ranks (ORs) killed, 38 officers and 120 ORs wounded, and 3 officers and 29 ORs missing.

=== Overlord training ===
27th Armoured Brigade's formation sign.

After the fall of Tunis, 8th Armoured Bde returned to Libya (15 June 1943) and was not employed in the invasions of Sicily or Italy. It left for the long journey back to Egypt on 16 September. It was then selected with other veteran formations to return to the UK to prepare for the planned Allied invasion of Normandy (Operation Overlord). Leaving their tanks, the men embarked on the transports Tegelberg and Nieuw Holland on 18 November 1943, landed in Scotland on 11 December and rejoined XXX Corps next day. Early in 1944, the brigade assembled at Chippenham Park in Cambridgeshire to begin training for Overlord. A policy decision having been made to even out experience among the various formations, the Staffs Yeomanry, still under Lt-Col Eadie, left 8th Armoured Bde on 13 February to join 27th Armoured Bde, which had not seen action since the Dunkirk evacuation.

27th Armoured Bde had been selected to land with amphibious DD tanks on Sword Beach in support of 3rd Division, and had been training in the Moray Firth. However, there was a shortage of DD Shermans, so the Staffs Yeomanry was equipped with conventional Shermans and 17-pounder armed Sherman Fireflies to be landed from Landing craft tank (LCTs) directly onto the beach.

=== D-Day ===
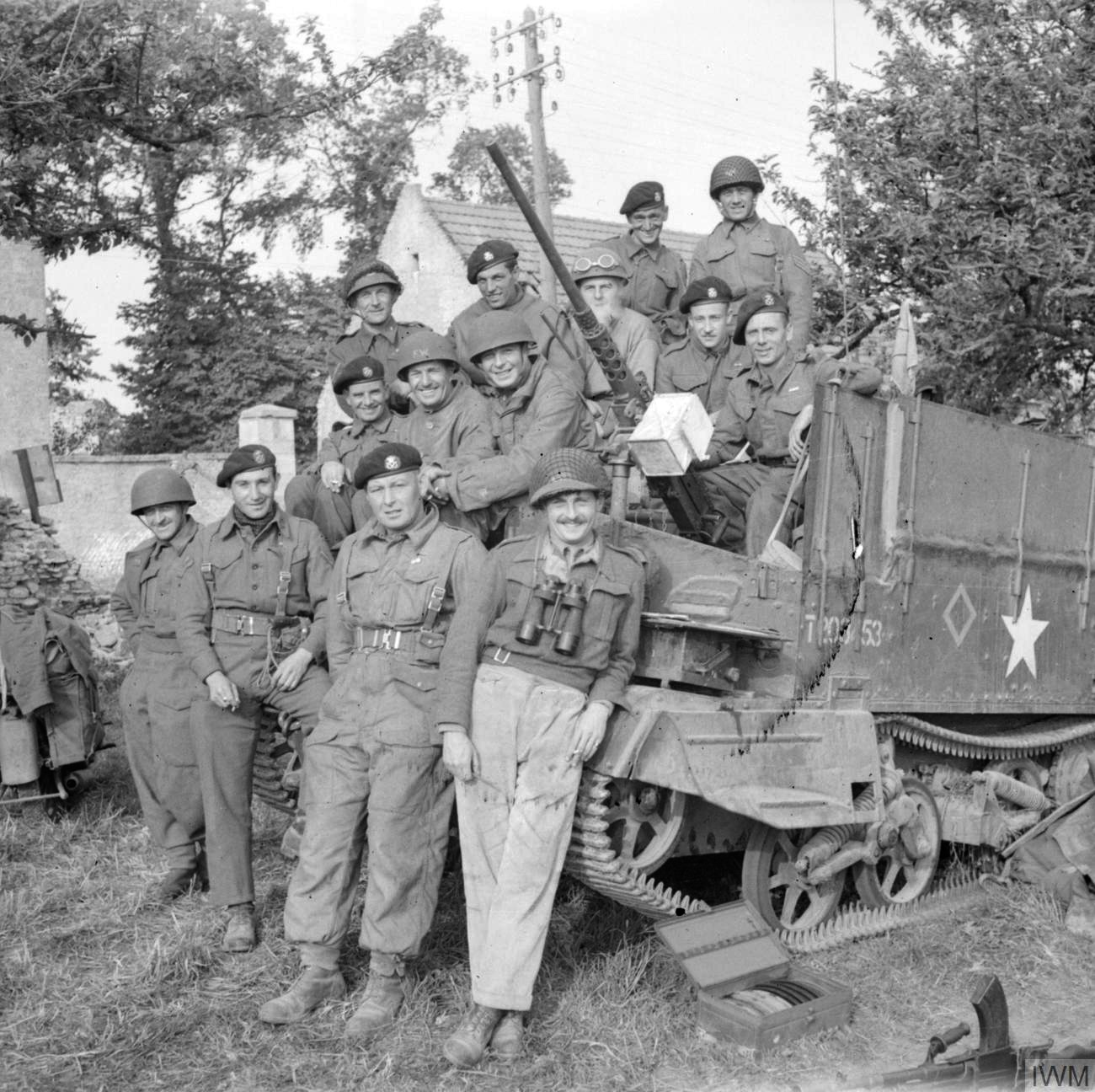
Men of the Staffordshire Yeomanry with a Universal Carrier, 7 June 1944.

8th Infantry Brigade, preceded by the DD tanks of 27th Armoured Bde, made 3rd Division's initial assault landing on 'Queen' Beach at H-Hour on 6 June (D-Day). The Shermans of the Staffordshire Yeomanry then began landing at H+90 minutes (08.55) to support 185th Brigade, the spearhead of 3rd Division's advance. It was one of the few conventional tank units actually to land on D-Day. 185th Brigade's ambitious objective for the day was to move rapidly inland and seize Caen, led by a mobile column consisting of the 2nd Battalion, King's Shropshire Light Infantry (KSLI), riding on the tanks of the Staffs Yeomanry. Unfortunately, the tidal conditions and the prolonged resistance of the beach defences and inland strongpoints slowed and dissipated 185th Bde's effort. With the Staffs Yeomanry's tanks still stuck on the beach, 2nd KSLI set off at 12.00 on foot, towards Beuville, Biéville and Lébisey on their way to Caen, leaving the tanks to catch up later. Their advance up Périers Ridge was dogged by small arms and mortar fire, and on reaching the crest the battalion was engaged by a German howitzer battery. When B Squadron of the Staffs Yeomanry caught up, an 88mm gun knocked out five tanks, including the artillery Observation Post (OP) tank. Leaving B Sqn and a company of 2nd KSLI to deal with the ridge, and detaching A Sqn to help the Suffolk Regiment deal with the 'Hillman' strongpoint, the remainder of the Staffs Yeomanry and 2nd KSLI continued the advance. By 16.20 Biéville was secure and the leading elements were approaching Lébisey, when the first German counter-attack came in. This was made by about 40 Panzer IV tanks of 21st Panzer Division, which had struggled through Caen that morning but were now approaching fast. They were seen by the Staffs Yeomanry's Reconnaissance Troop and the attack was ambushed by the Fireflies of the Staffs Yeomanry, the 6-pounder A/T guns of 2nd KSLI and the 17-pdrs of 20th Anti-Tank Regiment, Royal Artillery. The Germans lost 10 Panzer IVs. A second attack ran into the KSLI and B Sqn well-sited on Périers Ridge, and lost another six Panzer IVs. Although the German counter-attack had been defeated, the KSLI/Staffs group had not reached Caen by nightfall, when Eadie withdrew his tanks to leaguer at Biéville; later the leading infantry company was withdrawn from Lébisey. 3rd Division was about 3 miles (4.8 km) short of Caen and it would be another 33 days before the northern part of the city was in Allied hands. Meanwhile, 27th Armoured Bde was assigned to assist 6th Airborne Division in its bridgehead across the River Orne.

=== Caen ===
The Battle for Caen was a drawn-out affair but, after several attempts against its flanks, Montgomery committed to a direct assault on the city by I Corps on 8 July (Operation Charnwood). The corps assigned 27th Armoured Bde to support the attacking divisions, with the Staffs Yeomanry attached to 3rd Division once more. After a massive air and artillery bombardment, the divisions attacked at 04.20. The first phase advance was rapid, and 3rd Division had captured Lébisey within an hour. The second phase began at 07.30 but although 3rd Division made progress beyond Lébisey its neighbour was held up. I Corps ordered 3rd Division to push its armour (the Staffs Yeomanry) forward to the high ground north of Caen (Point 64), and later reinforced it with 33rd Armoured Bde. Point 64 was gained before nightfall, and next morning 3rd Division pushed tank patrols against the city centre where there was still resistance among the smashed buildings. By 18.00 on 9 July, I Corps held all of Caen north of the Orne.

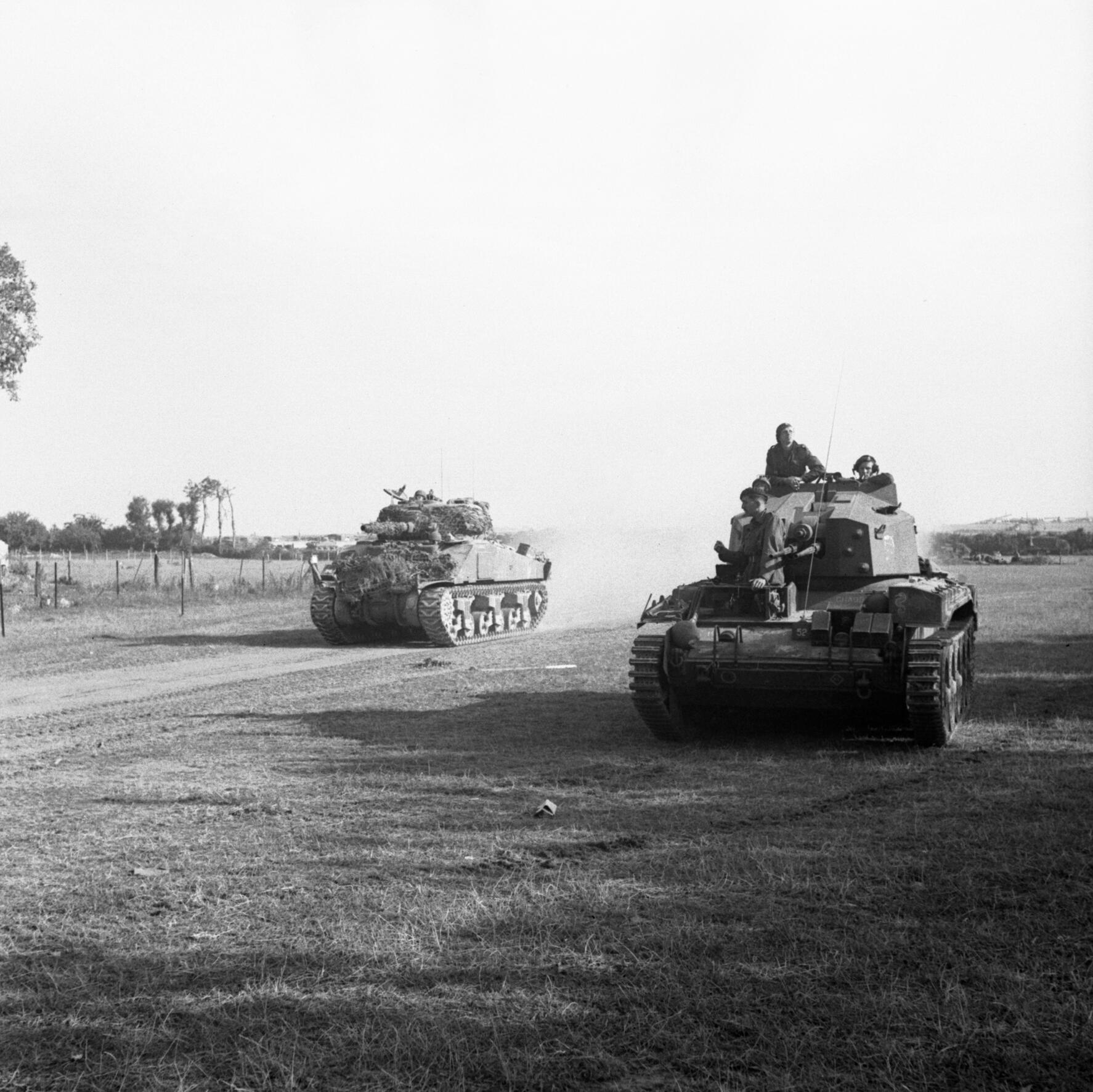
Sherman and Crusader AA Mk III tanks of the Staffordshire Yeomanry during Operation Goodwood, July 1944.

On 18 July, Second Army launched VIII Corps in an armoured thrust out of the Orne bridgehead down the east side of Caen (Operation Goodwood). I Corps' role was to protect the left (east) flank: 3rd Division, supported by 27th Armoured Bde, moving forward at 07.45 behind an artillery barrage. Preliminary bombing had suppressed the defenders of Sannerville and Banneville-la-Campagne, which were in British hands by midday. However, Touffréville was on the edge of the bombed area, and it held out until evening. There was stiff fighting along the road to Troarn, and the village remained in enemy hands when the British halted for reorganisation. Next day, 3rd Division launched four successive attacks with tank support against the village, but it continued to hold out.

II Canadian Corps attacked south from Caen on 25 July in Operation Spring. Again, I Corps provided the left flank protection, with 27th Armoured Bde echeloned behind 3rd Canadian Division. The attack went in before dawn and fighting went on all day. Although Verrières was captured, the advance bogged down against dug-in tanks and counter-attacks, and 3rd Canadian Division's attack failed.

=== DD Training ===
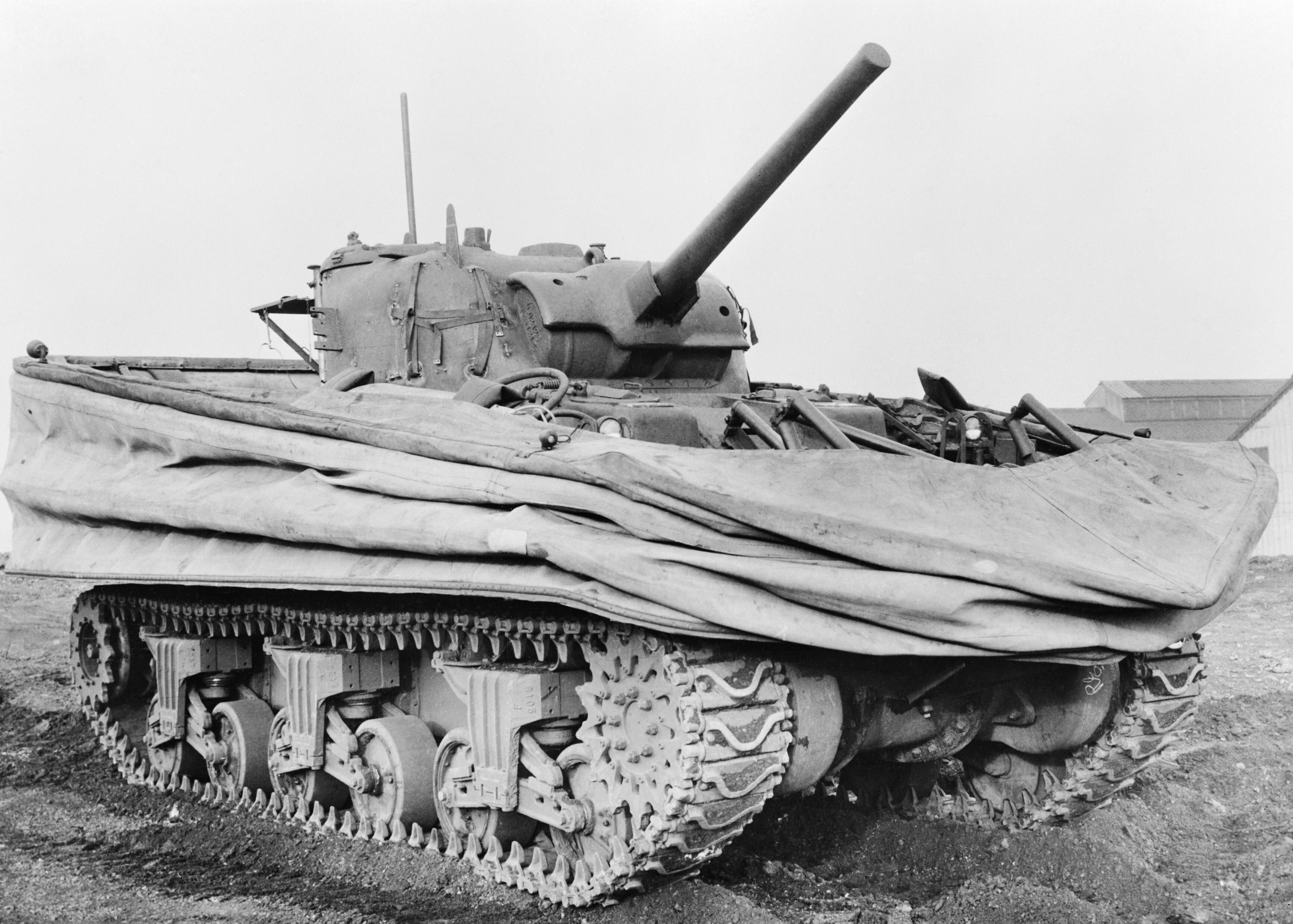
DD Sherman tank with its flotation screen lowered.

Following the heavy casualties so far in the Normandy campaign, 27th Armoured Bde was broken up on 30 July to reinforce other formations. The Staffordshire Yeomanry, however, was sent back to the UK, finally to train on DD tanks. Lieutenant-Col Eadie, having been awarded a Bar to his DSO for his leadership on D-Day, left to become chief instructor at Royal Military College, Sandhurst, and the command was taken over by Lt-Col Mike Farquhar.

79th Armoured Division's formation sign.

After training, the regiment crossed to Belgium where from 17 September 1944 it came under the command of 79th Armoured Division as divisional troops. This division was equipped with specialist armour ('Hobart's Funnies') and assigned its units to other formation as required for specific operations.

=== Scheldt ===
The Staffordshire Yeomanry's first action in its new role came during the Battle of the Scheldt. Operation Vitality was planned to land troops on South Beveland and clear the enemy from the island before the final assault on the fortified island of Walcheren. While 2nd Canadian Division fought its way across the isthmus onto South Beveland, 52nd (Lowland) Division was launched in an amphibious assault in the rear of the defenders. The infantry crossed the 9 miles (14 km) wide estuary in Landing Vehicle Tracked 'Buffaloes', accompanied by B Sqn Staffs Yeomanry, which had completed its DD training. (Note: The Scheldt crossing was the longest 'swim' ever attempted with DD tanks, and was achieved without a single casualty.) Two flotillas set off from Terneuzen at 02.45 on 26 October 1944 to land on 'Green' and 'Amber' beaches. The Buffaloes struggled to mount the slippery dykes, and landings at Green Beach were abandoned to concentrate on Amber. B Squadron's DD Shermans arrived during the morning. They were unable to land at the planned spot, but came ashore in good formation nearby. Unfortunately, the steep overhang of the dyke was too much for the Shermans and only four were able to climb over with the assistance of Buffalo ramps. One DD Sherman collided with a Buffalo and sank, and another broke its final drive on the dyke; the remaining 10 tanks of B Sqn all bogged in the mud. Although the four that succeeded in climbing were able to operate inland, the deep slimy mud of the Polder country limited their effectiveness. Nevertheless, Lt-Gen Guy Simonds commanding II Canadian Corps considered that they had made 'a tremendous difference to the situation in South Beveland'.

=== Rhine ===
During the winter of 1944–45, 79th Armoured Division planned for the projected assault crossing of the Rhine, Operation Plunder. It established G Wing north of Maastricht to train RAC units to operate Buffaloes and DD tanks. The Staffs Yeomanry joined G Wing in January 1945 to continue their DD training. G Wing developed a Buffalo carpet-layer to put down a chestnut paling track to help DD tanks up the steep and muddy banks of the Rhine.

79th Armoured Division assigned the Staffordshire Yeomanry under Lt-Col John Trotter to XXX Corps' landing (Operation Turnscrew), and the regiment rejoined 8th Armoured Bde for this operation. At 17.00 on 23 March the bombardment began and at around 20.30 the assault formations began moving down to the river's edge. The Buffaloes carrying 51st (Highland) Division began crossing at 21.00 under artificial moonlight ('Monty's Moonlight') created by searchlights, and were followed by C Sqn Staffs Yeomanry. There was some incoming shellfire, and one or two tanks had their canvas screens holed and could not take to the water. The DD tanks launched from 'Storm Boat House' and headed for a landing site west of Rees. The Buffalo carpet-laying troop of 4th Royal Tank Regiment laid its tracks, but then discovered a sandbank in the river that would prevent DD tanks approaching the landing site. The troop commander reconnoitred another site and laid his last carpet. The whole of the Staffs Yeomanry now had to land at this one point, but the carpet-laying men worked for eight hours to fill the muddy ruts churned up by the DD Shermans, and the flow of tanks was uninterrupted, the rest of the regiment following C Sqn at first light. The regiment lost three tanks sunk during the crossing, and Maj Charles Eardley led the last squadron to a different launching site to avoid the incoming shellfire. One of the Buffaloes supporting the Staffs Yeomanry carried an airborne bulldozer, which was light enough to cross the mud and then able to reduce the slope of the floodbank and allow the DD tanks to climb over. 5th Cameronians (Scottish Rifles) had been held up in their advance on Mittelburg, but when B Sqn's DD tanks arrived the advance was resumed, the tanks moving by bounds. Approaching the village they came under fire from four or five assault guns among the houses. The Shermans had superior firepower and, supported by the corps artillery, the advance continued until the A/T ditch was reached, when three out of four of the Staffs Yeomanry's tanks were knocked out. German resistance was hardening in the defended villages around Rees. The regiment supported 1st Black Watch and 7th Argyll and Sutherland Highlanders in their unsuccessful attacks against Speldrop and Bienen respectively. It took another couple of days to clear the area around Rees.

Tank ferries later brought over the rest of 8th Armoured Bde, which supported 51st (H) Division and other elements of XXX Corps in a week-long battle to expand and break out from the bridgehead. The Staffs Yeomanry supported the Nova Scotia Highlanders of 9th Canadian Brigade: his troop leader having been killed, Sergeant Benjamin Hudson commanded the troop that led the Highlanders into Bienen. Hudson's tank had engine trouble, so he dismounted to direct the remaining two tanks into position, when they were attacked by two Panther tanks. One of the Shermans was destroyed, but Hudson went back on foot to bring up self-propelled guns to hold the position. Finally, on 30 March, 8th Armoured Bde was launched in Operation Forrard On, the breakout battle and pursuit of the defeated Germans. The Staffs Yeomanry were left behind in the bridgehead.

=== Germany ===
On 5 April, the regiment was sent forward to assist 3rd Division, which was engaging the enemy holding out in villages round Lingen, south of Bremen. A troop gave fire support to a half-squadron of Churchill Crocodile flamethowing tanks leading the 2nd Lincolnshire Regiment into Lingen. On 15 April, the Staffs Yeomanry was temporarily attached to 8th Armoured Bde once more.

Then, on 17 April, the regiment joined 31st Armoured Bde within 79th Armoured Division and the next day it was sent away to join XII Corps for Operation Enterprise, the crossing of the River Elbe. This was the last assault crossing carried out in the North-West Europe Campaign, and the last use of DD tanks. The counter-battery bombardment began at midnight on 28/29 April, and at 02.00 two brigades of 15th (Scottish) Infantry Division set out in Buffaloes, followed at 05.00 by A Sqn, Staffs Yeomanry, crossing from Artlenburg. The DD Shermans suffered no casualties in the crossing, and were first used to clear felled trees blocking the only two exits from the riverbank, which had defeated an airborne bulldozer landed from a Buffalo. The Staffords then went on to give fire support to 46th (Highland) Bde and 1st Commando Bde as they fought their way up the steep hillside and inland from the river. The squadron attached two troops to each advancing battalion of 46th (H) Bde. By evening, the tanks and infantry had reached Wangelau and Basedow, some 5 miles (8.0 km) north of their crossing points. Early next morning, the 9th Cameronians holding Basedow came under heavy attack and began running short of ammunition. At the time, the squadron of Staffs Yeomanry were formed up with another battalion to resume the advance: at 07.00 they were sent to help the Cameronians, and soon eased the pressure, though the enemy kept attacking until 11.00.

The attack at Basedow was the last sustained counter-attack on 15th (S) Division's front. The Elbe bridgehead was rapidly expanded and the troops advanced through the Sachsenwald in the direction of Lübeck. Hostilities ended with the German surrender at Lüneburg Heath on 4 May.

After VE Day, the regiment continued serving in 79th Armoured Division as part of British Army of the Rhine (BAOR). The Staffordshire Yeomanry passed into suspended animation in BAOR on 1 March 1946.

== Postwar ==
When the TA was reconstituted on 1 January 1947, the regiment reformed at Stafford, still as an armoured regiment, affiliated to 16th/5th The Queen's Royal Lancers in the Regular Army. It formed part of 23 Independent Armoured Brigade in Western Command.

The TA was reduced into the Territorial and Army Volunteer Reserve (TAVR) in 1967, when the regiment absorbed some Staffordshire Royal Artillery (RA) and Royal Engineers (RE) units to form an infantry regiment in TAVR III (Home Defence) under its traditional title of Staffordshire Yeomanry (Queen's Own Royal Regiment). However, the new unit was reduced to a cadre in 1969.

The cadre was disbanded on 12 April 1971 and reformed as B (Staffordshire Yeomanry) Squadron of the new Mercian Yeomanry (renamed the Queen's Own Mercian Yeomanry in 1973).

== Battle honours ==
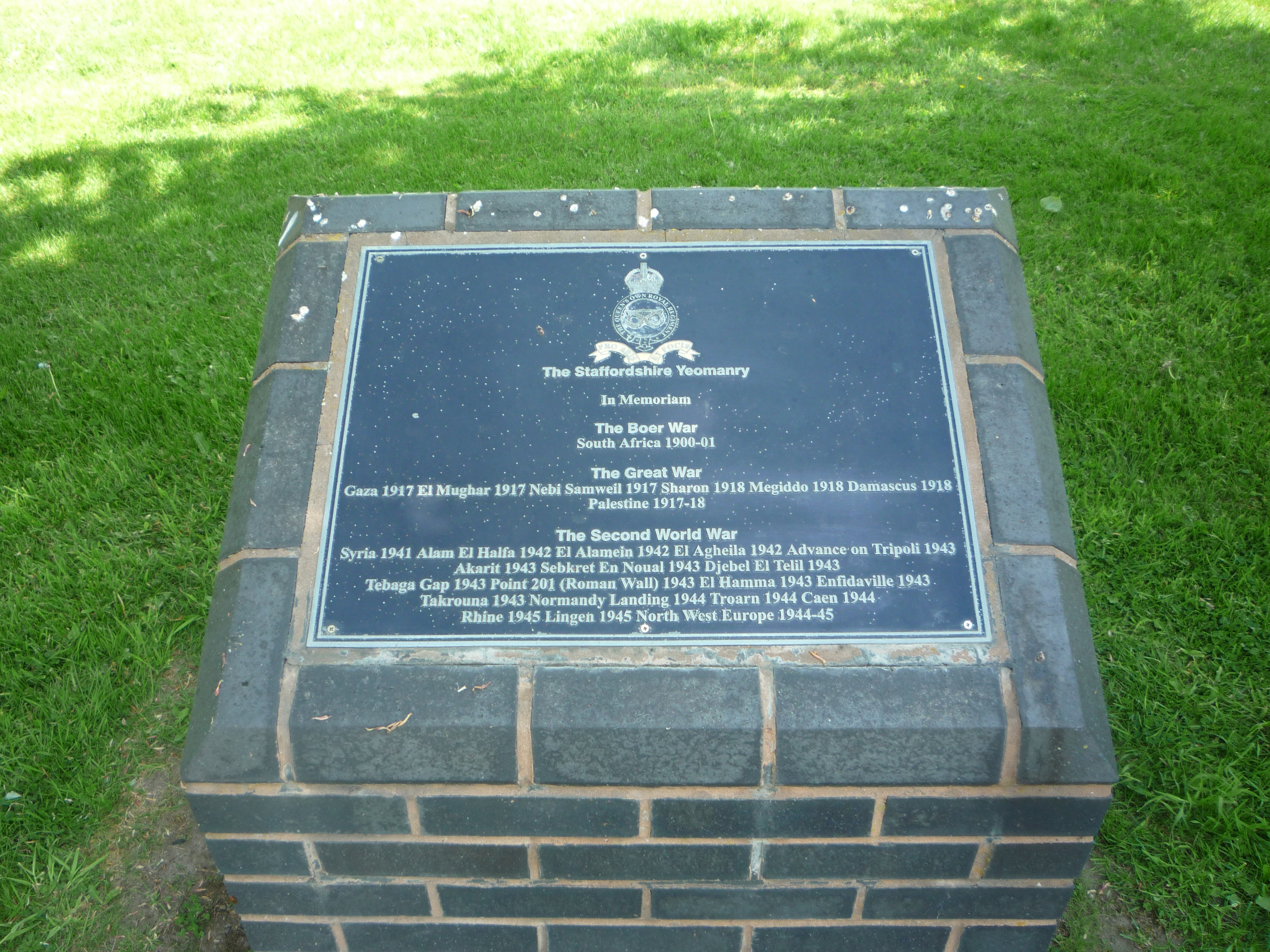
The Staffordshire Yeomanry memorial at the National Memorial Arboretum.

The Staffordshire Yeomanry was awarded the following Battle honours for its service during the Second World War:
Syria 1941; Alam el Halfa, El Alamein, El Agheila, Advance on Tripoli, Tebaga Gap, Point 201 (Roman Wall), El Hamma, Akarit, Sebkret en Noual, Djebel el Telil, Enfidaville, Takrouna, North Africa 1942–43; Normandy Landing, Caen, Troarn, Rhine, Lingen, North-West Europe 1944–45.

An 'In Memoriam' tablet to the Staffordshire Yeomanry in the grounds of the National Memorial Arboretum at Alrewas, near Lichfield, lists all of the regiment's battle honours.
