= Basedow =

Basedow may refer to:

== Places ==
- Basedow, Mecklenburg-Vorpommern, in the district of Demmin, Mecklenburg-Vorpommern, Germany
- Basedow, Schleswig-Holstein, in the district of Lauenburg, Schleswig-Holstein, Germany

== People ==
- Johann Bernhard Basedow (1724-1790), German educational reformer
- John Basedow, American television personality and motivational speaker
- Karl Adolph von Basedow (1799-1854), German doctor who described the Graves-Basedow disease
- M. P. F. Basedow or "Hon. F. Basedow" (1829–1902), Australian teacher, newspaper proprietor and politician
- Herbert Basedow (1881–1933), Australian anthropologist, geologist, explorer and medical practitioner
- Rainer Basedow (1938-2022), German film, television, and voice actor

== Other ==
- Graves' disease, in continental Europe called Graves-Basedow or just Basedow disease and informally shortened just to "Basedow"
