= Lanza =

Lanza is an Italian surname meaning "spear" or "lance".

Lanza may also refer to:

== People ==
=== Surname ===
- Adam Lanza (1992–2012), perpetrator of the Sandy Hook Elementary School shooting
- Alcides Lanza (1929–2024), Canadian composer
- Andrew Lanza (born 1964), New York State senator
- Angela Lanza, American singer
- Beatrice Lanza (born 1982), Italian athlete
- Cesare Lanza (born 1942), Italian journalist and author
- Chuck Lanza (born 1964), NFL player
- Clara Lanza (1858–1939), American author
- Cosimo Damiano Lanza (born 1962), Italian pianist, harpsichordist and composer
- Damián Lanza (born 1982), Ecuadorian footballer
- Francesco "Frank" Lanza (died 1937), first crime boss of the Lanza crime family
- Giovanni Lanza (1810–1882), Italian politician
- Giuseppe Lanza, 17th century Sicilian nobleman
- Jack Lanza (aka Blackjack Lanza) (1935-2021), wrestler
- James Lanza (1902–2006), Italian-American mobster better known as 'Jimmy the Hat'
- Jessy Lanza (born 1985), Canadian musician
- Joseph Lanza (1904–1968), New York labor racketeer and member of the Genovese crime family
- Laura Lanza (1529–1563), noblewoman in Sicily and murder victim
- Mario Lanza (1921–1959), American actor and opera singer
- Nimal Lanza (born 1974), Sri Lankan politician
- Pietro Lanza di Scalea (1863–1938), Italian noble and politician
- Robert Lanza (born 1956), American scientist

=== Given name ===
- Lanza del Vasto (1901–1981), Italian philosopher and activist.

== Geography ==
- Lanza, a frazione of Rumo, Trentino
- Lanza (Milan Metro), station of Milan Metro
- Lanzarote, one of the Canary Islands

== See also ==
- Lancia (disambiguation)
- Lanze, German municipality in Schleswig-Holstein
- Lanzo (disambiguation)
