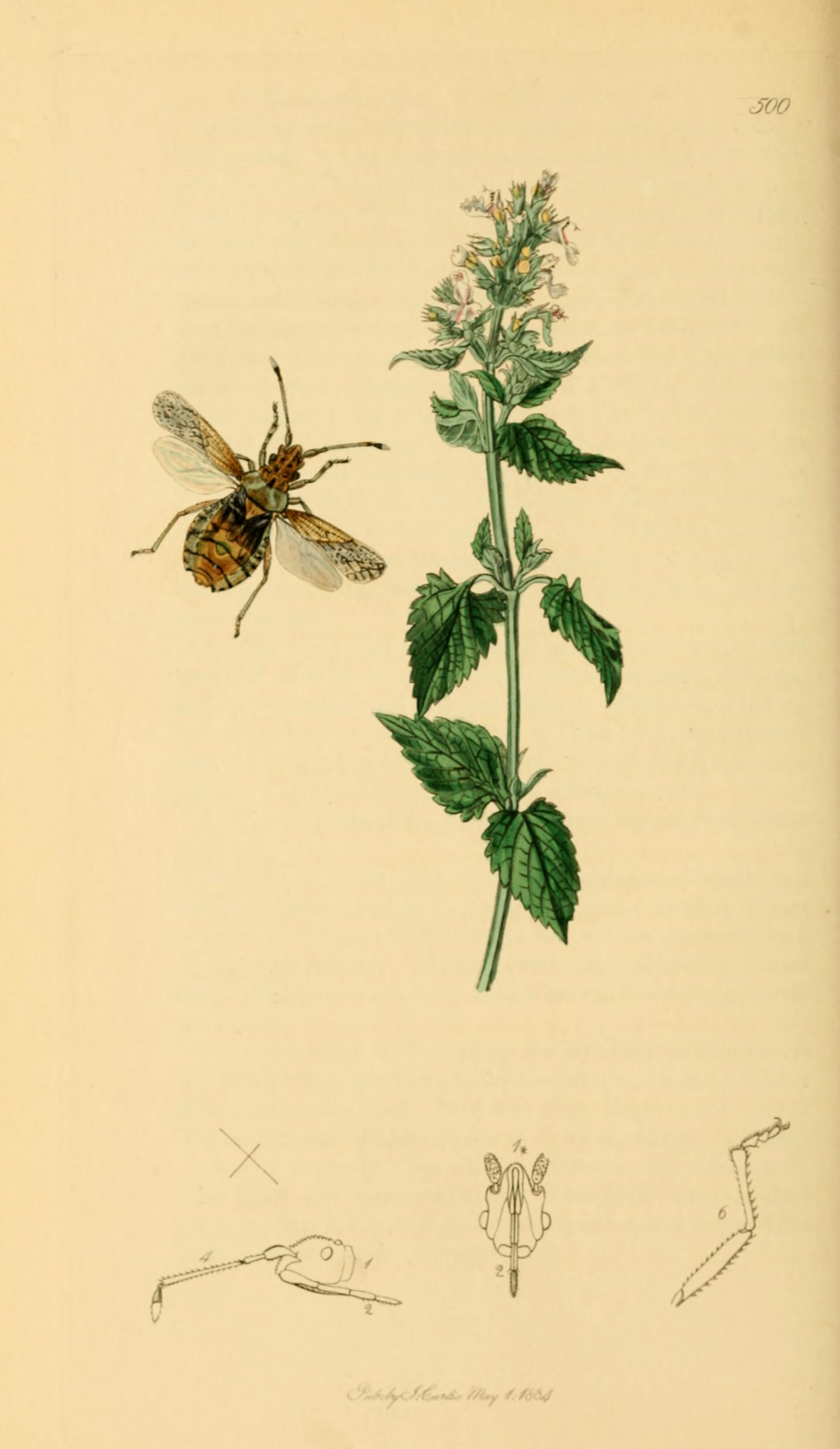
- Arenocoris fallenii in British Entomology by John Curtis

Scientific classification
- Domain: Eukaryota
- Kingdom: Animalia
- Phylum: Arthropoda
- Class: Insecta
- Order: Hemiptera
- Suborder: Heteroptera
- Family: Coreidae
- Subfamily: Pseudophloeinae
- Tribe: Pseudophloeini
- Genus: Arenocoris; Hahn, 1834

= Arenocoris =

Genus of true bugs

Arenocoris is a genus of true bug in the family Coreidae.

== Species ==
These four species belong to the genus Arenocoris:

- Arenocoris fallenii (Schilling, 1829)
- Arenocoris intermedius (Jakovlev, 1883)
- Arenocoris latissimus Seidenstucker, 1960
- Arenocoris waltlii (Herrich-Schäffer, 1835)
