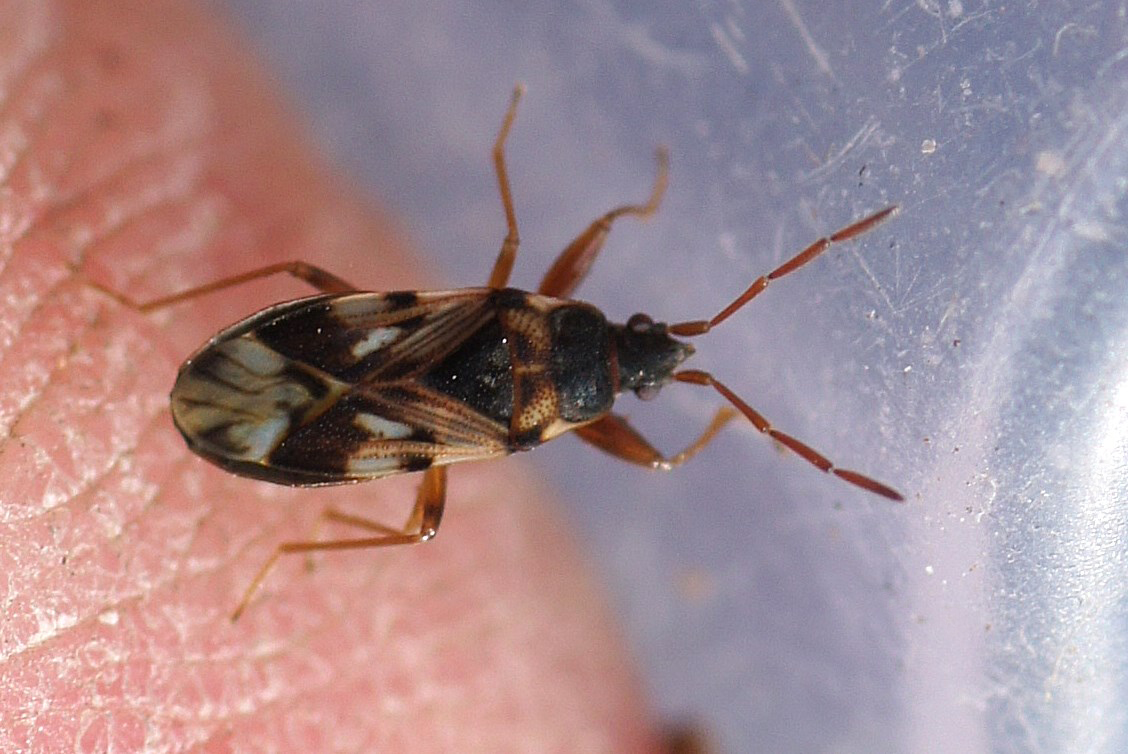
- Scolopostethus pictus, Netherlands

Scientific classification
- Kingdom: Animalia
- Phylum: Arthropoda
- Clade: Pancrustacea
- Class: Insecta
- Order: Hemiptera
- Suborder: Heteroptera
- Family: Rhyparochromidae
- Subfamily: Rhyparochrominae
- Tribe: Drymini
- Genus: Scolopostethus
- Species: S. pictus

Binomial name
- Scolopostethus pictus (Schilling, 1829)

= Scolopostethus pictus =

Species of dirt-colored seed bug

Scolopostethus pictus is a species of dirt-colored seed bug in the family Rhyparochromidae, found in Europe and western Asia.

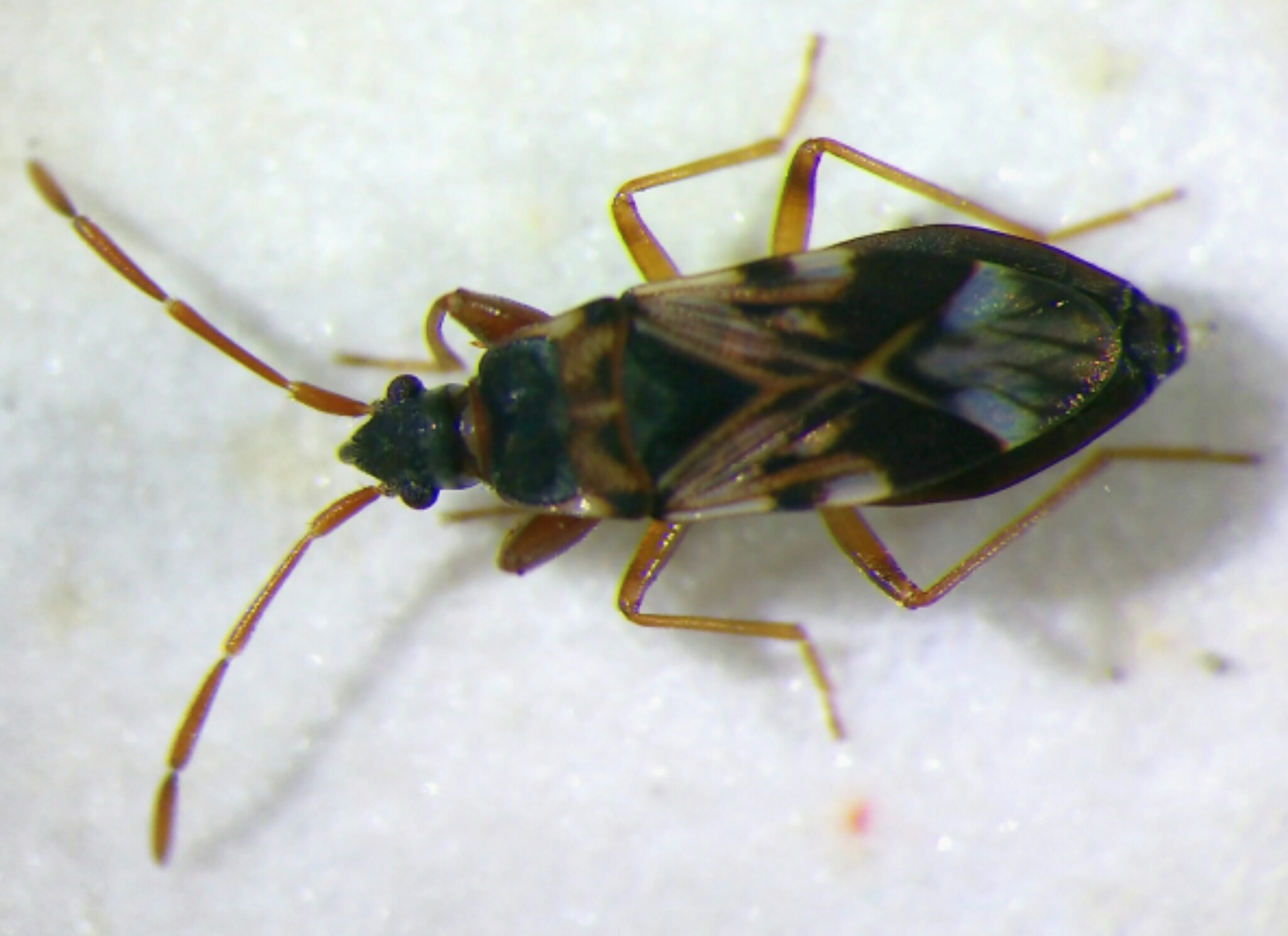
Scolopostethus pictus, Österreich

== Subspecies ==
These three subspecies belong to the species Scolopostethus pictus:

- Scolopostethus pictus antennalis Horvath, 1882
- Scolopostethus pictus pictus (Schilling, 1829)
- Scolopostethus pictus testaceus Roubal, 1958
