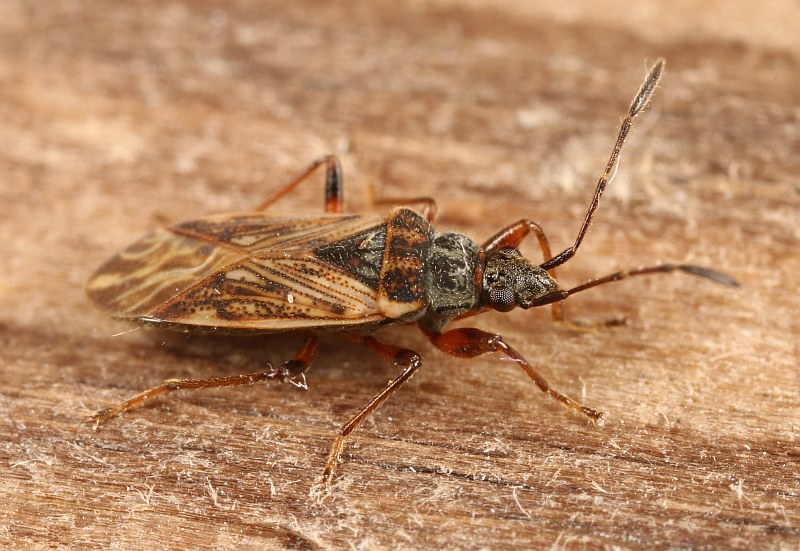

Scientific classification
- Kingdom: Animalia
- Phylum: Arthropoda
- Clade: Pancrustacea
- Class: Insecta
- Order: Hemiptera
- Suborder: Heteroptera
- Family: Rhyparochromidae
- Genus: Pachybrachius
- Species: P. fracticollis

Binomial name
- Pachybrachius fracticollis (Schilling, 1829)

= Pachybrachius fracticollis =

Species of true bug

Pachybrachius fracticollis is a species of dirt-colored seed bug in the family Rhyparochromidae. It is found in Europe and Northern Asia (excluding China) and North America.

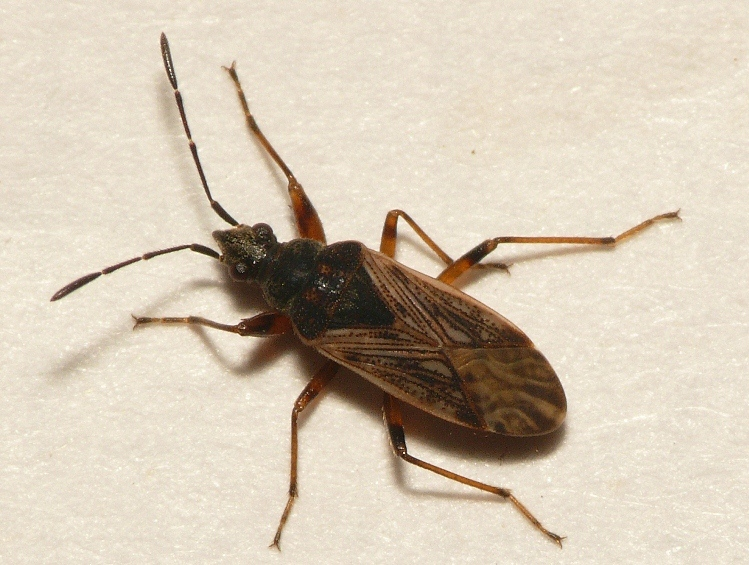

== Subspecies ==
These three subspecies belong to the species Pachybrachius fracticollis:

- Pachybrachius fracticollis collaris (Baerensprung, 1859)
- Pachybrachius fracticollis fracticollis (Schilling, 1829)
- Pachybrachius fracticollis tridens Roubal, 1959
