= Lanzo =

Lanzo may refer to:

== Medicine ==
- Lansoprazole, a proton-pump inhibitor. Its Swedish brand name is "Lanzo"

== Geography ==
- Lanzo d'Intelvi, a frazione in the municipality of Alta Valle Intelvi, Province of Como, Lombardy, Italy
- Lanzo Torinese, a municipality in the Province of Turin, Piedmont, Italy
- Monastero di Lanzo, a municipality in the Province of Turin, Piedmont, Italy
- Stura di Lanzo, a river in Piedmont, Italy

== See also ==
- Lanza, disambiguation page
- Lanze, a German municipality in Schleswig-Holstein
