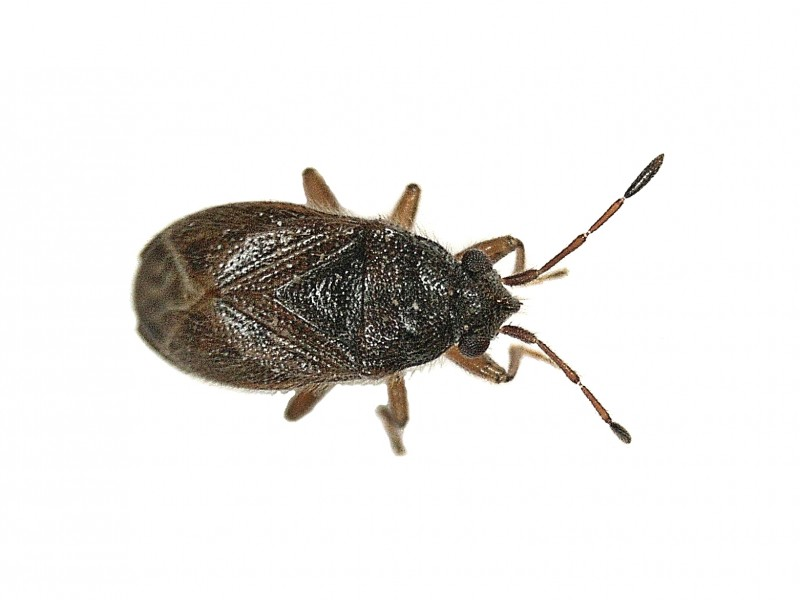

Scientific classification
- Domain: Eukaryota
- Kingdom: Animalia
- Phylum: Arthropoda
- Class: Insecta
- Order: Hemiptera
- Suborder: Heteroptera
- Family: Rhyparochromidae
- Genus: Stygnocoris
- Species: S. sabulosus

Binomial name
- Stygnocoris sabulosus (Schilling, 1829)

= Stygnocoris sabulosus =

Species of true bug

Stygnocoris sabulosus is a species of dirt-colored seed bug in the family Rhyparochromidae. It is found in Africa, Europe and Northern Asia (excluding China), and North America.

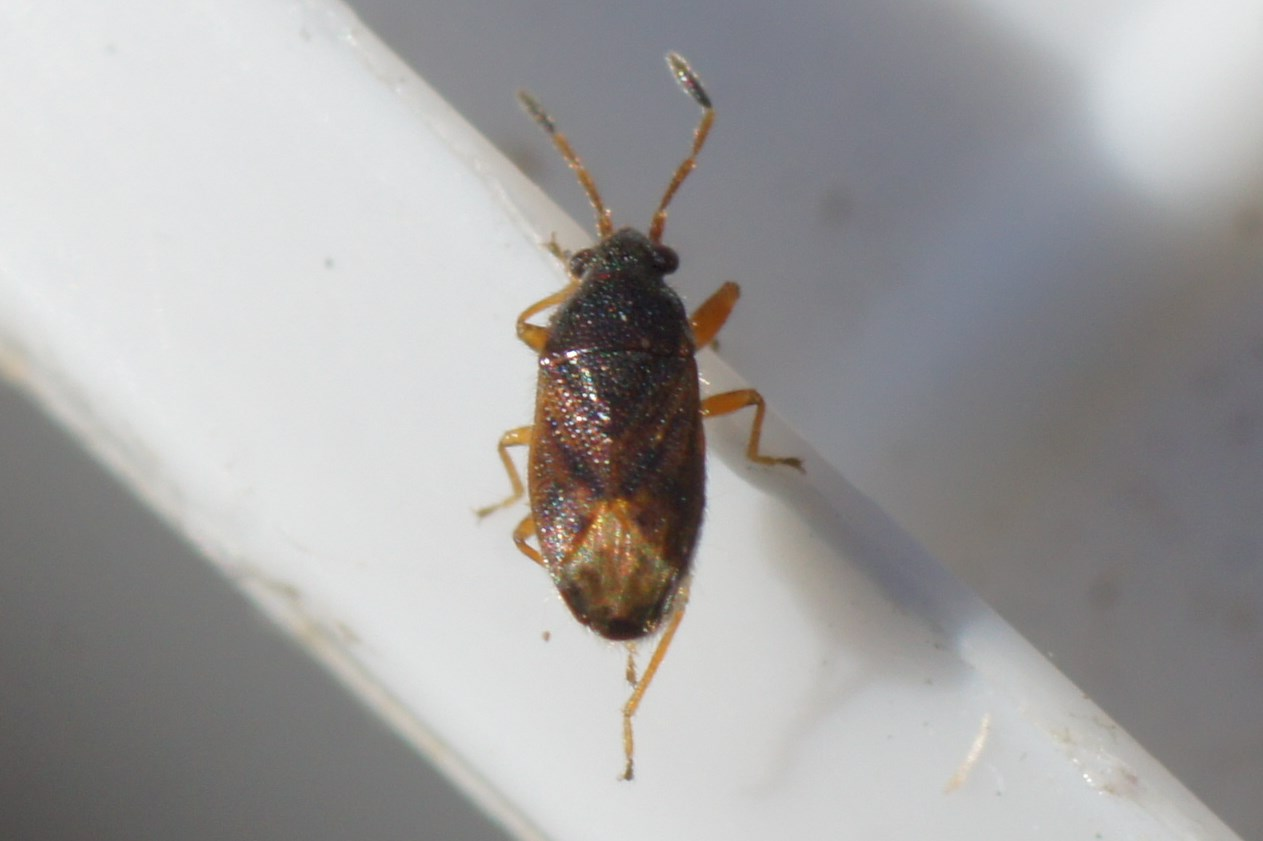
