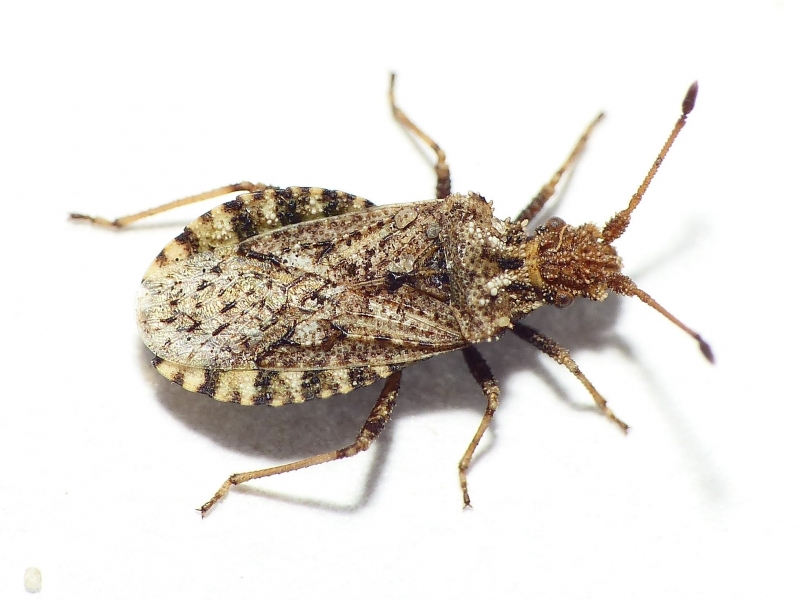

Scientific classification
- Domain: Eukaryota
- Kingdom: Animalia
- Phylum: Arthropoda
- Class: Insecta
- Order: Hemiptera
- Suborder: Heteroptera
- Family: Coreidae
- Genus: Arenocoris
- Species: A. fallenii

Binomial name
- Arenocoris fallenii (Schilling, 1829)

= Arenocoris fallenii =

Species of true bug

Arenocoris fallenii is a herbivorous species of true bug in the family Coreidae. It is a small, speckled, variably coloured insect, between 6 and 7 mm long as an adult.
