= Lutz Reinstrom =

German murderer known as (born 1948)

- Born: 29 March 1948 (age 78); Sassnitz, Allied-occupied Germany
- Other name: "The Acid Killer"
- Conviction: Murder
- Penalty: Life imprisonment

Details
- Victims: 2
- Span of crimes: 1986–1988
- Country: West Germany
- Date apprehended: 17 September 1991

Lutz Reinstrom (born 29 March 1948) is a German murderer known as The Acid Killer. He has been in custody since 17 September 1991 and was sentenced on 22 May 1996 by the Hamburg Regional Court for the murder of two women, attempted robbery coinciding with deprivation of liberty and extortionate robbery to life imprisonment followed by preventative detention. He is serving his sentence in a high-security Hamburg prison.

== The crimes ==
The sadomasochistically inclined furrier had built an underground "nuclear bunker" on the property of his terraced house on Dompfaffenweg in Rahlstedt in 1983. In there he kidnapped 61-year-old Hildegard K., the wife of his teacher, on 12 March 1986. As well as kidnapping her, he took money and jewellery worth a total of about 40,000 Deutsche Mark. He tortured the woman before he killed and dismembered her after a week had passed.

On 5 October 1988, Reinstrom locked 31-year-old Annegret B. in the dungeon. He cleared her accounts, tortured and abused her sexually, recording her torture on tape and photos until he killed and dismembered her after about four weeks.

Outside the basement, Reinstrom led the life of a blameless and affable family man. Although the police, at the behest of Annegret's mother, an acquaintance of her daughter and a potential whistleblower, interviewed Reinstrom, but due to the fact that he knew the interviewing police officer from a swimming club they attended, he persuaded the man that he knew nothing and further investigations were omitted. Presumably, Annegret was still alive at the time. Reinstrom had forced his victims to write farewell letters and postcards to their relatives, which were gradually sent from abroad: they wanted to start a new life abroad and no longer wanted any contact. Subsequently, it was recognized that the victims had hidden cries for help in some of the cards.

On 6 September 1991, Reinstrom kidnapped 53-year-old Christa S., his teacher's new partner, from her own car and dragged her into his bunker using a stun gun. He handcuffed her and showed her perverse torture photographs of Annegret. Reinstrom demanded 300,000 marks in ransom. However, since the transfer was delayed and his wife had prematurely come home from vacation, he gave up his plan and took Christa to the police station in Langenhorn on September 13.

== Discoveries ==
Reinstrom was then arrested on 17 September 1991, and sentenced on 26 May 1992 to three years imprisonment for extortion and robbery. At the trial, detective Atzeroth-Freier testified. She was brought in on the night of 13–14 September, to bring Christa S. home after her police interrogation. In a break from negotiations, the officer was approached by the mother of Annegret. She reported the disappearance of her daughter, who was a friend of Reinstrom. Atzeroth-Freier then requested the authorities to interrogate the victims' relatives, make lists of items they had lost and, in part of their spare time, determine that the homicide division to which they belonged investigated their disappearances, as the three cases had striking parallels.

During the search of Reinstrom's weekend property in Basedow and in Rahlstedt, the body-tracking dogs at first were unable to locate any body parts. On 21 November 1992, at the Dompfaffenweg, five canisters of hydrochloric acid were found. Neighbours in Basedow reported that Reinstrom had dug a deep pit there sometime after Annegret's disappearance. When the police approached it with heavy equipment, on 1 December 1992, they were able to recover a barrel full of human remains. Confronted with this, Reinstrom informed the police that he had buried the corpse of Hildegard in an acid barrel in Dompfaffenweg, which was seized on 4 December 1992.

== Trial ==
The main trial before the jury under chairman Gerhard Schaberg began on 10 January 1995. The accused Reinstrom denied any guilt in the death of the two women and on the recommendation of his three defenders (Leonore Gottschalk-Solger, Klaus Martini and Uwe Maeffert), he largely remained silent. He claimed that an "organ mafia" killed women to obtain transplant material, or that Hildegard, unfortunately, had broken her neck while falling down the stairs. Finally, he claimed that Annegret had died in the sauna when, after consensual sexual intercourse, she had bitten his penis violently, so that he pushed her no less violently and left her to bleed and take care of the bleeding limb in the sauna. The jury found it necessary to commission the medical examiner Klaus Püschel with the investigation of the defendant on any bite injuries.

After 93 days of negotiations, on 22 May 1996, the jury handed down a sentence containing the most severe penalties foreseen in German criminal law: life imprisonment for a special severity of guilt and preventative detention. Unlike the case of Annegret, in the case of Hildegard, the court found it impossible to have been killed for sexual reasons; Reinstrom had killed out of murder lust or for satisfaction of his sexual urges, but to be regarded as proven, the killing was made out at least out of greed and to cover a criminal offence.

== Literature ==
- Heinrich Thies: Cries for help from the torture cellar. The Hamburg acid barrel murders. Jump: to Klampen 2014, ISBN 978-3-86674-400-4.
