= Schnakenbek =

- Municipality
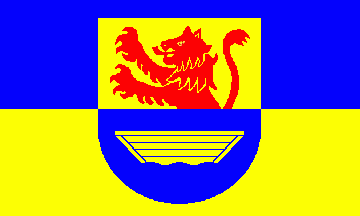
- Flag Coat of arms

- Location of Schnakenbek within Herzogtum Lauenburg district
- Interactive map of Schnakenbek
- Location within Germany Location within Schleswig-Holstein
- Coordinates: 53°23′N 10°30′E
- Country: Germany
- State: Schleswig-Holstein
- District: Herzogtum Lauenburg
- Municipal assoc.: Lütau

Government
  - Mayor: Wolfgang Fechner

Area
  - Total: 13.02 km^{2} (5.03 sq mi)
- Elevation: 27 m (89 ft)

Population (2025-12-31)
  - Total: 894
  - Density: 68.7/km^{2} (178/sq mi)
- Time zone: UTC+01:00 (CET)
  - Summer (DST): UTC+02:00 (CEST)
- Postal codes: 21481
- Dialling codes: 04153
- Vehicle registration: RZ
- Website: www.lauenburg.de

Schnakenbek (German pronunciation: [ˈʃnaːkn̩beːk]) is a municipality in the district of Lauenburg, in Schleswig-Holstein, Germany.
