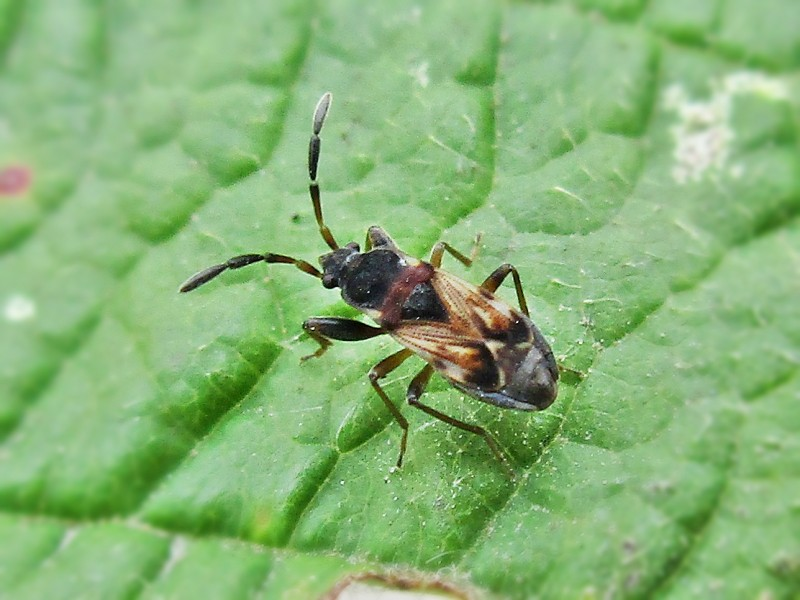

Scientific classification
- Kingdom: Animalia
- Phylum: Arthropoda
- Class: Insecta
- Order: Hemiptera
- Suborder: Heteroptera
- Family: Rhyparochromidae
- Genus: Scolopostethus
- Species: S. thomsoni

Binomial name
- Scolopostethus thomsoni Reuter, 1874

= Scolopostethus thomsoni =

Species of true bug

Scolopostethus thomsoni is a species of dirt-colored seed bug in the family Rhyparochromidae. It is found in Africa, Europe and Northern Asia (excluding China), and North America.

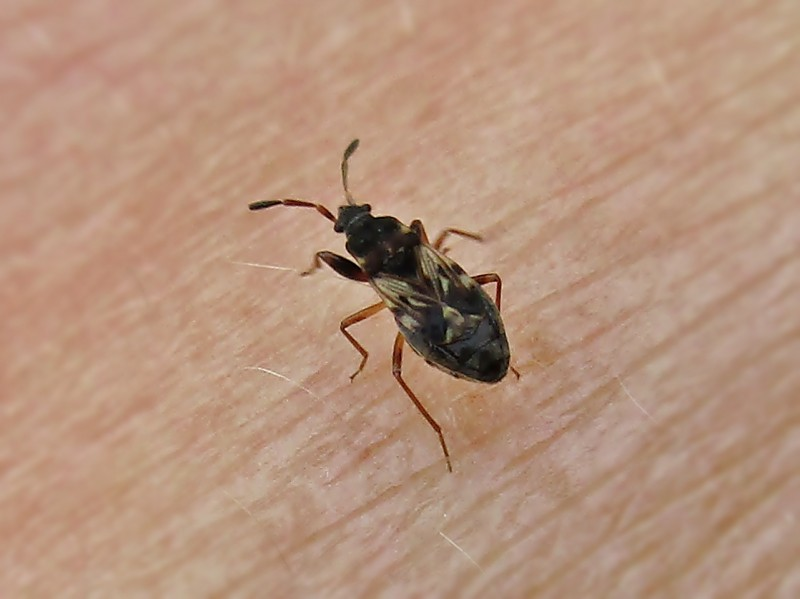

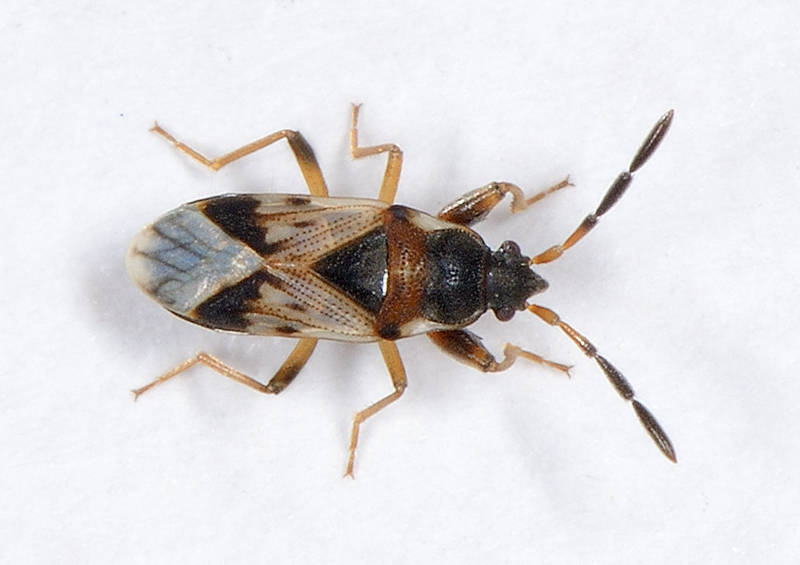
