= Scolopostethus pacificus =

Scientific classification
- Domain: Eukaryota
- Kingdom: Animalia
- Phylum: Arthropoda
- Class: Insecta
- Order: Hemiptera
- Suborder: Heteroptera
- Family: Rhyparochromidae
- Tribe: Drymini
- Genus: Scolopostethus
- Species: S. pacificus

Binomial name
- Scolopostethus pacificus Barber, 1918

Species of true bug

Scolopostethus pacificus is a species of dirt-colored seed bug in the family Rhyparochromidae. It is found in North America.
