= Lancia (disambiguation) =

Lancia is an Italian manufacturer of cars and other vehicles.

Lancia may also refer to:

- Manfred I Lancia (fl. 1160–1214), poet, Margrave of Busca
- Bianca Lancia (1200–1233), consort of Frederick II
- Vincenzo Lancia (1881–1937), Italian engineer, founded the car manufacturer
- Gianni Lancia (1924–2014), Italian automobile engineer, son of Vincenzo Lancia
- Lancia (moth), a genus of moths

== See also ==
- Lancea (disambiguation)
- Lanza (disambiguation)
