= Dalldorf =

- Municipality
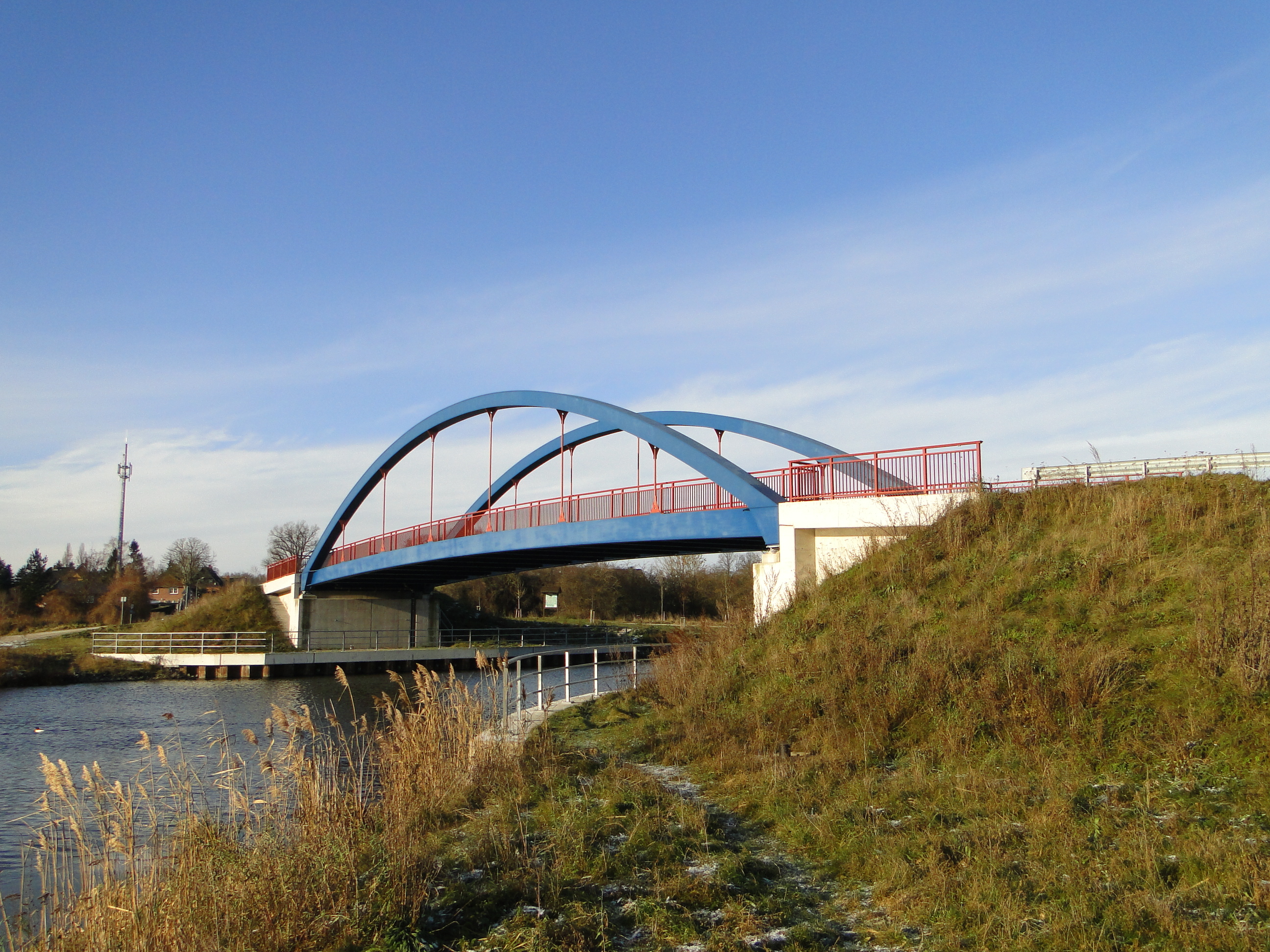
- Bridge over the Elbe–Lübeck Canal in Dalldorf

- Flag Coat of arms

- Location of Dalldorf within Herzogtum Lauenburg district
- Interactive map of Dalldorf
- Location within Germany Location within Schleswig-Holstein
- Coordinates: 53°26′N 10°37′E
- Country: Germany
- State: Schleswig-Holstein
- District: Herzogtum Lauenburg
- Municipal assoc.: Lütau

Government
  - Mayor: Michael Götsch (CDU)

Area
  - Total: 6.05 km^{2} (2.34 sq mi)
- Elevation: 14 m (46 ft)

Population (2025-12-31)
  - Total: 352
  - Density: 58.2/km^{2} (151/sq mi)
- Time zone: UTC+01:00 (CET)
  - Summer (DST): UTC+02:00 (CEST)
- Postal codes: 21483
- Dialling codes: 04155
- Vehicle registration: RZ
- Website: www.lauenburg.de

Dalldorf is a municipality in the district of Lauenburg in Schleswig-Holstein in Germany.
