= Lancea =

Lancea may refer to:

- Lancea (weapon), the Roman auxiliaries' short javelin
- Lancea (plant), a plant genus in the order Lamiales

== See also ==
- Lancia (disambiguation)
