= Krukow, Schleswig-Holstein =

Krukow
- Municipality
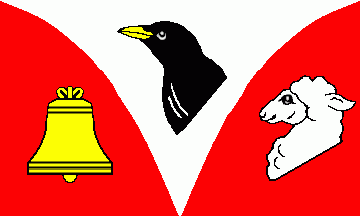
- Flag Coat of arms

- Location of Krukow within Herzogtum Lauenburg district
- Interactive map of Krukow
- Location within Germany Location within Schleswig-Holstein
- Coordinates: 53°25′N 10°29′E
- Country: Germany
- State: Schleswig-Holstein
- District: Herzogtum Lauenburg
- Municipal assoc.: Lütau

Government
  - Mayor: Ludwig Grimm

Area
  - Total: 7.94 km^{2} (3.07 sq mi)
- Elevation: 44 m (144 ft)

Population (2025-12-31)
  - Total: 163
  - Density: 20.5/km^{2} (53.2/sq mi)
- Time zone: UTC+01:00 (CET)
  - Summer (DST): UTC+02:00 (CEST)
- Postal codes: 21483
- Dialling codes: 04153
- Vehicle registration: RZ
- Website: krukow.de

Krukow (German pronunciation: [ˈkʁuːkoː]) is a municipality in the district of Lauenburg, in Schleswig-Holstein, Germany.
