= Lütau (Amt) =

- Amt
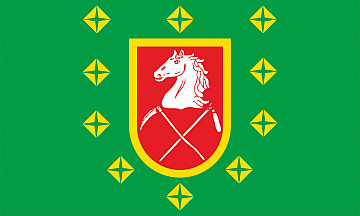
- Flag Coat of arms

- Map of Lauenburg highlighting Lütau
- Interactive map of Lütau
- Location within Germany Location within Schleswig-Holstein
- Coordinates: 53°26′N 10°33′E
- Country: Germany
- State: Schleswig-Holstein
- District: Lauenburg
- Seat: Lauenburg
- Subdivisions: 10 municipalities

Government
  - Mayor: Gerd Lüttge

Area
  - Total: 80.74 km^{2} (31.17 sq mi)

Population (2025-12-31)
  - Total: 3,858
  - Density: 47.78/km^{2} (123.8/sq mi)
- Time zone: UTC+01:00 (CET)
  - Summer (DST): UTC+02:00 (CEST)
- Website: amt-luetau.de

Lütau is an Amt ("collective municipality") in the district of Lauenburg, in Schleswig-Holstein, Germany. Its seat is in Lauenburg/Elbe, itself not part of the Amt.

The Amt Lütau consists of the following municipalities:

1. Basedow
2. Buchhorst
3. Dalldorf
4. Juliusburg
5. Krukow
6. Krüzen
7. Lanze
8. Lütau
9. Schnakenbek
10. Wangelau
