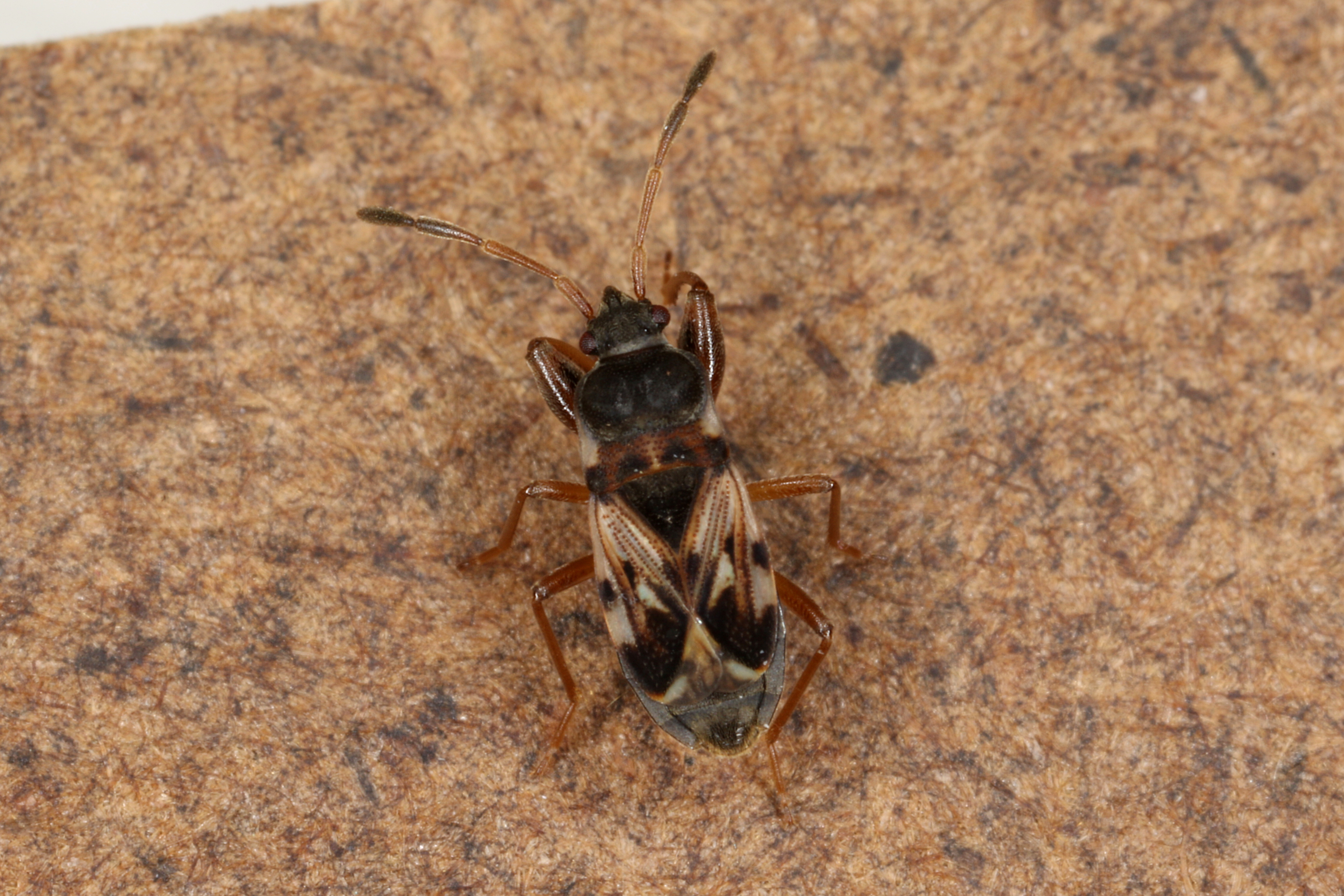
- Scolopostethus affinis

Scientific classification
- Kingdom: Animalia
- Phylum: Arthropoda
- Class: Insecta
- Order: Hemiptera
- Suborder: Heteroptera
- Family: Rhyparochromidae
- Subfamily: Rhyparochrominae
- Tribe: Drymini
- Genus: Scolopostethus; Fieber, 1861

= Scolopostethus =

Genus of true bugs

Scolopostethus is a genus of dirt-colored seed bugs in the family Rhyparochromidae. There are more than 30 described species in Scolopostethus.

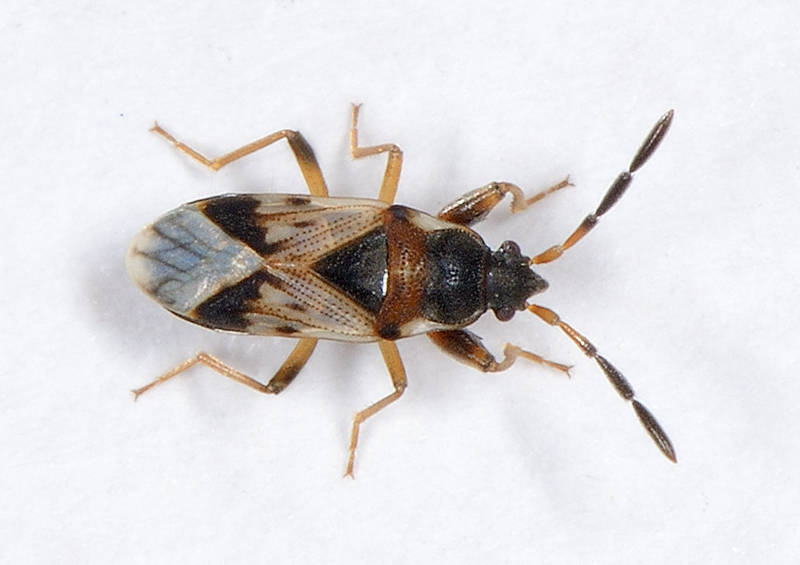
Scolopostethus thomsoni

== Species ==
These 34 species belong to the genus Scolopostethus:

- Scolopostethus abdominalis Jakovlev, 1890
- Scolopostethus affinis (Schilling, 1829)
- Scolopostethus afropunctulatus Scudder, 1962
- Scolopostethus atlanticus Horvath, 1893
- Scolopostethus chinensis Zheng & Zou, 1981
- Scolopostethus cognatus Fieber, 1861
- Scolopostethus coleoptratus Slater, 1993
- Scolopostethus daulius Linnavuori, 1978
- Scolopostethus decoratus (Hahn, 1833)
- Scolopostethus diffidens Horvath, 1893
- Scolopostethus eros Linnavuori, 1978
- Scolopostethus grandis Horvath, 1880
- Scolopostethus hirsutus Zheng & Zou, 1987
- Scolopostethus kilimandjariensis Scudder, 1962
- Scolopostethus lethierryi Jakovlev, 1877
- Scolopostethus maderensis Reuter, 1881
- Scolopostethus maumus Scudder, 1962
- Scolopostethus merus Scudder, 1962
- Scolopostethus montanus (Distant, 1909)
- Scolopostethus morimotoi (Hidaka, 1964)
- Scolopostethus ornandus Distant, 1904
- Scolopostethus pacificus Barber, 1918
- Scolopostethus patruelis Horvath, 1892
- Scolopostethus pictus (Schilling, 1829)
- Scolopostethus pilosus Reuter, 1874
- Scolopostethus pseudograndis Wagner, 1950
- Scolopostethus puberulus Horvath, 1887
- Scolopostethus quadratus Zheng & Zou, 1981
- Scolopostethus silvicolus Linnavuori, 1978
- Scolopostethus takeyai Hidaka, 1963
- Scolopostethus thomsoni Reuter, 1874
- Scolopostethus tropicus (Distant, 1893)
- Scolopostethus ulugurus Scudder, 1962
- † Scolopostethus statzi Wagner, 1950
