= Pachybrachius luridus =

Scientific classification
- Kingdom: Animalia
- Phylum: Arthropoda
- Clade: Pancrustacea
- Class: Insecta
- Order: Hemiptera
- Suborder: Heteroptera
- Family: Rhyparochromidae
- Tribe: Myodochini
- Genus: Pachybrachius
- Species: P. luridus

Binomial name
- Pachybrachius luridus Hahn, 1826

Species of true bug

Pachybrachius luridus is a species of dirt-colored seed bug in the family Rhyparochromidae. It is found in Europe and Northern Asia (excluding China), North America, and Southern Asia.
