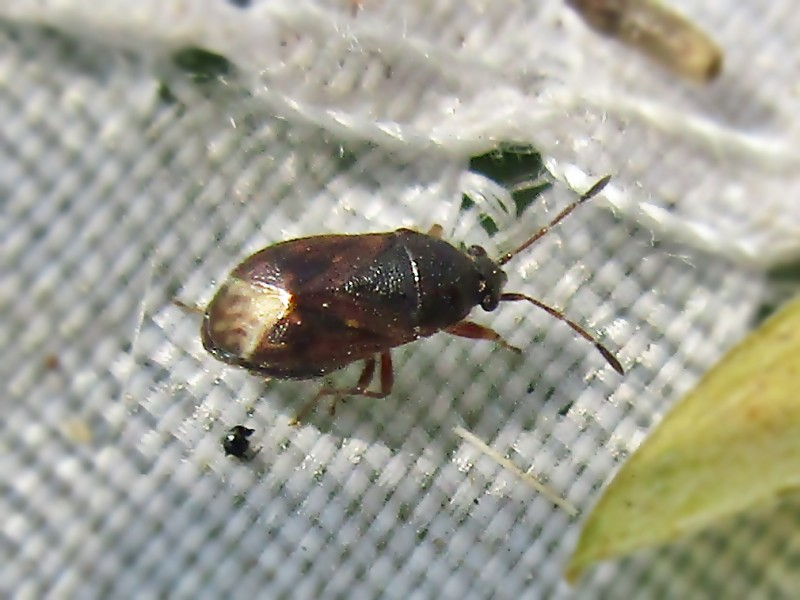
- Stygnocoris sabulosus

Scientific classification
- Kingdom: Animalia
- Phylum: Arthropoda
- Class: Insecta
- Order: Hemiptera
- Suborder: Heteroptera
- Family: Rhyparochromidae
- Subfamily: Rhyparochrominae
- Tribe: Stygnocorini
- Genus: Stygnocoris; Douglas & Scott, 1865

= Stygnocoris =

Genus of true bugs

Stygnocoris is a genus of dirt-colored seed bugs in the family Rhyparochromidae. There are about 15 described species in Stygnocoris.

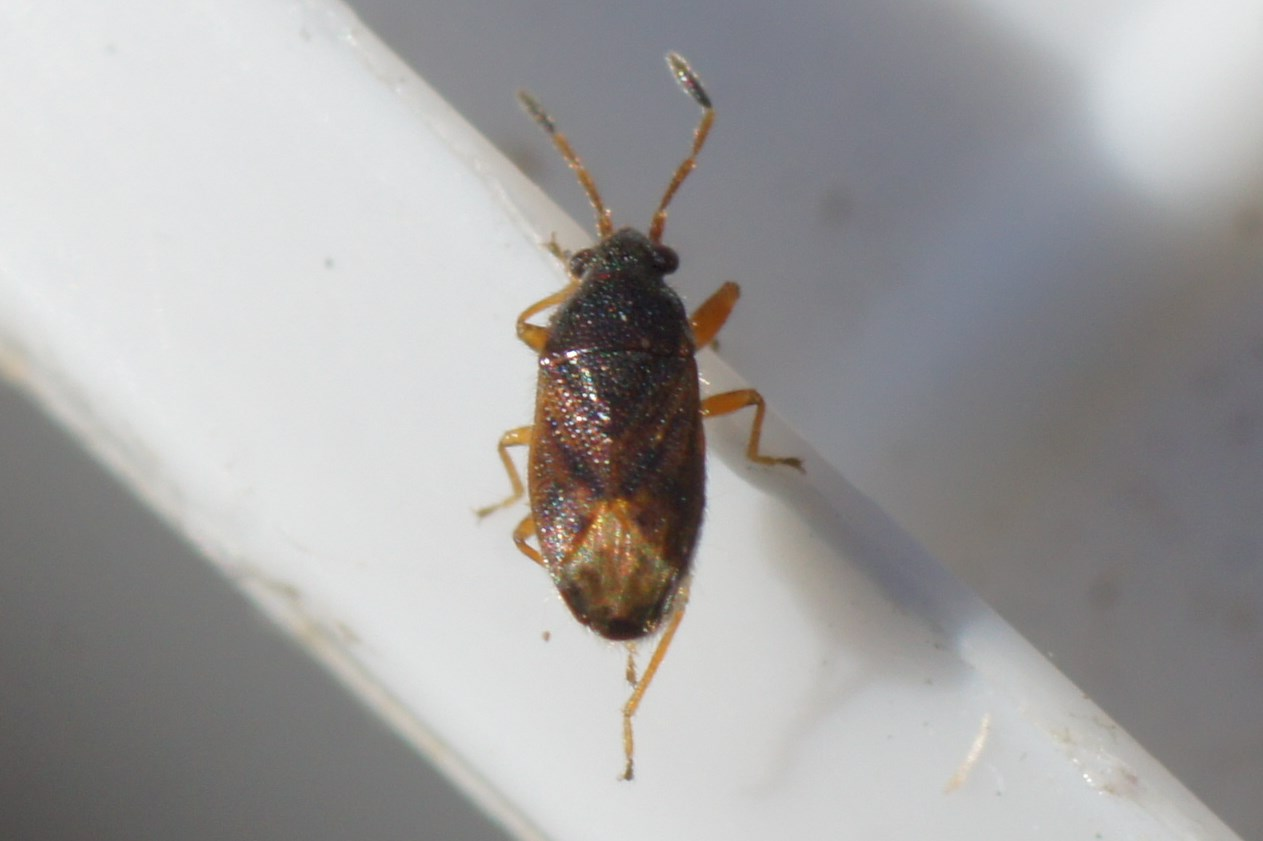
Stygnocoris sabulosus

== Species ==
These 15 species belong to the genus Stygnocoris:

- Stygnocoris barbieri Pericart, 1993
- Stygnocoris breviceps Wagner, 1953
- Stygnocoris faustus Horvath, 1888
- Stygnocoris fuligineus Geoffroy, 1785
- Stygnocoris mandibularis Montandon, 1889
- Stygnocoris matocqui Pericart, 1993
- Stygnocoris mayeti (Puton, 1879)
- Stygnocoris prionoides (Kolenati, 1845)
- Stygnocoris pygmaeus (Sahlberg, 1848)
- Stygnocoris rusticus (Fallen, 1807)
- Stygnocoris sabulosus (Schilling, 1829)
- Stygnocoris similis Wagner, 1953
- Stygnocoris subglaber (Puton, 1889)
- Stygnocoris truncatus (Horvath In Saunders, 1893)
- Stygnocoris uyttenboogaarti Blote, 1929
