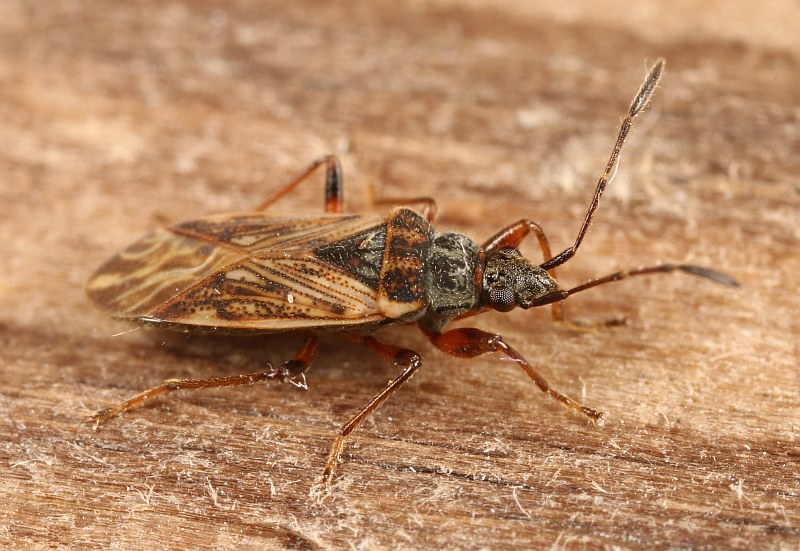
- Pachybrachius fracticollis

Scientific classification
- Kingdom: Animalia
- Phylum: Arthropoda
- Class: Insecta
- Order: Hemiptera
- Suborder: Heteroptera
- Family: Rhyparochromidae
- Subfamily: Rhyparochrominae
- Tribe: Myodochini
- Genus: Pachybrachius; Hahn, 1826

= Pachybrachius =

Genus of true bugs

Pachybrachius is a genus of dirt-colored seed bugs in the family Rhyparochromidae. There are about 11 described species in Pachybrachius.

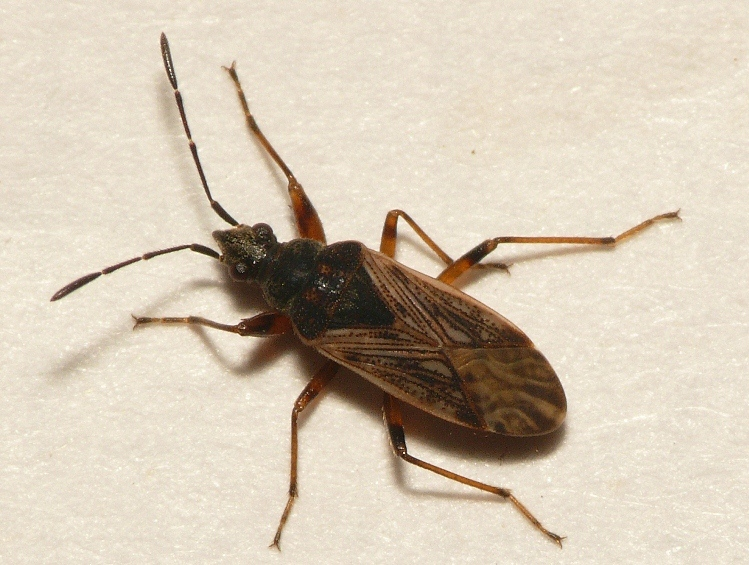
Pachybrachius fracticollis

== Species ==
These 11 species belong to the genus Pachybrachius:

- Pachybrachius biguttatus Curtis, 1831
- Pachybrachius capitatus (Horvath, 1882)
- Pachybrachius circumcinctus (Walker, 1872)
- Pachybrachius fasciatus (Fieber, 1861)
- Pachybrachius festivus (Distant, 1883)
- Pachybrachius fracticollis (Schilling, 1829)
- Pachybrachius luridus Hahn, 1826
- Pachybrachius oculatus (Van Duzee, 1940)
- Pachybrachius pictus (Scott, 1880)
- Pachybrachius pusillus (Dallas, 1852)
- Pachybrachius vaccaroi Mancini, 1954
