= Lütau =

- Municipality
- Coat of arms

- Location of Lütau within Herzogtum Lauenburg district
- Interactive map of Lütau
- Location within Germany Location within Schleswig-Holstein
- Coordinates: 53°26′9″N 10°33′3″E
- Country: Germany
- State: Schleswig-Holstein
- District: Herzogtum Lauenburg
- Municipal assoc.: Lütau

Government
  - Mayor: Jürgen Awe

Area
  - Total: 11.24 km^{2} (4.34 sq mi)
- Elevation: 31 m (102 ft)

Population (2025-12-31)
  - Total: 669
  - Density: 59.5/km^{2} (154/sq mi)
- Time zone: UTC+01:00 (CET)
  - Summer (DST): UTC+02:00 (CEST)
- Postal codes: 21483
- Dialling codes: 04153
- Vehicle registration: RZ
- Website: www.lauenburg.de

Lütau is a village in the district of Lauenburg, in Schleswig-Holstein, Germany. It is situated approximately 7 km north of Lauenburg/Elbe, and 40 km east of Hamburg.

Lütau is part of the Amt ("collective municipality") Lütau. The seat of the Amt is in Lauenburg/Elbe.
