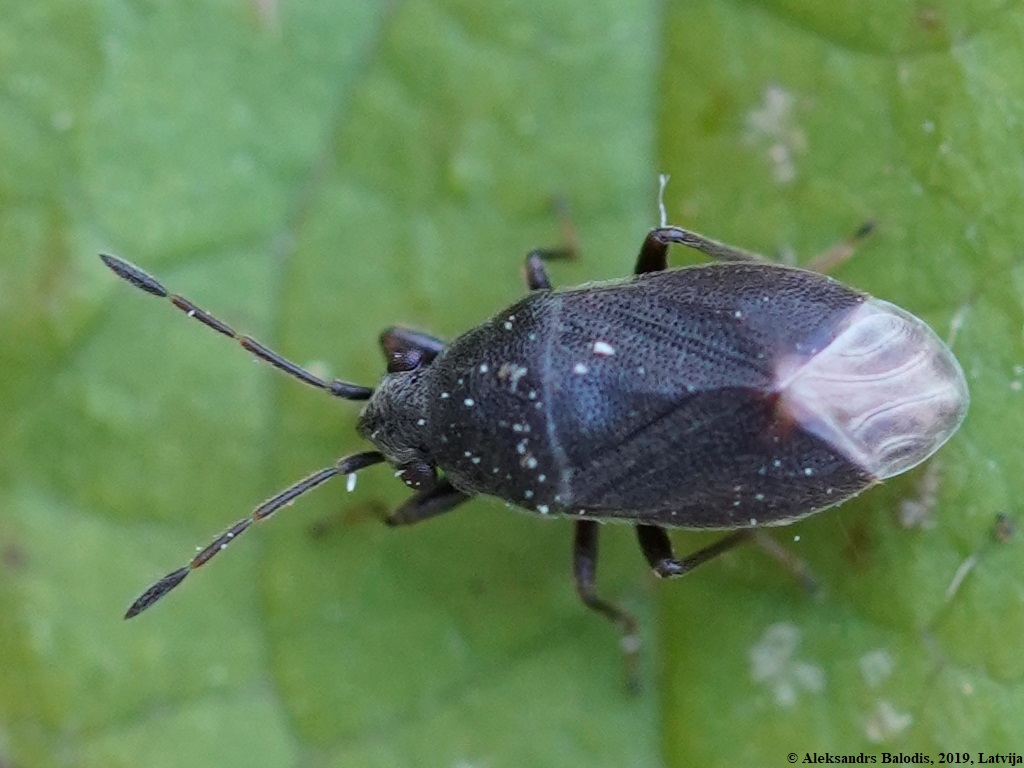

Scientific classification
- Domain: Eukaryota
- Kingdom: Animalia
- Phylum: Arthropoda
- Class: Insecta
- Order: Hemiptera
- Suborder: Heteroptera
- Family: Rhyparochromidae
- Genus: Stygnocoris
- Species: S. rusticus

Binomial name
- Stygnocoris rusticus (Fallén, 1807)

Synonyms
- Lygaeus rusticus Fallén, 1807

= Stygnocoris rusticus =

Species of true bug

Stygnocoris rusticus is a species of dirt-colored seed bug in the family Rhyparochromidae. It is found in Africa, Europe and Northern Asia (excluding China), and North America.

== Subspecies ==
These two subspecies belong to the species Stygnocoris rusticus:

- Stygnocoris rusticus agricolus (Westhoff, 1884)
- Stygnocoris rusticus rusticus (Fallen, 1807)
