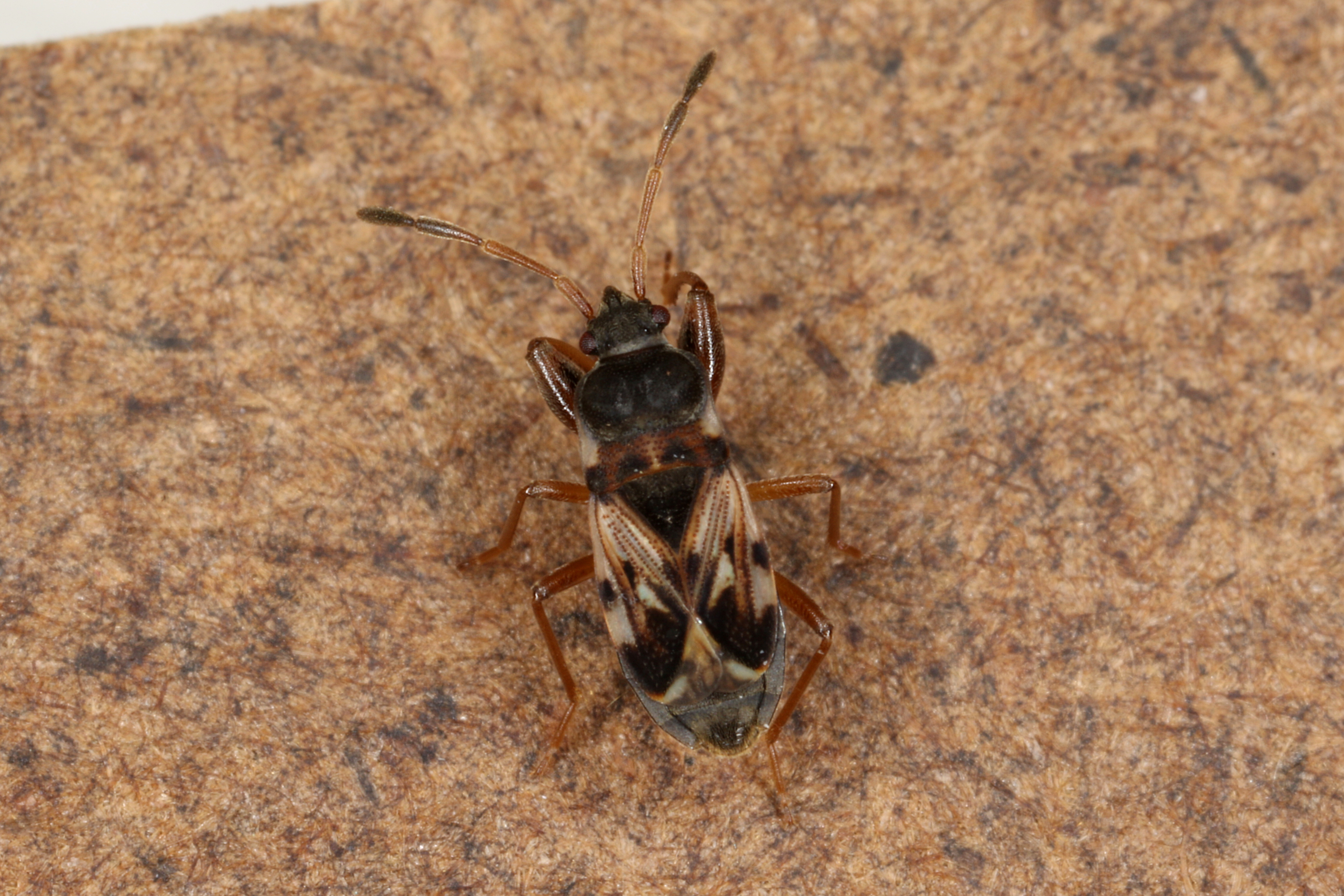
- Scolopostethus affinis, Denmark

Scientific classification
- Kingdom: Animalia
- Phylum: Arthropoda
- Clade: Pancrustacea
- Class: Insecta
- Order: Hemiptera
- Suborder: Heteroptera
- Family: Rhyparochromidae
- Subfamily: Rhyparochrominae
- Tribe: Drymini
- Genus: Scolopostethus
- Species: S. affinis

Binomial name
- Scolopostethus affinis (Schilling, 1829)

= Scolopostethus affinis =

Species of dirt-colored seed bug

Scolopostethus affinis is a species of dirt-colored seed bug in the family Rhyparochromidae, found mainly in the Palearctic.
