= Buchhorst =

- Municipality
- Coat of arms

- Location of Buchhorst within Herzogtum Lauenburg district
- Interactive map of Buchhorst
- Location within Germany Location within Schleswig-Holstein
- Coordinates: 53°23′N 10°34′E
- Country: Germany
- State: Schleswig-Holstein
- District: Herzogtum Lauenburg
- Municipal assoc.: Lütau

Government
  - Mayor: Torsten Tarinowski

Area
  - Total: 5.19 km^{2} (2.00 sq mi)
- Elevation: 8 m (26 ft)

Population (2025-12-31)
  - Total: 157
  - Density: 30.3/km^{2} (78.3/sq mi)
- Time zone: UTC+01:00 (CET)
  - Summer (DST): UTC+02:00 (CEST)
- Postal codes: 21481
- Dialling codes: 04153
- Vehicle registration: RZ
- Website: www.lauenburg.de

Buchhorst is a municipality in the district of Lauenburg, located in Schleswig-Holstein, Germany.
