= Krüzen, Schleswig-Holstein =

- Municipality
- Coat of arms

- Location of Krüzen, Schleswig-Holstein within Herzogtum Lauenburg district
- Interactive map of Krüzen, Schleswig-Holstein
- Location within Germany Location within Schleswig-Holstein
- Coordinates: 53°24′N 10°32′E
- Country: Germany
- State: Schleswig-Holstein
- District: Herzogtum Lauenburg
- Municipal assoc.: Lütau

Government
  - Mayor: Werner Schumacher

Area
  - Total: 8.24 km^{2} (3.18 sq mi)
- Elevation: 37 m (121 ft)

Population (2025-12-31)
  - Total: 336
  - Density: 40.8/km^{2} (106/sq mi)
- Time zone: UTC+01:00 (CET)
  - Summer (DST): UTC+02:00 (CEST)
- Postal codes: 21483
- Dialling codes: 04153
- Vehicle registration: RZ
- Website: www.lauenburg.de

Krüzen (German pronunciation: [ˈkʁyːtsn̩]) is a municipality in the district of Lauenburg, in Schleswig-Holstein, Germany.
