= John Basedow =

American fitness personality

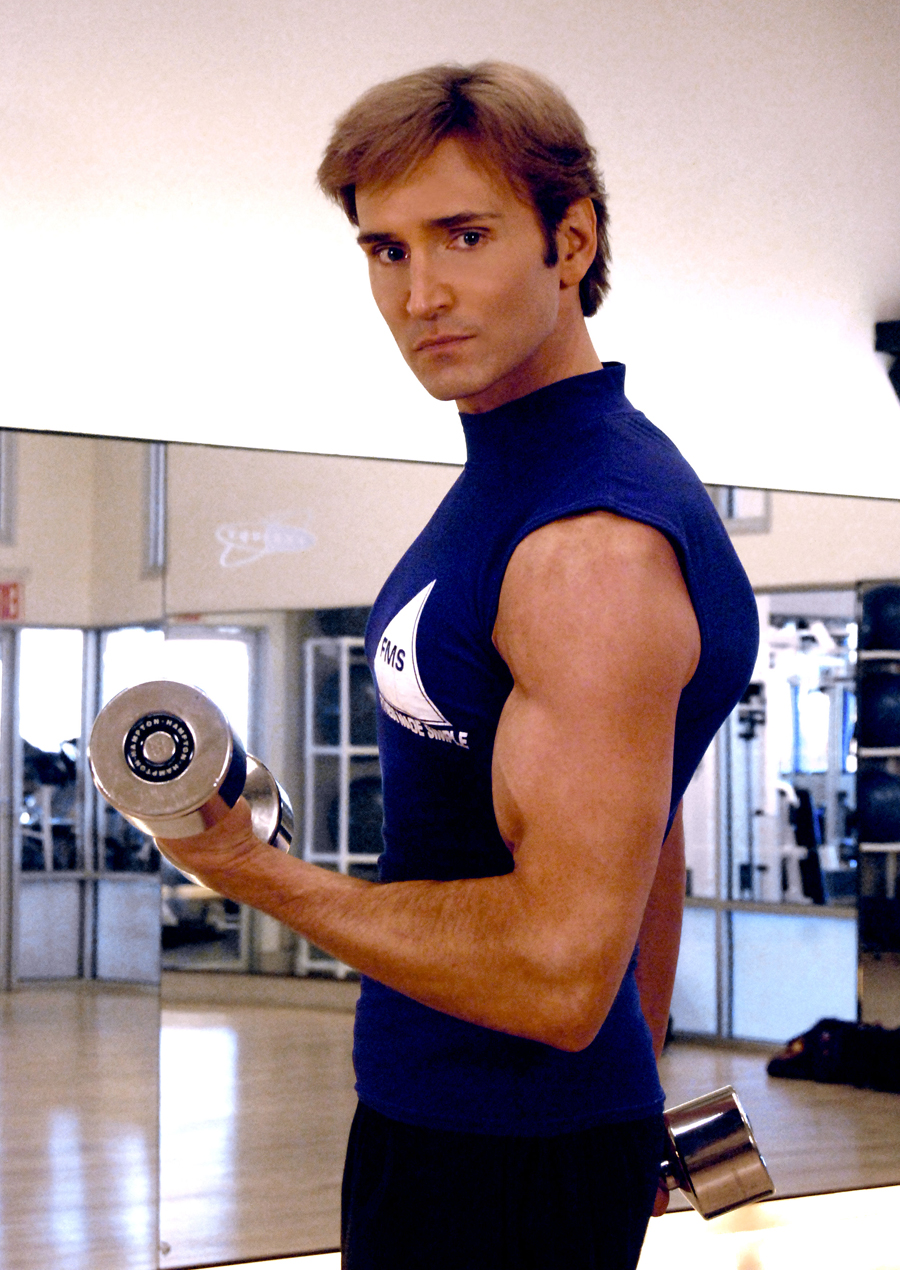
- Basedow in 2008
- Born: New York City, U.S.
- Occupations: Television personality; Author
- Height: 6 ft 3 in (191 cm)
- Website: johnbasedow.net

John Basedow is an American television personality, model, author, and motivational speaker. He produces the Fitness Made Simple video series and the Internet series New Media Stew.

== Career ==
=== Early work ===
Basedow started his career as a reporter on a New York nightly news program and then co-created a syndicated television show called Images.

After Images, Basedow, appeared in fitness magazines, founding "Fitness Made Simple". He subsequently commercialized the "Fitness Made Simple" routine and began selling a series of DRTV infomercials. He authored his first book, Fitness Made Simple: The Power to Change Your Body, the Power to Change Your Life. The commercial marketing success was in part due to Basedow's business strategy of opting for frequency over length, which was a novel approach for fitness infomercials at the time. Basedow made deals for discounted unsold commercial inventory enabling an unusually high frequency of the ads. Over time, the availability of unsold airtime decreased as networks decided to promote themselves and some Multiple System Operators (MSO) ceased to exist, in turn reducing the viability of Basedow's "Fitness Made Simple" commercials.

=== Social media influencer ===
In recent years, Basedow has become an active social media personality. In 2007, an outside production company launched an online reality show entitled "John Basedow TV" on YouTube. In 2011, he served as the host for the popular YouTube series, Lesbian Video Speed Dating. Following that, Basedow launched the YouTube series New Media Stew and Culture Pop, covering pop culture and celebrity news. He encourages the use of social media as a form of empowerment and motivation. His #WakeUpWords motivational Vine and Instagram videos, which promote positivity and self-empowerment, have been featured on Fox's Good Day New York and the Red Eye.

In 2017, Basedow was featured on an episode of Viceland's The Untitled Action Bronson Show. In 2018, Basedow was a guest on the Tom Shillue show, and a keynote speaker at the "I Am Success Summit" in Syracuse, where he also appeared on a panel with MTV's Justina Valentine and Starz Power cast member Rotimi. In 2018, he was a guest on Viceland's Fuck, That's Delicious. In 2021, he was featured in the New York Post.

In 2019, Basedow started JB's Fantastic Finds, a live online auction hosted on Facebook. The show grew in popularity following the deployment of television commercials in an innovative approach advertising new media on traditional media.

John Basedow and his schipperke, Storm, have been highlighted for their achievements in canine sports and performance events.

== Film ==
Year	Title	Role
2018	Somnium	Priest
2017	Me Familia	Robert Trendall
2013	Six Minutes Of Death	Dr. Felps
2012	Acedia	Erick

== Published works ==
- Basedow, John (2008). Fitness Made Simple : The Power to Change Your Body, the Power to Change Your Life. New York: McGraw-Hill. ISBN 978-0071497084.
