= Juliusburg =

- Municipality
- Location of Juliusburg within Herzogtum Lauenburg district
- Interactive map of Juliusburg
- Location within Germany Location within Schleswig-Holstein
- Coordinates: 53°25′N 10°30′E
- Country: Germany
- State: Schleswig-Holstein
- District: Herzogtum Lauenburg
- Municipal assoc.: Lütau

Government
  - Mayor: Eckhard Porth

Area
  - Total: 6.04 km^{2} (2.33 sq mi)
- Elevation: 31 m (102 ft)

Population (2025-12-31)
  - Total: 193
  - Density: 32.0/km^{2} (82.8/sq mi)
- Time zone: UTC+01:00 (CET)
  - Summer (DST): UTC+02:00 (CEST)
- Postal codes: 21483
- Dialling codes: 04153
- Vehicle registration: RZ
- Website: www.lauenburg.de

Juliusburg is a municipality in the district of Lauenburg, in Schleswig-Holstein, Germany. The population was 170 people in 2020.
