= Wangelau =

- Municipality
- Coat of arms

- Location of Wangelau within Herzogtum Lauenburg district
- Interactive map of Wangelau
- Location within Germany Location within Schleswig-Holstein
- Coordinates: 53°27′N 10°33′E
- Country: Germany
- State: Schleswig-Holstein
- District: Herzogtum Lauenburg
- Municipal assoc.: Lütau

Government
  - Mayor: Marina Schmidt

Area
  - Total: 6.52 km^{2} (2.52 sq mi)
- Elevation: 36 m (118 ft)

Population (2025-12-31)
  - Total: 223
  - Density: 34.2/km^{2} (88.6/sq mi)
- Time zone: UTC+01:00 (CET)
  - Summer (DST): UTC+02:00 (CEST)
- Postal codes: 21483
- Dialling codes: 04155
- Vehicle registration: RZ

Wangelau is a municipality in the district of Lauenburg, in Schleswig-Holstein, Germany.
