= Angela Lanza =

American singer

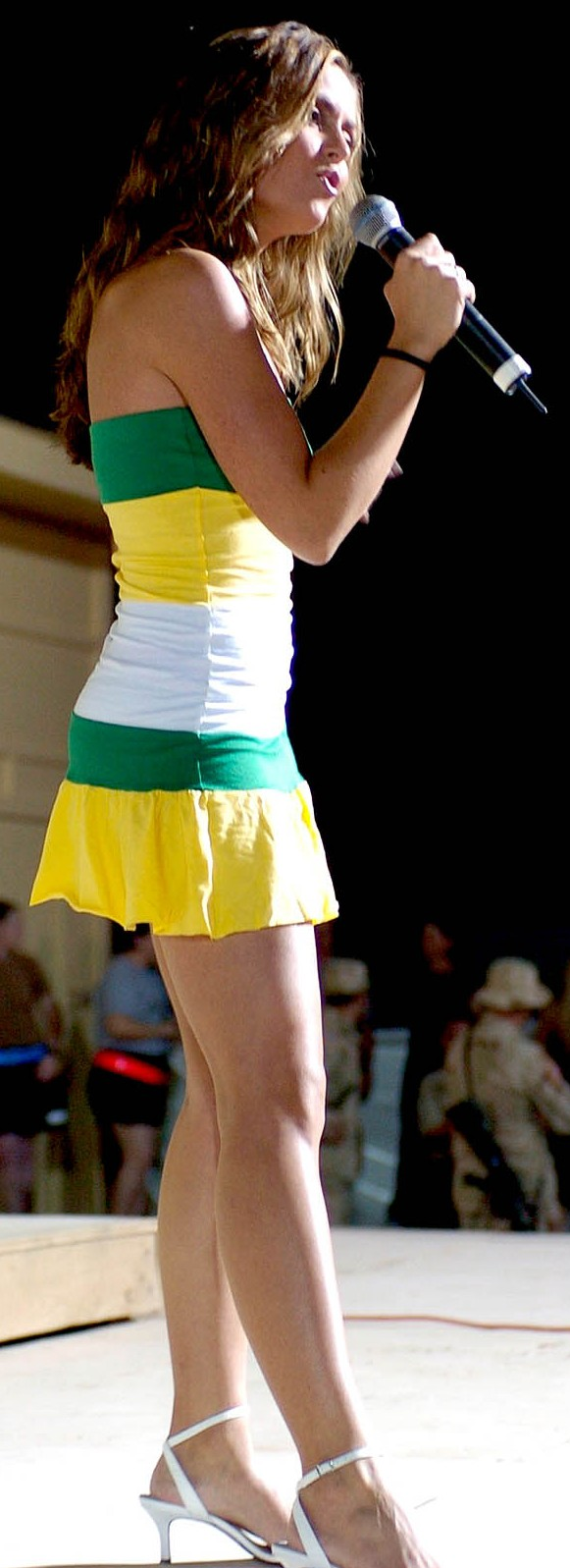
Angela Lanza performing for US soldiers at NATO's military base in Kandahar, Afghanistan - 2004.

Angela Lanza is an American singer from Bay City, Michigan, who has performed in different American cities and internationally as well.

She joined with other performers, sponsored by Hooters in their Let Freedom Wing Tour, to perform for US forces overseas. As part of this special USO tour she performed in Afghanistan, Iraq, Kazakhstan, Pakistan, Qatar and Uzbekistan. Also in the overseas tour was pop group UC3, which included Tracy Williams.

Previously, Lanza tried out for season three of the American Idol television series, but was not accepted.

== Education ==
After going to Bay City Central High School, she attended Michigan State University. After touring, the Communications major graduated from Michigan State, and was selected to perform at commencement ceremonies in 2006.
