= Lanze =

- Municipality
- Location of Lanze within Herzogtum Lauenburg district
- Interactive map of Lanze
- Location within Germany Location within Schleswig-Holstein
- Coordinates: 53°23′N 10°36′E
- Country: Germany
- State: Schleswig-Holstein
- District: Herzogtum Lauenburg
- Municipal assoc.: Lütau

Government
  - Mayor: Rolf Meyer-Bothling

Area
  - Total: 9.04 km^{2} (3.49 sq mi)
- Elevation: 8 m (26 ft)

Population (2025-12-31)
  - Total: 269
  - Density: 29.8/km^{2} (77.1/sq mi)
- Time zone: UTC+01:00 (CET)
  - Summer (DST): UTC+02:00 (CEST)
- Postal codes: 21483
- Dialling codes: 04153
- Vehicle registration: RZ
- Website: www.lanze.de

Lanze (German pronunciation: [ˈlantsə]) is a municipality in the district of Lauenburg, in Schleswig-Holstein, Germany.
