= Basedow, Schleswig-Holstein =

Basedow
- Municipality
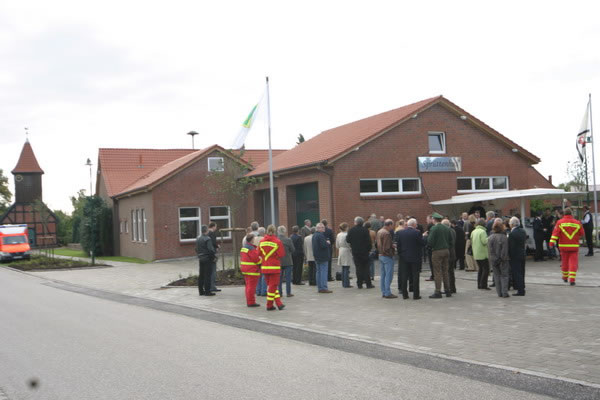
- Community centre

- Coat of arms

- Location of Basedow within Herzogtum Lauenburg district
- Interactive map of Basedow
- Location within Germany Location within Schleswig-Holstein
- Coordinates: 53°25′N 10°35′E
- Country: Germany
- State: Schleswig-Holstein
- District: Herzogtum Lauenburg
- Municipal assoc.: Lütau

Government
  - Mayor: Horst Ehing

Area
  - Total: 7.47 km^{2} (2.88 sq mi)
- Elevation: 31 m (102 ft)

Population (2025-12-31)
  - Total: 602
  - Density: 80.6/km^{2} (209/sq mi)
- Time zone: UTC+01:00 (CET)
  - Summer (DST): UTC+02:00 (CEST)
- Postal codes: 21483
- Dialling codes: 04153
- Vehicle registration: RZ
- Website: www.basedow-sh.de

Basedow (German pronunciation: [ˈbaːzədoː]) is a municipality in the district of Lauenburg, in Schleswig-Holstein, Germany.
