= Samuel Peter Schilling =

German entomologist (1773–1852)

- Born: 10 April 1773; Juliusburg, Germany
- Died: 15 December 1852 (aged 79); Breslau, Poland
- Known for: Entomology
- Scientific career
- Fields: Entomology

Samuel Peter Schilling (10 April 1773 - 15 December 1852) was a German entomologist.

== Biography ==
After attending school in Hirschberg he studied Theology in Halle until 1795, followed by Philology. Between 1795 and 1797 he was a teacher at the Pensions-Anstalt of Wrocław. In 1798 he taught natural history at the Mary Magdalene School in Breslau before retiring in 1843.

During his time as a teacher, he published magazines and books for the general education of children and young people.

In his free time, Schilling studied the insect fauna of his homeland. He was a member of the Association of entomology in the Silesian Society (Schlesischen Gesellschaft für vaterländische Kultur) where he published a number of his scientific contributions.

== Works (selection) ==
- Schilling, P. S., 1821: Ausführliche Beschreibung und Abbildung der zu Wien und Breslau im Monat August 1821 angeblich aus der Luft gefallenen Insekten.
- Schilling, P. S., 1830: Lustreise in die Grafschaft Glatz.
- Schilling, P. S., 1836–1841: Ausführliche Naturgeschichte des Thier-, Pflanzen- und Mineralreichs in 5 Bdn.
- Schilling P.S. 1838. Bemerkungen über die in Schlesien und Grafschaft Glatz vorgefundenen Arten der Ameisen. übers. Arb. Schles. Ges. Vaterl. Kult. (1838): 51–56;
- Schilling, P. S. 1843. Ueber die in Schlesien und der Grafschaft Glatz bisher aufgefundenen Arten der Schildwanzen. Übers Arb. Ver. Schles. Ges. Vaterl. Kult. 1842:159–160. [Lis, 1989]
- Schilling, P. S. 1844. Ueber die in Schlesien und der Grafschaft Glatz von mir gesammelten Arten der Gattung Pentatoma Latreille. Übers. Arb. Ver. Schles. Ges. Vaterl. Kult. 1843:179–184. [Lis, 1989]
- Schilling S. 1845. Systematische Übersicht der in Schlesien und der Grafschaft Glatz gesammelten Rüsselkäfer mit gebrochenen Fühlern. Uebers. Arb. Veränd.Schles. Ges. Vaterld. Kult. (1844): 73–75.
- Schilling S. 1849. Die einsam lebenden Bienen Schlesiens. Uebers. Arb. Verand. Schles. Ges. Vaterd. Kult. (1848): 99–104.
- Schilling S. 1903–1906. Samuel Schillings Kleine Schul-Naturgeschichte der drei Reiche (Vol. 1–3) Hirt, Breslau Digital edition by the University and State Library Düsseldorf
