= Desmia flavalis =

Scientific classification
- Domain: Eukaryota
- Kingdom: Animalia
- Phylum: Arthropoda
- Class: Insecta
- Order: Lepidoptera
- Family: Crambidae
- Genus: Desmia
- Species: D. flavalis

Binomial name
- Desmia flavalis Schaus, 1912

Species of moth

Desmia flavalis is a moth in the family Crambidae. It was described by Schaus in 1912. It is found in Costa Rica.
