= Desmia sepulchralis =

Scientific classification
- Kingdom: Animalia
- Phylum: Arthropoda
- Class: Insecta
- Order: Lepidoptera
- Family: Crambidae
- Genus: Desmia
- Species: D. sepulchralis

Binomial name
- Desmia sepulchralis Guenée, 1854

Species of moth

Desmia sepulchralis is a moth in the family Crambidae. It is found in French Guiana.
