= Conotalis nigroradians =

Scientific classification
- Domain: Eukaryota
- Kingdom: Animalia
- Phylum: Arthropoda
- Class: Insecta
- Order: Lepidoptera
- Family: Crambidae
- Subfamily: incertae sedis
- Genus: Conotalis
- Species: C. nigroradians

Binomial name
- Conotalis nigroradians (Mabille, 1900)

Synonyms
- Crambus nigroradians Mabille, 1900

Species of moth

Conotalis nigroradians is a moth in the family Crambidae. It was described by Paul Mabille in 1900. It is found on the Comoros and in the Democratic Republic of the Congo, Malawi and Tanzania.
