= Desmia phaiorrhoea =

Scientific classification
- Kingdom: Animalia
- Phylum: Arthropoda
- Class: Insecta
- Order: Lepidoptera
- Family: Crambidae
- Genus: Desmia
- Species: D. phaiorrhoea

Binomial name
- Desmia phaiorrhoea Dyar, 1914

Species of moth

Desmia phaiorrhoea is a moth in the family Crambidae described by Harrison Gray Dyar Jr. in 1914. It is found in Panama.

The wingspan is about 25 mm. The forewings are black with two oval white spots. The hindwings have an inner spot below the cell, nearly to the inner margin and duplicated on the outside by a narrow white line.
