= Desmia semivacualis =

Scientific classification
- Domain: Eukaryota
- Kingdom: Animalia
- Phylum: Arthropoda
- Class: Insecta
- Order: Lepidoptera
- Family: Crambidae
- Genus: Desmia
- Species: D. semivacualis

Binomial name
- Desmia semivacualis Dognin, 1903

Species of moth

Desmia semivacualis is a moth in the family Crambidae. It is found in Ecuador.
