= Erupa ruptilineella =

Scientific classification
- Kingdom: Animalia
- Phylum: Arthropoda
- Clade: Pancrustacea
- Class: Insecta
- Order: Lepidoptera
- Family: Crambidae
- Genus: Erupa
- Species: E. ruptilineella

Binomial name
- Erupa ruptilineella Hampson, 1896

Species of moth

Erupa ruptilineella is a moth in the family Crambidae. It was described by George Hampson in 1896. It is found in Xalapa, Mexico.
