= Desmia herrichialis =

Scientific classification
- Domain: Eukaryota
- Kingdom: Animalia
- Phylum: Arthropoda
- Class: Insecta
- Order: Lepidoptera
- Family: Crambidae
- Genus: Desmia
- Species: D. herrichialis

Binomial name
- Desmia herrichialis Hering, 1906

Species of moth

Desmia herrichialis is a moth in the family Crambidae. It is found in Colombia.
