= Desmia filicornis =

Scientific classification
- Domain: Eukaryota
- Kingdom: Animalia
- Phylum: Arthropoda
- Class: Insecta
- Order: Lepidoptera
- Family: Crambidae
- Genus: Desmia
- Species: D. filicornis

Binomial name
- Desmia filicornis Munroe, 1959

Species of moth

Desmia filicornis is a moth in the family Crambidae. It was described by Eugene G. Munroe in 1959. It is found in Panama.
