= Erupa =

Scientific classification
- Kingdom: Animalia
- Phylum: Arthropoda
- Clade: Pancrustacea
- Class: Insecta
- Order: Lepidoptera
- Family: Crambidae
- Subfamily: Erupinae
- Genus: Erupa; Walker, 1864

Synonyms
- Gabalaeca Walker, 1866; Gabalanca Bleszynski & Collins, 1962; Zolca Walker, 1866; Neerupa Hampson, 1919

Genus of moths

Erupa is a genus of moths of the family Crambidae.

== Species ==
- Erupa adiposalis (Dognin, 1912)
- Erupa argentescens Hampson, 1896
- Erupa argentilinea Druce, 1910
- Erupa argyrosticta (Hampson, 1919)
- Erupa bilineatella (Walker, 1866)
- Erupa chiloides Walker, 1864
- Erupa chilopsisina Schaus, 1922
- Erupa cluaca Druce, 1900
- Erupa congruella (Walker, 1866)
- Erupa digrammica Hampson, 1919
- Erupa discordella Schaus, 1913
- Erupa eambardella (Schaus, 1922)
- Erupa gigantea Druce, 1900
- Erupa gyges Druce, 1900
- Erupa herstanellus (Schaus, 1922)
- Erupa huarmellus Schaus, 1922
- Erupa impunctella Schaus, 1922
- Erupa invidella Schaus, 1913
- Erupa lactealis Hampson, 1896
- Erupa luceria Druce, 1902
- Erupa nampa Schaus, 1929
- Erupa nigrescentella Hampson, 1896
- Erupa olorana Schaus, 1934
- Erupa patara Druce, 1902
- Erupa plumbealis Hampson, 1919
- Erupa pravella Schaus, 1913
- Erupa prodigialis (Zeller, 1877)
- Erupa puncticilialis Hampson, 1919
- Erupa rhaetia Druce, 1900
- Erupa ruptilineella Hampson, 1896
- Erupa schoenobina Hampson, 1919
- Erupa similis Druce, 1899
- Erupa somenella Schaus, 1922
- Erupa teinopalpia (Hampson, 1913)
- Erupa titana Druce, 1910
- Erupa titanalis C. Felder, R. Felder & Rogenhofer, 1875
