= Lancia phrontisalis =

Scientific classification
- Domain: Eukaryota
- Kingdom: Animalia
- Phylum: Arthropoda
- Class: Insecta
- Order: Lepidoptera
- Family: Crambidae
- Subfamily: Erupinae
- Genus: Lancia; Walker, 1859
- Species: L. phrontisalis

Binomial name
- Lancia phrontisalis Walker, 1859

Species of moth

Lancia is a genus of moths of the family Crambidae. It contains only one species, Lancia phrontisalis, which is found in Brazil (Rio de Janeiro).
