= Desmia mortualis =

Scientific classification
- Kingdom: Animalia
- Phylum: Arthropoda
- Class: Insecta
- Order: Lepidoptera
- Family: Crambidae
- Genus: Desmia
- Species: D. mortualis

Binomial name
- Desmia mortualis Hampson, 1912

Species of moth

Desmia mortualis is a moth in the family Crambidae. It was described by George Hampson in 1912. It is found in Guatemala.
