= Desmia ctenuchalis =

Scientific classification
- Domain: Eukaryota
- Kingdom: Animalia
- Phylum: Arthropoda
- Class: Insecta
- Order: Lepidoptera
- Family: Crambidae
- Genus: Desmia
- Species: D. ctenuchalis

Binomial name
- Desmia ctenuchalis (Dognin, 1907)

Synonyms
- Phyganodes ctenuchalis Dognin, 1907

Species of moth

Desmia ctenuchalis is a moth in the family Crambidae. It was described by Paul Dognin in 1907. It is found in Peru.
