= Desmia pantalis =

Scientific classification
- Kingdom: Animalia
- Phylum: Arthropoda
- Class: Insecta
- Order: Lepidoptera
- Family: Crambidae
- Genus: Desmia
- Species: D. pantalis

Binomial name
- Desmia pantalis Dyar, 1927

Species of moth

Desmia pantalis is a moth in the family Crambidae. It is found in Mexico (Colima).
