= Linosta annulifera =

Scientific classification
- Domain: Eukaryota
- Kingdom: Animalia
- Phylum: Arthropoda
- Class: Insecta
- Order: Lepidoptera
- Family: Crambidae
- Genus: Linosta
- Species: L. annulifera

Binomial name
- Linosta annulifera Munroe, 1959

Species of moth

Linosta annulifera is a moth in the family Crambidae. It was described by Eugene G. Munroe in 1959. It is found in Peru and Bolivia.
