= Desmia clarkei =

Scientific classification
- Domain: Eukaryota
- Kingdom: Animalia
- Phylum: Arthropoda
- Class: Insecta
- Order: Lepidoptera
- Family: Crambidae
- Genus: Desmia
- Species: D. clarkei

Binomial name
- Desmia clarkei Amsel, 1956

Species of moth

Desmia clarkei is a moth in the family Crambidae. It is found in Venezuela and Costa Rica.
