= Erupa patara =

Scientific classification
- Kingdom: Animalia
- Phylum: Arthropoda
- Clade: Pancrustacea
- Class: Insecta
- Order: Lepidoptera
- Family: Crambidae
- Genus: Erupa
- Species: E. patara

Binomial name
- Erupa patara H. Druce, 1902

Species of moth

Erupa patara is a moth in the family Crambidae. It was described by Herbert Druce in 1902. It is found in Ecuador.
