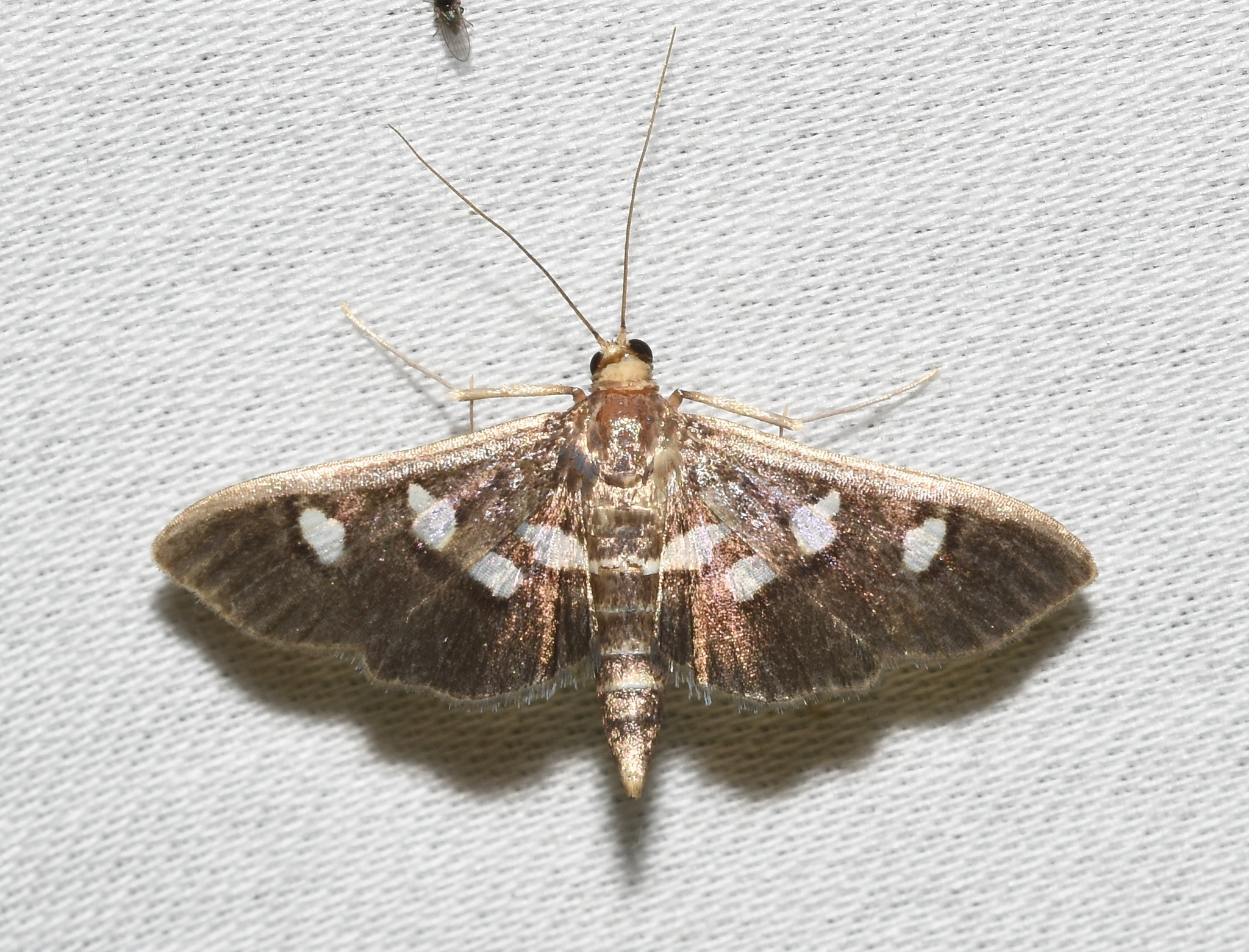

Scientific classification
- Kingdom: Animalia
- Phylum: Arthropoda
- Class: Insecta
- Order: Lepidoptera
- Family: Crambidae
- Genus: Desmia
- Species: D. subdivisalis

Binomial name
- Desmia subdivisalis Grote, 1871

Synonyms
- Desmia nominabilis E. Hering, 1906

= Desmia subdivisalis =

Species of moth

Desmia subdivisalis is a species of moth in the family Crambidae. It was described by Augustus Radcliffe Grote in 1871. It is found in the West Indies, Mexico and the United States, where it has been recorded from Florida to New Mexico, Illinois, Maryland and California.

The wingspan is about 19 mm. Adults are on wing from April to August.
