= Erupa digrammica =

Scientific classification
- Kingdom: Animalia
- Phylum: Arthropoda
- Clade: Pancrustacea
- Class: Insecta
- Order: Lepidoptera
- Family: Crambidae
- Genus: Erupa
- Species: E. digrammica

Binomial name
- Erupa digrammica Hampson, 1919

Species of moth

Erupa digrammica is a moth in the family Crambidae. It was described by George Hampson in 1919. It is found in Peru.
