= Desmia bigeminalis =

Scientific classification
- Domain: Eukaryota
- Kingdom: Animalia
- Phylum: Arthropoda
- Class: Insecta
- Order: Lepidoptera
- Family: Crambidae
- Genus: Desmia
- Species: D. bigeminalis

Binomial name
- Desmia bigeminalis (Dognin, 1905)

Synonyms
- Aediodes bigeminalis Dognin, 1905

Species of moth

Desmia bigeminalis is a moth in the family Crambidae. It was described by Paul Dognin in 1905. It is found in Bolivia.
