= Desmia geminalis =

Scientific classification
- Kingdom: Animalia
- Phylum: Arthropoda
- Class: Insecta
- Order: Lepidoptera
- Family: Crambidae
- Genus: Desmia
- Species: D. geminalis

Binomial name
- Desmia geminalis Snellen, 1875

Species of moth

Desmia geminalis is a moth in the family Crambidae. It was described by Snellen in 1875. It is found in Colombia.
