= Desmia octomaculalis =

Scientific classification
- Domain: Eukaryota
- Kingdom: Animalia
- Phylum: Arthropoda
- Class: Insecta
- Order: Lepidoptera
- Family: Crambidae
- Genus: Desmia
- Species: D. octomaculalis

Binomial name
- Desmia octomaculalis Amsel, 1956

Species of moth

Desmia octomaculalis is a moth in the family Crambidae described by Hans Georg Amsel in 1956. It is found in Venezuela.
