= Desmia perfecta =

Scientific classification
- Domain: Eukaryota
- Kingdom: Animalia
- Phylum: Arthropoda
- Class: Insecta
- Order: Lepidoptera
- Family: Crambidae
- Genus: Desmia
- Species: D. perfecta

Binomial name
- Desmia perfecta Butler, 1882

Species of moth

Desmia perfecta is a moth in the family Crambidae. It was described by Arthur Gardiner Butler in 1882. It is found in Papua New Guinea.
