= Erupa pravella =

Scientific classification
- Kingdom: Animalia
- Phylum: Arthropoda
- Clade: Pancrustacea
- Class: Insecta
- Order: Lepidoptera
- Family: Crambidae
- Genus: Erupa
- Species: E. pravella

Binomial name
- Erupa pravella Schaus, 1913

Species of moth

Erupa pravella is a moth in the family Crambidae. It was described by William Schaus in 1913. It is found in Costa Rica.
