= Desmia ploralis =

Mournful desmia moth

Scientific classification
- Kingdom: Animalia
- Phylum: Arthropoda
- Class: Insecta
- Order: Lepidoptera
- Family: Crambidae
- Genus: Desmia
- Species: D. ploralis

Binomial name
- Desmia ploralis (Guenée, 1854)

Synonyms
- Aediodes ploralis Guenée, 1854; Desmia propinqualis Möschler, 1882; Desmia repandalis Schaus, 1920

Species of moth

Desmia ploralis, the mournful desmia moth, is a moth in the family Crambidae. It was described by Achille Guenée in 1854. It is found in French Guiana, Suriname, Brazil, Guatemala, Costa Rica, Mexico, the Caribbean and Florida.
