= Erupa chiloides =

Scientific classification
- Kingdom: Animalia
- Phylum: Arthropoda
- Clade: Pancrustacea
- Class: Insecta
- Order: Lepidoptera
- Family: Crambidae
- Genus: Erupa
- Species: E. chiloides

Binomial name
- Erupa chiloides Walker, 1864

Species of moth

Erupa chiloides is a moth in the family Crambidae. It was described by Francis Walker in 1864. It is found in Brazil.
