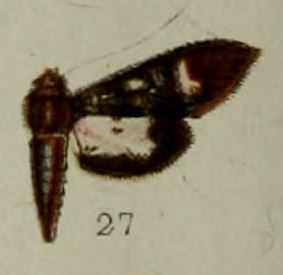

Scientific classification
- Kingdom: Animalia
- Phylum: Arthropoda
- Class: Insecta
- Order: Lepidoptera
- Family: Crambidae
- Genus: Desmia
- Species: D. melaleucalis

Binomial name
- Desmia melaleucalis Hampson, 1899

= Desmia melaleucalis =

Species of moth

Desmia melaleucalis is a moth in the family Crambidae. It was described by George Hampson in 1899. It is found in Ecuador.

The wingspan is about 30 mm. The forewings are purplish black with a short hyaline (glass-like) streak below the base of the cell and a triangular spot in the end of the cell, as well as a slight discoidal lunule. The hindwings are hyaline white, with a purplish-black base, costa and terminal area.
