= Desmia pisusalis =

Scientific classification
- Kingdom: Animalia
- Phylum: Arthropoda
- Class: Insecta
- Order: Lepidoptera
- Family: Crambidae
- Genus: Desmia
- Species: D. pisusalis

Binomial name
- Desmia pisusalis Walker, 1859

Species of moth

Desmia pisusalis is a moth in the family Crambidae. It is found in Brazil (Rio de Janeiro).
