= Erupa prodigialis =

Scientific classification
- Kingdom: Animalia
- Phylum: Arthropoda
- Clade: Pancrustacea
- Class: Insecta
- Order: Lepidoptera
- Family: Crambidae
- Genus: Erupa
- Species: E. prodigialis

Binomial name
- Erupa prodigialis (Zeller, 1877)

Synonyms
- Chilo prodigialis Zeller, 1877; Chilo prodigealis Hampson, 1896

Species of moth

Erupa prodigialis is a moth in the family Crambidae. It was described by Zeller in 1877. It is found in Brazil.
