= Desmia bifidalis =

Scientific classification
- Kingdom: Animalia
- Phylum: Arthropoda
- Class: Insecta
- Order: Lepidoptera
- Family: Crambidae
- Genus: Desmia
- Species: D. bifidalis

Binomial name
- Desmia bifidalis Hampson, 1912

Species of moth

Desmia bifidalis is a moth in the family Crambidae. It was described by George Hampson in 1912. It is found in Veracruz, Mexico.
