= Erupa titana =

Scientific classification
- Kingdom: Animalia
- Phylum: Arthropoda
- Clade: Pancrustacea
- Class: Insecta
- Order: Lepidoptera
- Family: Crambidae
- Genus: Erupa
- Species: E. titana

Binomial name
- Erupa titana H. Druce, 1910

Species of moth

Erupa titana is a moth in the family Crambidae. It was described by Herbert Druce in 1910. It is found in Peru.
