= Desmia paucimaculalis =

Scientific classification
- Kingdom: Animalia
- Phylum: Arthropoda
- Class: Insecta
- Order: Lepidoptera
- Family: Crambidae
- Genus: Desmia
- Species: D. paucimaculalis

Binomial name
- Desmia paucimaculalis Hampson, 1898

Synonyms
- Desmia sepulchralis Warren, 1889 (preocc. Guenée)

Species of moth

Desmia paucimaculalis is a moth in the family Crambidae described by George Hampson in 1898. It is found in Amazonas in Brazil and in Honduras.

The wingspan is about 24 mm. The wings are black, the forewings with a small subtriangular hyaline (glass-like) spot in the cell and an elongate wedge-shaped bar beyond the cell. There is an oblique antemedial hyaline band on the hindwings.
