= Desmia minnalis =

Scientific classification
- Domain: Eukaryota
- Kingdom: Animalia
- Phylum: Arthropoda
- Class: Insecta
- Order: Lepidoptera
- Family: Crambidae
- Genus: Desmia
- Species: D. minnalis

Binomial name
- Desmia minnalis Schaus, 1920

Synonyms
- Desmia minualis

Species of moth

Desmia minnalis is a moth in the family Crambidae. It was described by Schaus in 1920. It is found in Venezuela.
