= Linosta integrilinea =

Scientific classification
- Kingdom: Animalia
- Phylum: Arthropoda
- Class: Insecta
- Order: Lepidoptera
- Family: Crambidae
- Genus: Linosta
- Species: L. integrilinea

Binomial name
- Linosta integrilinea Munroe, 1962

Species of moth

Linosta integrilinea is a moth in the family Crambidae. It was described by Eugene G. Munroe in 1962. It is found in Peru.
