= Desmia tenuimaculata =

Scientific classification
- Domain: Eukaryota
- Kingdom: Animalia
- Phylum: Arthropoda
- Class: Insecta
- Order: Lepidoptera
- Family: Crambidae
- Genus: Desmia
- Species: D. tenuimaculata

Binomial name
- Desmia tenuimaculata Hering, 1906

Species of moth

Desmia tenuimaculata is a moth in the family Crambidae. It is found in Bolivia.
