= Erupa gyges =

Scientific classification
- Kingdom: Animalia
- Phylum: Arthropoda
- Clade: Pancrustacea
- Class: Insecta
- Order: Lepidoptera
- Family: Crambidae
- Genus: Erupa
- Species: E. gyges

Binomial name
- Erupa gyges H. Druce, 1900

Species of moth

Erupa gyges is a moth in the family Crambidae. It was described by Herbert Druce in 1900. It is found in Colombia.
