= Desmia funebralis =

Scientific classification
- Kingdom: Animalia
- Phylum: Arthropoda
- Class: Insecta
- Order: Lepidoptera
- Family: Crambidae
- Genus: Desmia
- Species: D. funebralis

Binomial name
- Desmia funebralis Guenée, 1854

Synonyms
- Desmia notalis C. Felder, R. Felder & Rogenhofer, 1875

Species of moth

Desmia funebralis is a moth in the family Crambidae. It was described by Achille Guenée in 1854. It is found in Brazil.
