= Desmia quadrinotalis =

Scientific classification
- Kingdom: Animalia
- Phylum: Arthropoda
- Class: Insecta
- Order: Lepidoptera
- Family: Crambidae
- Genus: Desmia
- Species: D. quadrinotalis

Binomial name
- Desmia quadrinotalis Herrich-Schäffer, 1871

Species of moth

Desmia quadrinotalis is a moth in the family Crambidae. It is found in Cuba.
