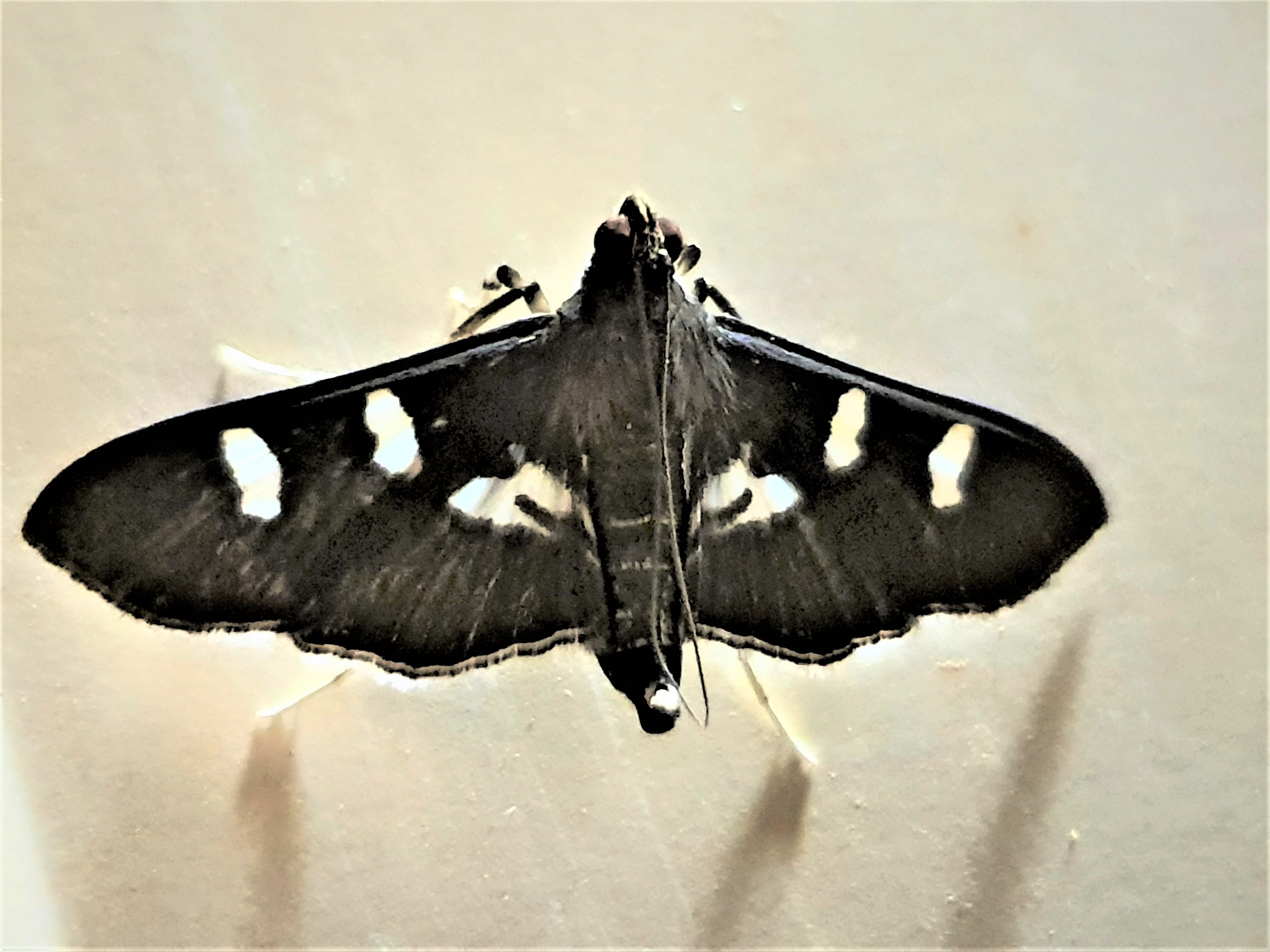

Scientific classification
- Domain: Eukaryota
- Kingdom: Animalia
- Phylum: Arthropoda
- Class: Insecta
- Order: Lepidoptera
- Family: Crambidae
- Genus: Desmia
- Species: D. tages

Binomial name
- Desmia tages (Cramer, 1777)

Synonyms
- Phalaena tages Cramer, 1777; Desmia sertorialis Herrich-Schäffer, 1871; Hyalitis tagesalis Guenée, 1854

= Desmia tages =

Species of moth

Desmia tages is a moth in the family Crambidae. It was described by Pieter Cramer in 1777. It is found in Cuba, Jamaica, Puerto Rico, Florida, Costa Rica, and Mexico.
