= Erupa somenella =

Scientific classification
- Kingdom: Animalia
- Phylum: Arthropoda
- Clade: Pancrustacea
- Class: Insecta
- Order: Lepidoptera
- Family: Crambidae
- Genus: Erupa
- Species: E. somenella

Binomial name
- Erupa somenella Schaus, 1922

Species of moth

Erupa somenella is a moth in the family Crambidae. It was described by William Schaus in 1922. It is found in Guatemala.
