= Erupa titanalis =

Scientific classification
- Kingdom: Animalia
- Phylum: Arthropoda
- Clade: Pancrustacea
- Class: Insecta
- Order: Lepidoptera
- Family: Crambidae
- Genus: Erupa
- Species: E. titanalis

Binomial name
- Erupa titanalis C. Felder, R. Felder & Rogenhofer, 1875

Synonyms
- Erupa titanialis Hampson, 1896

Species of moth

Erupa titanalis is a moth in the family Crambidae. It was described by Cajetan Felder, Rudolf Felder and Alois Friedrich Rogenhofer in 1875. It is found in Brazil.
