= Erupa nampa =

Scientific classification
- Kingdom: Animalia
- Phylum: Arthropoda
- Clade: Pancrustacea
- Class: Insecta
- Order: Lepidoptera
- Family: Crambidae
- Genus: Erupa
- Species: E. nampa

Binomial name
- Erupa nampa Schaus, 1929

Species of moth

Erupa nampa is a moth in the family Crambidae. It was described by William Schaus in 1929. It is found in Brazil (Santa Catharina).
