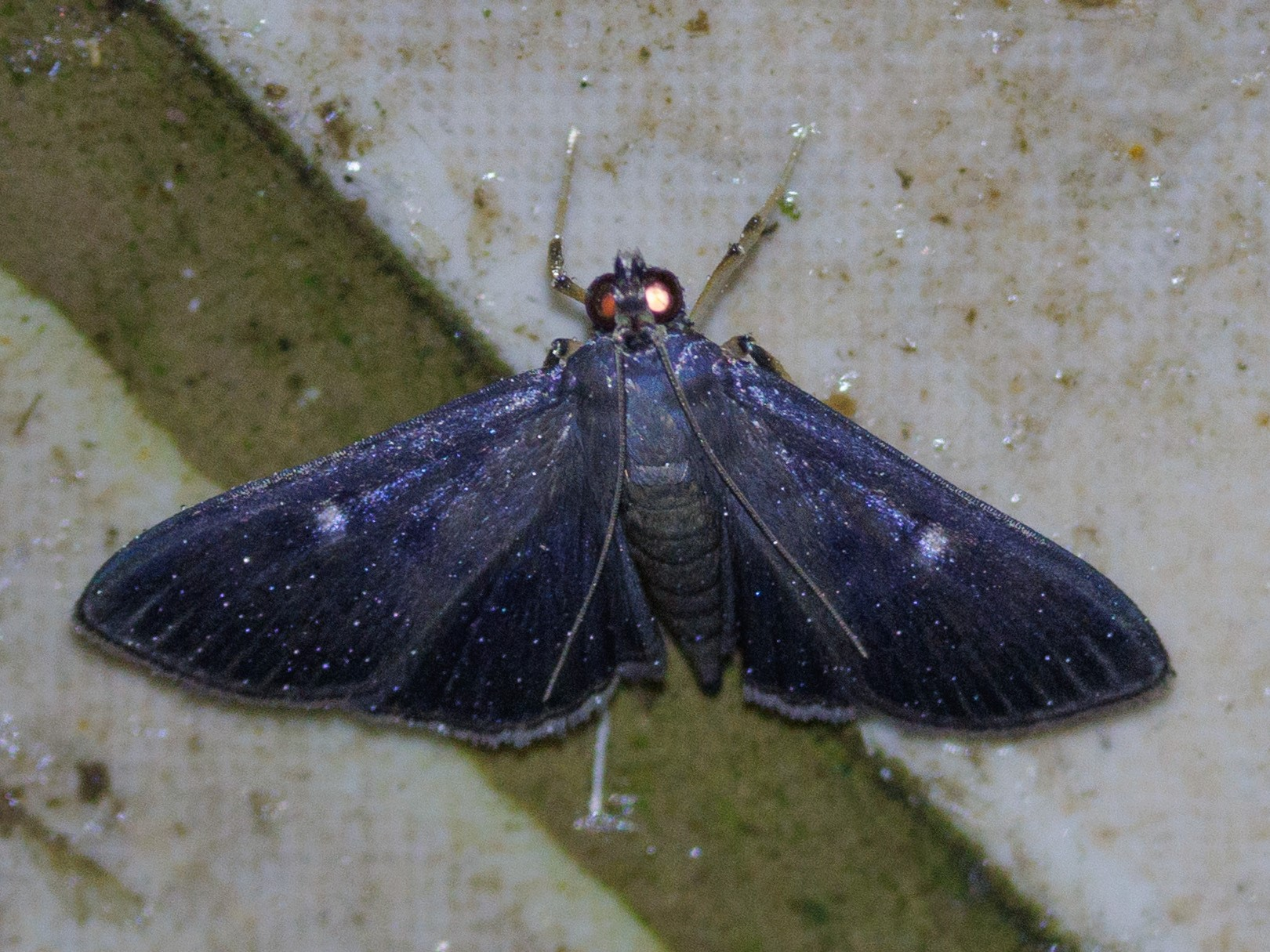

Scientific classification
- Domain: Eukaryota
- Kingdom: Animalia
- Phylum: Arthropoda
- Class: Insecta
- Order: Lepidoptera
- Family: Crambidae
- Genus: Desmia
- Species: D. unipunctalis

Binomial name
- Desmia unipunctalis (Druce, 1895)

Synonyms
- Aediodes unipunctalis Druce, 1895

= Desmia unipunctalis =

Species of moth

Desmia unipunctalis is a species of moth in the family Crambidae. It was described by Druce in 1895. It is found in Panama.
