= Desmia niveiciliata =

Scientific classification
- Kingdom: Animalia
- Phylum: Arthropoda
- Class: Insecta
- Order: Lepidoptera
- Family: Crambidae
- Genus: Desmia
- Species: D. niveiciliata

Binomial name
- Desmia niveiciliata E. Hering, 1906

Species of moth

Desmia niveiciliata is a moth in the family Crambidae. It was described by E. Hering in 1906. It is found on Haiti.
