= Erupa lactealis =

Scientific classification
- Kingdom: Animalia
- Phylum: Arthropoda
- Clade: Pancrustacea
- Class: Insecta
- Order: Lepidoptera
- Family: Crambidae
- Genus: Erupa
- Species: E. lactealis

Binomial name
- Erupa lactealis Hampson, 1896

Species of moth

Erupa lactealis is a moth in the family Crambidae. It was described by George Hampson in 1896. It is found in Rio de Janeiro, Brazil.
