= Conotalis aurantifascia =

Scientific classification
- Kingdom: Animalia
- Phylum: Arthropoda
- Class: Insecta
- Order: Lepidoptera
- Family: Crambidae
- Subfamily: incertae sedis
- Genus: Conotalis
- Species: C. aurantifascia

Binomial name
- Conotalis aurantifascia (Hampson, 1896)

Synonyms
- Charltona aurantifascia Hampson, 1896

Species of moth

Conotalis aurantifascia is a moth in the family Crambidae. It was described by George Hampson in 1896. It is found in Ghana, Nigeria, Sierra Leone and the Gambia.
