= Desmia melanalis =

Scientific classification
- Domain: Eukaryota
- Kingdom: Animalia
- Phylum: Arthropoda
- Class: Insecta
- Order: Lepidoptera
- Family: Crambidae
- Genus: Desmia
- Species: D. melanalis

Binomial name
- Desmia melanalis (C. Felder, R. Felder & Rogenhofer, 1875)

Synonyms
- Hyalea melanalis C. Felder, R. Felder & Rogenhofer, 1875

Species of moth

Desmia melanalis is a moth in the family Crambidae. It was described by Cajetan Felder, Rudolf Felder and Alois Friedrich Rogenhofer in 1875. It is found in Amazonas, Brazil.
