= Desmia grandisalis =

Scientific classification
- Domain: Eukaryota
- Kingdom: Animalia
- Phylum: Arthropoda
- Class: Insecta
- Order: Lepidoptera
- Family: Crambidae
- Genus: Desmia
- Species: D. grandisalis

Binomial name
- Desmia grandisalis Schaus, 1912

Species of moth

Desmia grandisalis is a moth in the family Crambidae. It was described by Schaus in 1912. It is found in Costa Rica.
