= Desmia flebilialis =

Scientific classification
- Kingdom: Animalia
- Phylum: Arthropoda
- Class: Insecta
- Order: Lepidoptera
- Family: Crambidae
- Genus: Desmia
- Species: D. flebilialis

Binomial name
- Desmia flebilialis (Guenée, 1854)

Synonyms
- Aediodes flebilialis Guenée, 1854

Species of moth

Desmia flebilialis is a moth in the family Crambidae. It was described by Achille Guenée in 1854. It is found in French Guiana.
