= Desmia peruviana =

Scientific classification
- Domain: Eukaryota
- Kingdom: Animalia
- Phylum: Arthropoda
- Class: Insecta
- Order: Lepidoptera
- Family: Crambidae
- Genus: Desmia
- Species: D. peruviana

Binomial name
- Desmia peruviana E. Hering, 1906

Synonyms
- Desmia tristigmalis Hampson, 1912

Species of moth

Desmia peruviana is a moth in the family Crambidae. It was described by E. Hering in 1906. It is found in Ecuador (Loja Province) and Peru.
