= Erupa huarmellus =

Scientific classification
- Kingdom: Animalia
- Phylum: Arthropoda
- Clade: Pancrustacea
- Class: Insecta
- Order: Lepidoptera
- Family: Crambidae
- Genus: Erupa
- Species: E. huarmellus

Binomial name
- Erupa huarmellus Schaus, 1922

Species of moth

Erupa huarmellus is a moth in the family Crambidae. It was described by William Schaus in 1922. It is found in Peru.
