= Desmia incomposita =

Scientific classification
- Domain: Eukaryota
- Kingdom: Animalia
- Phylum: Arthropoda
- Class: Insecta
- Order: Lepidoptera
- Family: Crambidae
- Genus: Desmia
- Species: D. incomposita

Binomial name
- Desmia incomposita (Bethune-Baker, 1909)

Synonyms
- Glyphodes incomposita Bethune-Baker, 1909; Desmia horaria Meyrick, 1937

Species of moth

Desmia incomposita is a moth in the family Crambidae. It was described by George Thomas Bethune-Baker in 1909. It is found in the Democratic Republic of the Congo (Orientale, Equateur) and Nigeria.

The larvae feed on Antiaris africana.
