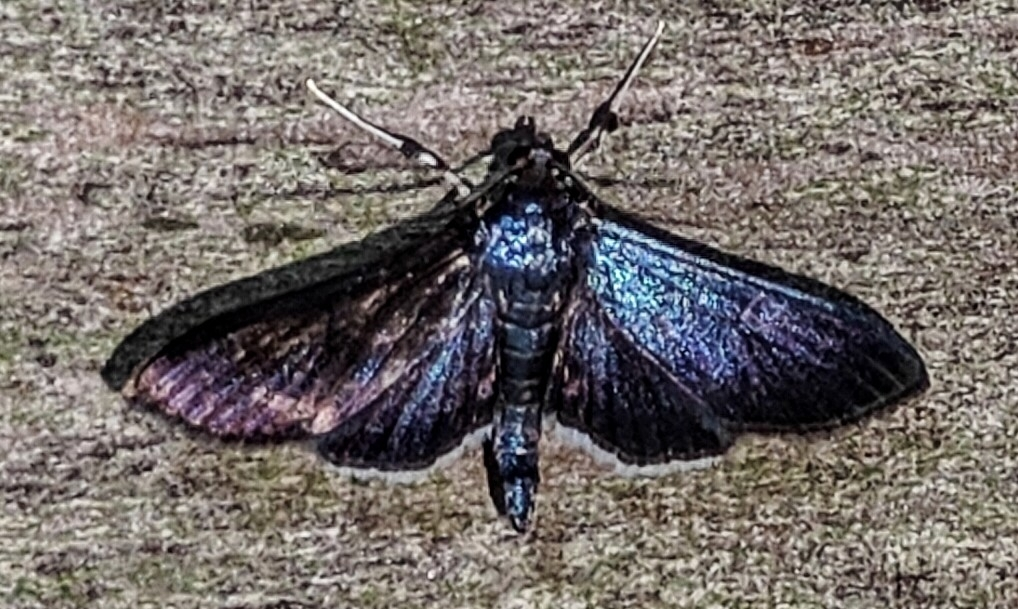

Scientific classification
- Kingdom: Animalia
- Phylum: Arthropoda
- Clade: Pancrustacea
- Class: Insecta
- Order: Lepidoptera
- Family: Crambidae
- Genus: Desmia
- Species: D. hadriana

Binomial name
- Desmia hadriana (H. Druce, 1895)

Synonyms
- Acridura hadriana H. Druce, 1895

= Desmia hadriana =

Species of moth

Desmia hadriana is a species of moth in the family Crambidae. It was first described by Herbert Druce in 1895. It is found in Panama and the Mexican states of Veracruz and Tabasco.
