= Desmia naclialis =

Scientific classification
- Kingdom: Animalia
- Phylum: Arthropoda
- Class: Insecta
- Order: Lepidoptera
- Family: Crambidae
- Genus: Desmia
- Species: D. naclialis

Binomial name
- Desmia naclialis Snellen, 1875

Species of moth

Desmia naclialis is a moth in the family Crambidae. It is found in Colombia.
