= Desmia deploralis =

Deploring desmia moth

Scientific classification
- Kingdom: Animalia
- Phylum: Arthropoda
- Class: Insecta
- Order: Lepidoptera
- Family: Crambidae
- Genus: Desmia
- Species: D. deploralis

Binomial name
- Desmia deploralis Hampson, 1912

Species of moth

Desmia deploralis, the deploring desmia moth, is a moth in the family Crambidae. It was described by George Hampson in 1912. It is found in Paraguay, Cuba, Jamaica and Florida.
