= Desmia cristinae =

Scientific classification
- Kingdom: Animalia
- Phylum: Arthropoda
- Class: Insecta
- Order: Lepidoptera
- Family: Crambidae
- Genus: Desmia
- Species: D. cristinae

Binomial name
- Desmia cristinae Schaus, 1912

Species of moth

Desmia cristinae is a moth in the family Crambidae. It was described by Schaus in 1912.

== Distribution ==
It is found in Costa Rica and Honduras.
