= Desmia discrepans =

Scientific classification
- Domain: Eukaryota
- Kingdom: Animalia
- Phylum: Arthropoda
- Class: Insecta
- Order: Lepidoptera
- Family: Crambidae
- Genus: Desmia
- Species: D. discrepans

Binomial name
- Desmia discrepans (Butler, 1887)

Synonyms
- Aediodes discrepans Butler, 1887; Desmia dissimulalis Rothschild, 1915

Species of moth

Desmia discrepans is a moth in the family Crambidae. It was described by Arthur Gardiner Butler in 1887. It is found in Papua New Guinea and on the Solomon Islands. It is also found in Australia, where it has been recorded from Queensland.

Adults are black with large white patches on the wings.

== Subspecies ==
- Desmia discrepans discrepans (Solomon Islands)
- Desmia discrepans dissimulalis Rothschild, 1915 (Papua New Guinea)
