= Desmia mesosticta =

Scientific classification
- Kingdom: Animalia
- Phylum: Arthropoda
- Class: Insecta
- Order: Lepidoptera
- Family: Crambidae
- Genus: Desmia
- Species: D. mesosticta

Binomial name
- Desmia mesosticta Hampson, 1912

Species of moth

Desmia mesosticta is a moth in the family Crambidae. It was described by George Hampson in 1912. It is found in Colombia.
