= Desmia leucothyris =

Scientific classification
- Domain: Eukaryota
- Kingdom: Animalia
- Phylum: Arthropoda
- Class: Insecta
- Order: Lepidoptera
- Family: Crambidae
- Genus: Desmia
- Species: D. leucothyris

Binomial name
- Desmia leucothyris (Dognin, 1909)

Synonyms
- Phryganodes leucothyris Dognin, 1909

Species of moth

Desmia leucothyris is a moth in the family Crambidae. It was described by Paul Dognin in 1909. It is found in French Guiana.
