= Schoenerupa =

Scientific classification
- Kingdom: Animalia
- Phylum: Arthropoda
- Clade: Pancrustacea
- Class: Insecta
- Order: Lepidoptera
- Family: Crambidae
- Subfamily: Erupinae
- Genus: Schoenerupa; Hampson, 1919
- Species: S. thermantis

Binomial name
- Schoenerupa thermantis Hampson, 1919

Genus of moths

Schoenerupa is a genus of moths of the family Crambidae. It contains only one species, Schoenerupa thermantis, which is found in Ecuador.
