= Erupa similis =

Scientific classification
- Kingdom: Animalia
- Phylum: Arthropoda
- Clade: Pancrustacea
- Class: Insecta
- Order: Lepidoptera
- Family: Crambidae
- Genus: Erupa
- Species: E. similis

Binomial name
- Erupa similis H. Druce, 1899

Species of moth

Erupa similis is a moth in the family Crambidae. It was described by Herbert Druce in 1899. It is found in Panama.
