= Desmia semirufalis =

Scientific classification
- Kingdom: Animalia
- Phylum: Arthropoda
- Class: Insecta
- Order: Lepidoptera
- Family: Crambidae
- Genus: Desmia
- Species: D. semirufalis

Binomial name
- Desmia semirufalis (Hampson, 1918)

Synonyms
- Margaronia semirufalis Hampson, 1918; Cryptographis semirufalis

Species of moth

Desmia semirufalis is a moth in the family Crambidae. It is found in Peru.
