= Erupa bilineatella =

Scientific classification
- Kingdom: Animalia
- Phylum: Arthropoda
- Clade: Pancrustacea
- Class: Insecta
- Order: Lepidoptera
- Family: Crambidae
- Genus: Erupa
- Species: E. bilineatella

Binomial name
- Erupa bilineatella (Walker, 1866)

Synonyms
- Gabalaeca bilineatella Walker, 1866

Species of moth

Erupa bilineatella is a moth in the family Crambidae. It was described by Francis Walker in 1866. It is found in Brazil.
