= Desmia strigivitralis =

Scientific classification
- Kingdom: Animalia
- Phylum: Arthropoda
- Class: Insecta
- Order: Lepidoptera
- Family: Crambidae
- Genus: Desmia
- Species: D. strigivitralis

Binomial name
- Desmia strigivitralis (Guenée, 1854)

Synonyms
- Aediodes strigivitralis Guenée, 1854

Species of moth

Desmia strigivitralis is a moth in the family Crambidae. It was described by Achille Guenée in 1854. It is found in Brazil.
