= Erupa congruella =

Scientific classification
- Kingdom: Animalia
- Phylum: Arthropoda
- Clade: Pancrustacea
- Class: Insecta
- Order: Lepidoptera
- Family: Crambidae
- Genus: Erupa
- Species: E. congruella

Binomial name
- Erupa congruella (Walker, 1867)

Synonyms
- Zolca congruella Walker, 1866; Chilo virgatus C. Felder, R. Felder & Rogenhofer, 1875

Species of moth

Erupa congruella is a moth in the family Crambidae. It was described by Francis Walker in 1866. It is found in Brazil and Venezuela.
