= Desmia lycopusalis =

Scientific classification
- Kingdom: Animalia
- Phylum: Arthropoda
- Class: Insecta
- Order: Lepidoptera
- Family: Crambidae
- Genus: Desmia
- Species: D. lycopusalis

Binomial name
- Desmia lycopusalis Walker, 1859

Species of moth

Desmia lycopusalis is a moth in the family Crambidae. It was described by Francis Walker in 1859. It is found on Borneo.
