= Desmia daedala =

Scientific classification
- Domain: Eukaryota
- Kingdom: Animalia
- Phylum: Arthropoda
- Class: Insecta
- Order: Lepidoptera
- Family: Crambidae
- Genus: Desmia
- Species: D. daedala

Binomial name
- Desmia daedala (H. Druce, 1895)

Synonyms
- Acridura daedala H. Druce, 1895

Species of moth

Desmia daedala is a moth in the family Crambidae. It was described by Herbert Druce in 1895. It is found in Panama.
