= Desmia revindicata =

Scientific classification
- Domain: Eukaryota
- Kingdom: Animalia
- Phylum: Arthropoda
- Class: Insecta
- Order: Lepidoptera
- Family: Crambidae
- Genus: Desmia
- Species: D. revindicata

Binomial name
- Desmia revindicata E. Hering, 1906

Synonyms
- Desmia mapirica Strand, 1920

Species of moth

Desmia revindicata is a moth in the family Crambidae. It was described by E. Hering in 1906. It is found in Bolivia and Peru.
