= Desmia ceresalis =

Scientific classification
- Kingdom: Animalia
- Phylum: Arthropoda
- Class: Insecta
- Order: Lepidoptera
- Family: Crambidae
- Genus: Desmia
- Species: D. ceresalis

Binomial name
- Desmia ceresalis Walker, 1859

Synonyms
- Desmia imparalis Herrich-Schäffer, 1871

Species of moth

Desmia ceresalis is a moth in the family Crambidae. It was described by Francis Walker in 1859. It is found in Jamaica, Cuba and Puerto Rico.
