= Desmia pentodontalis =

Scientific classification
- Kingdom: Animalia
- Phylum: Arthropoda
- Class: Insecta
- Order: Lepidoptera
- Family: Crambidae
- Genus: Desmia
- Species: D. pentodontalis

Binomial name
- Desmia pentodontalis Hampson, 1898

Species of moth

Desmia pentodontalis is a moth of the family Crambidae described by George Hampson in 1989. It is found in Ecuador.

The wingspan is about 34 mm. The forewings are black-brown with a cupreous tinge and with a hyaline (glass-like) spot in the cell, as well as a lunulate (crescent-shaped) spot in the end of the cell and a lunulate spot below the cell with a whitish mark below it. There is a hyaline postmedial band. There is irregular medial hyaline band on the hindwings, as well as an irregular postmedial line.
