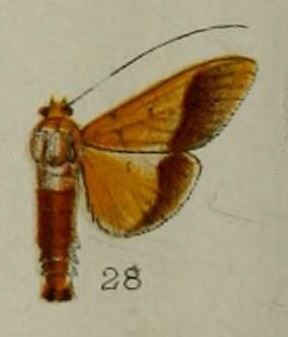

Scientific classification
- Kingdom: Animalia
- Phylum: Arthropoda
- Class: Insecta
- Order: Lepidoptera
- Family: Crambidae
- Genus: Desmia
- Species: D. chryseis

Binomial name
- Desmia chryseis Hampson, 1898

Synonyms
- Desmia chryseis ab. briseis Hering, 1906

= Desmia chryseis =

Species of moth

Desmia chryseis is a moth in the family Crambidae. It was described by George Hampson in 1898. It is found in Venezuela and Peru.

The wingspan is about 32 mm. The forewings are orange yellow with a purplish-fuscous antemedial line and base of the costa. The terminal third is purplish fuscous except on the costa. The hindwings have a purplish-fuscous band on the termen.
