= Erupa rhaetia =

Scientific classification
- Kingdom: Animalia
- Phylum: Arthropoda
- Clade: Pancrustacea
- Class: Insecta
- Order: Lepidoptera
- Family: Crambidae
- Genus: Erupa
- Species: E. rhaetia

Binomial name
- Erupa rhaetia H. Druce, 1900

Species of moth

Erupa rhaetia is a moth in the family Crambidae. It was first described by Herbert Druce in 1900. It is found in Colombia.
