= Desmia girtealis =

Scientific classification
- Domain: Eukaryota
- Kingdom: Animalia
- Phylum: Arthropoda
- Class: Insecta
- Order: Lepidoptera
- Family: Crambidae
- Genus: Desmia
- Species: D. girtealis

Binomial name
- Desmia girtealis Schaus, 1920

Species of moth

Desmia girtealis is a moth in the family Crambidae. It was described by Schaus in 1920. It is found in Peru.
