= Desmia desmialis =

Scientific classification
- Domain: Eukaryota
- Kingdom: Animalia
- Phylum: Arthropoda
- Class: Insecta
- Order: Lepidoptera
- Family: Crambidae
- Genus: Desmia
- Species: D. desmialis

Binomial name
- Desmia desmialis (Barnes & McDunnough, 1914)

Synonyms
- Ercta desmialis Barnes & McDunnough, 1914; Hymenia kaeberalis Haimbach, 1915

Species of moth

Desmia desmialis is a moth in the family Crambidae. It was described by William Barnes and James Halliday McDunnough in 1914. It is found in North America, where it has been recorded from Arizona.

The wingspan is 17–20 mm. The forewings are brown over a whitish ground color. There is a quadrate white patch near end of the cell, bordered laterally by black lines. Below this is a second similar patch and a third white irregular oval patch occupying the subterminal area. This patch is outlined in black and connected with the costa by a dark streak. The hindwings are brown crossed in the median area by two semiparallel waved dark lines. The space between these lines is whitish sprinkled with brown scales.
