= Desmia lacrimalis =

Scientific classification
- Kingdom: Animalia
- Phylum: Arthropoda
- Class: Insecta
- Order: Lepidoptera
- Family: Crambidae
- Genus: Desmia
- Species: D. lacrimalis

Binomial name
- Desmia lacrimalis Hampson, 1912

Species of moth

Desmia lacrimalis is a moth in the family Crambidae. It was described by George Hampson in 1912. It is found in Brazil.
