= Desmia tetratocera =

Scientific classification
- Kingdom: Animalia
- Phylum: Arthropoda
- Class: Insecta
- Order: Lepidoptera
- Family: Crambidae
- Genus: Desmia
- Species: D. tetratocera

Binomial name
- Desmia tetratocera Dyar, 1914

Species of moth

Desmia tetratocera is a moth in the family Crambidae described by Harrison Gray Dyar Jr. in 1914. It is found in Panama.

The wingspan is about 27 mm.
