= Erupa cluaca =

Scientific classification
- Kingdom: Animalia
- Phylum: Arthropoda
- Clade: Pancrustacea
- Class: Insecta
- Order: Lepidoptera
- Family: Crambidae
- Genus: Erupa
- Species: E. cluaca

Binomial name
- Erupa cluaca H. Druce, 1900

Synonyms
- Erupa clanca Błeszyński & Collins, 1962

Species of moth

Erupa cluaca is a moth in the family Crambidae. It was described by Herbert Druce in 1900. It is found in Colombia.
