= Erupa olorana =

Scientific classification
- Kingdom: Animalia
- Phylum: Arthropoda
- Clade: Pancrustacea
- Class: Insecta
- Order: Lepidoptera
- Family: Crambidae
- Genus: Erupa
- Species: E. olorana

Binomial name
- Erupa olorana Schaus, 1934

Species of moth

Erupa olorana is a moth in the family Crambidae. It was described by William Schaus in 1934. It is found in Brazil (Rio de Janeiro).
