= Desmia microstictalis =

Scientific classification
- Kingdom: Animalia
- Phylum: Arthropoda
- Class: Insecta
- Order: Lepidoptera
- Family: Crambidae
- Genus: Desmia
- Species: D. microstictalis

Binomial name
- Desmia microstictalis Hampson, 1904

Species of moth

Desmia microstictalis is a moth in the family Crambidae. It was described by George Hampson in 1904. It is found in the Bahamas.

The wingspan is about 24 mm. The forewings are black with two white points at the base and an antemedial bar in the cell, as well as an elliptical patch beyond the cell. There is an antemedial white patch on the hindwings, followed by a fine white line below the cell. There is an irregular patch beyond the cell and a fine white terminal line.
