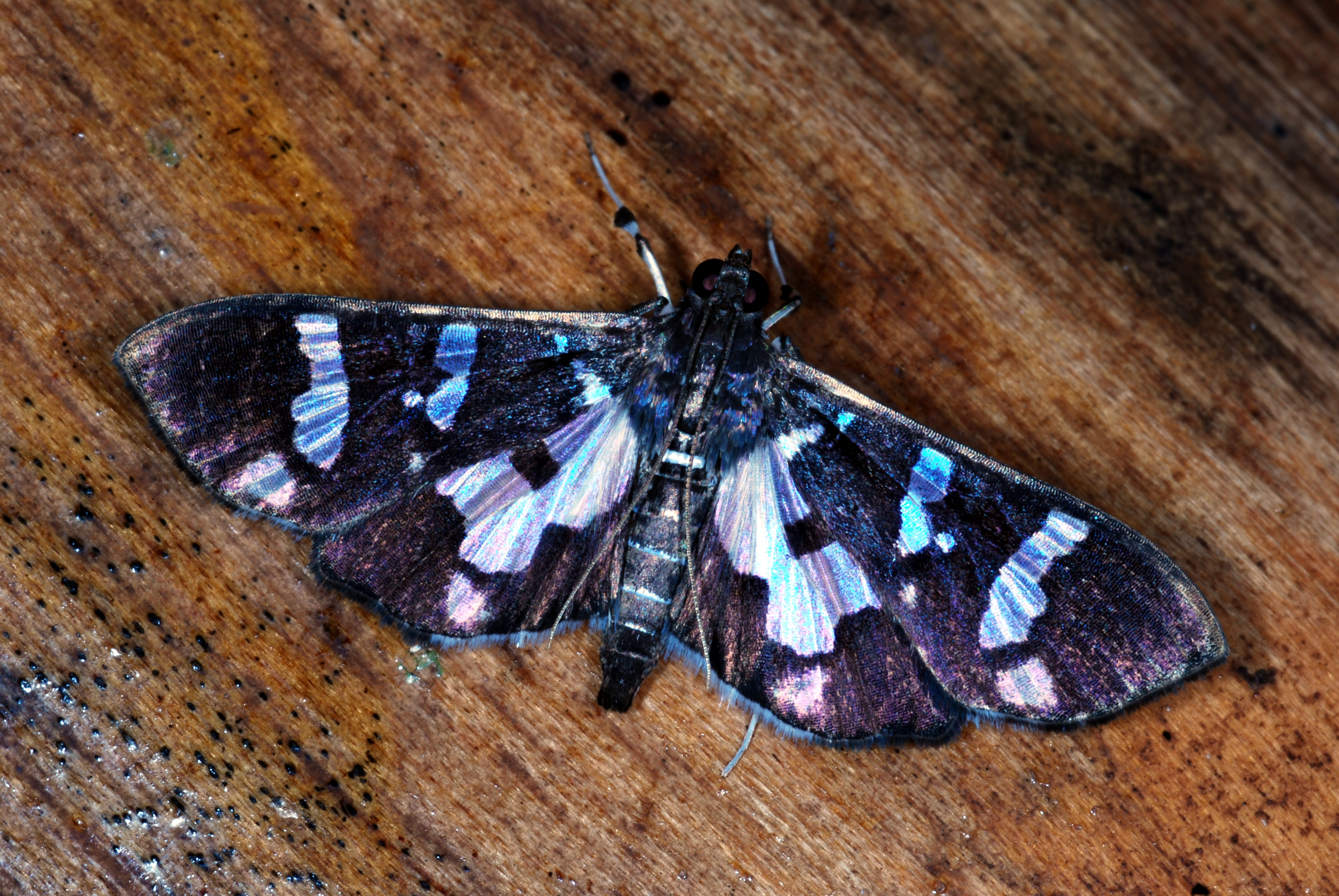
- Desmia bajulalis - Black Rock Lodge, San Ignacio, BELIZE

Scientific classification
- Kingdom: Animalia
- Phylum: Arthropoda
- Class: Insecta
- Order: Lepidoptera
- Family: Crambidae
- Genus: Desmia
- Species: D. bajulalis

Binomial name
- Desmia bajulalis (Guenée, 1854)

Synonyms
- Hyalitis bajulalis Guenée, 1854; Glyphodes dermatalis C. Felder, R. Felder & Rogenhofer, 1875

= Desmia bajulalis =

Species of moth

Desmia bajulalis is a moth in the family Crambidae. It was described by Achille Guenée in 1854. It is found in Central and South America.
