= Desmia intermicalis =

Scientific classification
- Kingdom: Animalia
- Phylum: Arthropoda
- Class: Insecta
- Order: Lepidoptera
- Family: Crambidae
- Genus: Desmia
- Species: D. intermicalis

Binomial name
- Desmia intermicalis (Guenée, 1854)

Synonyms
- Aediodes intermicalis Guenée, 1854

Species of moth

Desmia intermicalis is a moth in the family Crambidae. It was described by Achille Guenée in 1854. It is found in Brazil.
