= Desmia recurvalis =

Scientific classification
- Domain: Eukaryota
- Kingdom: Animalia
- Phylum: Arthropoda
- Class: Insecta
- Order: Lepidoptera
- Family: Crambidae
- Genus: Desmia
- Species: D. recurvalis

Binomial name
- Desmia recurvalis Schaus, 1940

Species of moth

Desmia recurvalis is a moth in the family Crambidae. It was described by Schaus in 1940. It is found in Cuba and Puerto Rico.
