= Desmia parastigma =

Scientific classification
- Kingdom: Animalia
- Phylum: Arthropoda
- Class: Insecta
- Order: Lepidoptera
- Family: Crambidae
- Genus: Desmia
- Species: D. parastigma

Binomial name
- Desmia parastigma Dyar, 1914

Species of moth

Desmia parastigma is a moth of the family Crambidae described by Harrison Gray Dyar Jr. in 1914. It is found in Panama and Costa Rica.

The wingspan is about 29 mm. The forewings are black with two white hyaline (glass-like) spots. The costa of the hindwings is washed with sordid (dirty) whitish and there is a little white dash across the cell, as well as a long whitish streak from the subcostal area to the tornus.
