= Desmia odontoplaga =

Scientific classification
- Kingdom: Animalia
- Phylum: Arthropoda
- Class: Insecta
- Order: Lepidoptera
- Family: Crambidae
- Genus: Desmia
- Species: D. odontoplaga

Binomial name
- Desmia odontoplaga Hampson, 1898

Synonyms
- Desmia aclistalis Dyar, 1914

Species of moth

Desmia odontoplaga is a moth in the family Crambidae described by George Hampson in 1898. It is found in Panama and Brazil (Paraná, Lower Amazons).

The wingspan is about 20 mm. The forewings are fuscous brown with a cupreous tinge. There is an elliptic white spot in and below the middle of the cell with a speck beyond its lower point and an obscure line from it to the inner margin, as well as a white postmedial patch. There is a large medial white patch on the hindwings.
