= Erupa adiposalis =

Scientific classification
- Kingdom: Animalia
- Phylum: Arthropoda
- Clade: Pancrustacea
- Class: Insecta
- Order: Lepidoptera
- Family: Crambidae
- Genus: Erupa
- Species: E. adiposalis

Binomial name
- Erupa adiposalis (Dognin, 1912)

Synonyms
- Pionea adiposalis Dognin, 1912

Species of moth

Erupa adiposalis is a moth in the family Crambidae. It was described by Paul Dognin in 1912. It is found in Colombia.
