= Desmia albisectalis =

Scientific classification
- Domain: Eukaryota
- Kingdom: Animalia
- Phylum: Arthropoda
- Class: Insecta
- Order: Lepidoptera
- Family: Crambidae
- Genus: Desmia
- Species: D. albisectalis

Binomial name
- Desmia albisectalis (Dognin, 1905)

Synonyms
- Nacoleia albisectalis Dognin, 1905; Desmia ufeodalis Hampson, 1912

Species of moth

Desmia albisectalis is a moth in the family Crambidae. It was described by Paul Dognin in 1905. It is found in Mexico (Tabasco) and Costa Rica.
