= Desmia albitarsalis =

Scientific classification
- Kingdom: Animalia
- Phylum: Arthropoda
- Class: Insecta
- Order: Lepidoptera
- Family: Crambidae
- Genus: Desmia
- Species: D. albitarsalis

Binomial name
- Desmia albitarsalis Hampson, 1917

Species of moth

Desmia albitarsalis is a moth in the family Crambidae. It is found in Venezuela.
