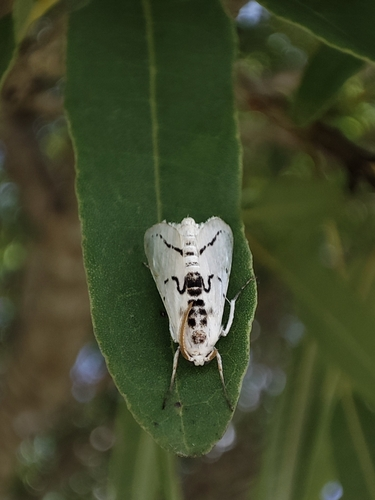

Scientific classification
- Kingdom: Animalia
- Phylum: Arthropoda
- Class: Insecta
- Order: Lepidoptera
- Family: Crambidae
- Genus: Linosta
- Species: L. sinceralis

Binomial name
- Linosta sinceralis Möschler, 1882

= Linosta sinceralis =

Species of moth

Linosta sinceralis is a moth in the family Crambidae. It was described by Heinrich Benno Möschler in 1882. It is found throughout Central and South America.

== Subspecies ==
- Linosta sinceralis sinceralis (the Guianas, Suriname, the Amazons and possibly Venezuela)
- Linosta sinceralis andina Munroe, 1959 (Ecuador, Colombia and Peru)
- Linosta sinceralis centralis Munroe, 1959 (Central America)
- Linosta sinceralis plaumanni Munroe, 1959 (southern Brazil)
