= Desmia bourguignoni =

Scientific classification
- Domain: Eukaryota
- Kingdom: Animalia
- Phylum: Arthropoda
- Class: Insecta
- Order: Lepidoptera
- Family: Crambidae
- Genus: Desmia
- Species: D. bourguignoni

Binomial name
- Desmia bourguignoni Ghesquière, 1942

Synonyms
- Desmia bourguignoni ab. badia Ghesquière, 1942

Species of moth

Desmia bourguignoni is a moth in the family Crambidae. It was described by Jean Ghesquière in 1942. It is found in the former Katanga Province of the Democratic Republic of the Congo.
