= Desmia extrema =

Scientific classification
- Kingdom: Animalia
- Phylum: Arthropoda
- Class: Insecta
- Order: Lepidoptera
- Family: Crambidae
- Genus: Desmia
- Species: D. extrema

Binomial name
- Desmia extrema (Walker, 1856)

Synonyms
- Arna extrema Walker, 1856

Species of moth

Desmia extrema is a moth in the family Crambidae. It was described by Francis Walker in 1856. It is found in Brazil.
