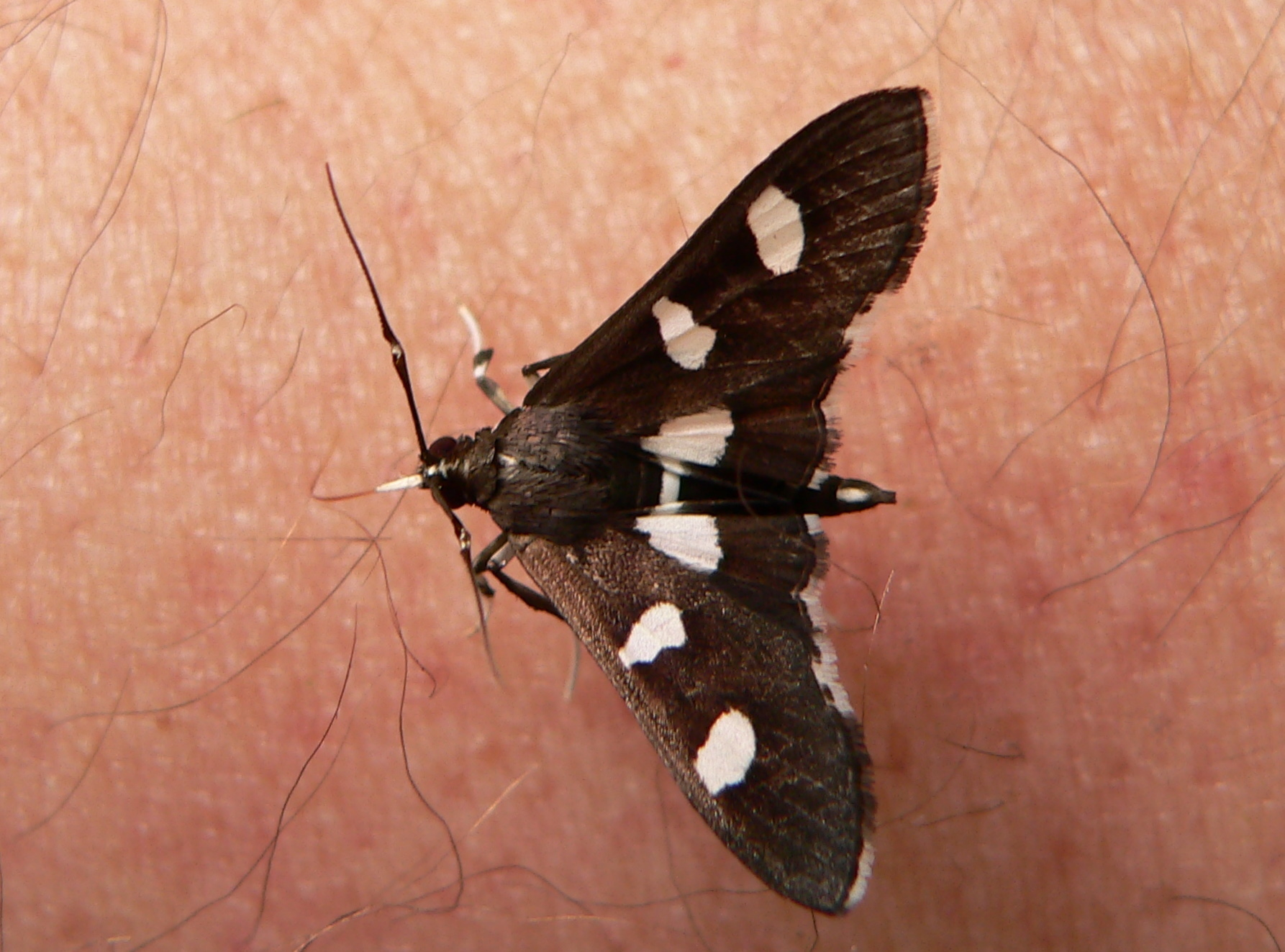
- Grape leaffolder (Desmia funeralis)

Scientific classification
- Kingdom: Animalia
- Phylum: Arthropoda
- Class: Insecta
- Order: Lepidoptera
- Family: Crambidae
- Subfamily: Spilomelinae
- Genus: Desmia; Westwood, 1832

Synonyms
- Aediodes Guenée, 1854; Arna Walker, 1856; Hyalitis Guenée, 1854

= Desmia =

Genus of moths

Desmia is a genus of moths of the family Crambidae. The genus was erected by John O. Westwood in 1832.

The majority of species are found in South and Central America, though there are species in Africa, Asia, and North America. Most Desmia are small brown moths with variable white spots on the wings, although some such as Desmia flavalis are orange without white markings. Others, like Desmia filicornis, have a blue-green sheen. The end of the abdomen is often curved upward. The larvae are generally small leafroller caterpillars and some species, such as Desmia funeralis, are known to be agricultural pests on grapevines. Southern New World species may feed on wild coffee. Desmia species in North America are visually similar and often must be distinguished by DNA or genitalia.

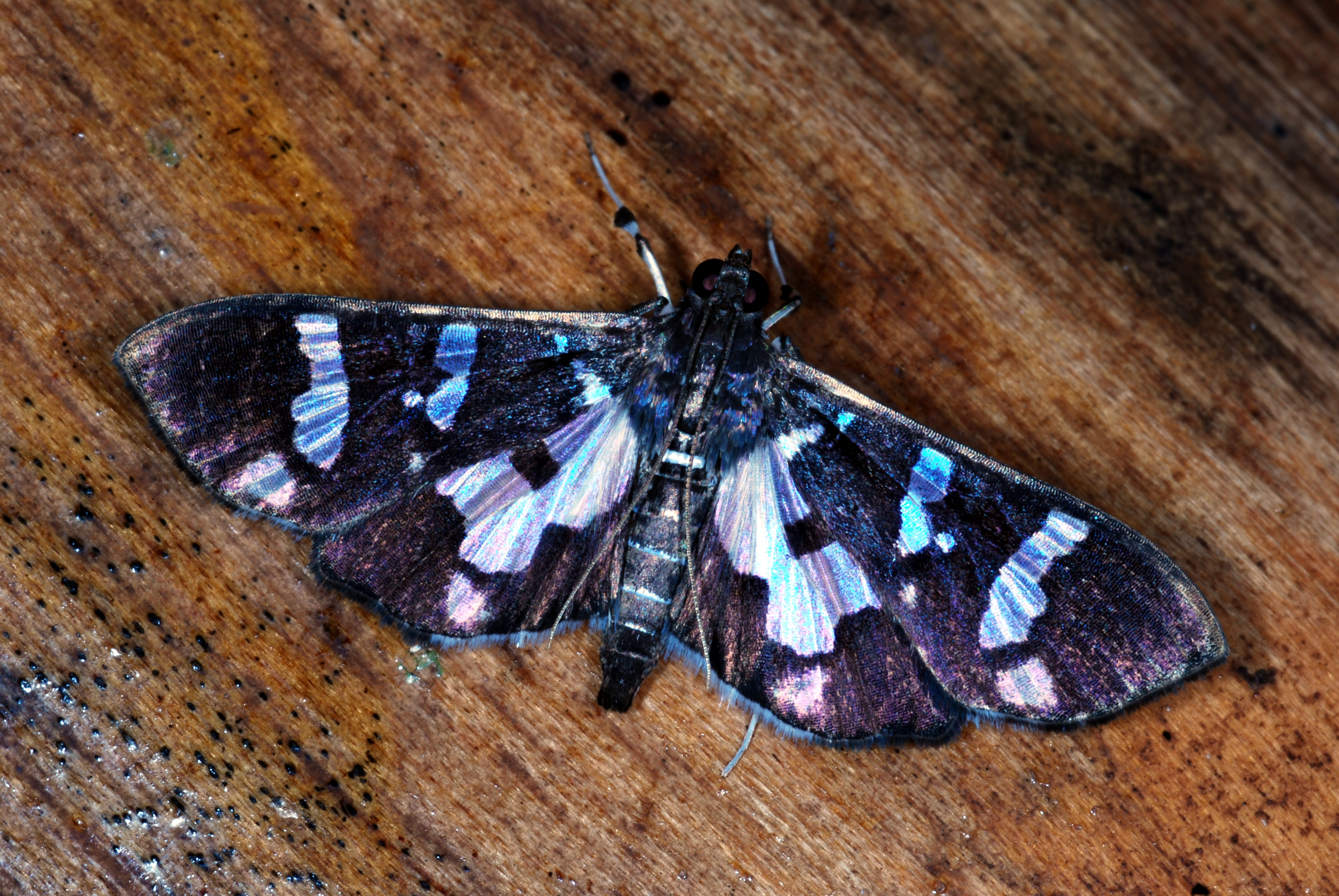
Desmia bajulalis

== Species ==
- Desmia albisectalis (Dognin, 1905)
- Desmia albitarsalis Hampson, 1917
- Desmia angustalis Schaus, 1920
- Desmia anitalis Schaus, 1920
- Desmia bajulalis (Guenée, 1854)
- Desmia benealis Schaus, 1920
- Desmia bifidalis Hampson, 1912
- Desmia bigeminalis (Dognin, 1905)
- Desmia bourguignoni Ghesquière, 1942
- Desmia ceresalis Walker, 1859
- Desmia chryseis Hampson, 1898
- Desmia ciliata (Swinhoe, 1894)
- Desmia clarkei Amsel, 1956
- Desmia clytialis Walker, 1859
- Desmia cristinae Schaus, 1912
- Desmia ctenuchalis (Dognin, 1907)
- Desmia daedala (Druce, 1895)
- Desmia decemmaculalis Amsel, 1956
- Desmia dentipuncta Hampson, 1912
- Desmia deploralis Hampson, 1912
- Desmia desmialis (Barnes & McDunnough, 1914)
- Desmia discrepans (Butler, 1887)
- Desmia extrema (Walker, 1856)
- Desmia falcatalis E. Hering, 1906
- Desmia filicornis Munroe, 1959
- Desmia flavalis Schaus, 1912
- Desmia flebilialis (Guenée, 1854)
- Desmia funebralis Guenée, 1854
- Desmia funeralis (Hübner, 1796)
- Desmia geminalis Snellen, 1875
- Desmia geminipuncta Hampson, 1912
- Desmia girtealis Schaus, 1920
- Desmia grandisalis Schaus, 1912
- Desmia hadriana (Druce, 1895)
- Desmia herrichialis E. Hering, 1906
- Desmia hoffmannsi E. Hering, 1906
- Desmia ilsalis Schaus, 1920
- Desmia incomposita (Bethune-Baker, 1909)
- Desmia intermicalis (Guenée, 1854)
- Desmia jonesalis Schaus, 1920
- Desmia julialis Schaus, 1920
- Desmia lacrimalis Hampson, 1912
- Desmia leucothyris (Dognin, 1909)
- Desmia lycopusalis Walker, 1859
- Desmia melaleucalis Hampson, 1899
- Desmia melanalis (C. Felder, R. Felder & Rogenhofer, 1875)
- Desmia melanopalis Hampson, 1912
- Desmia mesosticta Hampson, 1912
- Desmia microstictalis Hampson, 1904
- Desmia minnalis Schaus, 1920
- Desmia mortualis Hampson, 1912
- Desmia naclialis Snellen, 1875
- Desmia natalialis Schaus, 1920
- Desmia niveiciliata E. Hering, 1906
- Desmia octomaculalis Amsel, 1956
- Desmia odontoplaga Hampson, 1898
- Desmia pantalis Dyar, 1927
- Desmia parastigma Dyar, 1927
- Desmia paucimaculalis Hampson, 1898
- Desmia pentodontalis Hampson, 1898
- Desmia perfecta Butler, 1882
- Desmia peruviana E. Hering, 1906
- Desmia phaiorrhoea Dyar, 1914
- Desmia pisusalis Walker, 1859
- Desmia ploralis (Guenée, 1854)
- Desmia quadrimaculata E. Hering, 1906
- Desmia quadrinotalis Herrich-Schäffer, 1871
- Desmia recurvalis Schaus, 1940
- Desmia revindicata E. Hering, 1906
- Desmia ruptilinealis Hampson, 1912
- Desmia semirufalis (Hampson, 1918)
- Desmia semivacualis Dognin, 1903
- Desmia sepulchralis Guenée, 1854
- Desmia stenizonalis Hampson, 1912
- Desmia stenoleuca Hampson, 1912
- Desmia strigivitralis (Guenée, 1854)
- Desmia subdivisalis Grote, 1871
- Desmia tages (Cramer, 1777)
- Desmia tellesalis Walker, 1859
- Desmia tenuimaculata Hering, 1906
- Desmia tenuizona Hampson, 1912
- Desmia tetratocera Dyar, 1914
- Desmia trimaculalis E. Hering, 1906
- Desmia ufeus (Cramer, 1777)
- Desmia unipunctalis (Druce, 1895)
- Desmia validalis Dognin, 1903
- Desmia vicina Dognin, 1906
- Desmia vulcanalis (C. Felder, R. Felder & Rogenhofer, 1875)
- Desmia zebinalis Walker, 1859

== Former species ==
- Desmia horaria Meyrick, 1937, now Desmia incomposita (Bethune-Baker, 1909)

== Status unknown ==
- Desmia sextalis
