= Desmia decemmaculalis =

Scientific classification
- Domain: Eukaryota
- Kingdom: Animalia
- Phylum: Arthropoda
- Class: Insecta
- Order: Lepidoptera
- Family: Crambidae
- Genus: Desmia
- Species: D. decemmaculalis

Binomial name
- Desmia decemmaculalis Amsel, 1956

Species of moth

Desmia decemmaculalis is a moth in the family Crambidae. It is found in Venezuela.
