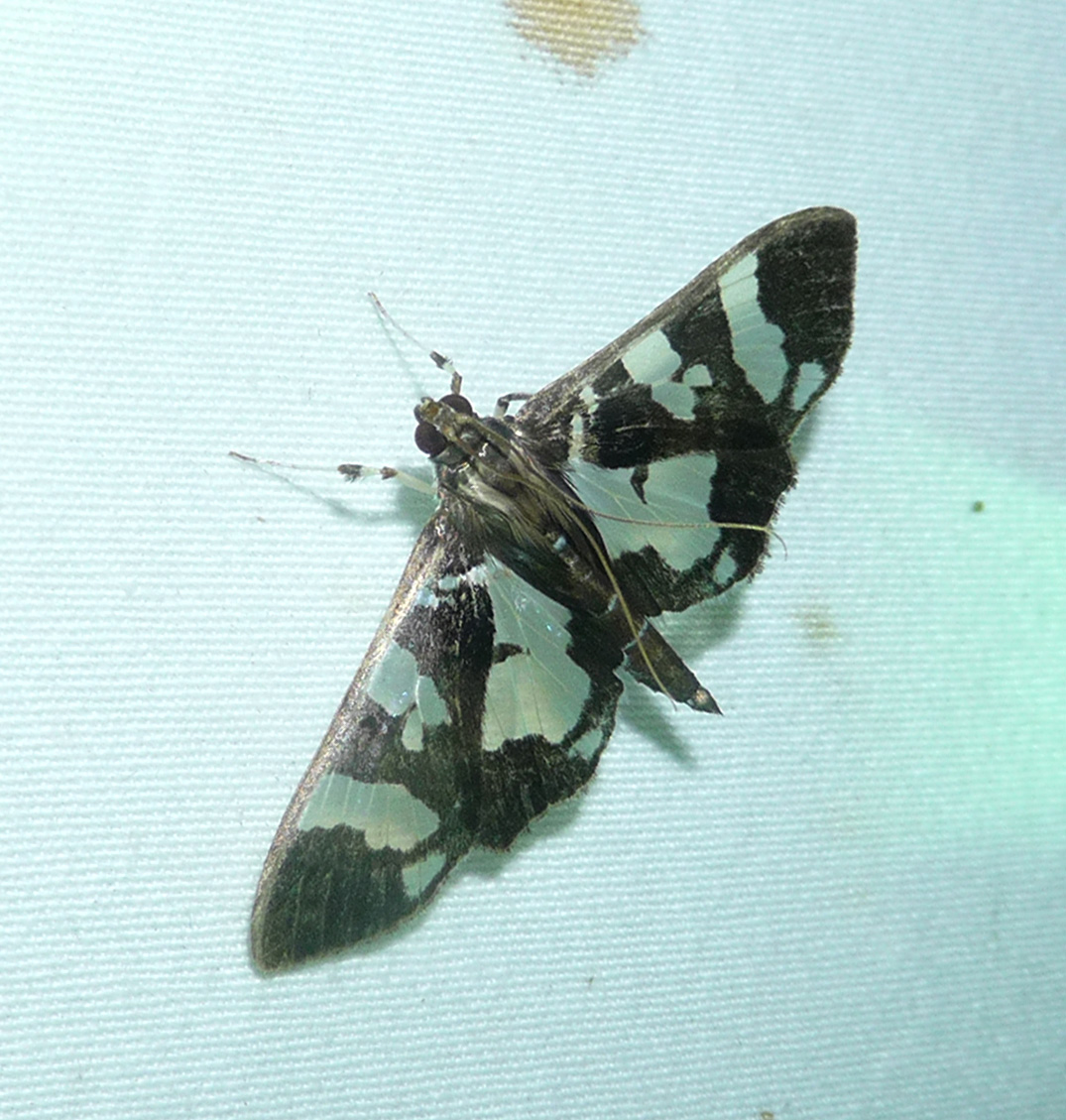

Scientific classification
- Domain: Eukaryota
- Kingdom: Animalia
- Phylum: Arthropoda
- Class: Insecta
- Order: Lepidoptera
- Family: Crambidae
- Genus: Desmia
- Species: D. ufeus

Binomial name
- Desmia ufeus (Cramer, 1777)

Synonyms
- Phalaena (Noctua) ufeus Cramer, 1777; Aediodes orbalis Guenée, 1854; Desmia bulisalis Walker, 1859; Desmia divisalis Walker, 1866; Desmia prognealis Walker, 1859; Desmia viduatalis Möschler, 1890; Hyalitis ufealis Guenée, 1854

= Desmia ufeus =

Species of moth

Desmia ufeus is a moth in the family Crambidae. It was described by Pieter Cramer in 1777. It is found in Suriname, French Guiana, Costa Rica, Mexico, the Dominican Republic, Puerto Rico, Jamaica, Cuba and Florida.

The wingspan is about 23 mm. Adults are on wing year round.
