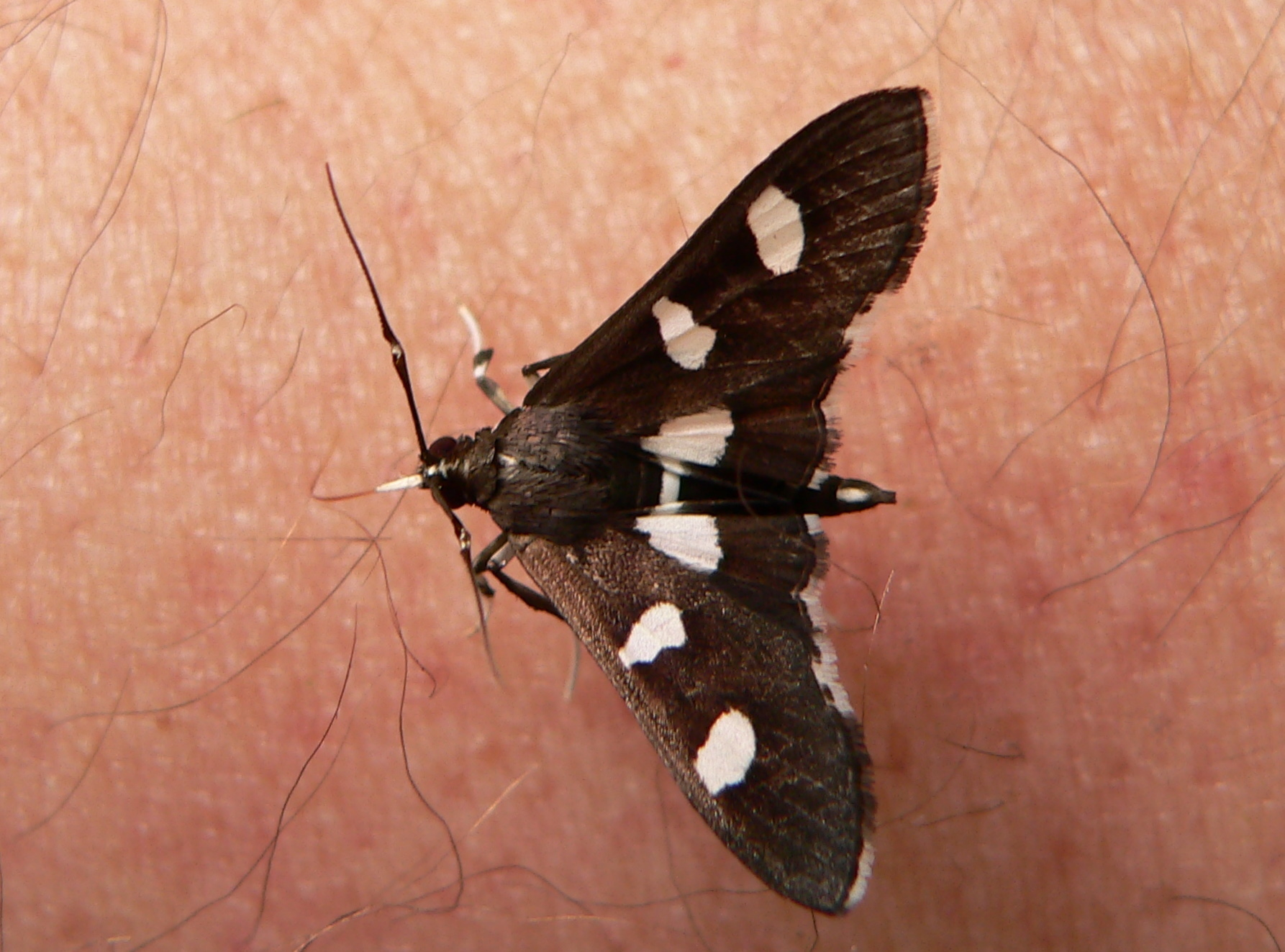

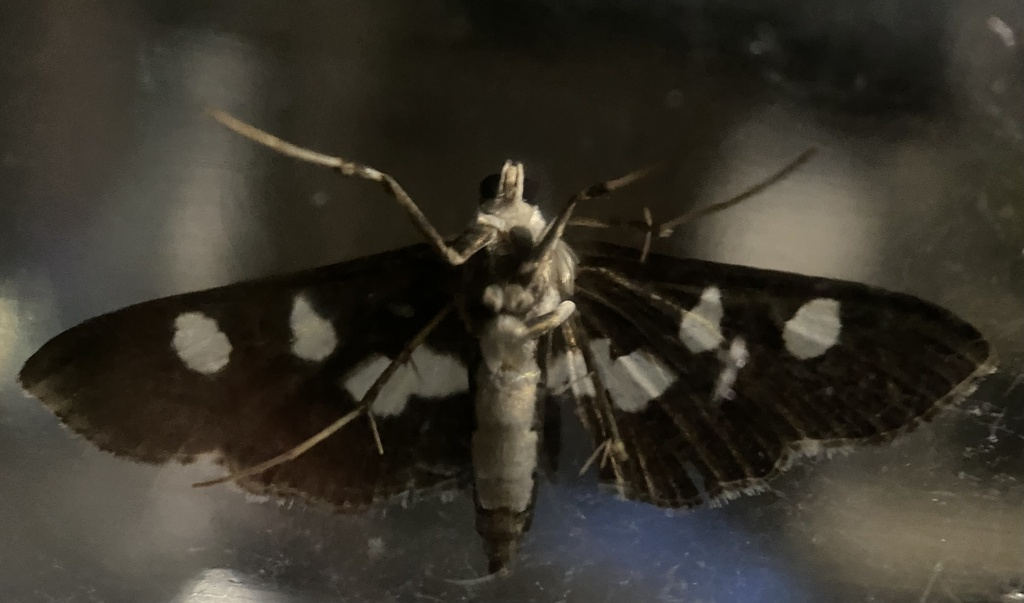

Scientific classification
- Kingdom: Animalia
- Phylum: Arthropoda
- Clade: Pancrustacea
- Class: Insecta
- Order: Lepidoptera
- Family: Crambidae
- Genus: Desmia
- Species: D. funeralis

Binomial name
- Desmia funeralis (Hübner, 1796)

Synonyms
- Pyralis funeralis Hübner, 1796; Desmia maculalis Westwood, 1832

= Desmia funeralis =

Grape leaffolder

Species of moth

Desmia funeralis, the grape leaffolder, is a moth of the family Crambidae. It is found across the southern parts of the United States to California, north to the northeastern states and southeastern Canada.

The wingspan is 21–28 mm. From a top-down perspective, D. funeralis appears identical to D. maculalis. Adults are on wing from May to September. It is a day-flying species. There are two to three generations per year.

The larvae feed on Vitis, Cercis canadensis and Oenothera. It is considered a minor pest of grapes in the United States.
