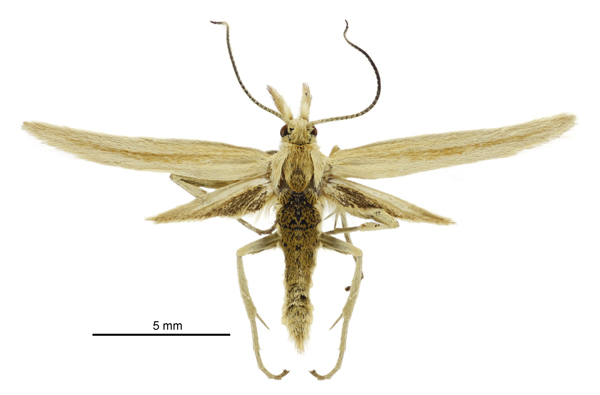
- Exsilirarcha graminea

Scientific classification
- Kingdom: Animalia
- Phylum: Arthropoda
- Class: Insecta
- Order: Lepidoptera
- Family: Crambidae
- Subfamily: incertae sedis
- Genus: Exsilirarcha; Salmon & Bradley, 1956
- Species: E. graminea

Binomial name
- Exsilirarcha graminea Salmon & Bradley, 1956

= Exsilirarcha =

Genus of moths

Exsilirarcha is a genus of moths of the family Crambidae. It contains only one species, Exsilirarcha graminea, which is endemic to New Zealand. Both the genus and the species were described by John Salmon and J. D. Bradley in 1956.
