= List of crambid genera =

The large moth family Crambidae contains many genera.
