= Erupinae =

Scientific classification
- Domain: Eukaryota
- Kingdom: Animalia
- Phylum: Arthropoda
- Class: Insecta
- Order: Lepidoptera
- Family: Crambidae
- Subfamily: Erupinae; Munroe, 1995

Genera
- Erupa Walker, 1864; Lancia Walker, 1859; Schoenerupa Hampson, 1919

Subfamily of moths

Erupinae is a subfamily of the lepidopteran family Crambidae. It was described by Eugene G. Munroe in 1995.

Originally, Erupinae were described as a tribe in the subfamily Crambinae. Later, they were moved to Midilinae. A phylogenetic analysis of Crambidae moths found that Erupa does not form a monophyletic group with Midilinae, but is the sister group to either Crambinae or a monophylum of Heliothelinae and Scopariinae. Erupini were consequently removed from Midilinae and established as a separate subfamily.

The subfamily currently comprises three genera: Erupa Walker, 1864 with 36 species, Lancia Walker, 1859 with the single species L. phrontisalis Walker, 1859, and Schoenerupa Hampson, 1919 with the species S. thermantis Hampson, 1919.

Erupinae occur exclusively in the Neotropical realm. The foodplants of the caterpillars are unknown, but monocotyledons have been suggested.
