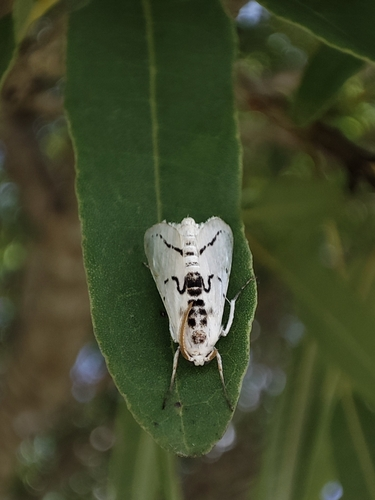
- Linosta sinceralis

Scientific classification
- Kingdom: Animalia
- Phylum: Arthropoda
- Class: Insecta
- Order: Lepidoptera
- Family: Crambidae
- Subfamily: Linostinae; Amsel, 1956
- Genus: Linosta; Möschler, 1882

= Linosta =

Genus of moths

Linosta is a genus of moths of the family Crambidae and only genus in the Linostinae subfamily.

== Species ==
- Linosta annulifera Munroe, 1959
- Linosta integrilinea Munroe, 1962
- Linosta sinceralis Möschler, 1882
