= Conotalis =

Scientific classification
- Domain: Eukaryota
- Kingdom: Animalia
- Phylum: Arthropoda
- Class: Insecta
- Order: Lepidoptera
- Superfamily: Pyraloidea
- Family: Crambidae
- Subfamily: incertae sedis
- Genus: Conotalis; Hampson, 1919

Genus of moths

Conotalis is a genus of moths of the family Crambidae.

== Species ==
Species:

- Conotalis aurantifascia (Hampson, 1896)
- Conotalis nigrisquamalis Hampson, 1919
- Conotalis nigroradians (Mabille, 1900)
