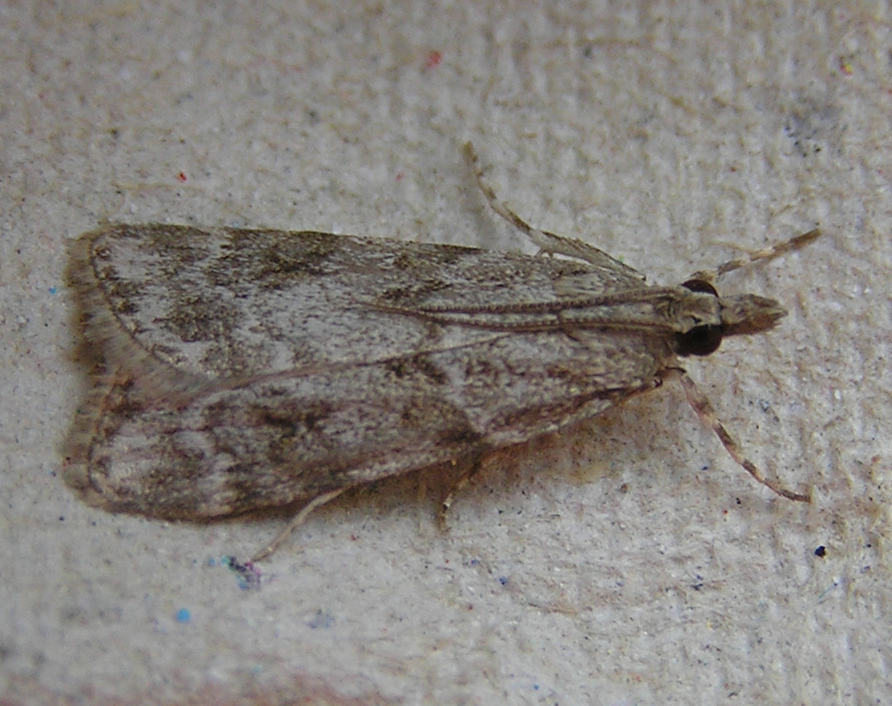

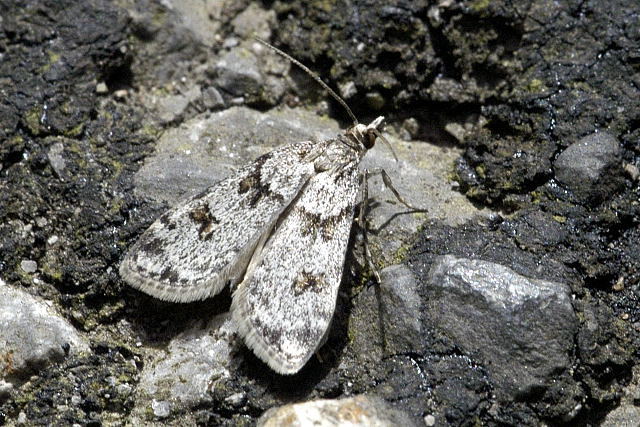

Scientific classification
- Kingdom: Animalia
- Phylum: Arthropoda
- Class: Insecta
- Order: Lepidoptera
- Family: Crambidae
- Genus: Scoparia
- Species: S. ambigualis

Binomial name
- Scoparia ambigualis (Treitschke, 1829)

Synonyms
- Hercyna ambigualis Treitschke, 1829; Eudorea asphodeliella La Harpe, 1855; Eudorea atomalis Stainton, 1855; Scoparia ambigualis nigra Hamfelt, 1917; Scoparia ambigualis ab. crossi E. R. Bankes, 1909; Scoparia ambigualis f. taeniatella Teich, 1889; Scoparia ambigualis f. whalleyi Leraut, 1984; Scoparia ambigualis var. aestiva A. Speyer, 1867; Scoparia erralis Guenée, 1854; Scoparia klinckowstroemi Hamfelt, 1917

= Scoparia ambigualis =

Species of moth

Scoparia ambigualis is a species of moth of the family Crambidae described by Friedrich Treitschke in 1829. It is found in Europe and Asia Minor and possibly in Guangdong and Shanxi in China.

The wingspan is 15–22 mm. The forewings are whitish, more or less sprinkled with grey and black; a black ochreous-mixed mark from base of costa; lines whitish, dark -edged, first irregular, second angulated above middle; orbicular elongate, brownish, more or less black-edged, resting on first line; claviform dot- like, black, seldom elongated to touch first line; discal spot 8-shaped, incompletely black edged, upper and sometimes lower half pale greyish-ochreous or brownish; terminal area dark, subterminal line cloudy, whitish; a terminal series of blackish marks. Hindwings are prismatic grey-whitish, terminally suffused with grey.

The moth flies from May to September depending on the location.

The larvae feed on valerian and probably also on various mosses.
