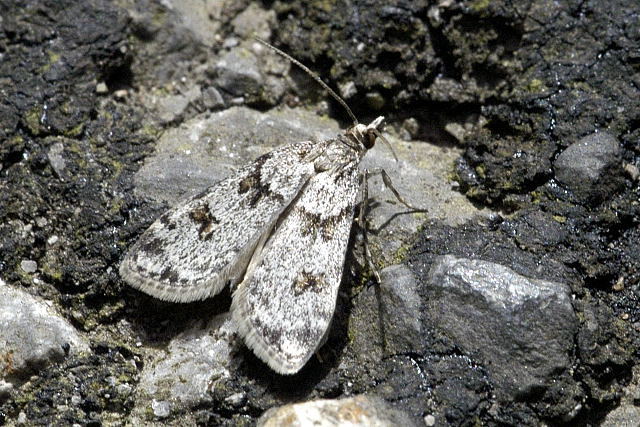
- Scoparia ambigualis

Scientific classification
- Kingdom: Animalia
- Phylum: Arthropoda
- Class: Insecta
- Order: Lepidoptera
- Superfamily: Pyraloidea
- Family: Crambidae; Latreille, 1810

Type species
- Phalaena pascuella Linnaeus, 1758

Subfamilies
- see text

Diversity
- Some 10,347 species

= Crambidae =

Family of moths

Crambidae comprises the grass moth family of lepidopterans. They are variable in appearance, with the nominal subfamily Crambinae (grass moths) taking up closely folded postures on grass stems where they are inconspicuous, while other subfamilies include brightly coloured and patterned insects that rest in wing-spread attitudes.

In many classifications, the Crambidae have been treated as a subfamily of the Pyralidae or snout moths. The principal difference is a structure in the tympanal organs called the praecinctorium, which joins two tympanic membranes in the Crambidae, and is absent from the Pyralidae. The latest review by Munroe and Solis, in Kristensen (1999), retains the Crambidae as a full family. The family currently comprises 15 subfamilies with altogether 10,347 species in over 1,000 genera.

== Systematics ==
Cladogram of Crambidae subfamilies

- Pyraloidea
  - - Pyralidae (sister group)
  - Crambidae
    - - Pyraustinae
      - Spilomelinae
    - - - Odontiinae
        - - Linostinae
          - Glaphyriinae
      - - - Lathrotelinae
          - Musotiminae
        - - - Midilinae
            - - Schoenobiinae
              - Acentropinae
          - - Hoploscopinae
            - - - Erupinae
                - - Heliothelinae
                  - Scopariinae
              - Crambinae

Crambidae phylogeny after Regier et al. (2012) and Léger et al. (2021)

- Subfamilia incertae sedis
  - Conotalis Hampson, 1919
  - Exsilirarcha Salmon & Bradley, 1956
- Subfamily Acentropinae Stephens, 1836
- Subfamily Crambinae Latreille, 1810
- Subfamily Erupinae Munroe, 1995
- Subfamily Glaphyriinae Forbes, 1923 (= Evergestinae Marion, 1952, Noordinae Minet, 1980, Cybalomiinae Marion, 1955, Cathariinae Minet, 1982)
- Subfamily Heliothelinae Amsel, 1961
- Subfamily Hoploscopinae Robinson et al., 1994
- Subfamily Lathrotelinae Clarke, 1971
- Subfamily Linostinae Amsel, 1956
- Subfamily Midilinae Munroe, 1958
- Subfamily Musotiminae Meyrick, 1884
- Subfamily Odontiinae Guenée, 1854
- Subfamily Pyraustinae Meyrick, 1890
- Subfamily Schoenobiinae Duponchel, 1846
- Subfamily Scopariinae Guenée, 1854
- Subfamily Spilomelinae Guenée, 1854 (= Wurthiinae Roepke, 1916)

== Relationship with humans ==
Since crambids are relatively common throughout human settlements, the moths tend to affect crops and gardens, whether harmfully, beneficially or harmlessly. Beneficial crambids include the water hyacinth moth (Niphograpta albiguttalis), used to control its host (Eichhornia crassipes), the water veneer (Acentria ephemerella), a biocontrol agent used against Eurasian watermilfoil, and the bamboo borer (Omphisa fuscidentalis), of which the caterpillars are used for human consumption. The mint moth (Pyrausta aurata) is an example of a harmless crambid.

Crambid larvae are typically stem borers in plants of the grass family. As this family contains many important crops, some Crambidae species achieve pest status. The European corn borer Ostrinia nubilalis is perhaps the best known; introduced to the United States in the early 1900s, it is now widespread in all but the westernmost states. Other pest species include the pearl millet stem borer (Coniesta ignefusalis), the spotted stalk borer (Chilo partellus), the Asiatic rice borer (Chilo suppressalis), sod webworms (Crambus spp.), Duponchelia fovealis, the sugarcane borer (Diatraea saccharalis), bean pod borers (Maruca spp.), the rice white stemborer (Scirpophaga innotata), the southwestern corn borer (Diatraea grandiosella), and the grape leaffolder (Desmia maculalis).

== Gallery ==
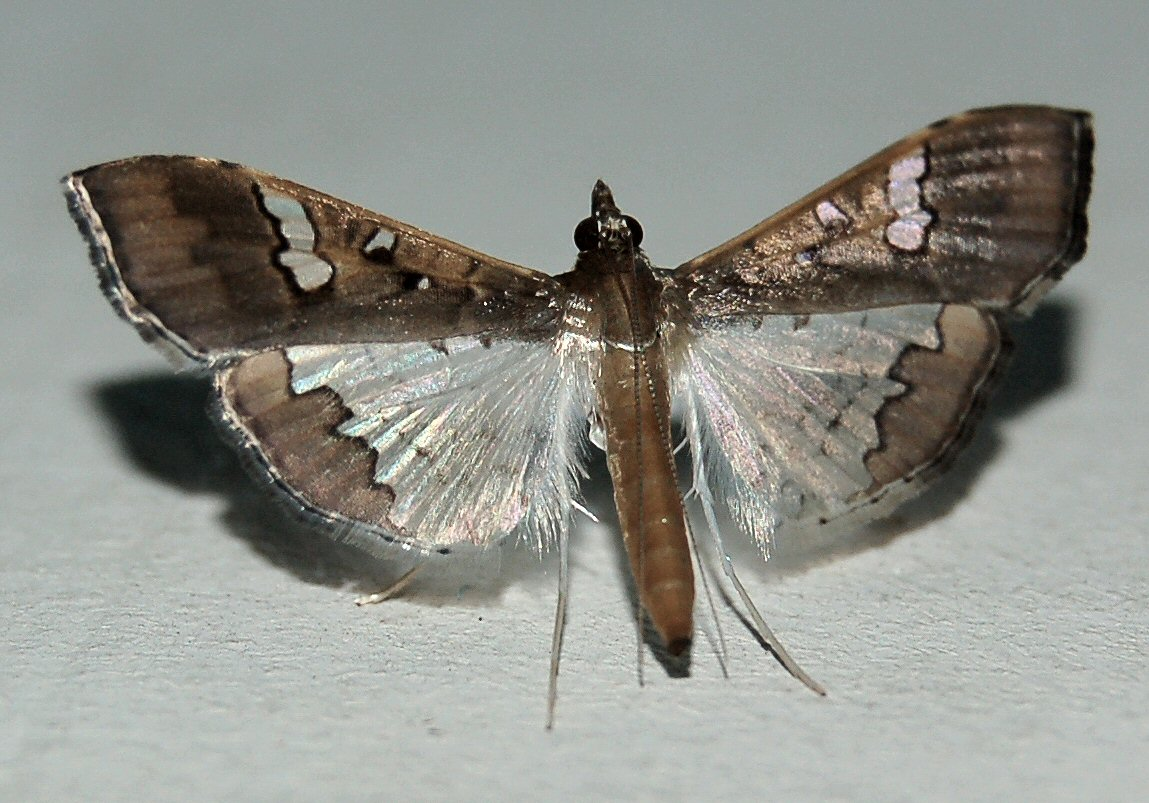
Maruca vitrata

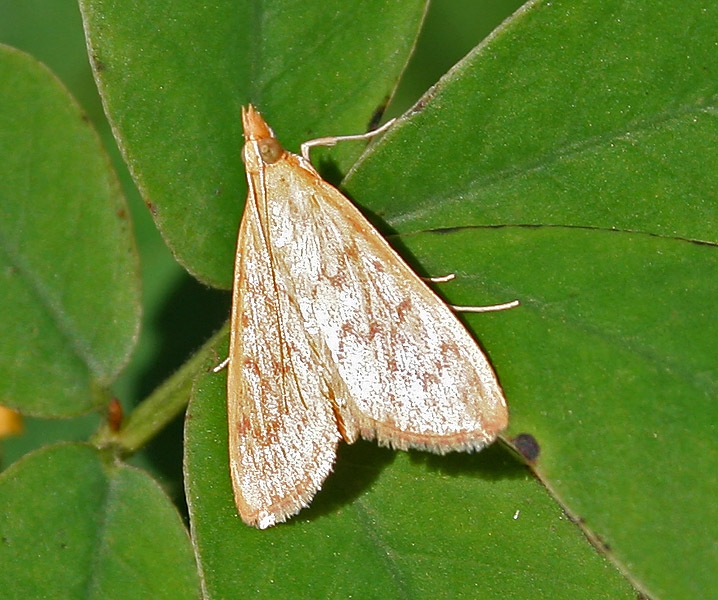
Spilomelinae species

Agriphila straminella on Achillea

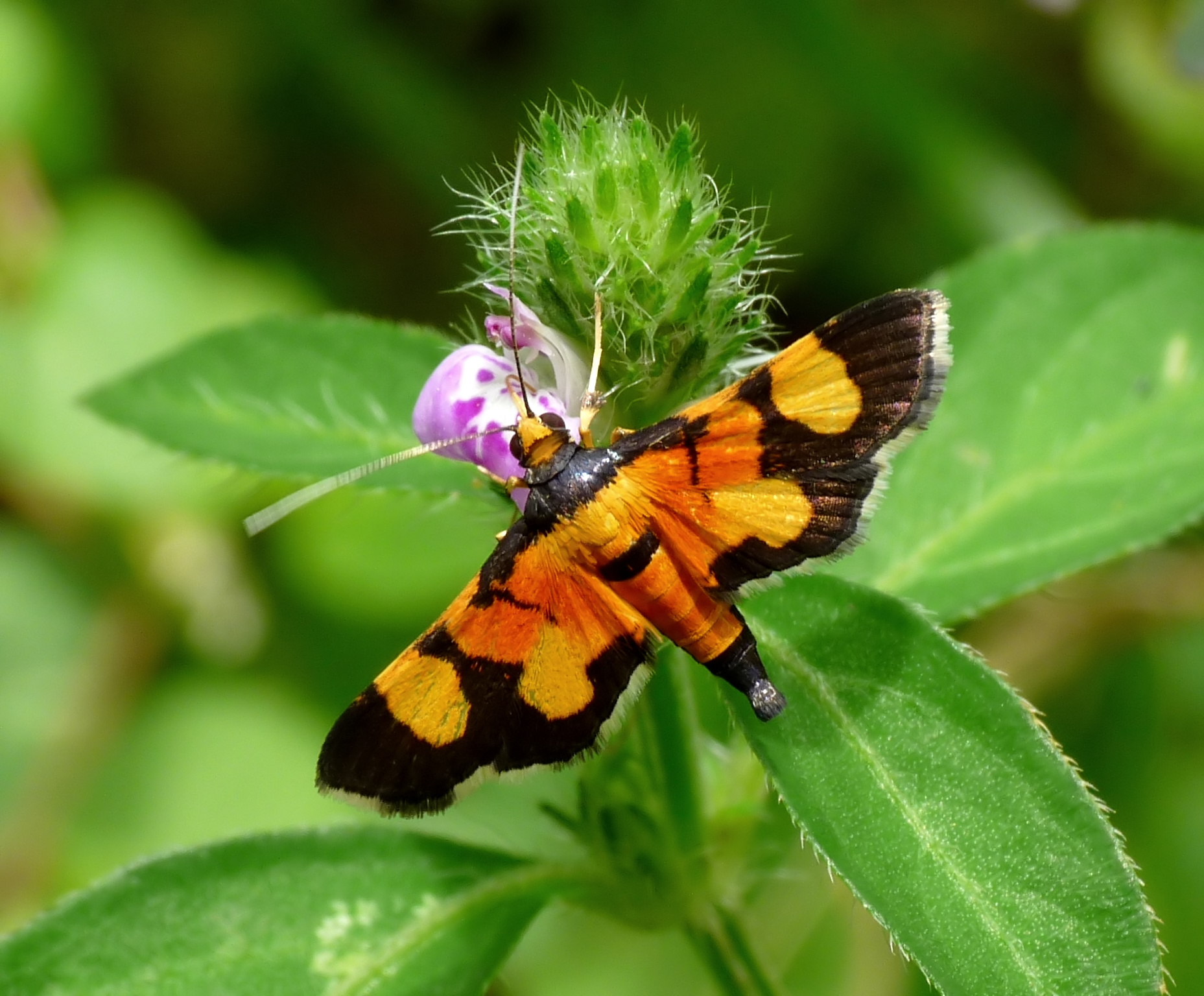
Aethaloessa calidalis

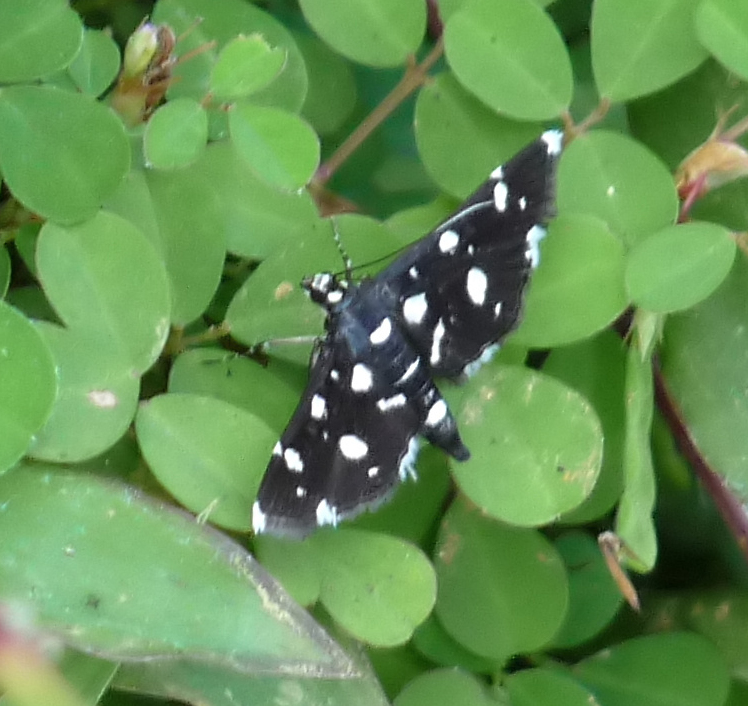
Bocchoris inspersalis on Desmodium triflorum

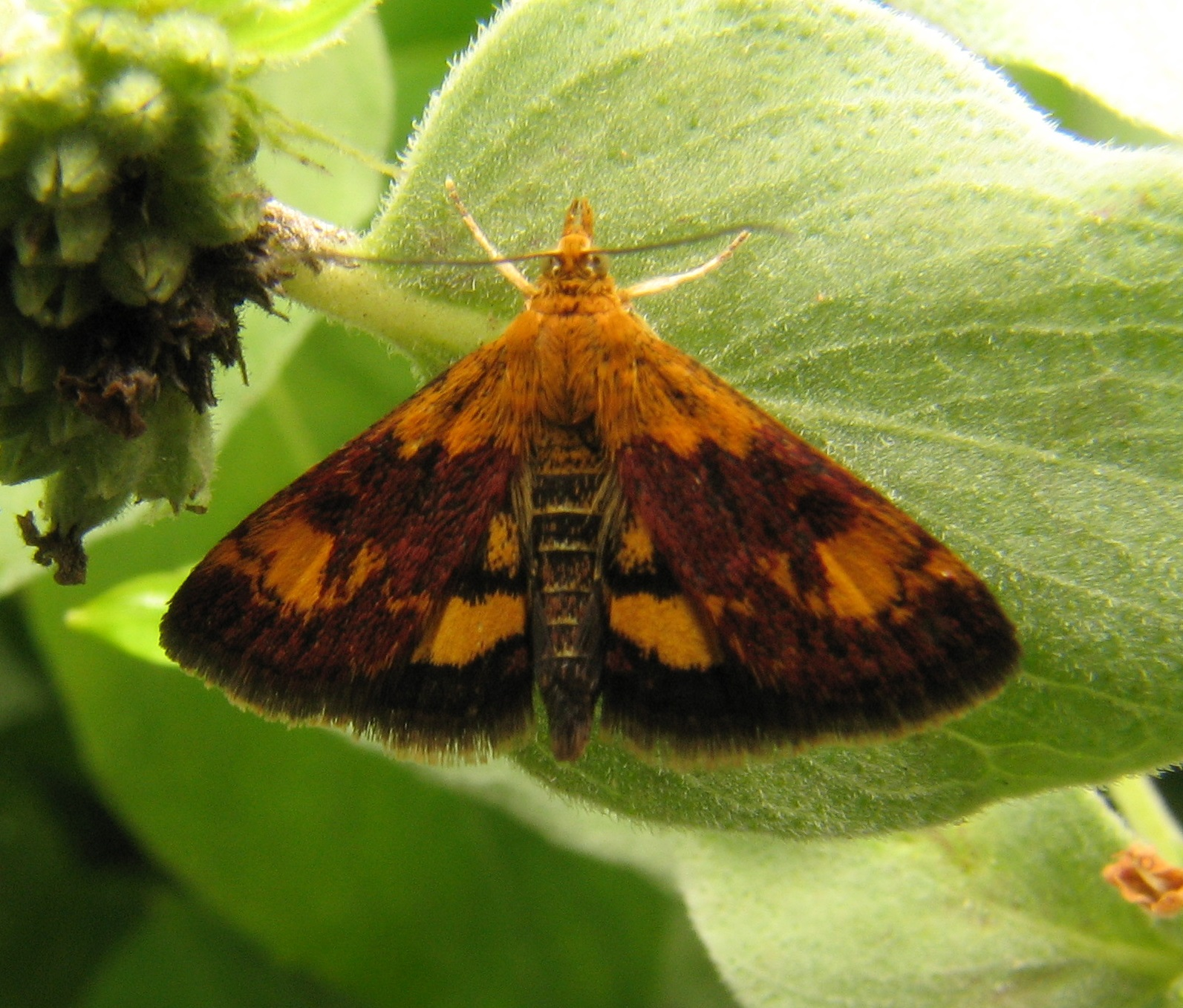
Pyrausta orphisalis

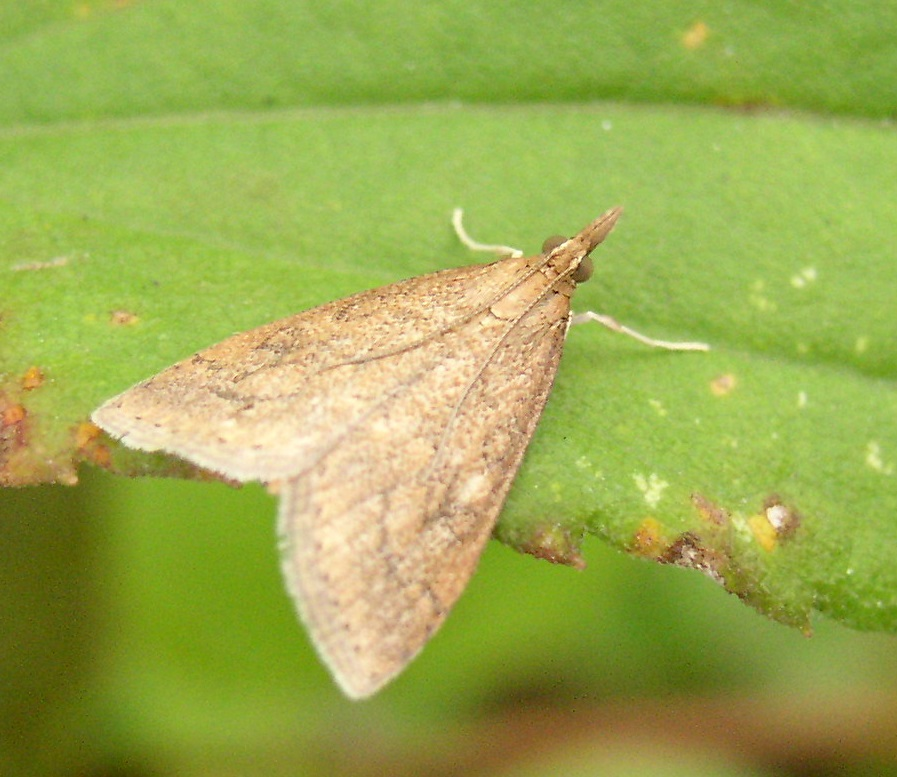
Udea rubigalis

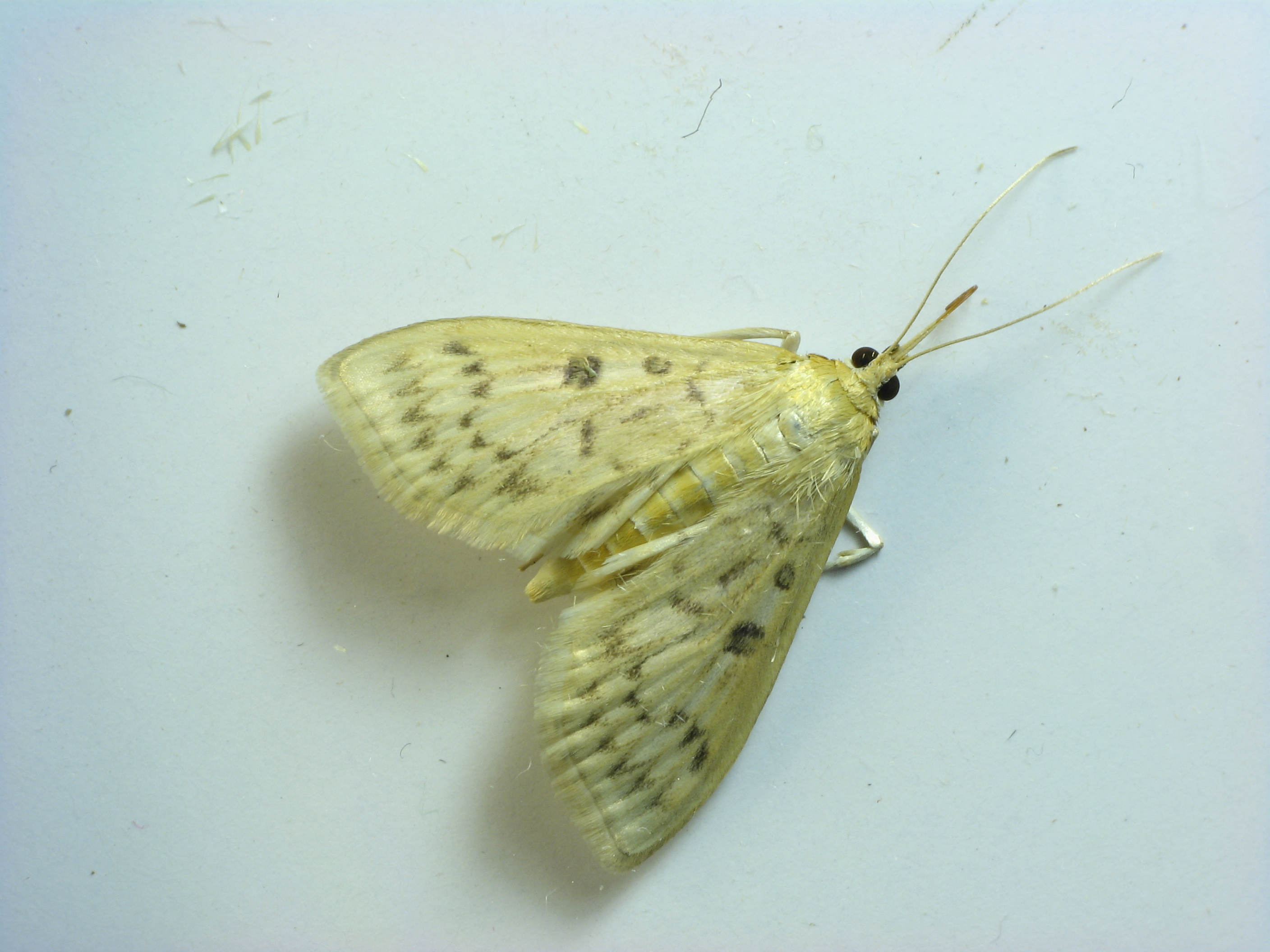
Herpetogramma sp.

== See also ==
- List of crambid genera
