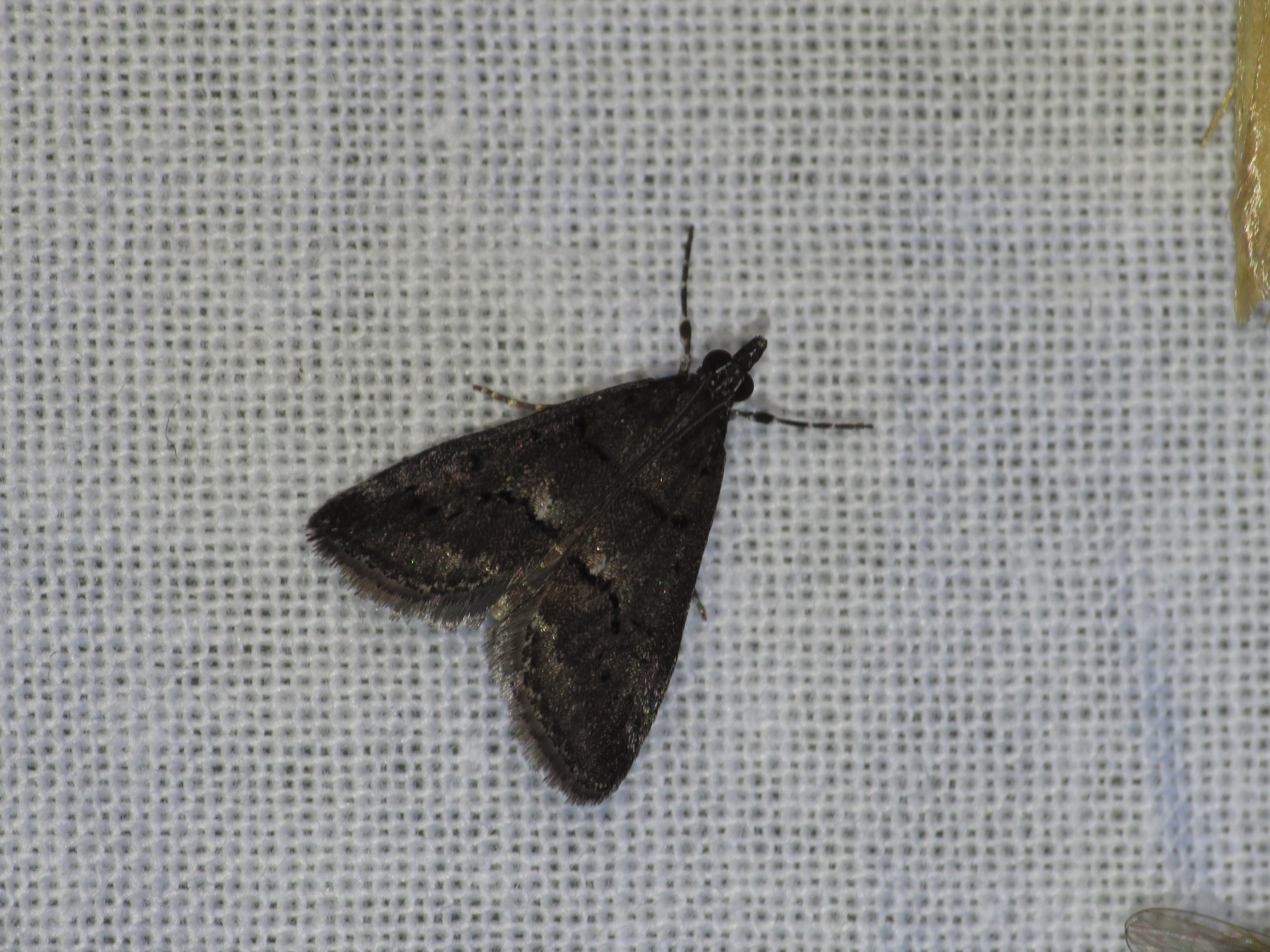
- Eclipsiodes crypsixantha

Scientific classification
- Domain: Eukaryota
- Kingdom: Animalia
- Phylum: Arthropoda
- Class: Insecta
- Order: Lepidoptera
- Family: Crambidae
- Subfamily: Heliothelinae
- Genus: Eclipsiodes; Meyrick, 1884

= Eclipsiodes =

Genus of moths

Eclipsiodes is a genus of moths of the family Crambidae.

== Species ==
- Eclipsiodes anthomera (Lower, 1896)
- Eclipsiodes crypsixantha Meyrick, 1884
- Eclipsiodes homora Turner, 1908

== Former species ==
- Eclipsiodes orthogramma (Lower, 1902)
- Eclipsiodes schizodesma (Lower, 1899)
- Eclipsiodes semigilva Turner, 1922
