= Hoploscopa metacrossa =

Scientific classification
- Kingdom: Animalia
- Phylum: Arthropoda
- Class: Insecta
- Order: Lepidoptera
- Family: Crambidae
- Subfamily: Hoploscopinae
- Genus: Hoploscopa
- Species: H. metacrossa

Binomial name
- Hoploscopa metacrossa (Hampson, 1917)

Synonyms
- Scoparia metacrossa Hampson, 1917

Species of moth

Hoploscopa metacrossa is a moth in the family Crambidae. It was described by George Hampson in 1917. It is found on New Guinea.
