= Hoploscopa mediobrunnea =

Scientific classification
- Domain: Eukaryota
- Kingdom: Animalia
- Phylum: Arthropoda
- Class: Insecta
- Order: Lepidoptera
- Family: Crambidae
- Subfamily: Hoploscopinae
- Genus: Hoploscopa
- Species: H. mediobrunnea

Binomial name
- Hoploscopa mediobrunnea (de Joannis, 1929)

Synonyms
- Eudorina mediobrunnea de Joannis, 1929

Species of moth

Hoploscopa mediobrunnea is a moth in the family Crambidae. It is found in Vietnam.
