= Hoploscopa diffusa =

Scientific classification
- Kingdom: Animalia
- Phylum: Arthropoda
- Class: Insecta
- Order: Lepidoptera
- Family: Crambidae
- Subfamily: Hoploscopinae
- Genus: Hoploscopa
- Species: H. diffusa

Binomial name
- Hoploscopa diffusa (Hampson, 1919)

Synonyms
- Eudorina diffusa Hampson, 1919

Species of moth

Hoploscopa diffusa is a moth in the family Crambidae, first described by George Hampson in 1919. It is found in New Guinea, where it has been recorded from the D'Entrecasteaux Islands.
