= Hoploscopa aurantiacalis =

Scientific classification
- Kingdom: Animalia
- Phylum: Arthropoda
- Class: Insecta
- Order: Lepidoptera
- Family: Crambidae
- Subfamily: Hoploscopinae
- Genus: Hoploscopa
- Species: H. aurantiacalis

Binomial name
- Hoploscopa aurantiacalis (Snellen, 1895)

Synonyms
- Eudorina aurantiacalis Snellen, 1895

Species of moth

Hoploscopa aurantiacalis is a moth in the family Crambidae. It is found on Java.
