= Hoploscopa astrapias =

Scientific classification
- Kingdom: Animalia
- Phylum: Arthropoda
- Class: Insecta
- Order: Lepidoptera
- Family: Crambidae
- Subfamily: Hoploscopinae
- Genus: Hoploscopa
- Species: H. astrapias

Binomial name
- Hoploscopa astrapias Meyrick, 1886

Species of moth

Hoploscopa astrapias is a species of Crambid Snout Moth in the family Crambidae. It is found on Fiji.
