= Hoploscopa obliqua =

Scientific classification
- Domain: Eukaryota
- Kingdom: Animalia
- Phylum: Arthropoda
- Class: Insecta
- Order: Lepidoptera
- Family: Crambidae
- Subfamily: Hoploscopinae
- Genus: Hoploscopa
- Species: H. obliqua

Binomial name
- Hoploscopa obliqua (Rothschild, 1915)

Synonyms
- Eudorina obliqua Rothschild, 1915

Species of moth

Hoploscopa obliqua is a moth in the family Crambidae. It was described by Rothschild in 1915. It is found in New Guinea.
