= Hoploscopa anamesa =

Scientific classification
- Domain: Eukaryota
- Kingdom: Animalia
- Phylum: Arthropoda
- Class: Insecta
- Order: Lepidoptera
- Family: Crambidae
- Subfamily: Hoploscopinae
- Genus: Hoploscopa
- Species: H. anamesa

Binomial name
- Hoploscopa anamesa Tams, 1935

Synonyms
- Hoploscopa astrapias anamesa Tams, 1935

Species of moth

Hoploscopa anamesa is a moth in the family Crambidae. It is found on the New Hebrides and Fiji.
