= Hoploscopa ocellata =

Scientific classification
- Kingdom: Animalia
- Phylum: Arthropoda
- Class: Insecta
- Order: Lepidoptera
- Family: Crambidae
- Subfamily: Hoploscopinae
- Genus: Hoploscopa
- Species: H. ocellata

Binomial name
- Hoploscopa ocellata (Hampson, 1919)

Synonyms
- Eudorina ocellata Hampson, 1919

Species of moth

Hoploscopa ocellata is a moth in the family Crambidae. It was described by George Hampson in 1919. It is found on the Moluccas in Indonesia.
