= Hoploscopa nauticorum =

Scientific classification
- Domain: Eukaryota
- Kingdom: Animalia
- Phylum: Arthropoda
- Class: Insecta
- Order: Lepidoptera
- Family: Crambidae
- Subfamily: Hoploscopinae
- Genus: Hoploscopa
- Species: H. nauticorum

Binomial name
- Hoploscopa nauticorum Tams, 1935

Species of moth

Hoploscopa nauticorum is a moth in the family Crambidae. It is found on Samoa.
