= Hoploscopa brunnealis =

Scientific classification
- Kingdom: Animalia
- Phylum: Arthropoda
- Class: Insecta
- Order: Lepidoptera
- Family: Crambidae
- Subfamily: Hoploscopinae
- Genus: Hoploscopa
- Species: H. brunnealis

Binomial name
- Hoploscopa brunnealis (Snellen, 1895)

Synonyms
- Eudorina brunnealis Snellen, 1895; Argyria xiphotoma Meyrick, 1938

Species of moth

Hoploscopa brunnealis is a moth in the family Crambidae. It is found on Java.
