= Hoploscopa semifascia =

Scientific classification
- Kingdom: Animalia
- Phylum: Arthropoda
- Class: Insecta
- Order: Lepidoptera
- Family: Crambidae
- Subfamily: Hoploscopinae
- Genus: Hoploscopa
- Species: H. semifascia

Binomial name
- Hoploscopa semifascia (Hampson, 1919)

Synonyms
- Eudorina semifascia Hampson, 1919

Species of moth

Hoploscopa semifascia is a moth in the family Crambidae. It was described by George Hampson in 1919. It is found in New Guinea.
