= Hoploscopa luteomacula =

Scientific classification
- Kingdom: Animalia
- Phylum: Arthropoda
- Clade: Pancrustacea
- Class: Insecta
- Order: Lepidoptera
- Family: Crambidae
- Subfamily: Hoploscopinae
- Genus: Hoploscopa
- Species: H. luteomacula

Binomial name
- Hoploscopa luteomacula Nuss, 1998

Species of moth

Hoploscopa luteomacula is a moth in the family Crambidae. It is found on Sumatra.
