= Heliothela oreias =

Scientific classification
- Domain: Eukaryota
- Kingdom: Animalia
- Phylum: Arthropoda
- Class: Insecta
- Order: Lepidoptera
- Family: Crambidae
- Genus: Heliothela
- Species: H. oreias

Binomial name
- Heliothela oreias Turner, 1915

Species of moth

Heliothela oreias is a moth of the family Crambidae. It was described by Turner in 1915. It is found in Australia, where it has been recorded from Victoria.
