= Heliothela aterrima =

Scientific classification
- Domain: Eukaryota
- Kingdom: Animalia
- Phylum: Arthropoda
- Class: Insecta
- Order: Lepidoptera
- Family: Crambidae
- Genus: Heliothela
- Species: H. aterrima

Binomial name
- Heliothela aterrima Turner, 1937

Species of moth

Heliothela aterrima is a moth of the family Crambidae. It was described by Turner in 1937. It is found in Australia, where it has been recorded from New South Wales.
