= Phanomorpha striatalis =

Scientific classification
- Kingdom: Animalia
- Phylum: Arthropoda
- Class: Insecta
- Order: Lepidoptera
- Family: Crambidae
- Genus: Phanomorpha
- Species: P. striatalis

Binomial name
- Phanomorpha striatalis (Hampson, 1907)

Synonyms
- Eclipsiodes striatalis Hampson, 1907

Species of moth

Phanomorpha striatalis is a moth in the family Crambidae. It was described by George Hampson in 1907. It is found in Australia, where it has been recorded from Western Australia.
