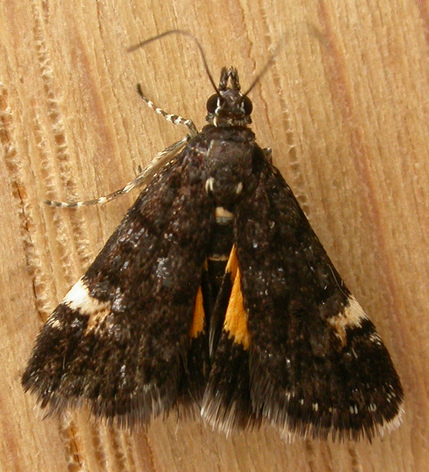
- H. ophideresana

Scientific classification
- Domain: Eukaryota
- Kingdom: Animalia
- Phylum: Arthropoda
- Class: Insecta
- Order: Lepidoptera
- Family: Crambidae
- Subfamily: Heliothelinae
- Genus: Heliothela; Guenée, 1854

Synonyms
- Nyctarcha Meyrick, 1884; Orosana Walker, 1863

= Heliothela =

Genus of moths

Heliothela is a genus of moths of the family Crambidae.

== Species ==
- Heliothela aterrima Turner, 1937
- Heliothela atra (Butler, 1877)
- Heliothela didymospila Turner, 1915
- Heliothela floricola Turner, 1913
- Heliothela nigralbata Leech, 1889
- Heliothela ophideresana (Walker, 1863)
- Heliothela oreias Turner, 1915
- Heliothela paracentra (Meyrick, 1887)
- Heliothela wulfeniana (Scopoli, 1763)

== Former species ==
- Heliothela cretostrigalis Caradja, 1925
