= Perimeceta niphotypa =

Scientific classification
- Kingdom: Animalia
- Phylum: Arthropoda
- Class: Insecta
- Order: Lepidoptera
- Family: Crambidae
- Genus: Perimeceta
- Species: P. niphotypa

Binomial name
- Perimeceta niphotypa Turner, 1915

Species of moth

Perimeceta niphotypa is a moth in the family Crambidae. It was described by Turner in 1915. It is found in Australia, where it has been recorded from New South Wales.
