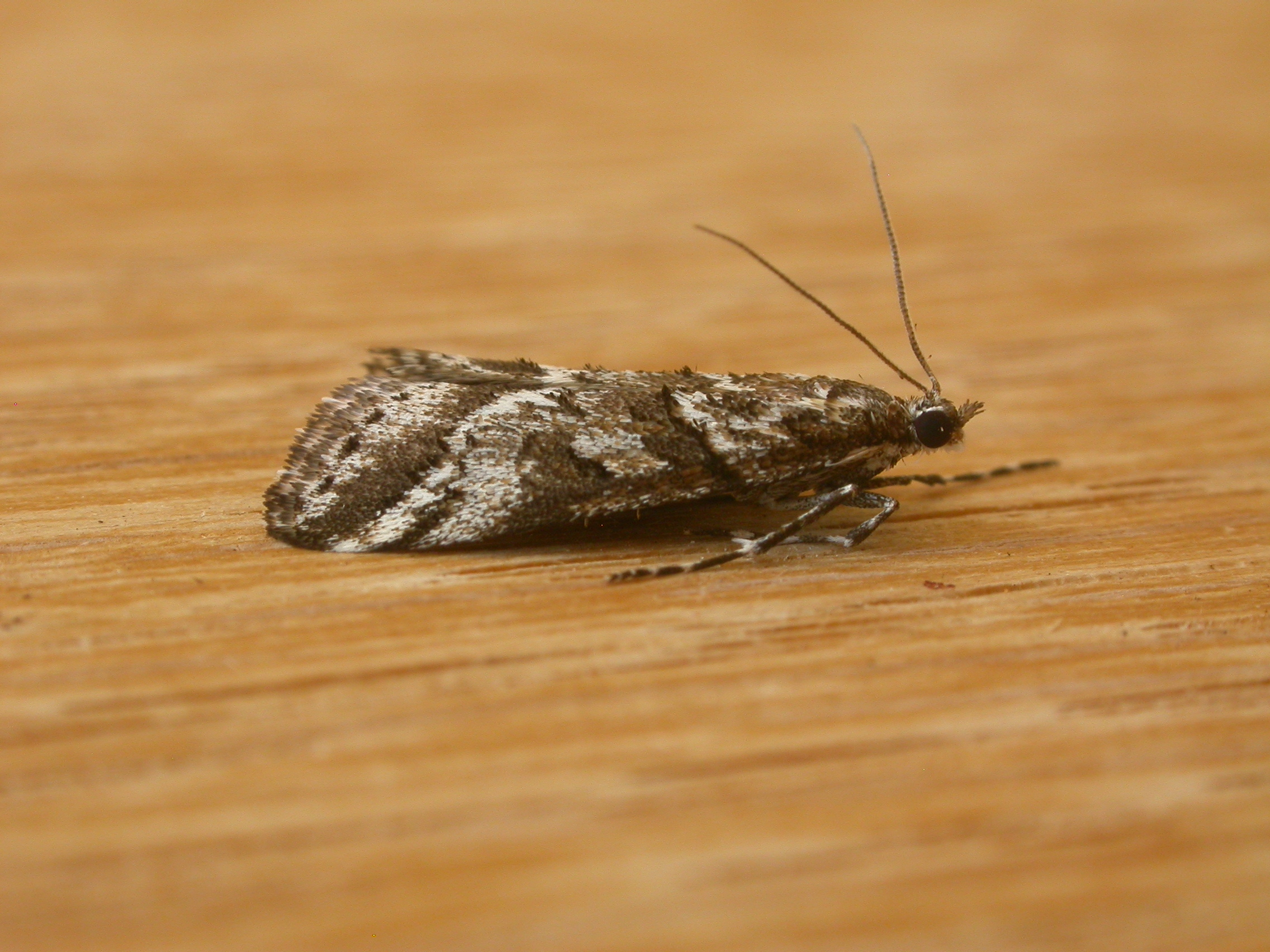

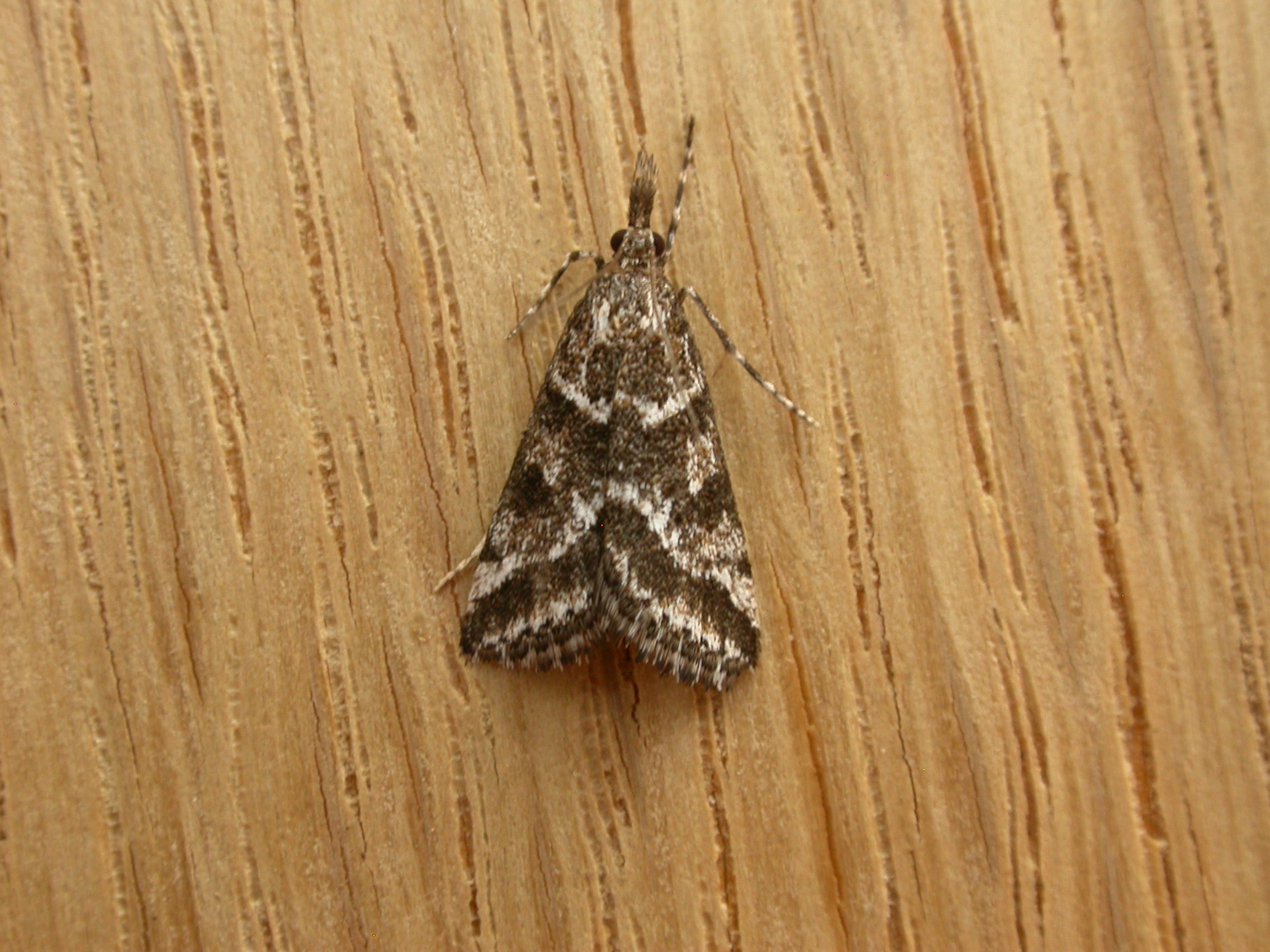

Scientific classification
- Domain: Eukaryota
- Kingdom: Animalia
- Phylum: Arthropoda
- Class: Insecta
- Order: Lepidoptera
- Family: Crambidae
- Genus: Phanomorpha
- Species: P. dapsilis

Binomial name
- Phanomorpha dapsilis (Turner, 1908)

Synonyms
- Eclipsiodes dapsilis Turner, 1908

= Phanomorpha dapsilis =

Species of moth

Phanomorpha dapsilis is a moth of the family Crambidae described by Alfred Jefferis Turner in 1908. It is known from Australia, including the Australian Capital Territory.
