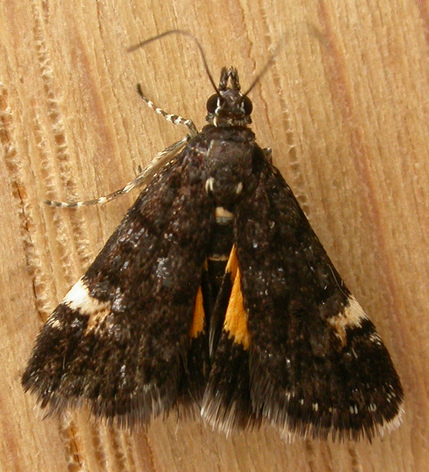

Scientific classification
- Kingdom: Animalia
- Phylum: Arthropoda
- Class: Insecta
- Order: Lepidoptera
- Family: Crambidae
- Genus: Heliothela
- Species: H. ophideresana

Binomial name
- Heliothela ophideresana (Walker, 1863)

Synonyms
- Orosana ophideresana Walker, 1863; Heliothela kruegeri Turati, 1926; Heliothela pusilla Butler, 1889; Heliothela ophideres

= Heliothela ophideresana =

Species of moth

Heliothela ophideresana is a species of moth of the family Crambidae. It is widespread species, found in South Africa, Libya, Malawi, Namibia, Nigeria, Madagascar, Tanzania, Saudi Arabia, Yemen, Oman, United Arab Emirates, India, India, Sri Lanka, Afghanistan and in Australia, where it has been caught in Queensland. The wingspan is about 15 millimetres (0.59 in).
