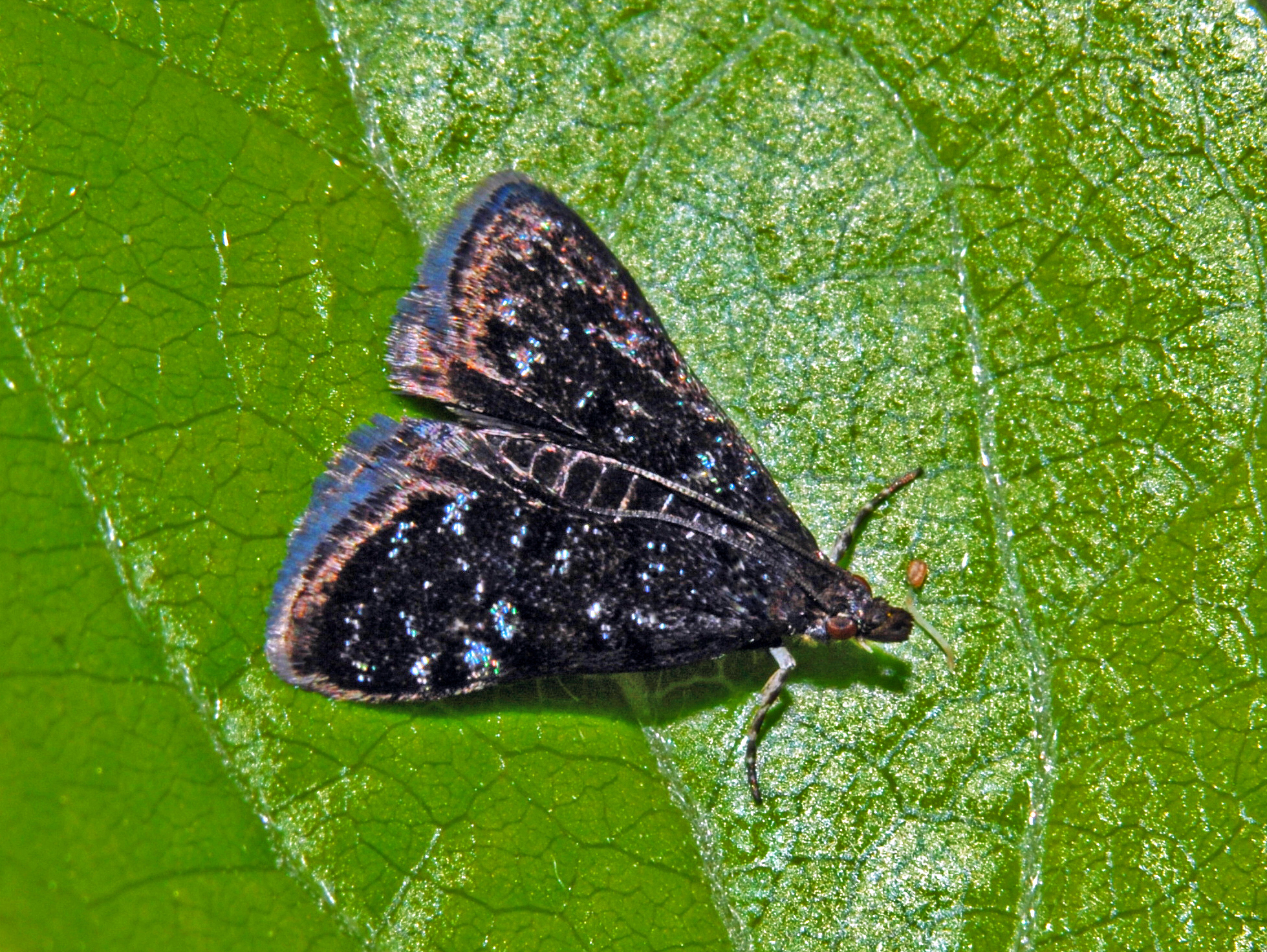
- Dorsal view

Scientific classification
- Kingdom: Animalia
- Phylum: Arthropoda
- Class: Insecta
- Order: Lepidoptera
- Family: Crambidae
- Genus: Heliothela
- Species: H. wulfeniana

Binomial name
- Heliothela wulfeniana (Scopoli, 1763)

Synonyms
- Phalaena wulfeniana Scopoli, 1763; Phalaena Pyralis atralis Hübner, 1788 (nec Fabricius 1775); Heliothela atralis ab. albocilialis Rebel, 1941; Heliothela coerulealis Caradja, 1916; Heliothela huebneri Koçak, 1980; Heliothela praegalliensis Frey, 1880; Pyralis helwigiana Fabricius, 1794; Pyralis undulalis Schrank, 1802

= Heliothela wulfeniana =

Species of moth

Heliothela wulfeniana is a species of moth in the family Crambidae first described by Giovanni Antonio Scopoli in 1763.

== Distribution and habitat ==
Heliothela wulfeniana can be found in most of Europe, except Ireland, Great Britain, Norway and Portugal. The range of this species extends from France and Spain in the west to Central Europe and the Mediterranean to the European part of Russia. Outside of Europe, it can also be found in the Caucasus and the Altai, as well as in Turkey and Central Asia.

== Habitat ==
These moths inhabit xerophilic sandy environments with sparse vegetation.

== Description ==
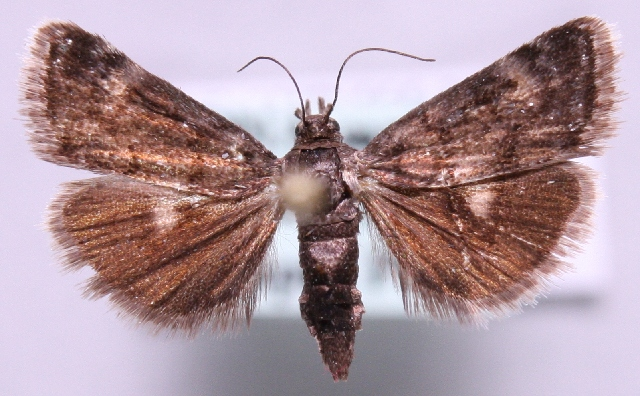
Mounted specimen

Heliothela wulfeniana has a wingspan of 16–19 mm. The thorax and abdomen of these moths are brownish. Legs are whitish. The upperside of the forewings is dark brownish black, with small metallic lead-gray dots. A showy white spot is present on the paler brown hindwings. The outer margins of the wings are fringed with gray-bluish scales.

== Biology ==
Adults of these diurnal moths fly from May to June and in mid-August. They feed on pollen and nectar of flowers of various plants, mainly of bindweed (Convolvulus ), yarrow (Achillea) and thyme (Thymus). The females lay the eggs on the leaves of the host plants. The caterpillars hatch after five to six days. The adult caterpillars live in the hollow stems of the plant. These larvae feed on mints (Mentha) and Viola species, including Viola curtisii, Viola tricolor and Viola arvensis. They pupate in the soil near the host plant.
