= Phanomorpha pammicta =

Scientific classification
- Domain: Eukaryota
- Kingdom: Animalia
- Phylum: Arthropoda
- Class: Insecta
- Order: Lepidoptera
- Family: Crambidae
- Genus: Phanomorpha
- Species: P. pammicta

Binomial name
- Phanomorpha pammicta (Turner, 1908)

Synonyms
- Eclipsiodes pammicta Turner, 1908

Species of moth

Phanomorpha pammicta is a moth in the family Crambidae. It was described by Turner in 1908. It is found in Australia, where it has been recorded from Queensland.
