= Phanomorpha persumptana =

Scientific classification
- Kingdom: Animalia
- Phylum: Arthropoda
- Class: Insecta
- Order: Lepidoptera
- Family: Crambidae
- Genus: Phanomorpha
- Species: P. persumptana

Binomial name
- Phanomorpha persumptana (Walker, 1863)

Synonyms
- Orosana persumptana Walker, 1863

Species of moth

Phanomorpha persumptana is a moth in the family Crambidae. It was described by Francis Walker in 1863. It is found in Australia, where it has been recorded from both the mainland and Tasmania.
