= Eclipsiodes anthomera =

Scientific classification
- Domain: Eukaryota
- Kingdom: Animalia
- Phylum: Arthropoda
- Class: Insecta
- Order: Lepidoptera
- Family: Crambidae
- Genus: Eclipsiodes
- Species: E. anthomera

Binomial name
- Eclipsiodes anthomera (Lower, 1896)

Synonyms
- Scoparia anthomera Lower, 1896

Species of moth

Eclipsiodes anthomera is a moth in the family Crambidae. It was described by Oswald Bertram Lower in 1896. It is found in Australia, where it has been recorded from South Australia.
