= Phanomorpha anisophragma =

Scientific classification
- Domain: Eukaryota
- Kingdom: Animalia
- Phylum: Arthropoda
- Class: Insecta
- Order: Lepidoptera
- Family: Crambidae
- Genus: Phanomorpha
- Species: P. anisophragma

Binomial name
- Phanomorpha anisophragma (Lower, 1901)

Synonyms
- Scoparia anisophragma Lower, 1901

Species of moth

Phanomorpha anisophragma is a moth in the family Crambidae. It was described by Oswald Bertram Lower in 1901. It is found in Australia, where it has been recorded from New South Wales.
