= Phanomorpha drosera =

Scientific classification
- Kingdom: Animalia
- Phylum: Arthropoda
- Class: Insecta
- Order: Lepidoptera
- Family: Crambidae
- Genus: Phanomorpha
- Species: P. drosera

Binomial name
- Phanomorpha drosera (Meyrick, 1887)

Synonyms
- Eclipsiodes drosera Meyrick, 1887

Species of moth

Phanomorpha drosera is a moth in the family Crambidae. It was described by Edward Meyrick in 1887. It is found in Australia, where it has been recorded from Victoria.
