= Heliothela paracentra =

Scientific classification
- Kingdom: Animalia
- Phylum: Arthropoda
- Class: Insecta
- Order: Lepidoptera
- Family: Crambidae
- Genus: Heliothela
- Species: H. paracentra

Binomial name
- Heliothela paracentra (Meyrick, 1887)

Synonyms
- Nyctarcha paracentra Meyrick, 1887

Species of moth

Heliothela paracentra is a moth of the family Crambidae. It was described by Edward Meyrick in 1887. It is found in Australia, where it has been recorded from Western Australia.
