= Perimeceta incrustalis =

Scientific classification
- Kingdom: Animalia
- Phylum: Arthropoda
- Class: Insecta
- Order: Lepidoptera
- Family: Crambidae
- Genus: Perimeceta
- Species: P. incrustalis

Binomial name
- Perimeceta incrustalis (Snellen, 1895)

Synonyms
- Eudorina incrustalis Snellen, 1895; Phanerobela niphospila Turner, 1932

Species of moth

Perimeceta incrustalis is a moth in the family Crambidae. It was described by Snellen in 1895. It is found on Java and in Australia, where it has been recorded from northern Queensland.

There is a dark brown pattern with white marks on the forewings. The hindwings are uniform pale brown.
