= Perimeceta leucosticta =

Scientific classification
- Kingdom: Animalia
- Phylum: Arthropoda
- Class: Insecta
- Order: Lepidoptera
- Family: Crambidae
- Genus: Perimeceta
- Species: P. leucosticta

Binomial name
- Perimeceta leucosticta (Hampson, 1919)

Synonyms
- Eudorina leucosticta Hampson, 1919

Species of moth

Perimeceta leucosticta is a moth in the family Crambidae. It was described by George Hampson in 1919. It is found on New Guinea, where it has been recorded from Fergusson Island.
