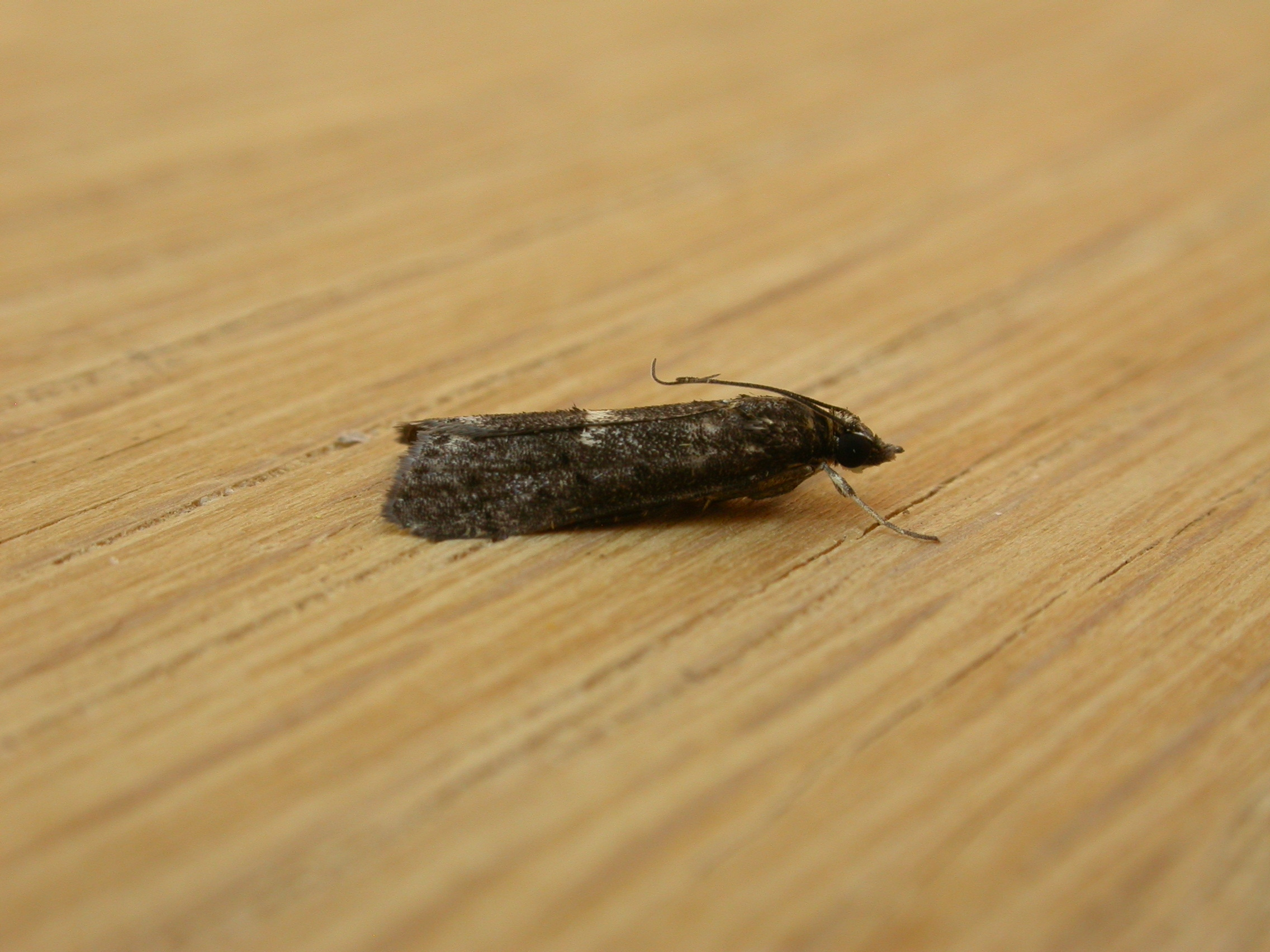
- Eclipsiodes homora Turner, 1908, to MV light, Aranda, ACT, 2008

Scientific classification
- Kingdom: Animalia
- Phylum: Arthropoda
- Class: Insecta
- Order: Lepidoptera
- Family: Crambidae
- Genus: Eclipsiodes
- Species: E. homora

Binomial name
- Eclipsiodes homora Turner, 1908

= Eclipsiodes homora =

Species of moth

Eclipsiodes homora is a moth in the family Crambidae. It was described by Turner in 1908. It is found in Australia, where it has been recorded from the Northern Territory, Queensland, New South Wales and the Australian Capital Territory.
