= Hoploscopa =

Scientific classification
- Kingdom: Animalia
- Phylum: Arthropoda
- Clade: Pancrustacea
- Class: Insecta
- Order: Lepidoptera
- Family: Crambidae
- Subfamily: Hoploscopinae
- Genus: Hoploscopa; Meyrick, 1886

Synonyms
- Haploscopa Hampson, 1897 (misspelling); Syncrotaula Meyrick, 1933; Eudorina Snellen, 1895

Genus of moths

Hoploscopa is a genus of snout moths in the subfamily Hoploscopinae of the family Crambidae. The genus was described by Edward Meyrick in 1886, with Hoploscopa astrapias as type species.

A recent taxonomic study using morphology and DNA data described an additional 26 species, so that the genus currently comprises 42 species. At least 30 more species await scientific description.

The caterpillars are reported to feed on ferns.

== Species ==
- Hoploscopa agtuuganonensis Léger & Nuss in Léger, Kehlmaier, Vairappan & Nuss, 2020
- Hoploscopa albipuncta Léger & Nuss in Léger, Kehlmaier, Vairappan & Nuss, 2020
- Hoploscopa albomaculata Léger & Nuss in Léger, Kehlmaier, Vairappan & Nuss, 2020
- Hoploscopa anacantha Léger & Nuss in Léger, Kehlmaier, Vairappan & Nuss, 2020
- Hoploscopa anamesa Tams, 1935
- Hoploscopa astrapias Meyrick, 1886
- Hoploscopa aurantiacalis (Snellen, 1895)
- Hoploscopa boleta Léger & Nuss in Léger, Kehlmaier, Vairappan & Nuss, 2020
- Hoploscopa brunnealis (Snellen, 1895)
- Hoploscopa cynodonta Léger & Nuss in Léger, Kehlmaier, Vairappan & Nuss, 2020
- Hoploscopa danaoensis Léger & Nuss in Léger, Kehlmaier, Vairappan & Nuss, 2020
- Hoploscopa diffusa (Hampson, 1919)
- Hoploscopa gombongi Léger & Nuss in Léger, Kehlmaier, Vairappan & Nuss, 2020
- Hoploscopa gracilis Léger & Nuss in Léger, Kehlmaier, Vairappan & Nuss, 2020
- Hoploscopa ignitamaculae Léger & Nuss in Léger, Kehlmaier, Vairappan & Nuss, 2020
- Hoploscopa isarogensis Léger & Nuss in Léger, Kehlmaier, Vairappan & Nuss, 2020
- Hoploscopa jubata Léger & Nuss in Léger, Kehlmaier, Vairappan & Nuss, 2020
- Hoploscopa kelama Léger & Nuss in Léger, Kehlmaier, Vairappan & Nuss, 2020
- Hoploscopa kinabaluensis Léger & Nuss in Léger, Kehlmaier, Vairappan & Nuss, 2020
- Hoploscopa luteomacula Nuss, 1998
- Hoploscopa mallyi Léger & Nuss in Léger, Kehlmaier, Vairappan & Nuss, 2020
- Hoploscopa marijoweissae Léger & Nuss in Léger, Kehlmaier, Vairappan & Nuss, 2020
- Hoploscopa matheae Léger & Nuss in Léger, Kehlmaier, Vairappan & Nuss, 2020
- Hoploscopa mediobrunnea (de Joannis, 1929)
- Hoploscopa metacrossa (Hampson, 1917)
- Hoploscopa nauticorum Tams, 1935
- Hoploscopa niveofascia Léger & Nuss in Léger, Kehlmaier, Vairappan & Nuss, 2020
- Hoploscopa obliqua (Rothschild, 1915)
- Hoploscopa ocellata (Hampson, 1919)
- Hoploscopa pangrangoensis Léger & Nuss in Léger, Kehlmaier, Vairappan & Nuss, 2020
- Hoploscopa parvimacula Léger & Nuss in Léger, Kehlmaier, Vairappan & Nuss, 2020
- Hoploscopa persimilis (Rothschild, 1915)
- Hoploscopa pseudometacrossa Léger & Nuss in Léger, Kehlmaier, Vairappan & Nuss, 2020
- Hoploscopa quadripuncta (Rothschild, 1915)
- Hoploscopa semifascia (Hampson, 1919)
- Hoploscopa sepanggi Léger & Nuss in Léger, Kehlmaier, Vairappan & Nuss, 2020
- Hoploscopa subvariegata (Rothschild, 1915)
- Hoploscopa sumatrensis Léger & Nuss in Léger, Kehlmaier, Vairappan & Nuss, 2020
- Hoploscopa titika Léger & Nuss in Léger, Kehlmaier, Vairappan & Nuss, 2020
- Hoploscopa tonsepi Léger & Nuss in Léger, Kehlmaier, Vairappan & Nuss, 2020
- Hoploscopa triangulifera (Hampson, 1919)
- Hoploscopa ypsilon Léger & Nuss in Léger, Kehlmaier, Vairappan & Nuss, 2020
