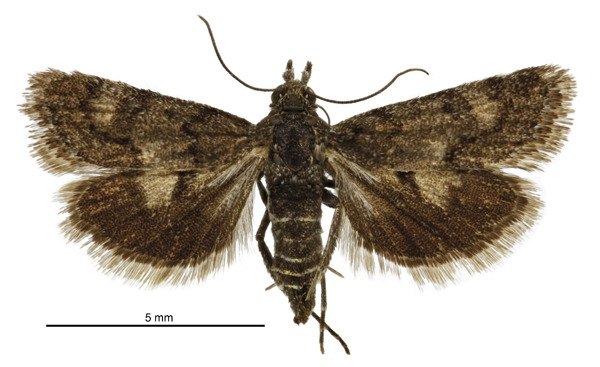
- Female

Scientific classification
- Kingdom: Animalia
- Phylum: Arthropoda
- Class: Insecta
- Order: Lepidoptera
- Family: Crambidae
- Genus: Heliothela
- Species: H. atra

Binomial name
- Heliothela atra (Butler, 1877)

Synonyms
- Orosana atra Butler, 1877; Nyctarcha atra (Butler, 1877); Heliothela erebopis Meyrick, 1913

= Heliothela atra =

Species of moth endemic to New Zealand

Heliothela atra is a moth of the family Crambidae. It was described by Arthur Gardiner Butler in 1877. This species is endemic in New Zealand and has been observed in both the North and South Islands. The preferred habitat of this species is dry tussock grasslands and short-sward sites. Adults of this species are on the wing from December until March and are day flying moths known for their rapid flight. This species is said to be associated with Melicytus alpinus.

== Taxonomy ==
This specie was first described by Arthur Gardiner Butler in 1877 and named Orosana atra. Butler used a specimen obtained from the Canterbury plains and sourced from the collection of J. D. Enys. In 1885 Edward Meyrick discussed this species and placed it within the genus Nyctarcha. In 1913 Meyrick placed this species in the genus Heliothela and renamed the species H. erebopis as he was of the opinion that the epithet atra could be confused with atralis, the type of the genus. This placement and naming was followed by George Hudson in his book The butterflies and moths of New Zealand. In 1988 J. S. Dugdale agreed with the placement of the species within the genus Heliothela but argued that the epithet should be atra as it was sufficiently distinct from atralis for it not to be regarded as a homonym. The male holotype is held at the Natural History Museum, London.

== Description ==
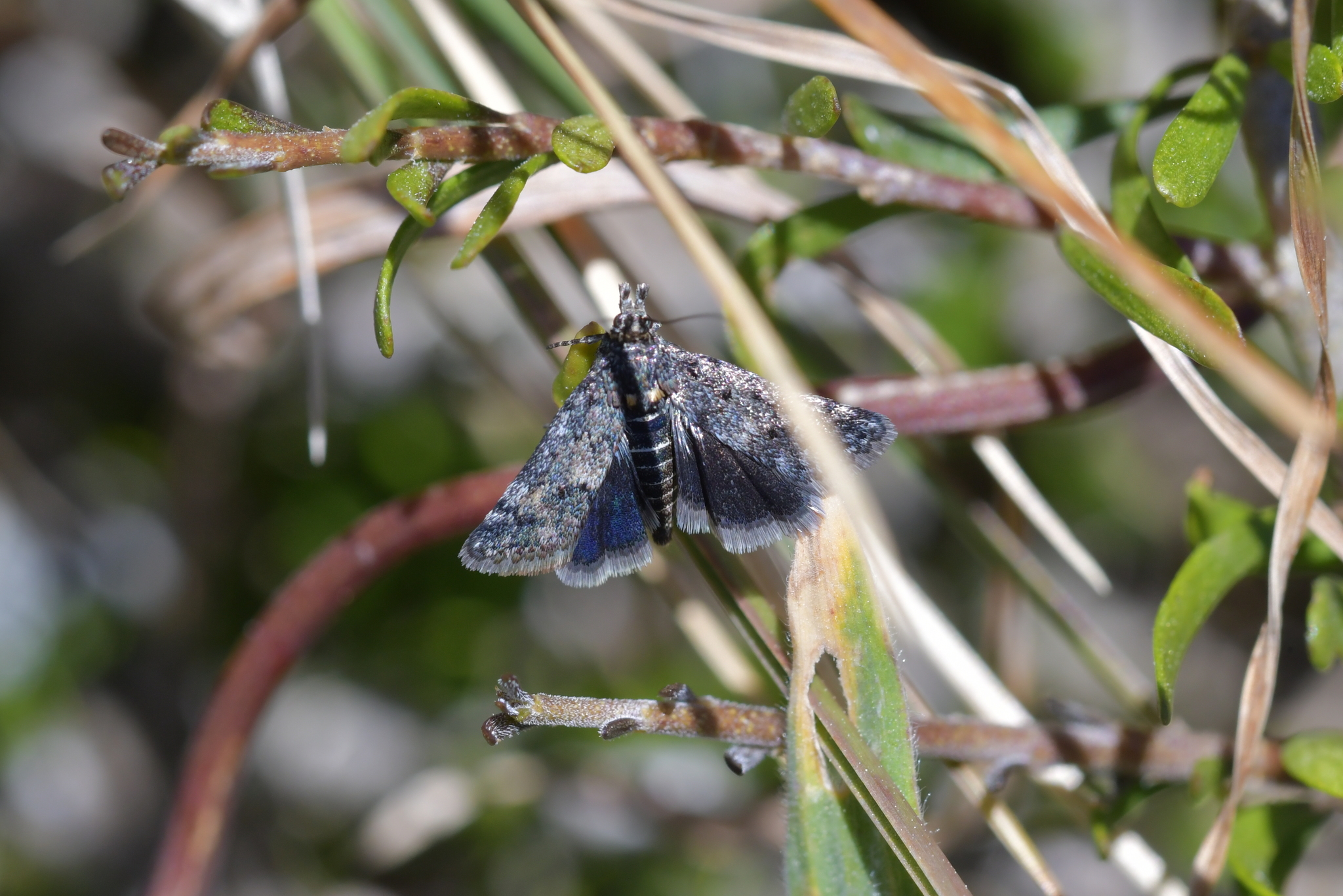
H. atra observed near Gibraltar Rock in Canterbury.

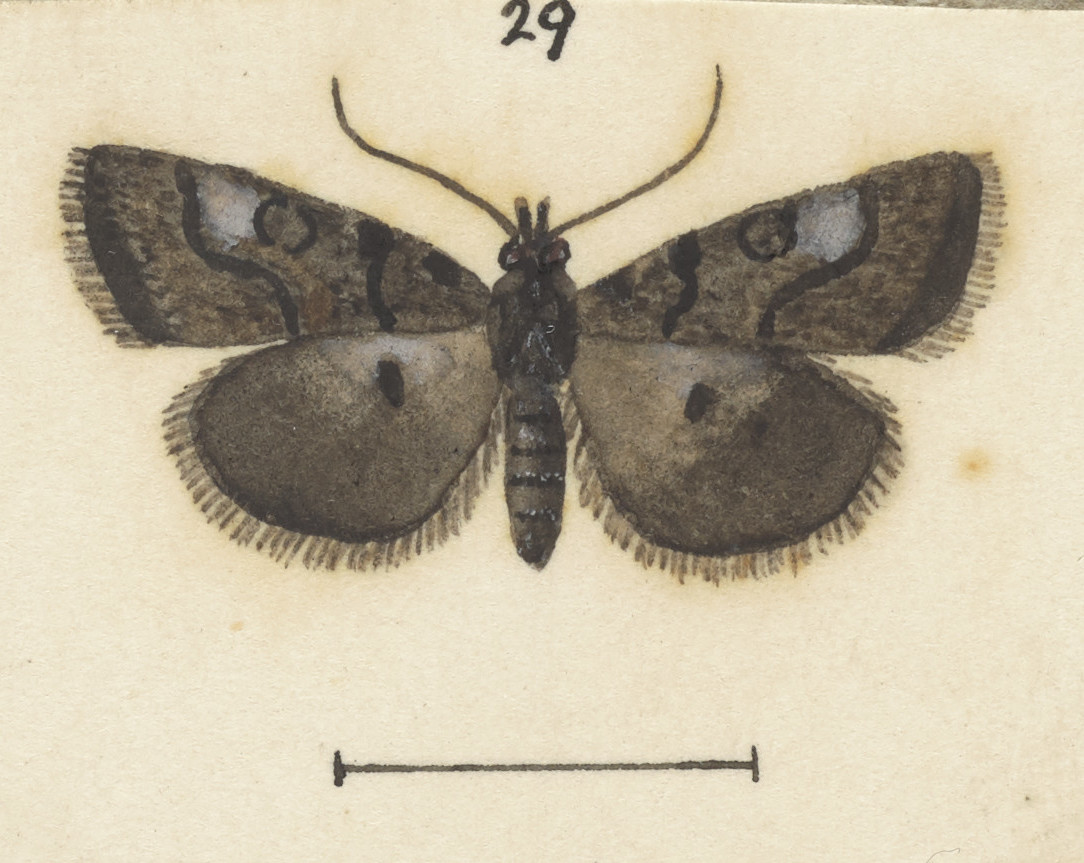
Illustration of female by G. Hudson

Meyrick described this species as follows:

Male, female. — 11-12 mm. Head, palpi, and thorax blackish, irrorated with white, basal joint of palpi white. Antennae blackish. Abdomen blackish, segmental margins white. Legs white, irrorated with black, tibiae and tarsi banded with black. Forewings oblong, somewhat dilated posteriorly, costa straight, apex rounded, hind margin very obliquely rounded; dark fuscous, sometimes partially irrorated with white; first line black, angulated; orbicular small, black, detached; claviform absent; reniform 8-shaped, outlined with black, separated from second line by a white spot, sometimes obsolete above but always distinct on under surface, suffused into costa; second line black, indented beneath costa, strongly curved inwards beneath reniform, sometimes margined posteriorly on costa with white; subterminal obsolete : cilia grey, with a waved black line, tips white. Hindwings dark fuscous; neural pectinations white; cilia as in forewings. Under surface of forewings with one or two small white spots between reniform and base, besides posterior blotch, and a whitish suffusion towards inner margin : of hindwings with a white discal suffusion, interrupted by a dark fuscous central spot.

Hudson pointed out that the dark and light markings on this species vary in colour intensity.

== Distribution ==
This species is endemic to New Zealand. It has been observed at its type locality of the Canterbury plains, at Castle Hill also in Canterbury and near Lake Wakatipu at altitudes of between 365m to 1500m. It has been observed at Arthur's Pass, Aoraki/Mount Cook, Macetown, and McKinnon Pass. It has also been observed in the North Island at Mount Ruapehu and at Waimarino. In the far south this species can be found at sea-level in dry, open habitat.

== Behaviour ==
Adult H. atra are on the wing from December until March. This species is a day flying moth and is a rapid flier.

== Habitat ==
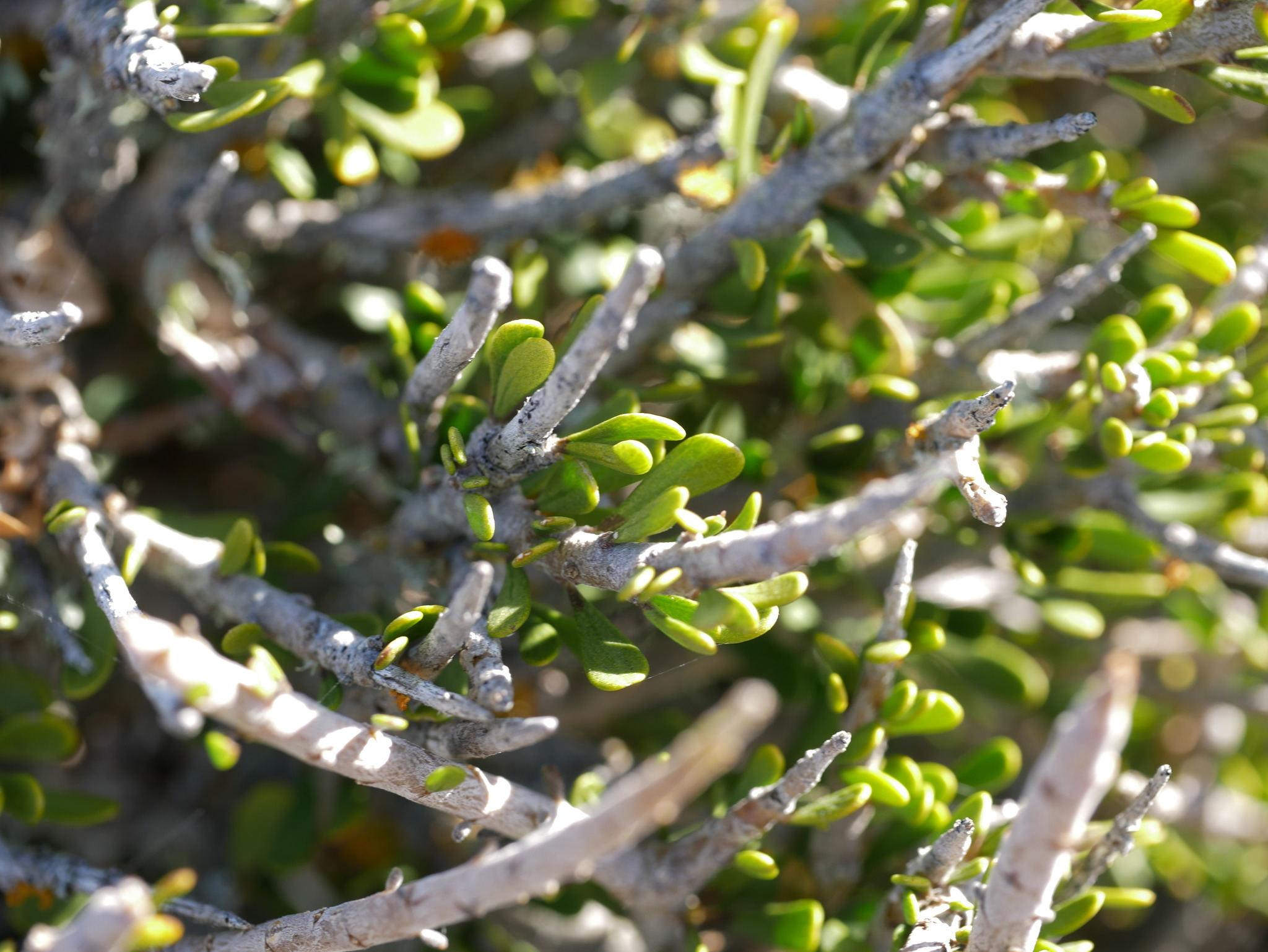
Melicytus alpinus

The habitat of this species is dry tussock grasslands and short-sward sites. H. atra is said to be associated with Melicytus alpinus.
