= Perimeceta leucoselene =

Scientific classification
- Kingdom: Animalia
- Phylum: Arthropoda
- Class: Insecta
- Order: Lepidoptera
- Family: Crambidae
- Genus: Perimeceta
- Species: P. leucoselene

Binomial name
- Perimeceta leucoselene (Hampson, 1919)

Synonyms
- Eudorina leucoselene Hampson, 1919

Species of moth

Perimeceta leucoselene is a moth in the family Crambidae. It was described by George Hampson in 1919. It is found on New Guinea.
