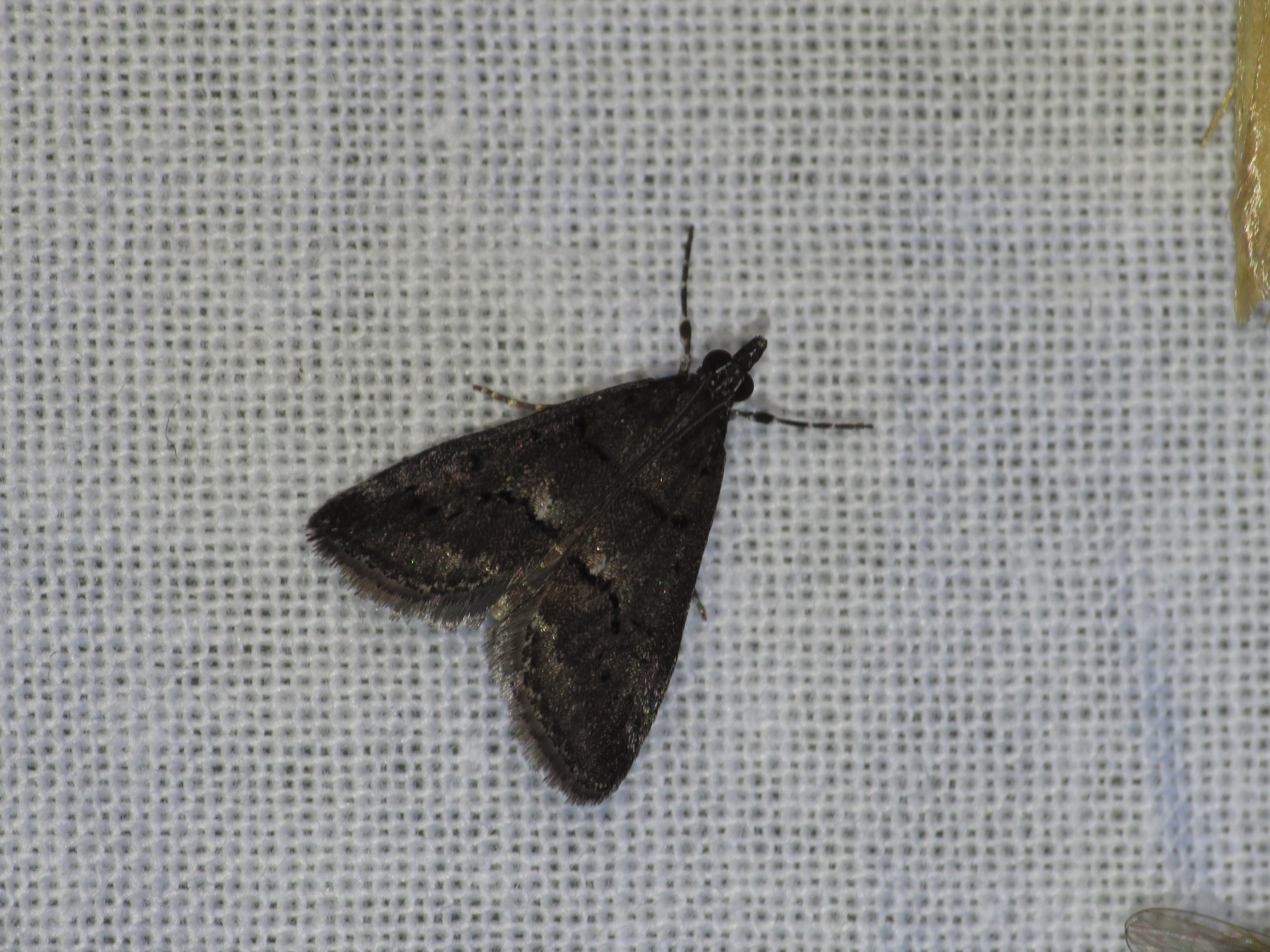

Scientific classification
- Domain: Eukaryota
- Kingdom: Animalia
- Phylum: Arthropoda
- Class: Insecta
- Order: Lepidoptera
- Family: Crambidae
- Genus: Eclipsiodes
- Species: E. crypsixantha

Binomial name
- Eclipsiodes crypsixantha Meyrick, 1884

= Eclipsiodes crypsixantha =

Species of moth

Eclipsiodes crypsixantha is a moth in the family Crambidae. It was described by Edward Meyrick in 1884. It is found in Australia, where it has been recorded from New South Wales and South Australia.
