= Phanomorpha icelomorpha =

Scientific classification
- Domain: Eukaryota
- Kingdom: Animalia
- Phylum: Arthropoda
- Class: Insecta
- Order: Lepidoptera
- Family: Crambidae
- Genus: Phanomorpha
- Species: P. icelomorpha

Binomial name
- Phanomorpha icelomorpha (Turner, 1908)

Synonyms
- Eclipsiodes icelomorpha Turner, 1908

Species of moth

Phanomorpha icelomorpha is a moth in the family Crambidae. It was described by Turner in 1908. It is found in Australia, where it has been recorded from Western Australia.
