= Phanomorpha acrocapna =

Scientific classification
- Domain: Eukaryota
- Kingdom: Animalia
- Phylum: Arthropoda
- Class: Insecta
- Order: Lepidoptera
- Family: Crambidae
- Genus: Phanomorpha
- Species: P. acrocapna

Binomial name
- Phanomorpha acrocapna (Turner, 1915)

Synonyms
- Eclipsiodes acrocapna Turner, 1915

Species of moth

Phanomorpha acrocapna is a moth in the family Crambidae. It was described by Turner in 1915. It is found in Australia, where it has been recorded from Queensland and New South Wales.
