= Heliothela nigralbata =

Scientific classification
- Domain: Eukaryota
- Kingdom: Animalia
- Phylum: Arthropoda
- Class: Insecta
- Order: Lepidoptera
- Family: Crambidae
- Genus: Heliothela
- Species: H. nigralbata

Binomial name
- Heliothela nigralbata Leech, 1889

Species of moth

Heliothela nigralbata is a moth of the family Crambidae. It was described by John Henry Leech in 1889. It is found in Zhejiang, China.
