= Phanomorpha mesogramma =

Scientific classification
- Domain: Eukaryota
- Kingdom: Animalia
- Phylum: Arthropoda
- Class: Insecta
- Order: Lepidoptera
- Family: Crambidae
- Genus: Phanomorpha
- Species: P. mesogramma

Binomial name
- Phanomorpha mesogramma (Lower, 1900)

Synonyms
- Scoparia mesogramma Lower, 1900

Species of moth

Phanomorpha mesogramma is a moth in the family Crambidae. It was described by Oswald Bertram Lower in 1900. It is found in Australia, where it has been recorded from New South Wales.
