= Perimeceta =

Scientific classification
- Kingdom: Animalia
- Phylum: Arthropoda
- Class: Insecta
- Order: Lepidoptera
- Family: Crambidae
- Subfamily: Heliothelinae
- Genus: Perimeceta; Turner, 1915

Synonyms
- Phanerobela Turner, 1932

Genus of moths

Perimeceta is a genus of moths of the family Crambidae.

== Species ==
- Perimeceta incrustalis (Snellen, 1895)
- Perimeceta leucoselene (Hampson, 1919)
- Perimeceta leucosticta (Hampson, 1919)
- Perimeceta niphotypa Turner, 1915
