= Phanomorpha lichenopa =

Scientific classification
- Domain: Eukaryota
- Kingdom: Animalia
- Phylum: Arthropoda
- Class: Insecta
- Order: Lepidoptera
- Family: Crambidae
- Genus: Phanomorpha
- Species: P. lichenopa

Binomial name
- Phanomorpha lichenopa (Lower, 1897)

Synonyms
- Scoparia lichenopa Lower, 1897

Species of moth

Phanomorpha lichenopa is a moth in the family Crambidae. It was described by Oswald Bertram Lower in 1897. It is found in Australia, where it has been recorded from New South Wales.
