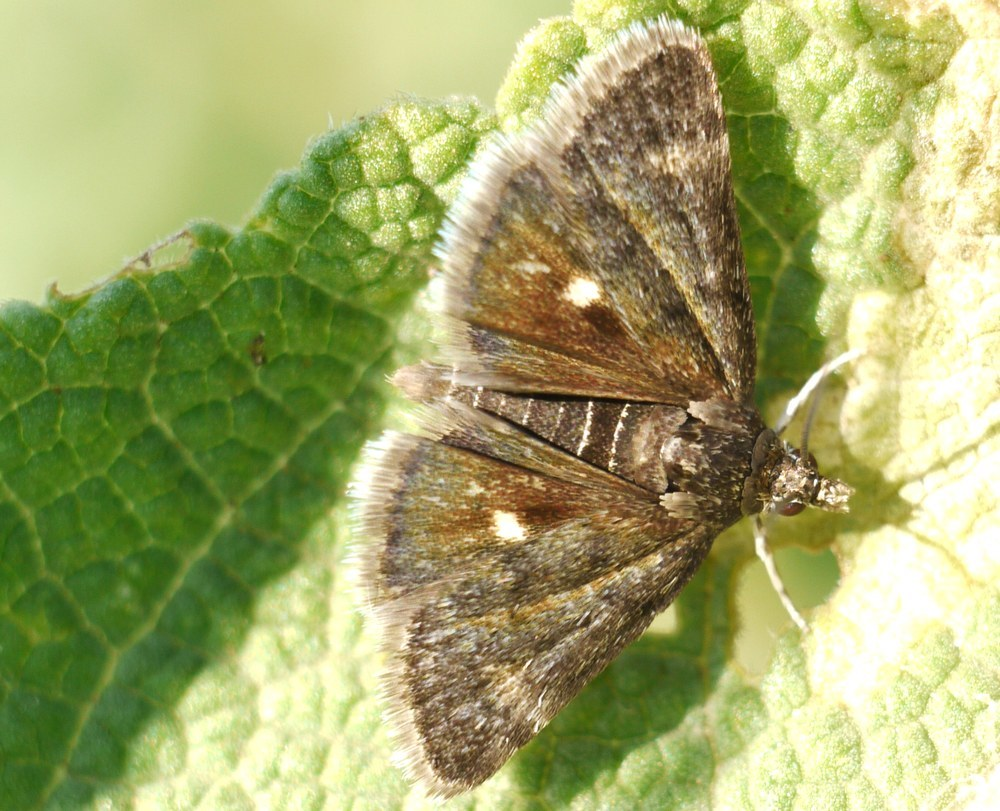
- Heliothela wulfeniana, Ukraine

Scientific classification
- Domain: Eukaryota
- Kingdom: Animalia
- Phylum: Arthropoda
- Class: Insecta
- Order: Lepidoptera
- Superfamily: Pyraloidea
- Family: Crambidae
- Subfamily: Heliothelinae; Amsel, 1961

= Heliothelinae =

Subfamily of moths

Heliothelinae is a subfamily of the lepidopteran family Crambidae. It was described by Hans Georg Amsel in 1961.

== Genera ==
- Eclipsiodes Meyrick, 1884
- Heliothela Guenée, 1854 (= Nyctarcha Meyrick, 1884, Orosana Walker, 1863)
- Phanomorpha Turner, 1937
