= Phanomorpha semigilva =

Scientific classification
- Domain: Eukaryota
- Kingdom: Animalia
- Phylum: Arthropoda
- Class: Insecta
- Order: Lepidoptera
- Family: Crambidae
- Genus: Phanomorpha
- Species: P. semigilva

Binomial name
- Phanomorpha semigilva (Turner, 1922)

Synonyms
- Eclipsiodes semigilva Turner, 1922

Species of moth

Phanomorpha semigilva is a moth in the family Crambidae. It was described by Turner in 1922. It is found in Australia, where it has been recorded from Victoria.
