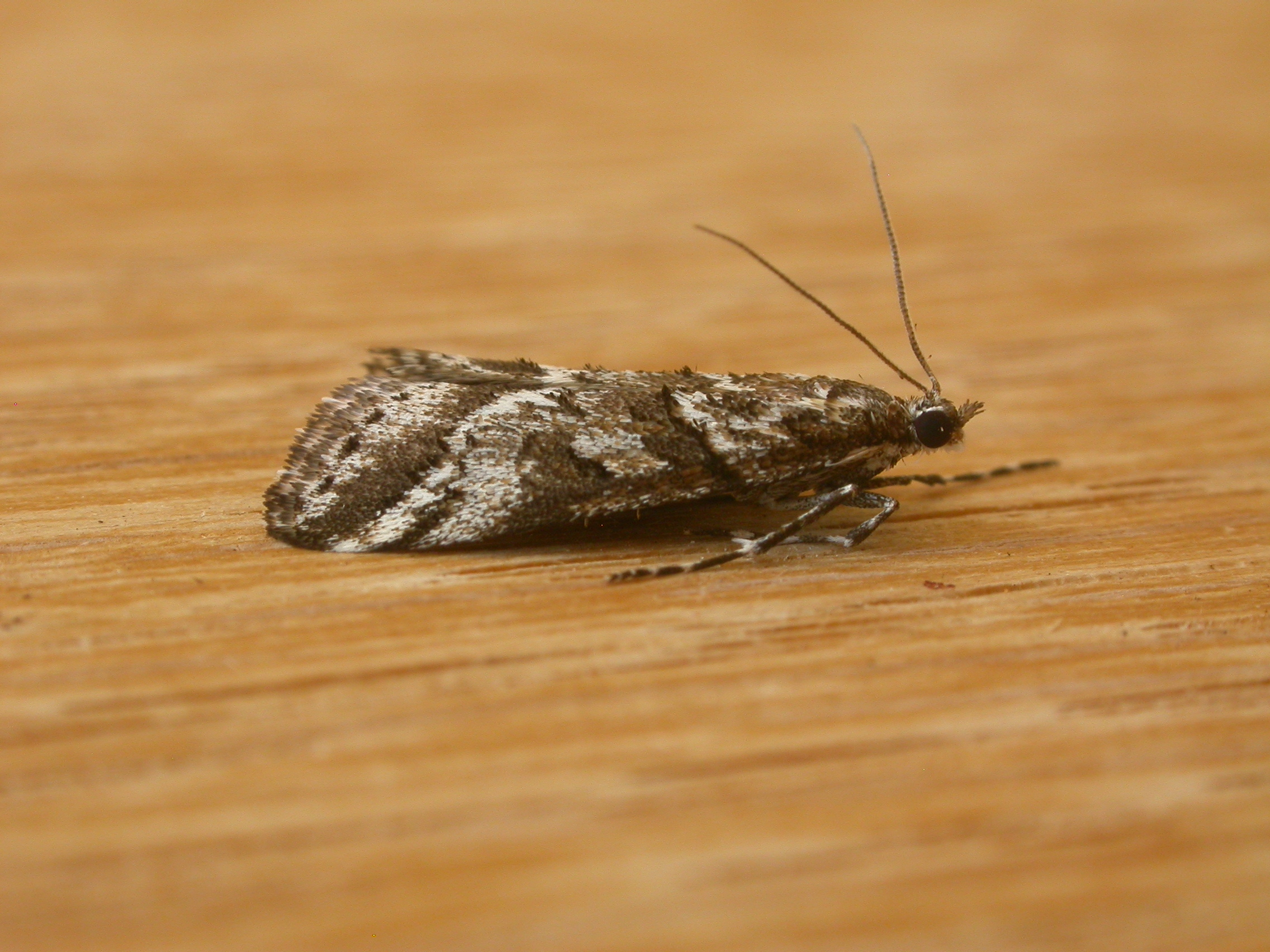
- Phanomorpha dapsilis

Scientific classification
- Domain: Eukaryota
- Kingdom: Animalia
- Phylum: Arthropoda
- Class: Insecta
- Order: Lepidoptera
- Family: Crambidae
- Subfamily: Scopariinae
- Genus: Phanomorpha; Turner, 1937

= Phanomorpha =

Genus of moths

Phanomorpha is a genus of moths of the family Crambidae.

== Species ==
- Phanomorpha acrocapna (Turner, 1915)
- Phanomorpha anisophragma (Lower, 1901)
- Phanomorpha dapsilis (Turner, 1908)
- Phanomorpha drosera (Meyrick, 1887)
- Phanomorpha icelomorpha (Turner, 1908)
- Phanomorpha lichenopa (Lower, 1897)
- Phanomorpha marmaropa (Meyrick, 1889)
- Phanomorpha meliphyrta (Turner, 1908)
- Phanomorpha mesogramma (Lower, 1900)
- Phanomorpha orthogramma (Lower, 1902)
- Phanomorpha pammicta (Turner, 1908)
- Phanomorpha persumptana (Walker, 1863)
- Phanomorpha schizodesma (Lower, 1899)
- Phanomorpha semigilva (Turner, 1922)
- Phanomorpha striatalis (Hampson, 1907)
- Phanomorpha susanae (Lower, 1900)
