= Phanomorpha schizodesma =

Scientific classification
- Domain: Eukaryota
- Kingdom: Animalia
- Phylum: Arthropoda
- Class: Insecta
- Order: Lepidoptera
- Family: Crambidae
- Genus: Phanomorpha
- Species: P. schizodesma

Binomial name
- Phanomorpha schizodesma (Lower, 1899)

Synonyms
- Scoparia schizodesma Lower, 1899; Eclipsiodes schizodesma

Species of moth

Phanomorpha schizodesma is a moth in the family Crambidae. It was described by Oswald Bertram Lower in 1899. It is found in Australia, where it has been recorded from New South Wales.
