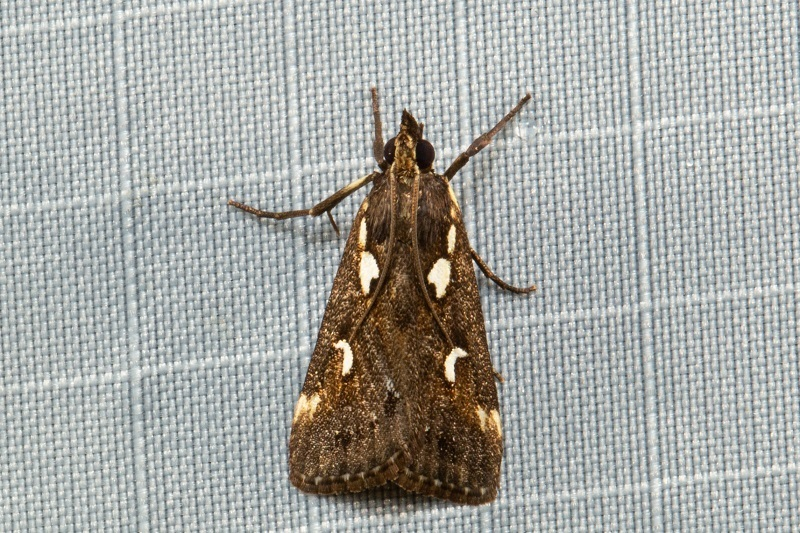
- Perimeceta niphotypa, Australia

Scientific classification
- Domain: Eukaryota
- Kingdom: Animalia
- Phylum: Arthropoda
- Class: Insecta
- Order: Lepidoptera
- Clade: Obtectomera
- Superfamily: Pyraloidea
- Family: Crambidae
- Subfamily: Hoploscopinae; Robinson et al., 1994

= Hoploscopinae =

Subfamily of moths

Hoploscopinae is a subfamily of the lepidopteran family Crambidae. It was described by Robinson et al., 1994.

In the past, the group had been considered a subfamily of Heliothelinae based on a sclerotized thorn that is invaginated into the corpus bursae of the female genitalia. This morphological feature common to both Hoploscopinae and Heliothelinae was considered an apomorphy of Heliothelinae sensu lato. However, a phylogenetic analysis of Crambidae moths found that Hoploscopinae and Heliothelinae do not form a monophyletic group, and consequently split the two lineages into separate subfamilies.

The subfamily currently comprises the two genera Hoploscopa Meyrick, 1886 and Perimeceta Turner, 1915, with altogether 46 species occurring in Southeast Asia, New Guinea and Australia. The caterpillars feed on ferns.
