= A. hova =

A. hova may refer to:

- Abacetus hova, a ground beetle
- Acraea hova, a butterfly found in Madagascar
- Azygophleps hova, a synonym of Zeuzeropecten castaneus, a moth found in Madagascar
