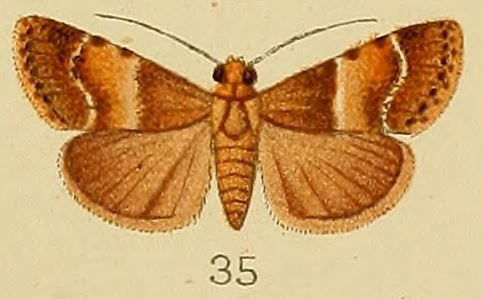

Scientific classification
- Domain: Eukaryota
- Kingdom: Animalia
- Phylum: Arthropoda
- Class: Insecta
- Order: Lepidoptera
- Family: Pyralidae
- Genus: Orthaga
- Species: O. fuscofascialis

Binomial name
- Orthaga fuscofascialis Kenrick, 1907

= Orthaga fuscofascialis =

Species of moth

Orthaga fuscofascialis is a species of snout moth in the genus Orthaga. It is found in New Guinea.
