= Eilema inornata =

Scientific classification
- Domain: Eukaryota
- Kingdom: Animalia
- Phylum: Arthropoda
- Class: Insecta
- Order: Lepidoptera
- Superfamily: Noctuoidea
- Family: Erebidae
- Subfamily: Arctiinae
- Genus: Eilema
- Species: E. inornata

Binomial name
- Eilema inornata (Kenrick, 1914)

Synonyms
- Ilema inornata Kenrick, 1914

Species of moth

Eilema inornata is a moth of the subfamily Arctiinae. It was described by George Hamilton Kenrick in 1914. It is found on Madagascar.
