= Fig leaf (disambiguation) =

In culture, a fig leaf is a literal or figurative method of obscuring an act or object considered embarrassing or distasteful with something of innocuous appearance.

Fig leaf or figleaf may also refer to:

== Arts and entertainment ==
- The Fig Leaves Are Falling, a 1969 musical
- Fig Leaves, a 1926 American silent comedy film

== Wildlife ==
- Figleaf goosefoot, a species of plant
- Figleaf gourd, a species of plant
- Figleaf Moth

== Other uses ==
- Figleaf (linguistics), language used to prevent a bigoted statement from being perceived as bigoted
- Figleaves, an online lingerie retailer
