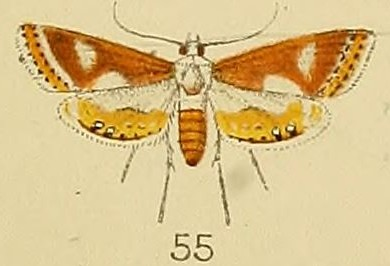

Scientific classification
- Domain: Eukaryota
- Kingdom: Animalia
- Phylum: Arthropoda
- Class: Insecta
- Order: Lepidoptera
- Family: Crambidae
- Genus: Aulacodes
- Species: A. lunalis

Binomial name
- Aulacodes lunalis Kenrick, 1907

= Aulacodes lunalis =

Species of moth

Aulacodes lunalis is a species of moth of the family Crambidae. It was described by George Hamilton Kenrick in 1907 and is found in Papua New Guinea.

It has a wingspan of 20 mm.
