= Aulacodes bipunctalis =

Scientific classification
- Domain: Eukaryota
- Kingdom: Animalia
- Phylum: Arthropoda
- Class: Insecta
- Order: Lepidoptera
- Family: Crambidae
- Genus: Aulacodes
- Species: A. bipunctalis

Binomial name
- Aulacodes bipunctalis Kenrick, 1907

Species of moth

Aulacodes bipunctalis is a species of moth of the family Crambidae described by George Hamilton Kenrick in 1907. It is found in Papua New Guinea.

It has a wingspan of 23 mm.
