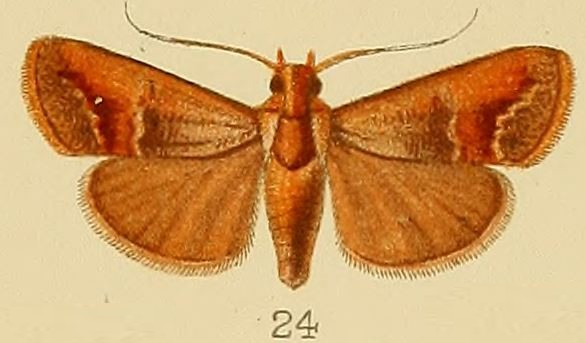

Scientific classification
- Kingdom: Animalia
- Phylum: Arthropoda
- Class: Insecta
- Order: Lepidoptera
- Family: Pyralidae
- Genus: Orthaga
- Species: O. castanealis

Binomial name
- Orthaga castanealis (Kenrick, 1907)

Synonyms
- Locastra castanealis Kenrick, 1907

= Orthaga castanealis =

Species of moth

Orthaga castanealis is a species of snout moth in the genus Orthaga. It was described by George Hamilton Kenrick in 1907, and is known from Papua New Guinea (including Dinawa, the type location).

It has a wingspan of 36 mm.
