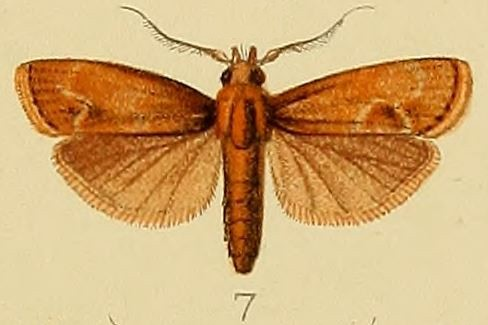

Scientific classification
- Domain: Eukaryota
- Kingdom: Animalia
- Phylum: Arthropoda
- Class: Insecta
- Order: Lepidoptera
- Family: Pyralidae
- Genus: Nephopterix
- Species: N. fuscalis

Binomial name
- Nephopterix fuscalis (Kenrick, 1907)

Synonyms
- Etiella fuscalis Kenrich, 1907

= Nephopterix fuscalis =

Species of moth

Nephopterix fuscalis is a species of snout moth in the genus Nephopterix. It was described by George Hamilton Kenrick in 1907. It is found in New Guinea.
