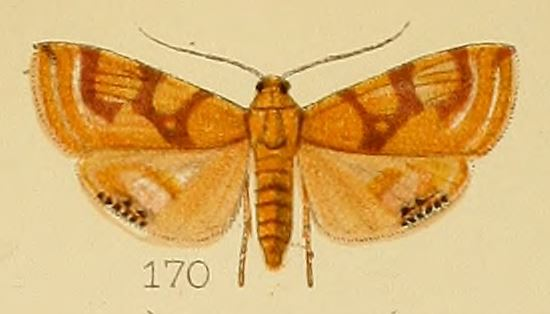

Scientific classification
- Kingdom: Animalia
- Phylum: Arthropoda
- Class: Insecta
- Order: Lepidoptera
- Family: Crambidae
- Genus: Talanga
- Species: T. quadristigmalis

Binomial name
- Talanga quadristigmalis (Kenrick, 1907)

Synonyms
- Glyphodes quadristigmalis Kenrick, 1907

= Talanga quadristigmalis =

Species of moth

Talanga quadristigmalis is a species of moth of the family Crambidae. It was described by George Hamilton Kenrick in 1907 and is found in Papua New Guinea.

It has a wingspan of 32 mm.
