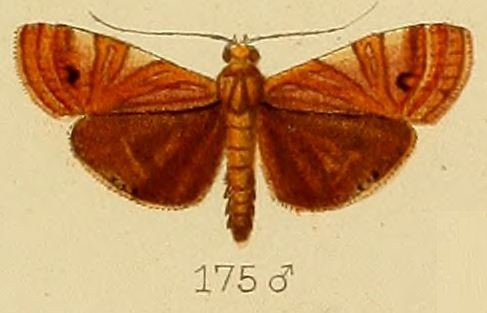

Scientific classification
- Kingdom: Animalia
- Phylum: Arthropoda
- Class: Insecta
- Order: Lepidoptera
- Family: Crambidae
- Genus: Talanga
- Species: T. exquisitalis

Binomial name
- Talanga exquisitalis (Kenrick, 1907)

Synonyms
- Glyphodes exquisitalis Kenrick, 1907

= Talanga exquisitalis =

Species of moth

Talanga exquisitalis is a species of moth of the family Crambidae. It was described by George Hamilton Kenrick in 1907 and is found in Papua New Guinea.

It has a wingspan of 32 mm.
