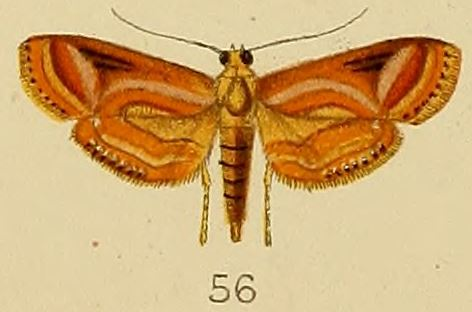

Scientific classification
- Domain: Eukaryota
- Kingdom: Animalia
- Phylum: Arthropoda
- Class: Insecta
- Order: Lepidoptera
- Family: Crambidae
- Genus: Aulacodes
- Species: A. purpurealis

Binomial name
- Aulacodes purpurealis Kenrick, 1907

= Aulacodes purpurealis =

Species of moth

Aulacodes purpurealis is a species of moth of the family Crambidae. It was described by George Hamilton Kenrick in 1907 and is found in Papua New Guinea.

It has a wingspan of 25 mm.
