= Orthaga columbalis =

Scientific classification
- Domain: Eukaryota
- Kingdom: Animalia
- Phylum: Arthropoda
- Class: Insecta
- Order: Lepidoptera
- Family: Pyralidae
- Genus: Orthaga
- Species: O. columbalis

Binomial name
- Orthaga columbalis Kenrick, 1907

Species of moth

Orthaga columbalis is a species of snout moth in the genus Orthaga. It is found in New Guinea.
