= List of lymantriid genera: F =

The large moth subfamily Lymantriinae contains the following genera beginning with F:

- Fanala
