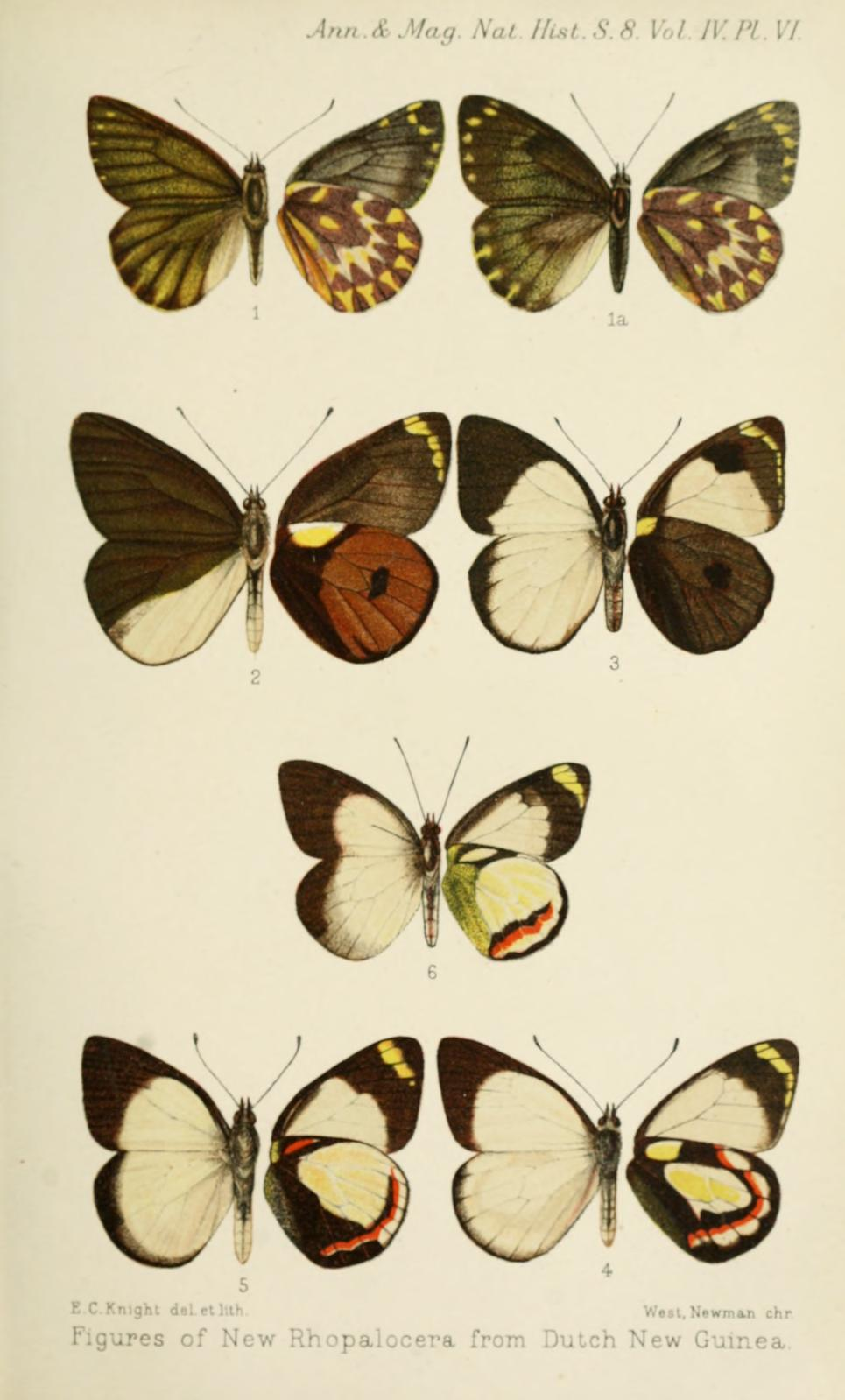
- Delias bakeri in Kenrick, 1909 Descriptions of Delias from New Guinea

Scientific classification
- Domain: Eukaryota
- Kingdom: Animalia
- Phylum: Arthropoda
- Class: Insecta
- Order: Lepidoptera
- Family: Pieridae
- Genus: Delias
- Species: D. bakeri

Binomial name
- Delias bakeri Kenrick, 1909

= Delias bakeri =

Species of butterfly

Delias bakeri is a butterfly in the family Pieridae. It was described by George Hamilton Kenrick in 1909. It is found in New Guinea (Arfak Mountains).
