= Syllepte aureotinctalis =

Scientific classification
- Domain: Eukaryota
- Kingdom: Animalia
- Phylum: Arthropoda
- Class: Insecta
- Order: Lepidoptera
- Family: Crambidae
- Genus: Syllepte
- Species: S. aureotinctalis

Binomial name
- Syllepte aureotinctalis (Kenrick, 1917)

Synonyms
- Pyrausta aureotinctalis Kenrick, 1917

Species of moth

Syllepte aureotinctalis is a moth in the family Crambidae described by George Hamilton Kenrick in 1917. It is known from Madagascar.

The forewings of this species are semi-hyaline with golden reflections, the antemedian line is indicated by two dark dots; a dark dot at the end of the cell and two dots nearer the inner margin. The postmedian line is indicated by four faint dots. The hindwings are similar, with a row of dark marginal dots and golden fringes. The wingspan of this moth is about 34 mm.
