= Zeuzeropecten combustus =

Scientific classification
- Domain: Eukaryota
- Kingdom: Animalia
- Phylum: Arthropoda
- Class: Insecta
- Order: Lepidoptera
- Family: Cossidae
- Genus: Zeuzeropecten
- Species: Z. combustus

Binomial name
- Zeuzeropecten combustus (Kenrick, 1914)

Synonyms
- Duomitus combustus Kenrick, 1914; Phragmataecia argillosa Le Cerf, 1919

Species of moth

Zeuzeropecten combustus is a moth of the family Cossidae. It is found in Madagascar.

This is a large heavy moth with a wingspan of 70 mm for the males.
