= Zeuzeropecten occultoides =

Scientific classification
- Domain: Eukaryota
- Kingdom: Animalia
- Phylum: Arthropoda
- Class: Insecta
- Order: Lepidoptera
- Family: Cossidae
- Genus: Zeuzeropecten
- Species: Z. occultoides

Binomial name
- Zeuzeropecten occultoides (Kenrick, 1914)

Synonyms
- Duomitus occultoides Kenrick, 1914

Species of moth

Zeuzeropecten occultoides is a moth of the family Cossidae. It is found in Madagascar.

This is a large heavy moth with a wingspan of 80 mm for the males and 90 mm for the females.
