= Orthaga amphimelas =

Scientific classification
- Kingdom: Animalia
- Phylum: Arthropoda
- Clade: Pancrustacea
- Class: Insecta
- Order: Lepidoptera
- Family: Pyralidae
- Genus: Orthaga
- Species: O. amphimelas

Binomial name
- Orthaga amphimelas Turner, 1913

Species of moth

Orthaga amphimelas is a species of snout moth, family Pyralidae. It is known from Australia.
