= Orthaga haemarphoralis =

Scientific classification
- Kingdom: Animalia
- Phylum: Arthropoda
- Class: Insecta
- Order: Lepidoptera
- Family: Pyralidae
- Genus: Orthaga
- Species: O. haemarphoralis

Binomial name
- Orthaga haemarphoralis Hampson, 1916

Species of moth

Orthaga haemarphoralis is a species of snout moth in the genus Orthaga. It is found in New Guinea.
