= Nephopterix hajastanica =

Scientific classification
- Kingdom: Animalia
- Phylum: Arthropoda
- Class: Insecta
- Order: Lepidoptera
- Family: Pyralidae
- Genus: Nephopterix
- Species: N. hajastanica

Binomial name
- Nephopterix hajastanica Harutiunian, 1989

Species of moth

Nephopterix hajastanica is a species of snout moth in the genus Nephopterix. It was described by Harutiunian in 1989. It is found in Armenia.
