= Orthaga seminivea =

Scientific classification
- Kingdom: Animalia
- Phylum: Arthropoda
- Clade: Pancrustacea
- Class: Insecta
- Order: Lepidoptera
- Family: Pyralidae
- Genus: Orthaga
- Species: O. seminivea

Binomial name
- Orthaga seminivea (Warren, 1895)

Synonyms
- Stericta seminivea Warren, 1895; Stericta chionopa Lower, 1896

Species of moth

Orthaga seminivea is a species of snout moth in the genus Orthaga. It is found in Australia.

The wingspan is about 20 mm. Adults are white with a dark brown pattern.

The larvae feed on Glochidion ferdinandi. They live in a shelter of leaves joined by silk.
