= Aulacodes briocusalis =

Scientific classification
- Kingdom: Animalia
- Phylum: Arthropoda
- Class: Insecta
- Order: Lepidoptera
- Family: Crambidae
- Genus: Aulacodes
- Species: A. briocusalis

Binomial name
- Aulacodes briocusalis (Schaus, 1924)

Synonyms
- Parthenodes briocusalis Schaus, 1924

Species of moth

Aulacodes briocusalis is a species of moth in the family Crambidae. It was described by Schaus in 1924. It is found in Suriname.
