= Nephopterix griseola =

Scientific classification
- Domain: Eukaryota
- Kingdom: Animalia
- Phylum: Arthropoda
- Class: Insecta
- Order: Lepidoptera
- Family: Pyralidae
- Genus: Nephopterix
- Species: N. griseola

Binomial name
- Nephopterix griseola Rothschild, 1915

Species of moth

Nephopterix griseola is a species of snout moth in the genus Nephopterix. It was described by Walter Rothschild in 1915. It is found in Algeria.
