= Nephopterix obscuribasella =

Scientific classification
- Domain: Eukaryota
- Kingdom: Animalia
- Phylum: Arthropoda
- Class: Insecta
- Order: Lepidoptera
- Family: Pyralidae
- Genus: Nephopterix
- Species: N. obscuribasella

Binomial name
- Nephopterix obscuribasella Ragonot, 1887

Species of moth

Nephopterix obscuribasella is a species of snout moth in the genus Nephopterix. It was described by Ragonot in 1887. It was described from Saisan.
