= Nephopterix nocticolorella =

Scientific classification
- Domain: Eukaryota
- Kingdom: Animalia
- Phylum: Arthropoda
- Class: Insecta
- Order: Lepidoptera
- Family: Pyralidae
- Genus: Nephopterix
- Species: N. nocticolorella

Binomial name
- Nephopterix nocticolorella Ragonot, 1887

Species of moth

Nephopterix nocticolorella is a species of snout moth in the genus Nephopterix. It was described by Émile Louis Ragonot in 1887. It is found in the Russian Far East (it was described from the Amur region).
