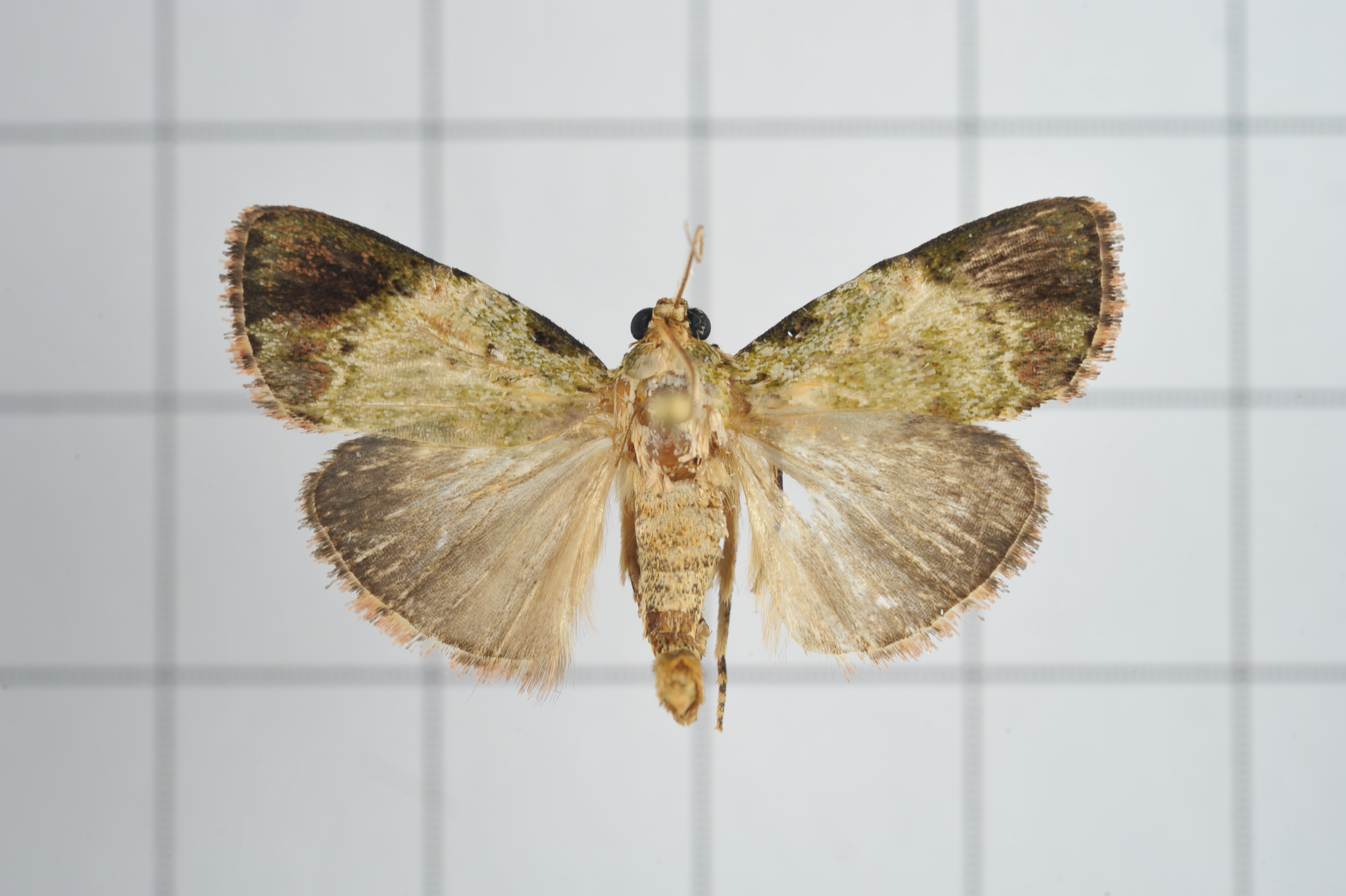

Scientific classification
- Kingdom: Animalia
- Phylum: Arthropoda
- Class: Insecta
- Order: Lepidoptera
- Family: Pyralidae
- Genus: Orthaga
- Species: O. euadrusalis

Binomial name
- Orthaga euadrusalis Walker, 1858

Synonyms
- Orthaga acontialis Walker, 1863

= Orthaga euadrusalis =

Species of moth

Orthaga euadrusalis, the mango leaf webber, is a species of snout moth in the genus Orthaga. It was described by Francis Walker in 1858. It is found on Borneo and in India.

The larvae feed on Mangifera indica.
