= Orthaga eumictalis =

Scientific classification
- Kingdom: Animalia
- Phylum: Arthropoda
- Class: Insecta
- Order: Lepidoptera
- Family: Pyralidae
- Genus: Orthaga
- Species: O. eumictalis

Binomial name
- Orthaga eumictalis Hampson, 1916

Species of moth

Orthaga eumictalis is a species of snout moth in the genus Orthaga. It is found in New Guinea.
