= Orthaga euryzona =

Scientific classification
- Kingdom: Animalia
- Phylum: Arthropoda
- Class: Insecta
- Order: Lepidoptera
- Family: Pyralidae
- Genus: Orthaga
- Species: O. euryzona

Binomial name
- Orthaga euryzona Hampson, 1896

Species of moth

Orthaga euryzona is a species of snout moth in the genus Orthaga. It is found in Burma.
