= Aulacodes cilianalis =

Scientific classification
- Kingdom: Animalia
- Phylum: Arthropoda
- Class: Insecta
- Order: Lepidoptera
- Family: Crambidae
- Genus: Aulacodes
- Species: A. cilianalis

Binomial name
- Aulacodes cilianalis (Schaus, 1924)

Synonyms
- Ambia cilianalis Schaus, 1924

Species of moth

Aulacodes cilianalis is a species of moth in the family Crambidae. It was described by William Schaus in 1924. It is found in Suriname.

The wingspan is about 14 mm. The wings are white, with mostly light cadmium markings.
