= Orthaga leucatma =

Scientific classification
- Kingdom: Animalia
- Phylum: Arthropoda
- Class: Insecta
- Order: Lepidoptera
- Family: Pyralidae
- Genus: Orthaga
- Species: O. leucatma

Binomial name
- Orthaga leucatma (Meyrick, 1932)

Synonyms
- Balanotis leucatma Meyrick, 1932

Species of moth

Orthaga leucatma is a species of snout moth in the genus Orthaga. It is found in Sri Lanka.
