= Orthaga ecphoceana =

Scientific classification
- Kingdom: Animalia
- Phylum: Arthropoda
- Class: Insecta
- Order: Lepidoptera
- Family: Pyralidae
- Genus: Orthaga
- Species: O. ecphoceana

Binomial name
- Orthaga ecphoceana Hampson, 1916

Species of moth

Orthaga ecphoceana is a species of snout moth in the genus Orthaga, belonging to the subfamily Epipaschiinae. It was described by George Hampson in 1916 and is found in New Guinea.

The genus Orthaga was established by Francis Walker in 1859 and contains more than 50 species of snout moths distributed primarily across tropical Asia and Australasia. Like other members of the Epipaschiinae, adult males of Orthaga species can be recognized by their upturned and pointed third segment of the labial palps.
