= Nephopterix furella =

Scientific classification
- Kingdom: Animalia
- Phylum: Arthropoda
- Clade: Pancrustacea
- Class: Insecta
- Order: Lepidoptera
- Family: Pyralidae
- Genus: Nephopterix
- Species: N. furella

Binomial name
- Nephopterix furella (Strand, 1918)

Synonyms
- Etiella furella Strand, 1918

Species of insect

Nephopterix furella is a species of snout moth in the genus Nephopterix. It was described by Embrik Strand in 1918. It is found in Taiwan.
