= Aulacodes chionostola =

Scientific classification
- Kingdom: Animalia
- Phylum: Arthropoda
- Class: Insecta
- Order: Lepidoptera
- Family: Crambidae
- Genus: Aulacodes
- Species: A. chionostola

Binomial name
- Aulacodes chionostola (Hampson, 1917)

Synonyms
- Cataclysta chionostola Hampson, 1917; Cataclysta phocosalis Schaus, 1924

Species of moth

Aulacodes chionostola is a species of moth in the family Crambidae. It was described by George Hampson in 1917. It is found in Peru.
