= Orthaga molleri =

Scientific classification
- Kingdom: Animalia
- Phylum: Arthropoda
- Class: Insecta
- Order: Lepidoptera
- Family: Pyralidae
- Genus: Orthaga
- Species: O. molleri

Binomial name
- Orthaga molleri Hampson, 1896

Species of moth

Orthaga molleri is a species of snout moth in the genus Orthaga. It is found in India.
