= Orthaga achatina =

Scientific classification
- Domain: Eukaryota
- Kingdom: Animalia
- Phylum: Arthropoda
- Class: Insecta
- Order: Lepidoptera
- Family: Pyralidae
- Genus: Orthaga
- Species: O. achatina

Binomial name
- Orthaga achatina (Butler, 1878)

Synonyms
- Glossina achatina Butler, 1878

Species of moth

Orthaga achatina is a species of snout moth in the genus Orthaga. It was described by Arthur Gardiner Butler in 1878 and is known from Japan and Russia.

The larvae are a pest on Cinnamomum camphora.
