= Aulacodes congallalis =

Scientific classification
- Kingdom: Animalia
- Phylum: Arthropoda
- Class: Insecta
- Order: Lepidoptera
- Family: Crambidae
- Genus: Aulacodes
- Species: A. congallalis

Binomial name
- Aulacodes congallalis Schaus, 1924

Species of moth

Aulacodes congallalis is a species of moth in the family Crambidae. It was described by William Schaus in 1924. It is found in Guatemala.
