= Aulacodes caepiosalis =

Scientific classification
- Kingdom: Animalia
- Phylum: Arthropoda
- Class: Insecta
- Order: Lepidoptera
- Family: Crambidae
- Genus: Aulacodes
- Species: A. caepiosalis

Binomial name
- Aulacodes caepiosalis (Walker, 1859)

Synonyms
- Hydrophysa caepiosalis Walker, 1859

Species of moth

Aulacodes caepiosalis is a species of moth in the family Crambidae. It was described by Francis Walker in 1859. It is found in Brazil.
