= Orthaga erebochlaena =

Scientific classification
- Kingdom: Animalia
- Phylum: Arthropoda
- Class: Insecta
- Order: Lepidoptera
- Family: Pyralidae
- Genus: Orthaga
- Species: O. erebochlaena

Binomial name
- Orthaga erebochlaena Meyrick, 1938

Species of moth

Orthaga erebochlaena is a species of snout moth in the genus Orthaga. It is found on the island of Java.

The moth has a yellowish color and dark spots near the edges of its wings.
