= Aulacodes hodevalis =

Scientific classification
- Kingdom: Animalia
- Phylum: Arthropoda
- Class: Insecta
- Order: Lepidoptera
- Family: Crambidae
- Genus: Aulacodes
- Species: A. hodevalis

Binomial name
- Aulacodes hodevalis (H. Druce, 1896)

Synonyms
- Paraponyx hodevalis H. Druce, 1896

Species of moth

Aulacodes hodevalis is a species of moth in the family Crambidae. It was described by Herbert Druce in 1896. It is found in Guatemala.
