= Aulacodes chalcialis =

Scientific classification
- Kingdom: Animalia
- Phylum: Arthropoda
- Class: Insecta
- Order: Lepidoptera
- Family: Crambidae
- Genus: Aulacodes
- Species: A. chalcialis

Binomial name
- Aulacodes chalcialis (Hampson, 1906)

Synonyms
- Parthenodes chalcialis Hampson, 1906

Species of moth

Aulacodes chalcialis is a species of moth in the family Crambidae. It was described by George Hampson in 1906. It is found in São Paulo, Brazil.
