= Nephopterix chryserythra =

Scientific classification
- Domain: Eukaryota
- Kingdom: Animalia
- Phylum: Arthropoda
- Class: Insecta
- Order: Lepidoptera
- Family: Pyralidae
- Genus: Nephopterix
- Species: N. chryserythra

Binomial name
- Nephopterix chryserythra (Lower, 1902)

Synonyms
- Nephopteryx chryserythra Lower, 1902

Species of moth

Nephopterix chryserythra is a species of snout moth in the genus Nephopterix. It was described by Oswald Bertram Lower in 1902 and is known from Australia, including Queensland.
