= Orthaga picta =

Scientific classification
- Kingdom: Animalia
- Phylum: Arthropoda
- Clade: Pancrustacea
- Class: Insecta
- Order: Lepidoptera
- Family: Pyralidae
- Genus: Orthaga
- Species: O. picta

Binomial name
- Orthaga picta (Warren, 1895)

Synonyms
- Stericta picta Warren, 1895; Orthaga percnodes Turner, 1905

Species of moth

Orthaga picta is a species of snout moth in the genus Orthaga. It was described by William Warren in 1895. It is found in Australia, including Queensland.
