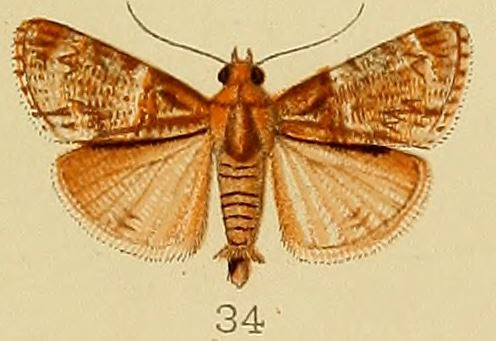

Scientific classification
- Kingdom: Animalia
- Phylum: Arthropoda
- Class: Insecta
- Order: Lepidoptera
- Family: Pyralidae
- Genus: Orthaga
- Species: O. chionalis

Binomial name
- Orthaga chionalis Hampson, 1906

Synonyms
- Orthaga chionalis Kenrick, 1907

= Orthaga chionalis =

Species of moth

Orthaga chionalis is a species of snout moth in the genus Orthaga. It is known from Singapore and New Guinea.
