= Marasmianympha =

Scientific classification
- Kingdom: Animalia
- Phylum: Arthropoda
- Clade: Pancrustacea
- Class: Insecta
- Order: Lepidoptera
- Family: Crambidae
- Subfamily: Spilomelinae
- Genus: Marasmianympha; Munroe, 1991
- Species: M. eupselias

Binomial name
- Marasmianympha eupselias (Meyrick, 1929)

Synonyms
- Aulacodes eupselias Meyrick, 1929

Genus of moths

Marasmianympha is a genus of moths of the grass moth family (Crambidae) described by Eugene G. Munroe in 1991. Its single species, Marasmianympha eupselias, was described by Edward Meyrick in 1929. Among the grass moths, it belongs to subfamily Spilomelinae. It is endemic to the Marquesas Islands of Polynesia, where it has been recorded on Fatu Hiva, Hiva Oa and Tahuata, but is suspected to occur on other islands as well. The holotype specimen is in the Natural History Museum, London.

When first described, this moth was assigned to the genus Aulacodes in subfamily Acentropinae (then known as Nymphulinae). But eventually it was determined that despite a superficial similarity, M. eupselias is not a member of the Acentropinae, and hence by grass moth standards not at all closely related to Aulacodes.

== Description and ecology ==
M. eupselias is a smallish moth with fairly short antennae. It resembles Aulacodes in having labial palps which do not project straightly and have a very much reduced third segment. In the hindwings, the third and fourth veins do not originate at the same point, and the sixth vein approaches the common stalk from which veins 7 and 8 originate.

The genitals can be used to reliably identify this species. In the male, the clasper's harpe is simple, with a slightly widened cucullus, and covered in long thin bristles. The uncus consists of two fingered processes which bear short thick bristles; the vinculum is triangular. The tegumen is almost square, and at the hind end of the upper side bears two groups of long, thick bristles; the anellus is small, flat, but notably sclerotized (hardened). The aedeagus is almost straight, robust, but not very long; the vesica bears two strong horns.

In the female, the ostium is V-shaped. The ductus seminalis insert from sideways and above, near the expanded forward end of the ductus bursae. The latter is sclerotized and on the underside has two conspicuous fingered processes. The bursa copulatrix has a fine-grained wall, and the signum is a small sclerotized cone.

Even though this moth was described almost a century ago and does not seem to be uncommon at least in the uplands of southern Fatu Hiva (where it has been collected numerous times), the ecology of this species is almost completely unknown. It is suspected to inhabit the more or less dense native woodland, and may have been driven to the uplands by deforestation for agriculture; the modern records of this species are generally from 600 m (c. 2000 ft) ASL to the mountain peaks. Plants that occur in its habitat are for example Bidens henryi, Cheirodendron bastardianum, Pandanus, and east Polynesian blueberry (Vaccinium cereum), as well as numerous other shrubs, ferns, mosses and lichens.
