= Aulacodes aechmialis =

Scientific classification
- Kingdom: Animalia
- Phylum: Arthropoda
- Class: Insecta
- Order: Lepidoptera
- Family: Crambidae
- Genus: Aulacodes
- Species: A. aechmialis

Binomial name
- Aulacodes aechmialis Guenée, 1854

Synonyms
- Aulacodes aeschmialis; Aulacodes oechmialis; Paraponyx bosoralis Druce, 1896; Hydrophysa plumipedalis Hampson, 1895

Species of moth

Aulacodes aechmialis is a species of moth in the family Crambidae. It was described by Achille Guenée in 1854. It is found in Panama, Honduras, Guatemala, Grenada and French Guiana.
