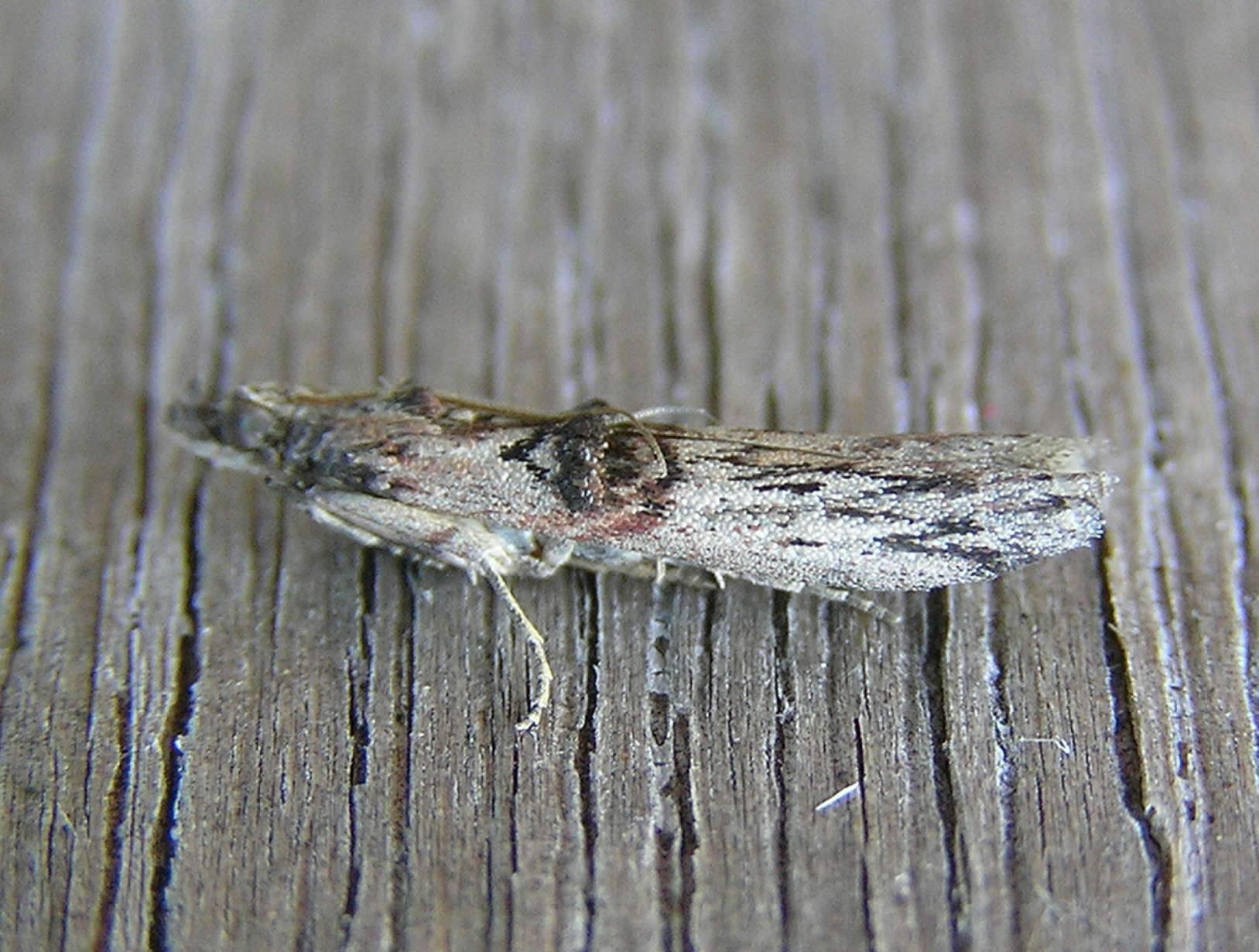

Scientific classification
- Kingdom: Animalia
- Phylum: Arthropoda
- Clade: Pancrustacea
- Class: Insecta
- Order: Lepidoptera
- Family: Pyralidae
- Genus: Nephopterix
- Species: N. angustella

Binomial name
- Nephopterix angustella (Hübner, 1796)

Synonyms
- Tinea angustella Hübner, 1796

= Nephopterix angustella =

Species of moth

Nephopterix angustella is a moth of the family Pyralidae described by Jacob Hübner in 1796. It is found in Europe.

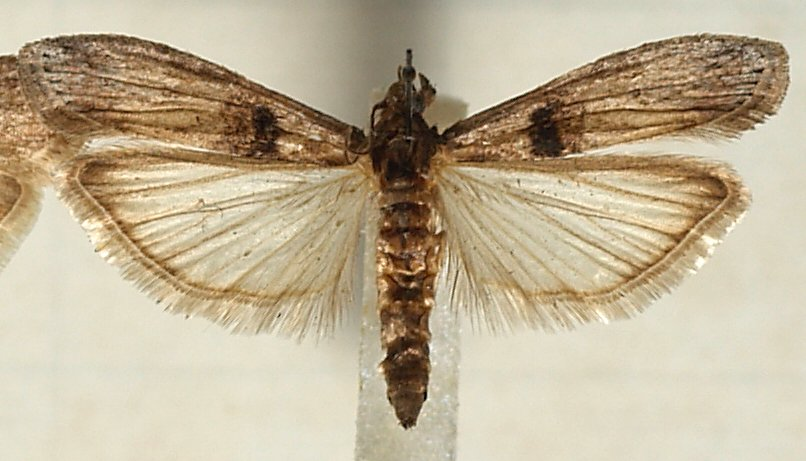

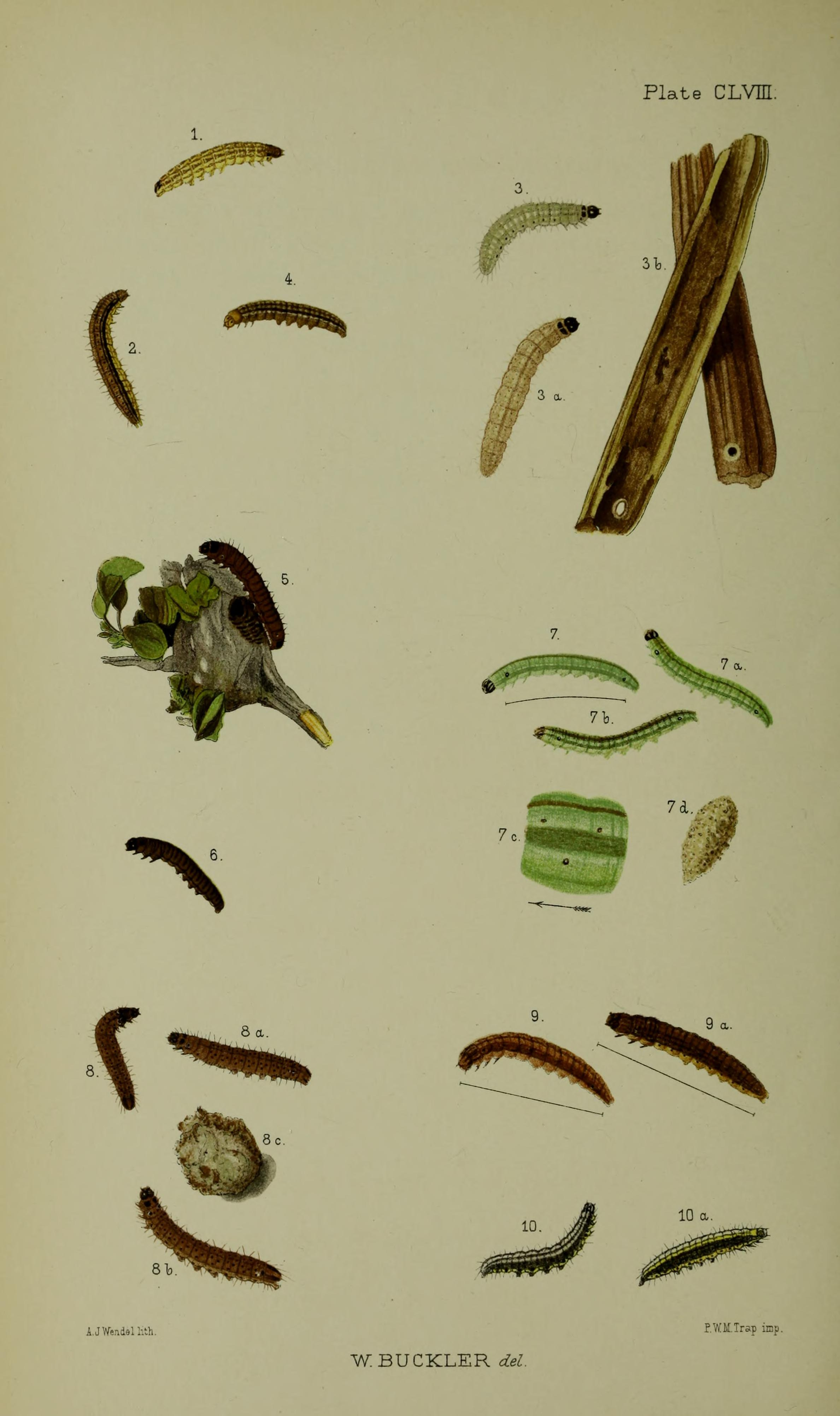
Fig.1 larva after final moult

The wingspan is 20–25 millimetres (0.8–1.0 in).The forewings are greyish ochreous, mixed with reddish-ochreous, somewhat sprinkled with ashy-whitish, ith a few black scales, tending to form short dashes in disc; a thick erect bar of blackish raised scales from dorsum before first line, reaching 3/4 across wing; first line faintly paler, obscurely reddish-edged; second obscure, marked with some short black dashes towards costa; some indistinct black terminal dots. Hindwings fuscous-whitish, termen fuscous. The larva is dull green or ochreous-yellow; dorsal line darker; lateral and more obscure spiracular series of ferruginous or purplish marks; head brown; 3 with black lateral spot: in berries of Euonymus

The moth flies from May to October depending on the location.

The larvae feed on bird cherry and Euonymus europaeus
