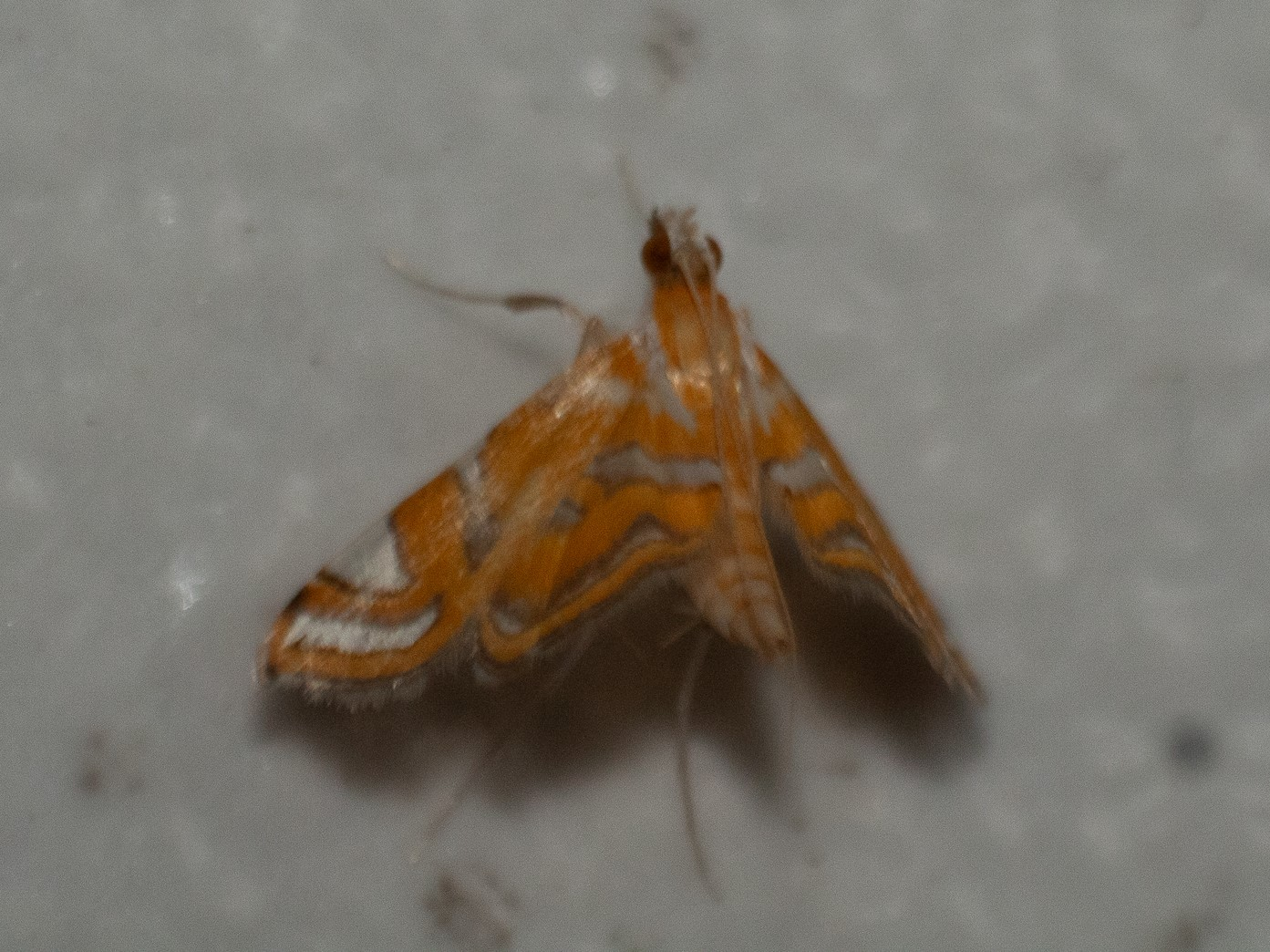

Scientific classification
- Kingdom: Animalia
- Phylum: Arthropoda
- Class: Insecta
- Order: Lepidoptera
- Family: Crambidae
- Genus: Aulacodes
- Species: A. exhibitalis

Binomial name
- Aulacodes exhibitalis (Walker, 1862)

Synonyms
- Oligostigma exhibitalis Walker, 1862

= Aulacodes exhibitalis =

Species of moth

Aulacodes exhibitalis is a species of moth in the family Crambidae. It was first described by Francis Walker in 1862. It is found in the Amazon basin.
