= Nephopterix concineratella =

Scientific classification
- Domain: Eukaryota
- Kingdom: Animalia
- Phylum: Arthropoda
- Class: Insecta
- Order: Lepidoptera
- Family: Pyralidae
- Genus: Nephopterix
- Species: N. concineratella

Binomial name
- Nephopterix concineratella Ragonot, 1887

Species of moth

Nephopterix concineratella is a species of snout moth in the genus Nephopterix. It was described by Émile Louis Ragonot in 1887. It is found in Central Asia (it was described in Tarbagatai).
