= Zeuzeropecten dargei =

Scientific classification
- Kingdom: Animalia
- Phylum: Arthropoda
- Clade: Pancrustacea
- Class: Insecta
- Order: Lepidoptera
- Family: Cossidae
- Genus: Zeuzeropecten
- Species: Z. dargei

Binomial name
- Zeuzeropecten dargei Yakovlev, 2011

Species of moth

Zeuzeropecten dargei is a species of moth of the family Cossidae. It is found in Tanzania.
