= Aulacodes templalis =

Scientific classification
- Kingdom: Animalia
- Phylum: Arthropoda
- Class: Insecta
- Order: Lepidoptera
- Family: Crambidae
- Genus: Aulacodes
- Species: A. templalis

Binomial name
- Aulacodes templalis Schaus, 1906

Synonyms
- Cataclysta templalis

Species of moth

Aulacodes templalis is a species of moth in the family Crambidae. It was described by Schaus in 1906. It is found in Brazil.
