= Orthaga rhodoptila =

Scientific classification
- Kingdom: Animalia
- Phylum: Arthropoda
- Class: Insecta
- Order: Lepidoptera
- Family: Pyralidae
- Genus: Orthaga
- Species: O. rhodoptila

Binomial name
- Orthaga rhodoptila (Meyrick, 1932)

Synonyms
- Balanotis rhodoptila Meyrick, 1932

Species of moth

Orthaga rhodoptila is a species of snout moth in the genus Orthaga. It is found in Sri Lanka.
