= Talanga advenalis =

Scientific classification
- Kingdom: Animalia
- Phylum: Arthropoda
- Class: Insecta
- Order: Lepidoptera
- Family: Crambidae
- Genus: Talanga
- Species: T. advenalis

Binomial name
- Talanga advenalis (Snellen, 1895)

Synonyms
- Glyphodes advenalis Snellen, 1895

Species of moth

Talanga advenalis is a moth of the family Crambidae. It was described by Snellen in 1895. It is found in Indonesia (Java).
