= Aulacodes scaralis =

Scientific classification
- Kingdom: Animalia
- Phylum: Arthropoda
- Class: Insecta
- Order: Lepidoptera
- Family: Crambidae
- Genus: Aulacodes
- Species: A. scaralis

Binomial name
- Aulacodes scaralis (Schaus, 1906)

Synonyms
- Cataclysta scaralis Schaus, 1906; Parthenodes scaralis; Aulacodes scalaris

Species of moth

Aulacodes scaralis is a species of moth in the family Crambidae. It was described by Schaus in 1906. It is found in Brazil.
