= Orthaga semieburnea =

Scientific classification
- Kingdom: Animalia
- Phylum: Arthropoda
- Class: Insecta
- Order: Lepidoptera
- Family: Pyralidae
- Genus: Orthaga
- Species: O. semieburnea

Binomial name
- Orthaga semieburnea Roepke, 1932

Species of moth

Orthaga semieburnea is a species of snout moth in the genus Orthaga. It is found on Sulawesi.
