= Aulacodes filigeralis =

Scientific classification
- Kingdom: Animalia
- Phylum: Arthropoda
- Class: Insecta
- Order: Lepidoptera
- Family: Crambidae
- Genus: Aulacodes
- Species: A. filigeralis

Binomial name
- Aulacodes filigeralis (Walker, 1866)

Synonyms
- Hydrocampa filigeralis Walker, 1866; Parthenodes filigeralis; Nymphula filigeralis

Species of moth

Aulacodes filigeralis is a species of moth in the family Crambidae. It was described by Francis Walker in 1866. It is found in Brazil.
