= Orthaga aenescens =

Scientific classification
- Domain: Eukaryota
- Kingdom: Animalia
- Phylum: Arthropoda
- Class: Insecta
- Order: Lepidoptera
- Family: Pyralidae
- Genus: Orthaga
- Species: O. aenescens

Binomial name
- Orthaga aenescens (Moore, 1888)

Synonyms
- Pannucha vicinalis Snellen, 1890; Pannucha aenescens Moore, 1888

Species of moth

Orthaga aenescens is a species of snout moth in the genus Orthaga. It is known from India (including Darjiling and Sikkim).

This species is olive-green, irrorated with black and has a wingspan of 30–32 mm.

== Biology ==
Known host-plants of this species are Litsea glutinosa and Cinnamomum sp. (Lauraceae).
