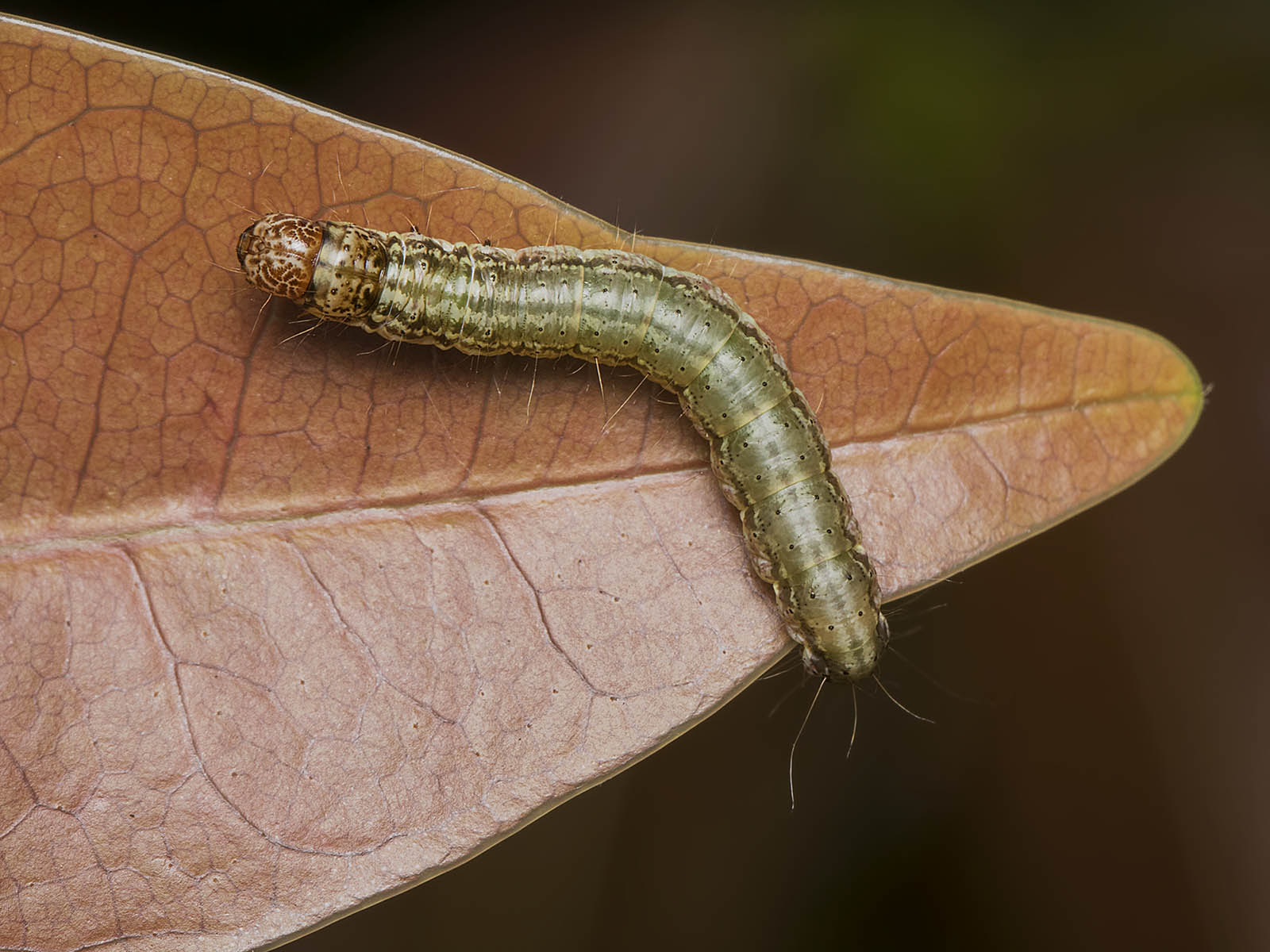

Scientific classification
- Kingdom: Animalia
- Phylum: Arthropoda
- Class: Insecta
- Order: Lepidoptera
- Family: Pyralidae
- Genus: Orthaga
- Species: O. exvinacea

Binomial name
- Orthaga exvinacea (Hampson, 1891)

Synonyms
- Balanotis exvinacea Hampson, 1891

= Orthaga exvinacea =

Species of moth

Orthaga exvinacea is a species of snout moth in the genus Orthaga. It is found in India (Nilgiris).
