= Aulacodes cervinalis =

Scientific classification
- Kingdom: Animalia
- Phylum: Arthropoda
- Class: Insecta
- Order: Lepidoptera
- Family: Crambidae
- Genus: Aulacodes
- Species: A. cervinalis

Binomial name
- Aulacodes cervinalis (Hampson, 1897)

Synonyms
- Aulacodes cervinalis Hampson, 1897; Aulacodes cervinalis distincta Rothschild, 1915; Eoophyla cervinalis Hampson, 1897

Species of moth

Aulacodes cervinalis is a species of moth in the family Crambidae. It was described by George Hampson in 1897. It is found in New Guinea.
