= Talanga lucretila =

Scientific classification
- Kingdom: Animalia
- Phylum: Arthropoda
- Class: Insecta
- Order: Lepidoptera
- Family: Crambidae
- Genus: Talanga
- Species: T. lucretila

Binomial name
- Talanga lucretila (C. Swinhoe, 1901)

Synonyms
- Margaronia lucretila C. Swinhoe, 1901

Species of moth

Talanga lucretila is a moth in the family Crambidae. It was described by Charles Swinhoe in 1901. It is found on the Solomon Islands.

The wings are pure white with a chestnut-brown band from the costa of forewings beyond the middle to the lower end of the cell, where it joins a similarly coloured narrower band which curves inwards from the costa near the apex and then extends to the hindmargin at two thirds from the base. The first band has a whitish line running through it, the second is followed by a whitish line and a broad marginal orange band with a whitish line dividing it. The hindwings have a large orange-brown patch in the centre of the disc, extending to the outer margin, containing a metallic blue band near its inner side, and three black spots on the margin, sprinkled with metallic blue scales.
