= Zeuzeropecten lecerfi =

Scientific classification
- Kingdom: Animalia
- Phylum: Arthropoda
- Class: Insecta
- Order: Lepidoptera
- Family: Cossidae
- Genus: Zeuzeropecten
- Species: Z. lecerfi

Binomial name
- Zeuzeropecten lecerfi (Viette, 1958)

Synonyms
- Duomitus lecerfi Viette, 1958

Species of moth

Zeuzeropecten lecerfi is a species of moth of the family Cossidae. It is found on Madagascar.

The larvae feed on Uncaria rhynchophylla.
