= Aulacodes citronalis =

Scientific classification
- Kingdom: Animalia
- Phylum: Arthropoda
- Class: Insecta
- Order: Lepidoptera
- Family: Crambidae
- Genus: Aulacodes
- Species: A. citronalis

Binomial name
- Aulacodes citronalis (H. Druce, 1896)

Synonyms
- Paraponyx citronalis H. Druce, 1896

Species of moth

Aulacodes citronalis is a species of moth in the family Crambidae. It was described by Herbert Druce in 1896. It is found in Mexico.
