= Talanga talangalis =

Scientific classification
- Kingdom: Animalia
- Phylum: Arthropoda
- Class: Insecta
- Order: Lepidoptera
- Family: Crambidae
- Genus: Talanga
- Species: T. talangalis

Binomial name
- Talanga talangalis (Hampson, 1899)

Synonyms
- Glyphodes talangalis Hampson, 1899

Species of moth

Talanga talangalis is a moth in the family Crambidae. It was described by George Hampson in 1899. It is found in the Loyalty Islands in the Pacific Ocean east of Australia.

The wingspan is about 26 mm. The forewings have a yellowish-white basal area, followed by an oblique antemedial rufous band extending along the costa to the base. There is also an oblique medial yellowish band and the terminal half is rufous with a wedge-shaped yellowish postmedial patch on the costa extending down to vein 1. There is also an opalescent-whitish discoidal lunule and two subterminal lines with orange between and beyond them. The hindwings are yellowish white, with a brown and orange subterminal band between veins 5 and 2 with opalescent colours before and beyond it. It is followed by a terminal yellow patch with two small black-centered and black-edged metallic-green terminal ocelli.
