= Aulacodes pulcherialis =

Scientific classification
- Kingdom: Animalia
- Phylum: Arthropoda
- Class: Insecta
- Order: Lepidoptera
- Family: Crambidae
- Genus: Aulacodes
- Species: A. pulcherialis

Binomial name
- Aulacodes pulcherialis (H. Druce, 1896)

Synonyms
- Cataclysta pulcherialis H. Druce, 1896

Species of moth

Aulacodes pulcherialis is a species of moth in the family Crambidae. It was described by Herbert Druce in 1896. It is found in Costa Rica.
