= Aulacodes cuprescens =

Scientific classification
- Kingdom: Animalia
- Phylum: Arthropoda
- Class: Insecta
- Order: Lepidoptera
- Family: Crambidae
- Genus: Aulacodes
- Species: A. cuprescens

Binomial name
- Aulacodes cuprescens (Hampson, 1912)

Synonyms
- Massepha cuprescens Hampson, 1912

Species of moth

Aulacodes cuprescens is a species of moth in the family Crambidae. It was described by George Hampson in 1912. It is found in São Paulo, Brazil.
