= Orthaga tritonalis =

Scientific classification
- Kingdom: Animalia
- Phylum: Arthropoda
- Class: Insecta
- Order: Lepidoptera
- Family: Pyralidae
- Genus: Orthaga
- Species: O. tritonalis

Binomial name
- Orthaga tritonalis (Walker, 1859)

Synonyms
- Pyralis tritonalis Walker, 1859; Orthaga rotundalis Walker, 1863

Species of moth

Orthaga tritonalis is a species of snout moth in the genus Orthaga. It was described by Francis Walker in 1859. It is found on Borneo.
