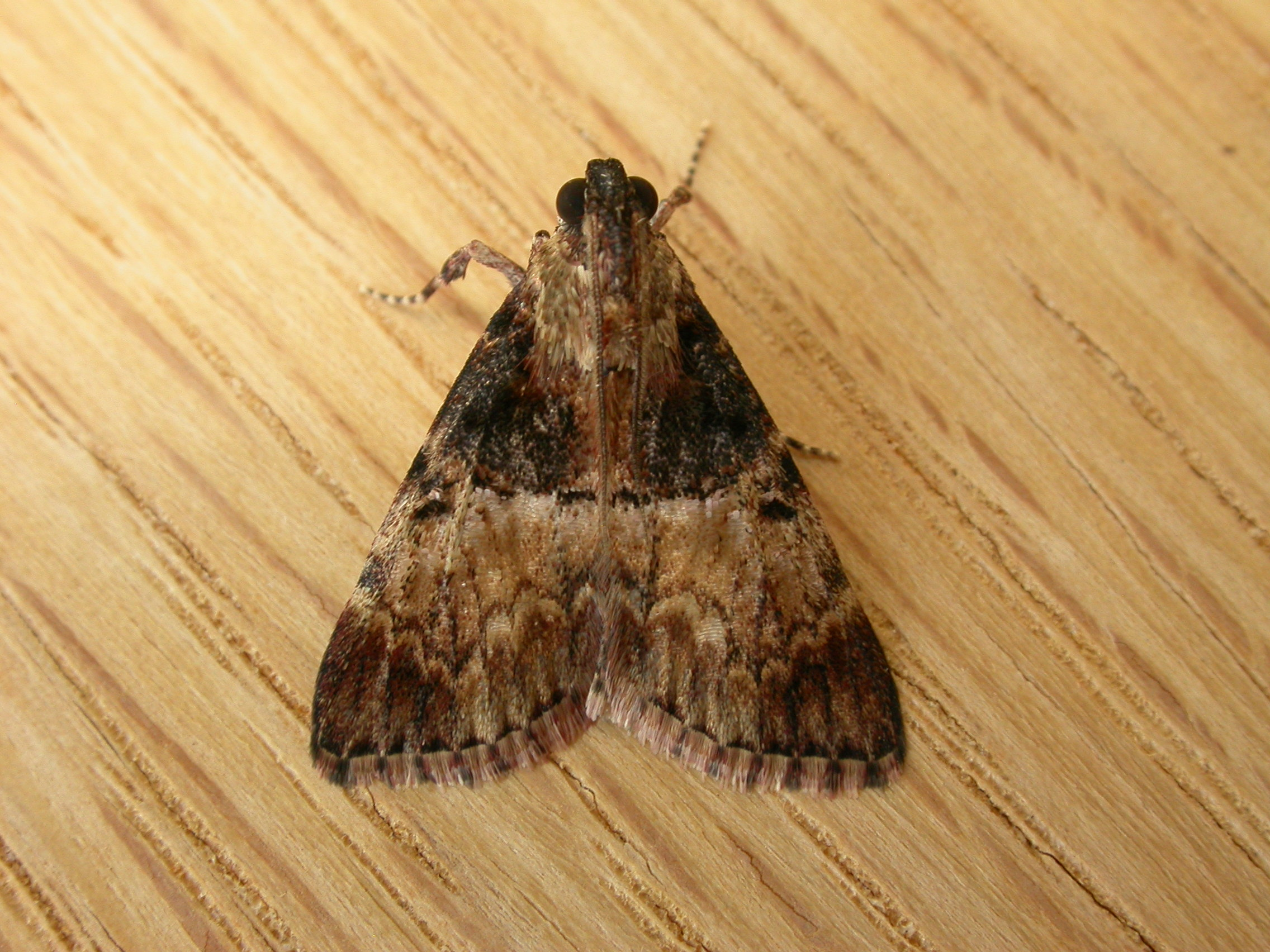

Scientific classification
- Kingdom: Animalia
- Phylum: Arthropoda
- Clade: Pancrustacea
- Class: Insecta
- Order: Lepidoptera
- Family: Pyralidae
- Genus: Orthaga
- Species: O. thyrisalis

Binomial name
- Orthaga thyrisalis (Walker, 1859)

Synonyms
- Bertula thyrisalis; Pyralis nigricalis; Catamola thyrisalis

= Orthaga thyrisalis =

Species of moth

Orthaga thyrisalis, also known as Teatree Web Moth, is a species of moth in the family Pyralidae. It is found throughout Australia and is a frequent pest of Callistemon plants.
