= Nephopterix habrostola =

Scientific classification
- Domain: Eukaryota
- Kingdom: Animalia
- Phylum: Arthropoda
- Class: Insecta
- Order: Lepidoptera
- Family: Pyralidae
- Genus: Nephopterix
- Species: N. habrostola

Binomial name
- Nephopterix habrostola Lower, 1905

Species of moth

Nephopterix habrostola is a species of snout moth in the genus Nephopterix. It was described by Oswald Bertram Lower in 1905 and is known from Australia, including Queensland.
