= Orthaga durranti =

Scientific classification
- Kingdom: Animalia
- Phylum: Arthropoda
- Clade: Pancrustacea
- Class: Insecta
- Order: Lepidoptera
- Family: Pyralidae
- Genus: Orthaga
- Species: O. durranti

Binomial name
- Orthaga durranti West, 1931

Species of moth

Orthaga durranti is a species of snout moth in the genus Orthaga. It is found in the Philippines.
