= Aulacodes delicata =

Scientific classification
- Kingdom: Animalia
- Phylum: Arthropoda
- Class: Insecta
- Order: Lepidoptera
- Family: Crambidae
- Genus: Aulacodes
- Species: A. delicata

Binomial name
- Aulacodes delicata Schaus, 1912

Species of moth

Aulacodes delicata is a species of moth in the family Crambidae. It was described by Schaus in 1912. It is found in Costa Rica.
