= Orthaga asbolaea =

Scientific classification
- Kingdom: Animalia
- Phylum: Arthropoda
- Class: Insecta
- Order: Lepidoptera
- Family: Pyralidae
- Genus: Orthaga
- Species: O. asbolaea

Binomial name
- Orthaga asbolaea (Meyrick, 1938)

Synonyms
- Catamola asbolaea Meyrick, 1938

Species of moth

Orthaga asbolaea is a species of snout moth in the genus Orthaga. It is known from Java, Indonesia.
