= Orthaga confusa =

Scientific classification
- Kingdom: Animalia
- Phylum: Arthropoda
- Class: Insecta
- Order: Lepidoptera
- Family: Pyralidae
- Genus: Orthaga
- Species: O. confusa

Binomial name
- Orthaga confusa Wileman & South, 1917

Species of moth

Orthaga confusa is a species of snout moth in the genus Orthaga. It is found in Taiwan.
