= Orthaga meyricki =

Scientific classification
- Kingdom: Animalia
- Phylum: Arthropoda
- Class: Insecta
- Order: Lepidoptera
- Family: Pyralidae
- Genus: Orthaga
- Species: O. meyricki

Binomial name
- Orthaga meyricki West, 1931

Species of moth

Orthaga meyricki is a species of snout moth in the genus Orthaga. It is found on the Philippines.
