= Orthaga onerata =

Scientific classification
- Domain: Eukaryota
- Kingdom: Animalia
- Phylum: Arthropoda
- Class: Insecta
- Order: Lepidoptera
- Family: Pyralidae
- Genus: Orthaga
- Species: O. onerata

Binomial name
- Orthaga onerata Butler, 1879

Synonyms
- Orthaga grisealis Wileman, 1911

Species of moth

Orthaga onerata is a species of snout moth in the genus Orthaga. It is found in Japan.
