= Orthaga rudis =

Scientific classification
- Kingdom: Animalia
- Phylum: Arthropoda
- Class: Insecta
- Order: Lepidoptera
- Family: Pyralidae
- Genus: Orthaga
- Species: O. rudis

Binomial name
- Orthaga rudis (Walker, 1862)

Synonyms
- Locastra rudis Walker, 1862

Species of moth

Orthaga rudis is a species of snout moth in the genus Orthaga. It was described by Francis Walker in 1862. It is found in India.
