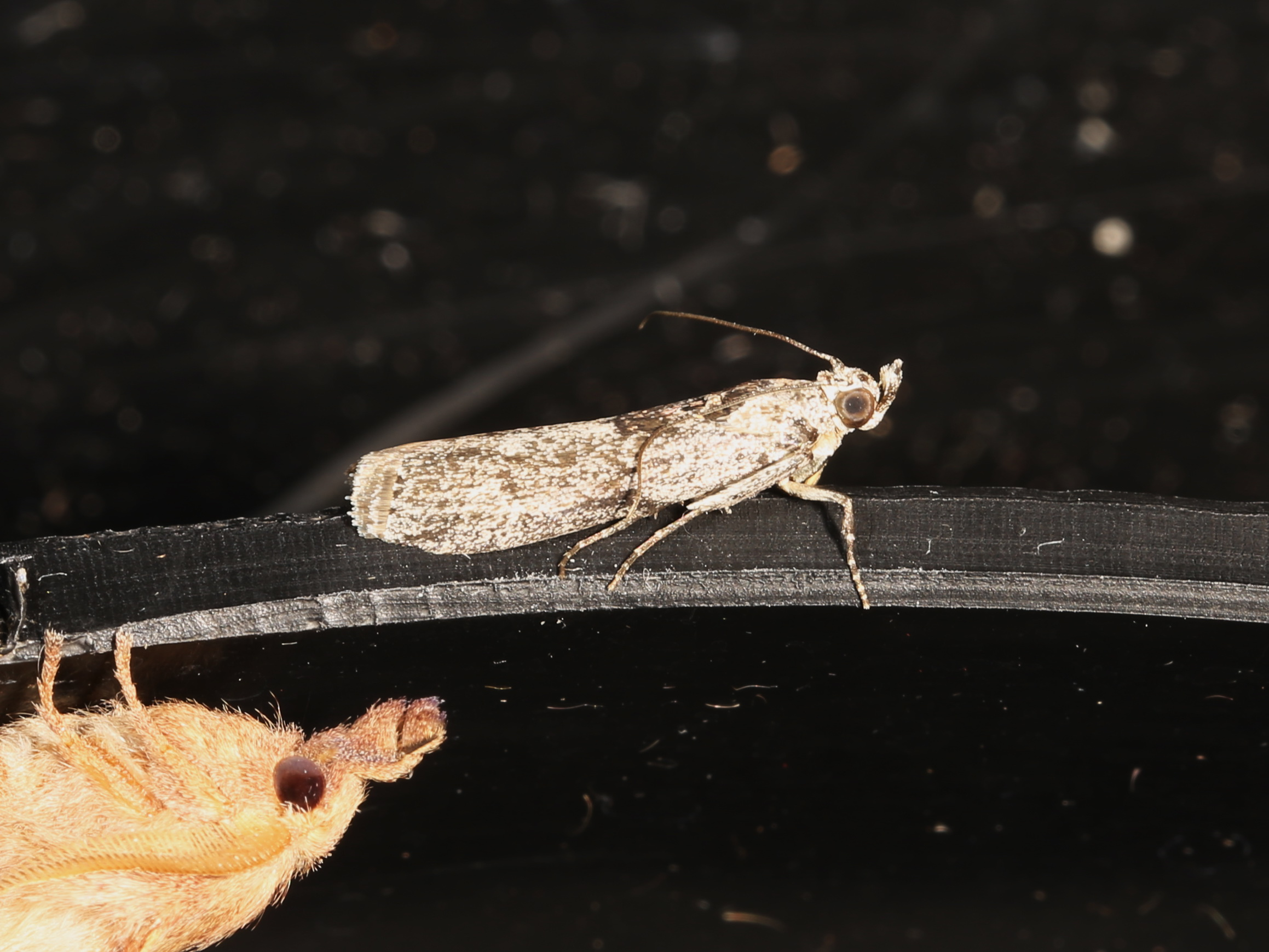

Scientific classification
- Kingdom: Animalia
- Phylum: Arthropoda
- Class: Insecta
- Order: Lepidoptera
- Family: Pyralidae
- Genus: Nephopterix
- Species: N. melanostyla

Binomial name
- Nephopterix melanostyla (Meyrick, 1879)

Synonyms
- Pempelia melanostyla Meyrick, 1879; Myelois flaveotincta Lucas, 1893

= Nephopterix melanostyla =

Species of moth

Nephopterix melanostyla is a species of snout moth in the genus Nephopterix. It was described by Edward Meyrick in 1879, and is known from Australia (including Parramatta, the type location).
