= Aulacodes traversalis =

Scientific classification
- Kingdom: Animalia
- Phylum: Arthropoda
- Class: Insecta
- Order: Lepidoptera
- Family: Crambidae
- Genus: Aulacodes
- Species: A. traversalis

Binomial name
- Aulacodes traversalis Dyar, 1914

Species of moth

Aulacodes traversalis is a species of moth in the family Crambidae. It was described by Harrison Gray Dyar Jr. in 1914. It is found in Panama.
