= Talanga pallidimargo =

Scientific classification
- Kingdom: Animalia
- Phylum: Arthropoda
- Class: Insecta
- Order: Lepidoptera
- Family: Crambidae
- Genus: Talanga
- Species: T. pallidimargo

Binomial name
- Talanga pallidimargo (de Joannis, 1929)

Synonyms
- Margaronia pallidimargo de Joannis, 1929

Species of moth

Talanga pallidimargo is a moth in the family Crambidae. It was described by Joseph de Joannis in 1929. It is found in Vietnam.
