= Aulacodes convoluta =

Scientific classification
- Kingdom: Animalia
- Phylum: Arthropoda
- Class: Insecta
- Order: Lepidoptera
- Family: Crambidae
- Genus: Aulacodes
- Species: A. convoluta

Binomial name
- Aulacodes convoluta Hampson, 1897

Species of moth

Aulacodes convoluta is a species of moth in the family Crambidae. It was described by George Hampson in 1897. It is found in the Amazon region.
