= Aulacodes pulchralis =

Scientific classification
- Kingdom: Animalia
- Phylum: Arthropoda
- Class: Insecta
- Order: Lepidoptera
- Family: Crambidae
- Genus: Aulacodes
- Species: A. pulchralis

Binomial name
- Aulacodes pulchralis (Rothschild, 1915)

Synonyms
- Aulacodes pulchralis Rothschild, 1915

Species of moth

Aulacodes pulchralis is a species of moth in the family Crambidae. It was described by Walter Rothschild in 1915. It is found in New Guinea.
