= Orthaga lithochroa =

Scientific classification
- Kingdom: Animalia
- Phylum: Arthropoda
- Clade: Pancrustacea
- Class: Insecta
- Order: Lepidoptera
- Family: Pyralidae
- Genus: Orthaga
- Species: O. lithochroa

Binomial name
- Orthaga lithochroa Hampson, 1916

Species of moth

Orthaga lithochroa is a species of snout moth in the genus Orthaga. It is found in Australia.
