= Zeuzeropecten altitudinis =

Scientific classification
- Kingdom: Animalia
- Phylum: Arthropoda
- Class: Insecta
- Order: Lepidoptera
- Family: Cossidae
- Genus: Zeuzeropecten
- Species: Z. altitudinis

Binomial name
- Zeuzeropecten altitudinis (Viette, 1957)

Synonyms
- Duomitus altitudinis Viette, 1957

Species of moth

Zeuzeropecten altitudinis is a species of moth of the family Cossidae. It is found on Madagascar.
