= Nephopterix scabida =

Scientific classification
- Kingdom: Animalia
- Phylum: Arthropoda
- Clade: Pancrustacea
- Class: Insecta
- Order: Lepidoptera
- Family: Pyralidae
- Genus: Nephopterix
- Species: N. scabida

Binomial name
- Nephopterix scabida Zeller, 1867

Species of moth

Nephopterix scabida is a species of snout moth in the genus Nephopterix. It was described by Philipp Christoph Zeller in 1867 and is known from Egypt.
