= Nephopterix ardesiifascia =

Scientific classification
- Domain: Eukaryota
- Kingdom: Animalia
- Phylum: Arthropoda
- Class: Insecta
- Order: Lepidoptera
- Family: Pyralidae
- Genus: Nephopterix
- Species: N. ardesiifascia

Binomial name
- Nephopterix ardesiifascia Rothschild, 1915

Species of moth

Nephopterix ardesiifascia is a species of snout moth in the genus Nephopterix. It was described by Walter Rothschild in 1915. It is found in Algeria.
