= Nephopterix thermalopha =

Scientific classification
- Domain: Eukaryota
- Kingdom: Animalia
- Phylum: Arthropoda
- Class: Insecta
- Order: Lepidoptera
- Family: Pyralidae
- Genus: Nephopterix
- Species: N. thermalopha

Binomial name
- Nephopterix thermalopha (Lower, 1903)

Synonyms
- Nephopteryx thermalopha Lower, 1903

Species of moth

Nephopterix thermalopha is a species of snout moth in the genus Nephopterix. It was described by Oswald Bertram Lower in 1903. It is found in Australia.
