= Aulacodes julittalis =

Scientific classification
- Kingdom: Animalia
- Phylum: Arthropoda
- Class: Insecta
- Order: Lepidoptera
- Family: Crambidae
- Genus: Aulacodes
- Species: A. julittalis

Binomial name
- Aulacodes julittalis Schaus, 1924

Species of moth

Aulacodes julittalis is a species of moth in the family Crambidae. It was described by Schaus in 1924. It is found in Panama.
