= Orthaga irrorata =

Scientific classification
- Kingdom: Animalia
- Phylum: Arthropoda
- Class: Insecta
- Order: Lepidoptera
- Family: Pyralidae
- Genus: Orthaga
- Species: O. irrorata

Binomial name
- Orthaga irrorata (Hampson, 1893)

Synonyms
- Balanotis irrorata Hampson, 1893

Species of moth

Orthaga irrorata is a species of snout moth in the genus Orthaga. It is found in Sri Lanka.
