= Orthaga disparoidalis =

Scientific classification
- Kingdom: Animalia
- Phylum: Arthropoda
- Class: Insecta
- Order: Lepidoptera
- Family: Pyralidae
- Genus: Orthaga
- Species: O. disparoidalis

Binomial name
- Orthaga disparoidalis Caradja, 1925

Species of moth

Orthaga disparoidalis is a species of snout moth in the genus Orthaga. It is found in China.
