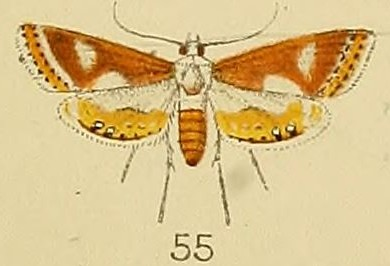
- Aulacodes lunalis

Scientific classification
- Domain: Eukaryota
- Kingdom: Animalia
- Phylum: Arthropoda
- Class: Insecta
- Order: Lepidoptera
- Family: Crambidae
- Subfamily: Acentropinae
- Genus: Aulacodes; Guenée, 1854

Synonyms
- Hydrophysa Guenée, 1854

= Aulacodes =

Genus of moths

Aulacodes is a genus of moths of the family Crambidae. The genus was first described by Achille Guenée in 1854.

== Species ==
- Aulacodes adiantealis (Walker, 1859)
- Aulacodes adjutrealis Schaus, 1924
- Aulacodes aechmialis Guenée, 1854
- Aulacodes bipunctalis Kenrick, 1907
- Aulacodes briocusalis (Schaus, 1924)
- Aulacodes caepiosalis (Walker, 1859)
- Aulacodes cervinalis (Hampson, 1897)
- Aulacodes chalcialis (Hampson, 1906)
- Aulacodes chionostola (Hampson, 1917)
- Aulacodes cilianalis (Schaus, 1924)
- Aulacodes citronalis (Druce, 1896)
- Aulacodes confusalis Schaus, 1906
- Aulacodes congallalis Schaus, 1924
- Aulacodes convoluta Hampson, 1897
- Aulacodes cuprescens (Hampson, 1912)
- Aulacodes delicata Schaus, 1912
- Aulacodes exhibitalis (Walker, 1862)
- Aulacodes filigeralis (Walker, 1866)
- Aulacodes fragmentalis (Lederer, 1863)
- Aulacodes gothicalis (C. Felder, R. Felder & Rogenhofer, 1875)
- Aulacodes halitalis (C. Felder, R. Felder & Rogenhofer, 1875)
- Aulacodes hodevalis (Druce, 1896)
- Aulacodes ilialis (Walker, 1859)
- Aulacodes julittalis Schaus, 1924
- Aulacodes lunalis Kenrick, 1907
- Aulacodes melanicalis (Hampson, 1917)
- Aulacodes mesoleucalis (Hampson, 1917)
- Aulacodes methodica Meyrick, 1936
- Aulacodes moralis Schaus, 1906
- Aulacodes obtusalis Dyar, 1914
- Aulacodes pampalis Schaus, 1906
- Aulacodes peribocalis (Walker, 1859)
- Aulacodes pulchralis (Rothschild, 1915)
- Aulacodes purpurealis Kenrick, 1907
- Aulacodes psyllalis (Guenée, 1854)
- Aulacodes pulcherialis (Druce, 1896)
- Aulacodes reversalis Dyar, 1914
- Aulacodes scaralis (Schaus, 1906)
- Aulacodes semicircularis Hampson, 1897
- Aulacodes templalis Schaus, 1906
- Aulacodes traversalis Dyar, 1914
- Aulacodes trigonalis (Hampson, 1906)

== Former species ==
- Aulacodes hamalis Snellen, 1875

Furthermore, "A." eupselias was erroneously assigned to this genus at first; it is actually not very closely related by grass moth standards and nowadays placed in the monotypic genus Marasmianympha.
