= Orthaga rubridiscalis =

Scientific classification
- Kingdom: Animalia
- Phylum: Arthropoda
- Class: Insecta
- Order: Lepidoptera
- Family: Pyralidae
- Genus: Orthaga
- Species: O. rubridiscalis

Binomial name
- Orthaga rubridiscalis Hampson, 1906

Species of moth

Orthaga rubridiscalis is a species of snout moth in the genus Orthaga. It is found in Australia and the Louisiade Archipelago.
