= Nephopterix kuznetzovi =

Scientific classification
- Domain: Eukaryota
- Kingdom: Animalia
- Phylum: Arthropoda
- Class: Insecta
- Order: Lepidoptera
- Family: Pyralidae
- Genus: Nephopterix
- Species: N. kuznetzovi

Binomial name
- Nephopterix kuznetzovi Harutiunian in Harutiunian, 1989

Species of snout moth

Nephopterix kuznetzovi is a species of snout moth in the genus Nephopterix. It was described by Harutiunian in 1989. It is found in Armenia.
