= Nephopterix capnoessa =

Scientific classification
- Domain: Eukaryota
- Kingdom: Animalia
- Phylum: Arthropoda
- Class: Insecta
- Order: Lepidoptera
- Family: Pyralidae
- Genus: Nephopterix
- Species: N. capnoessa

Binomial name
- Nephopterix capnoessa (Turner, 1904)

Synonyms
- Trissonca capnoessa Turner, 1904

Species of moth

Nephopterix capnoessa is a species of snout moth in the genus Nephopterix. It was described by Alfred Jefferis Turner in 1904 and is known from Australia, including New South Wales.
