= Orthaga vitialis =

Scientific classification
- Kingdom: Animalia
- Phylum: Arthropoda
- Class: Insecta
- Order: Lepidoptera
- Family: Pyralidae
- Genus: Orthaga
- Species: O. vitialis

Binomial name
- Orthaga vitialis (Walker, 1859)

Synonyms
- Pyralis vitialis Walker, 1859; Pyralis altusalis Walker, 1859; Pyralis helvialis Walker, 1859

Species of moth

Orthaga vitialis is a species of snout moth in the genus Orthaga. It was described by Francis Walker in 1859. It is found in Sri Lanka.
