= Orthaga fuliginosa =

Scientific classification
- Domain: Eukaryota
- Kingdom: Animalia
- Phylum: Arthropoda
- Class: Insecta
- Order: Lepidoptera
- Family: Pyralidae
- Genus: Orthaga
- Species: O. fuliginosa

Binomial name
- Orthaga fuliginosa (Rothschild, 1915)

Synonyms
- Polyphota fuliginosa Rothschild, 1915

Species of moth

Orthaga fuliginosa is a species of snout moth in the genus Orthaga. It is found in New Guinea.
