= Orthaga =

Scientific classification
- Kingdom: Animalia
- Phylum: Arthropoda
- Class: Insecta
- Order: Lepidoptera
- Family: Pyralidae
- Subfamily: Epipaschiinae
- Genus: Orthaga; Walker, 1859

Synonyms
- Edeta Walker, 1859; Hyperbalanotis Warren, 1891; Pannucha Moore, 1888; Proboscidophora Warren, 1891

Genus of moths

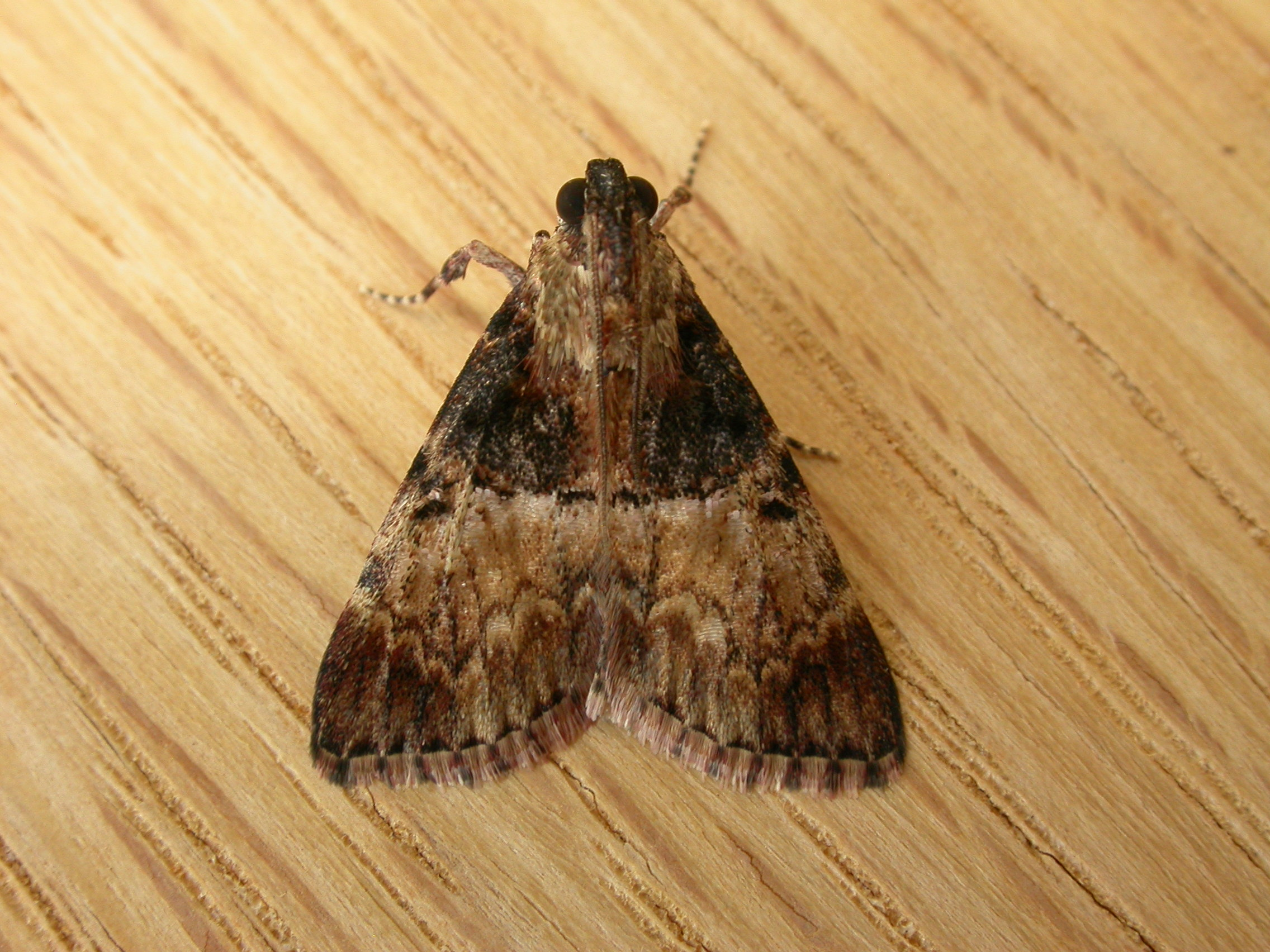
Orthaga thyrisalis

Orthaga is a genus of snout moths. It was described by Francis Walker in 1859.

== Species ==
- Orthaga achatina (Butler, 1878)
- Orthaga aenescens
- Orthaga amphimelas
- Orthaga asbolaea
- Orthaga auroviridalis
- Orthaga basalis (Moore, 1888)
- Orthaga bipartalis
- Orthaga castanealis Kenrick, 1907
- Orthaga chionalis Kenrick, 1907
- Orthaga columbalis
- Orthaga confusa
- Orthaga cryptochalcis de Joannis, 1927
- Orthaga disparoidalis
- Orthaga durranti
- Orthaga ecphoceana
- Orthaga edetalis Strand, 1919
- Orthaga erebochlaena
- Orthaga euadrusalis Walker, 1858
- Orthaga eumictalis
- Orthaga euryzona
- Orthaga exvinacea
- Orthaga fuliginosa
- Orthaga fumida
- Orthaga fuscofascialis Kenrick, 1907
- Orthaga haemarphoralis
- Orthaga hemileuca Hampson, 1916
- Orthaga icarusalis (Walker, 1859)
- Orthaga irrorata
- Orthaga leucatma
- Orthaga leucolophota
- Orthaga lithochroa
- Orthaga mangiferae
- Orthaga melanoperalis
- Orthaga meyricki
- Orthaga mixtalis
- Orthaga molleri
- Orthaga olivacea Warren, 1891
- Orthaga onerata
- Orthaga phaeopteralis Lower, 1902
- Orthaga picta (Warren, 1895)
- Orthaga polyscia (Turner, 1913)
- Orthaga rhodoptila
- Orthaga roseiplaga
- Orthaga rubridiscalis
- Orthaga rudis (Walker, 1862)
- Orthaga semialba
- Orthaga semieburnea
- Orthaga seminivea
- Orthaga subbasalis
- Orthaga thyrisalis Walker, 1859
- Orthaga tritonalis (Walker, 1859)
- Orthaga umbrimargo de Joannis, 1927
- Orthaga vitialis (Walker, 1859)
