= Orthaga mangiferae =

Scientific classification
- Domain: Eukaryota
- Kingdom: Animalia
- Phylum: Arthropoda
- Class: Insecta
- Order: Lepidoptera
- Family: Pyralidae
- Genus: Orthaga
- Species: O. mangiferae

Binomial name
- Orthaga mangiferae Misra., 1932

Species of moth

Orthaga mangiferae is a species of snout moth in the genus Orthaga. It is found in India.
