= Zeuzeropecten =

Scientific classification
- Kingdom: Animalia
- Phylum: Arthropoda
- Class: Insecta
- Order: Lepidoptera
- Family: Cossidae
- Subfamily: Zeuzerinae
- Genus: Zeuzeropecten; Gaede, 1929

Genus of moths

Zeuzeropecten is a genus of moths of the family Cossidae.

== Species ==
The species of this genus are:

- Zeuzeropecten altitudinis (Viette, 1958)
- Zeuzeropecten castaneus (Kenrick, 1914)
- Zeuzeropecten clenchi Yakovlev, 2011
- Zeuzeropecten combustus (Kenrick, 1914)
- Zeuzeropecten dargei Yakovlev, 2011
- Zeuzeropecten grandis (Viette, 1949)
- Zeuzeropecten lactescens Gaede, 1930
- Zeuzeropecten lecerfi (Viette, 1958)
- Zeuzeropecten occultoides (Kenrick, 1914)
- Zeuzeropecten tanzaniae Yakovlev, 2011
- Zeuzeropecten zambica Yakovlev, 2011
