= Nephopterix placoxantha =

Scientific classification
- Domain: Eukaryota
- Kingdom: Animalia
- Phylum: Arthropoda
- Class: Insecta
- Order: Lepidoptera
- Family: Pyralidae
- Genus: Nephopterix
- Species: N. placoxantha

Binomial name
- Nephopterix placoxantha (Lower, 1898)

Synonyms
- Salebria placoxantha Lower, 1898

Species of moth

Nephopterix placoxantha is a species of snout moth in the genus Nephopterix. It was described by Oswald Bertram Lower in 1898. It is found in Australia.
