= Orthaga polyscia =

Scientific classification
- Kingdom: Animalia
- Phylum: Arthropoda
- Clade: Pancrustacea
- Class: Insecta
- Order: Lepidoptera
- Family: Pyralidae
- Genus: Orthaga
- Species: O. polyscia

Binomial name
- Orthaga polyscia (Turner, 1913)

Synonyms
- Epipaschia polyscia Turner, 1913

Species of moth

Orthaga polyscia is a species of snout moth in the genus Orthaga. It was described by Turner in 1913. It is found in Australia.
