= Aulacodes fragmentalis =

Scientific classification
- Kingdom: Animalia
- Phylum: Arthropoda
- Class: Insecta
- Order: Lepidoptera
- Family: Crambidae
- Genus: Aulacodes
- Species: A. fragmentalis

Binomial name
- Aulacodes fragmentalis (Lederer, 1863)

Synonyms
- Parapoynx fragmentalis Lederer, 1863

Species of moth

Aulacodes fragmentalis is a species of moth in the family Crambidae. It was described by Julius Lederer in 1863. It is found in Venezuela.
