= Zeuzeropecten tanzaniae =

Scientific classification
- Kingdom: Animalia
- Phylum: Arthropoda
- Clade: Pancrustacea
- Class: Insecta
- Order: Lepidoptera
- Family: Cossidae
- Genus: Zeuzeropecten
- Species: Z. tanzaniae

Binomial name
- Zeuzeropecten tanzaniae Yakovlev, 2011

Species of moth

Zeuzeropecten tanzaniae is a species of moth of the family Cossidae. It is found in Tanzania.
