= Orthaga melanoperalis =

Scientific classification
- Kingdom: Animalia
- Phylum: Arthropoda
- Class: Insecta
- Order: Lepidoptera
- Family: Pyralidae
- Genus: Orthaga
- Species: O. melanoperalis

Binomial name
- Orthaga melanoperalis Hampson, 1906

Species of moth

Orthaga melanoperalis is a species of snout moth in the genus Orthaga. It is found on Borneo.
