= Nephopterix piratis =

Scientific classification
- Kingdom: Animalia
- Phylum: Arthropoda
- Class: Insecta
- Order: Lepidoptera
- Family: Pyralidae
- Genus: Nephopterix
- Species: N. piratis

Binomial name
- Nephopterix piratis (Meyrick, 1887)

Synonyms
- Tetralopha piratis Meyrick, 1887

Species of moth

Nephopterix piratis is a species of snout moth in the genus Nephopterix. It was described by Edward Meyrick in 1887. It is found in Australia.
