= Nephopterix bicolorella =

Scientific classification
- Domain: Eukaryota
- Kingdom: Animalia
- Phylum: Arthropoda
- Class: Insecta
- Order: Lepidoptera
- Family: Pyralidae
- Genus: Nephopterix
- Species: N. bicolorella

Binomial name
- Nephopterix bicolorella Leech, 1889

Species of moth

Nephopterix bicolorella is a species of snout moth in the genus Nephopterix. It was described by John Henry Leech in 1889. It is found in Japan and Korea.

The larvae feed on Populus and Salix species.
