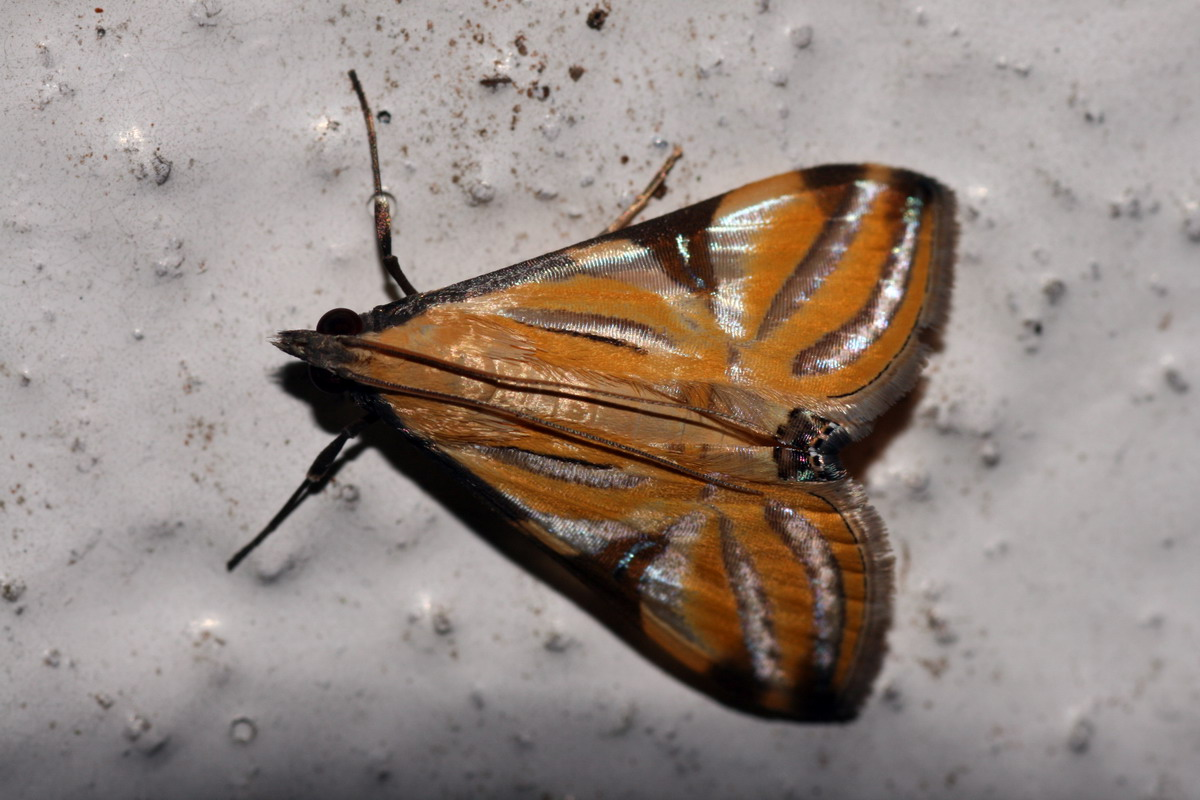

Scientific classification
- Kingdom: Animalia
- Phylum: Arthropoda
- Class: Insecta
- Order: Lepidoptera
- Family: Crambidae
- Genus: Talanga
- Species: T. sexpunctalis

Binomial name
- Talanga sexpunctalis (Moore, 1887)

Synonyms
- Oligostigma sexpunctalis Moore, 1887; Glyphodes lomaspilalis Snellen, 1880; Cataclysta nympha Butler, 1880; Talanga sexpunctata Moore, [1885] (missp.)

= Talanga sexpunctalis =

Species of moth

Talanga sexpunctalis is a species of moth in the family Crambidae described by Frederic Moore in 1887. It is found in South-east Asia, including India (Kolkata), China (Hong Kong), New Guinea, Thailand and Australia (Queensland).
