= Nephopterix hemibaphes =

Scientific classification
- Domain: Eukaryota
- Kingdom: Animalia
- Phylum: Arthropoda
- Class: Insecta
- Order: Lepidoptera
- Family: Pyralidae
- Genus: Nephopterix
- Species: N. hemibaphes

Binomial name
- Nephopterix hemibaphes (Turner, 1905)

Synonyms
- Hyphantidium hemibaphes Turner, 1905

Species of moth

Nephopterix hemibaphes is a species of snout moth in the genus Nephopterix. It was described by Alfred Jefferis Turner in 1905, and is known from Australia, including Tasmania.
