= Aulacodes semicircularis =

Scientific classification
- Kingdom: Animalia
- Phylum: Arthropoda
- Class: Insecta
- Order: Lepidoptera
- Family: Crambidae
- Genus: Aulacodes
- Species: A. semicircularis

Binomial name
- Aulacodes semicircularis Hampson, 1897

Species of moth

Aulacodes semicircularis is a species of moth in the family Crambidae. It was described by George Hampson in 1897. It is found in Espírito Santo, Brazil.
