= Zeuzeropecten castaneus =

Scientific classification
- Domain: Eukaryota
- Kingdom: Animalia
- Phylum: Arthropoda
- Class: Insecta
- Order: Lepidoptera
- Family: Cossidae
- Genus: Zeuzeropecten
- Species: Z. castaneus

Binomial name
- Zeuzeropecten castaneus (Kenrick, 1914)

Synonyms
- Cossus castaneus (Kenrick, 1914); Duomitus castaneus Kenrick, 1914; Azygophleps hova Le Cerf, 1919

Species of moth

Zeuzeropecten castaneus is a moth of the family Cossidae. It is found in Madagascar.

This is a large heavy moth with a wingspan of 70 mm (male). The frontwings are white, with chestnut reticulations, a faint post-median line, and another near the base. The hindwings are similar but duller.
