= Fanala =

Scientific classification
- Domain: Eukaryota
- Kingdom: Animalia
- Phylum: Arthropoda
- Class: Insecta
- Order: Lepidoptera
- Superfamily: Noctuoidea
- Family: Erebidae
- Tribe: Lymantriini
- Genus: Fanala; Griveaud, 1976
- Species: F. abbreviata

Binomial name
- Fanala abbreviata (Kenrick, 1914)

Genus of moths

Fanala is a monotypic moth genus in the subfamily Lymantriinae erected by Paul Griveaud in 1976. Its only species, Fanala abbreviata, was first described by George Hamilton Kenrick in 1914. It is found on Madagascar.
