= Zeuzeropecten lactescens =

Scientific classification
- Domain: Eukaryota
- Kingdom: Animalia
- Phylum: Arthropoda
- Class: Insecta
- Order: Lepidoptera
- Family: Cossidae
- Genus: Zeuzeropecten
- Species: Z. lactescens

Binomial name
- Zeuzeropecten lactescens Gaede, 1930

Species of moth

Zeuzeropecten lactescens is a species of moth of the family Cossidae. It is found on Madagascar.
