= Orthaga basalis =

Scientific classification
- Domain: Eukaryota
- Kingdom: Animalia
- Phylum: Arthropoda
- Class: Insecta
- Order: Lepidoptera
- Family: Pyralidae
- Genus: Orthaga
- Species: O. basalis

Binomial name
- Orthaga basalis (Moore, 1888)

Synonyms
- Pannucha basalis Moore, 1888

Species of moth

Orthaga basalis is a species of snout moth in the genus Orthaga. It was described by Frederic Moore in 1888 and is known from India (including Darjiling).
