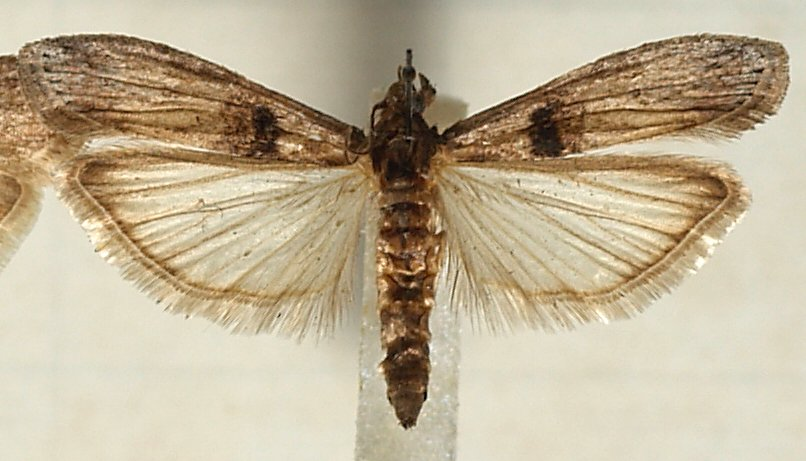

Scientific classification
- Kingdom: Animalia
- Phylum: Arthropoda
- Clade: Pancrustacea
- Class: Insecta
- Order: Lepidoptera
- Family: Pyralidae
- Tribe: Phycitini
- Genus: Nephopterix; Hübner, 1825

Synonyms
- Alispa Zeller, 1848; Nephopteryx Zeller, 1839

= Nephopterix =

Genus of moths

Nephopterix is a genus of moths of the family Pyralidae erected by Jacob Hübner in 1825.

== Species ==
- Nephopterix albovariegata Rothschild, 1915
- Nephopterix angustella (Hübner, 1796)
- Nephopterix ardesiifascia Rothschild, 1915
- Nephopterix bicolorella Leech, 1889
- Nephopterix capnoessa (Turner, 1904)
- Nephopterix cleopatrella Ragonot, 1887
- Nephopterix chryserythra (Lower, 1902)
- Nephopterix cometella de Joannis, 1927
- Nephopterix concineratella Ragonot, 1887
- Nephopterix furella (Strand 1918)
- Nephopterix fuscalis (Kenrick, 1907)
- Nephopterix griseola Rothschild, 1915
- Nephopterix habrostola (Lower, 1905)
- Nephopterix hajastanica Harutiunian, 1989
- Nephopterix hastiferella Ragonot, 1887
- Nephopterix hemibaphes (Turner, 1905)
- Nephopterix kuznetzovi Harutiunian in Harutiunian, 1989
- Nephopterix lateritialis Walker, 1863
- Nephopterix melanostyla (Meyrick, 1879)
- Nephopterix nocticolorella Ragonot, 1887
- Nephopterix obscuribasella Ragonot, 1887
- Nephopterix piratis (Meyrick, 1887)
- Nephopterix placoxantha (Lower, 1898)
- Nephopterix scabida Zeller, 1867
- Nephopterix thermalopha (Lower, 1903)
