= Aulacodes adiantealis =

Scientific classification
- Kingdom: Animalia
- Phylum: Arthropoda
- Class: Insecta
- Order: Lepidoptera
- Family: Crambidae
- Genus: Aulacodes
- Species: A. adiantealis

Binomial name
- Aulacodes adiantealis (Walker, 1859)

Synonyms
- Hydrophysa adiantealis Walker, 1859; Nymphula adiantealis

Species of moth

Aulacodes adiantealis is a species of moth in the family Crambidae. It was described by Francis Walker in 1859. It is found in Rio de Janeiro, Brazil.
