= Aulacodes peribocalis =

Scientific classification
- Kingdom: Animalia
- Phylum: Arthropoda
- Class: Insecta
- Order: Lepidoptera
- Family: Crambidae
- Genus: Aulacodes
- Species: A. peribocalis

Binomial name
- Aulacodes peribocalis (Walker, 1859)

Synonyms
- Cataclysta peribocalis Walker, 1859; Oligostigma papulalis Snellen, 1890

Species of moth

Aulacodes peribocalis is a species of moth in the family Crambidae. It was described by Francis Walker in 1859. It is found in Yemen and India.
