= Orthaga hemileuca =

Scientific classification
- Kingdom: Animalia
- Phylum: Arthropoda
- Class: Insecta
- Order: Lepidoptera
- Family: Pyralidae
- Genus: Orthaga
- Species: O. hemileuca

Binomial name
- Orthaga hemileuca Hampson, 1916

Species of moth

Orthaga hemileuca is a species of snout moth in the genus Orthaga. It was described by George Hampson in 1916. It is found on New Guinea.
