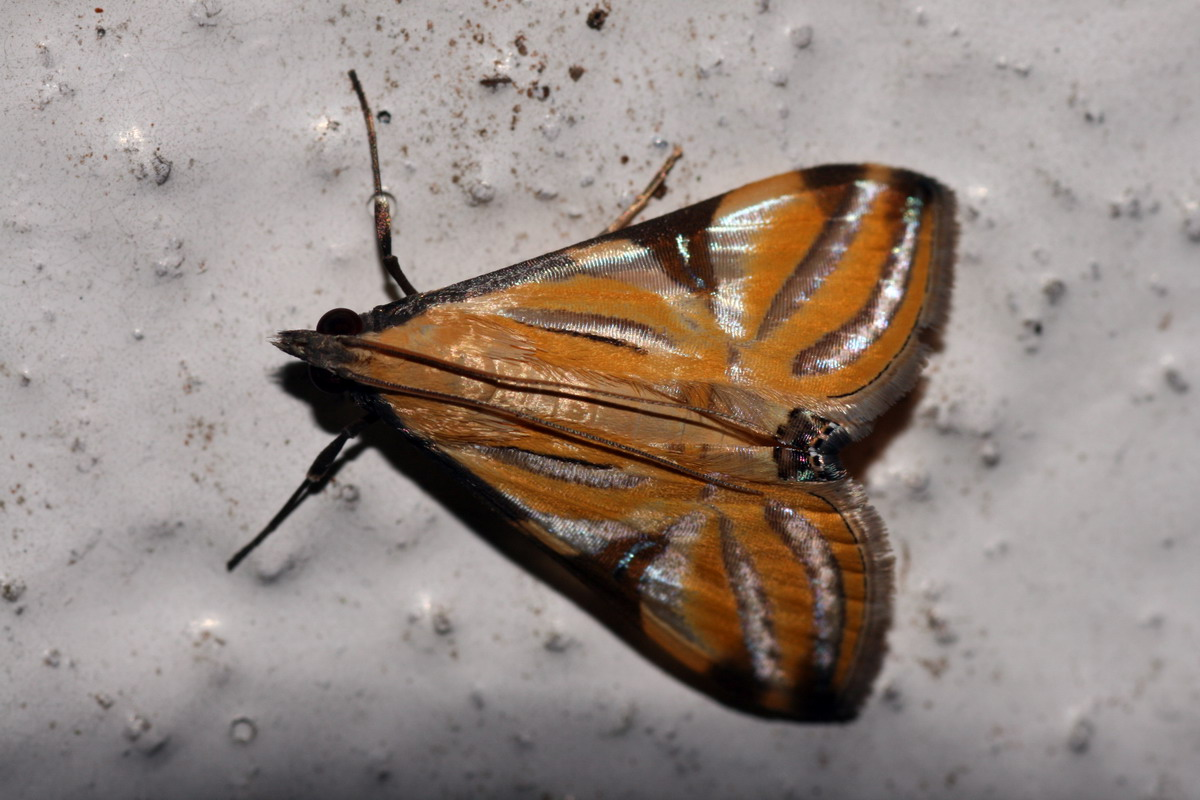
- Talanga sexpunctalis

Scientific classification
- Kingdom: Animalia
- Phylum: Arthropoda
- Class: Insecta
- Order: Lepidoptera
- Family: Crambidae
- Tribe: Margaroniini
- Genus: Talanga; Moore, 1885

= Talanga (moth) =

Genus of moths

Talanga is a genus of moths of the family Crambidae described by Frederic Moore in 1885.

== Species ==
- Talanga advenalis (Snellen, 1895)
- Talanga exquisitalis Kenrick, 1907
- Talanga iridomelaena Munroe, 1968
- Talanga lucretila (C. Swinhoe, 1901)
- Talanga nubilosa Munroe, 1968
- Talanga pallidimargo (de Joannis, 1929)
- Talanga quadristigmalis Kenrick, 1907
- Talanga sabacusalis (Walker, 1859)
- Talanga sexpunctalis (Moore, 1877)
- Talanga talangalis (Hampson, 1899)
- Talanga tolumnialis (Walker, 1859)
