= Orthaga mixtalis =

Scientific classification
- Kingdom: Animalia
- Phylum: Arthropoda
- Class: Insecta
- Order: Lepidoptera
- Family: Pyralidae
- Genus: Orthaga
- Species: O. mixtalis

Binomial name
- Orthaga mixtalis (Walker, 1863)

Synonyms
- Stericta mixtalis Walker, 1863

Species of moth

Orthaga mixtalis is a species of snout moth in the genus Orthaga. It is found on Borneo.
