= Aulacodes methodica =

Scientific classification
- Kingdom: Animalia
- Phylum: Arthropoda
- Class: Insecta
- Order: Lepidoptera
- Family: Crambidae
- Genus: Aulacodes
- Species: A. methodica

Binomial name
- Aulacodes methodica Meyrick, 1936

Species of moth

Aulacodes methodica is a species of moth in the family Crambidae. It was described by Edward Meyrick in 1917. It is found in Peru.
