= Orthaga fumida =

Scientific classification
- Kingdom: Animalia
- Phylum: Arthropoda
- Class: Insecta
- Order: Lepidoptera
- Family: Pyralidae
- Genus: Orthaga
- Species: O. fumida

Binomial name
- Orthaga fumida (Hering, 1901)

Synonyms
- Pannucha fumida Hering, 1901

Species of moth

Orthaga fumida is a species of snout moth in the genus Orthaga. It is found on Sumatra.
