= Orthaga cryptochalcis =

Scientific classification
- Domain: Eukaryota
- Kingdom: Animalia
- Phylum: Arthropoda
- Class: Insecta
- Order: Lepidoptera
- Family: Pyralidae
- Genus: Orthaga
- Species: O. cryptochalcis

Binomial name
- Orthaga cryptochalcis de Joannis, 1927

Species of moth

Orthaga cryptochalcis is a species of snout moth, family Pyralidae. It was described by Joseph de Joannis in 1927. It is found in Mozambique.
