= Orthaga icarusalis =

Scientific classification
- Kingdom: Animalia
- Phylum: Arthropoda
- Class: Insecta
- Order: Lepidoptera
- Family: Pyralidae
- Genus: Orthaga
- Species: O. icarusalis

Binomial name
- Orthaga icarusalis (Walker, 1859)

Synonyms
- Edeta icarusalis Walker, 1859

Species of moth

Orthaga icarusalis is a species of snout moth in the genus Orthaga. It was described by Francis Walker in 1859. It is found on Borneo.
