= Aulacodes pampalis =

Scientific classification
- Kingdom: Animalia
- Phylum: Arthropoda
- Class: Insecta
- Order: Lepidoptera
- Family: Crambidae
- Genus: Aulacodes
- Species: A. pampalis

Binomial name
- Aulacodes pampalis Schaus, 1906

Synonyms
- Parthenodes pampalis

Species of moth

Aulacodes pampalis is a species of moth in the family Crambidae. It was described by Schaus in 1906. It is found in Brazil.
