= Orthaga edetalis =

Scientific classification
- Kingdom: Animalia
- Phylum: Arthropoda
- Class: Insecta
- Order: Lepidoptera
- Family: Pyralidae
- Genus: Orthaga
- Species: O. edetalis

Binomial name
- Orthaga edetalis Strand, 1919

Species of moth

Orthaga edetalis is a species of snout moth in the genus Orthaga. It was described by Strand in 1919. It is found in Taiwan.
