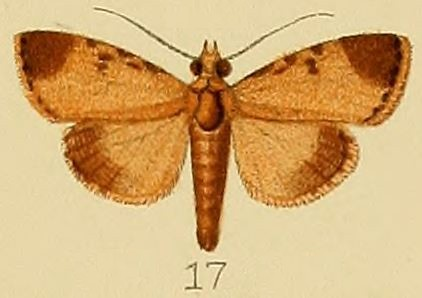

Scientific classification
- Domain: Eukaryota
- Kingdom: Animalia
- Phylum: Arthropoda
- Class: Insecta
- Order: Lepidoptera
- Family: Pyralidae
- Genus: Orthaga
- Species: O. phaeopteralis

Binomial name
- Orthaga phaeopteralis Lower, 1902

Synonyms
- Macalla curtulalis Kenrick, 1907

= Orthaga phaeopteralis =

Species of moth

Orthaga phaeopteralis is a species of snout moth in the genus Orthaga. It was described by Oswald Bertram Lower in 1902. It is found in Australia (including Queensland) and Papua New Guinea.
