= Aulacodes psyllalis =

Scientific classification
- Kingdom: Animalia
- Phylum: Arthropoda
- Class: Insecta
- Order: Lepidoptera
- Family: Crambidae
- Genus: Aulacodes
- Species: A. psyllalis

Binomial name
- Aulacodes psyllalis (Guenée, 1854)

Synonyms
- Hydrophysa psyllalis Guenée, 1854; Hydrocampa tortalis Lederer, 1863; Oligostigma scuthesalis Walker, 1859

Species of moth

Aulacodes psyllalis is a species of moth in the family Crambidae. It was described by Achille Guenée in 1854. It is found in Venezuela and Brazil.
