= Orthaga bipartalis =

Scientific classification
- Kingdom: Animalia
- Phylum: Arthropoda
- Class: Insecta
- Order: Lepidoptera
- Family: Pyralidae
- Genus: Orthaga
- Species: O. bipartalis

Binomial name
- Orthaga bipartalis Hampson, 1906

Species of moth

Orthaga bipartalis is a species of snout moth in the genus Orthaga. It is known from Singapore.
