= Nephopterix cleopatrella =

Scientific classification
- Kingdom: Animalia
- Phylum: Arthropoda
- Class: Insecta
- Order: Lepidoptera
- Family: Pyralidae
- Genus: Nephopterix
- Species: N. cleopatrella

Binomial name
- Nephopterix cleopatrella Ragonot, 1887

Species of moth

Nephopterix cleopatrella is a species of snout moth, family Pyralidae. It was described by Émile Louis Ragonot in 1887. It is found in Tunisia (Gabès) and Algeria.

The wingspan is 25 mm (0.98 in) in males and 23 mm (0.91 in) in females.
