= Zeuzeropecten clenchi =

Scientific classification
- Kingdom: Animalia
- Phylum: Arthropoda
- Clade: Pancrustacea
- Class: Insecta
- Order: Lepidoptera
- Family: Cossidae
- Genus: Zeuzeropecten
- Species: Z. clenchi

Binomial name
- Zeuzeropecten clenchi Yakovlev, 2011

Species of moth

Zeuzeropecten clenchi is a species of moth of the family Cossidae. It is found in the Democratic Republic of the Congo.
