= Talanga sabacusalis =

Scientific classification
- Kingdom: Animalia
- Phylum: Arthropoda
- Class: Insecta
- Order: Lepidoptera
- Family: Crambidae
- Genus: Talanga
- Species: T. sabacusalis

Binomial name
- Talanga sabacusalis (Walker, 1859)

Synonyms
- Glyphodes sabacusalis Walker, 1859; Glyphodes dilectalis Snellen, 1895

Species of moth

Talanga sabacusalis is a moth in the family Crambidae. It was described by Francis Walker in 1859. It is found on Borneo, Java, Sumatra, Sulawesi and in Papua New Guinea, Cambodia, the Philippines, as well as Australia, where it has been recorded from Queensland.
