= Zeuzeropecten grandis =

Scientific classification
- Kingdom: Animalia
- Phylum: Arthropoda
- Class: Insecta
- Order: Lepidoptera
- Family: Cossidae
- Genus: Zeuzeropecten
- Species: Z. grandis

Binomial name
- Zeuzeropecten grandis (Viette, 1951)

Synonyms
- Phragmataecia grandis Viette, 1951

Species of moth

Zeuzeropecten grandis is a species of moth of the family Cossidae. It is found on Madagascar.
