= Nephopterix cometella =

Scientific classification
- Kingdom: Animalia
- Phylum: Arthropoda
- Clade: Pancrustacea
- Class: Insecta
- Order: Lepidoptera
- Family: Pyralidae
- Genus: Nephopterix
- Species: N. cometella

Binomial name
- Nephopterix cometella de Joannis, 1927

Species of moth

Nephopterix cometella is a species of snout moth in the genus Nephopterix. It was described by Joseph de Joannis in 1927. It is found in Mozambique.
