= Talanga nubilosa =

Scientific classification
- Kingdom: Animalia
- Phylum: Arthropoda
- Class: Insecta
- Order: Lepidoptera
- Family: Crambidae
- Genus: Talanga
- Species: T. nubilosa

Binomial name
- Talanga nubilosa Munroe, 1968

Species of moth

Talanga nubilosa is a moth in the family Crambidae. It was described by Eugene G. Munroe in 1968. It is found in Papua New Guinea.
