= Aulacodes halitalis =

Scientific classification
- Kingdom: Animalia
- Phylum: Arthropoda
- Class: Insecta
- Order: Lepidoptera
- Family: Crambidae
- Genus: Aulacodes
- Species: A. halitalis

Binomial name
- Aulacodes halitalis (C. Felder, R. Felder & Rogenhofer, 1875)

Synonyms
- Parapoynx halitalis C. Felder, R. Felder & Rogenhofer, 1875; Aulacodes habitalis

Species of moth

Aulacodes halitalis is a species of moth in the family Crambidae. It was described by Cajetan Felder, Rudolf Felder and Alois Friedrich Rogenhofer in 1875. It is found in Amazonas, Brazil.
