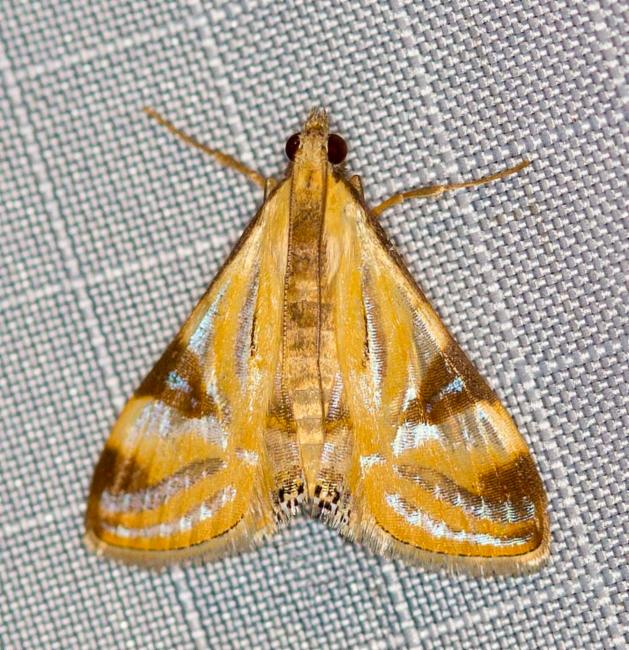

Scientific classification
- Kingdom: Animalia
- Phylum: Arthropoda
- Class: Insecta
- Order: Lepidoptera
- Family: Crambidae
- Genus: Talanga
- Species: T. tolumnialis

Binomial name
- Talanga tolumnialis (Walker, 1859)

Synonyms
- Leucochroma tolumnialis Walker, 1859

= Talanga tolumnialis =

Species of moth

Talanga tolumnialis, the figleaf moth, is a moth in the family Crambidae. It was described by Francis Walker in 1859. It is found in Papua New Guinea and Australia, where it has been recorded from the Northern Territory, Queensland and New South Wales.

== Subspecies ==
- Talanga tolumnialis tolumnialis
- Talanga tolumnialis major Rothschild, 1915 (Papua New Guinea)
