= George Hamilton Kenrick =

English entomologist (1850–1939)

Sir George Hamilton Kenrick FRES
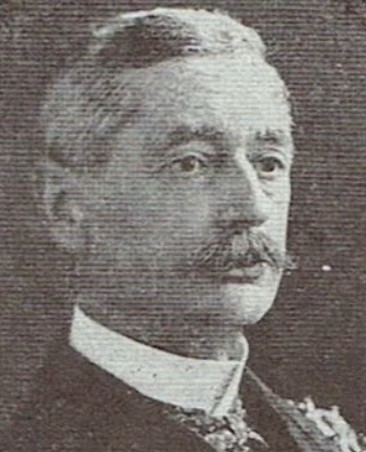
- Born: 29 January 1850; Edgbaston, Birmingham, England
- Died: 28 May 1939 (aged 89); Edgbaston, Birmingham
- Education: University College, London
- Occupations: Entomologist, Lord Mayor of Birmingham
- Known for: Lepidoptery

Sir George Hamilton Kenrick FRES (29 January 1850 – 28 May 1939) was an English entomologist who specialised in Lepidoptera especially those of New Guinea. He was a prominent liberal educationist and was a councillor in Birmingham.

== Life ==
Kenrick was born in 1850. He was the son of Timothy Kenrick from Edgbaston and the grandson of Archibald Kenrick, founder of the cutlery firm Archibald Kenrick & Sons in West Bromwich. After completing his education in Brighton and at University College, London, he worked for two years as an engineer at Nettlefolds in Smethwick, where his brother was a director. He then joined his father's company, where he was chairman for many years.

Kenrick engaged with the local primary and higher education policy and at the age of 30 he became a member of the school board in Birmingham after the resignation of Dr Dale. He promoted physical training in schools and promoted sports setting up a Kenrick Shield in 1883. In 1908, he served for a year as Lord Mayor of Birmingham.

His collection of world butterflies and moths is in Birmingham Museum & Art Gallery, except the types which are in the Natural History Museum, London.

At the beginning of the 20th century Kenrick began writing about tropical butterflies. He sent the naturalist Antwerp Edgar Pratt and his two sons, Carl Brenders Pratt and Felix Biet Pratt 1902–1903 to the British part of New Guinea and from 1909 to 1910 into Arfak Mountains to Dutch New Guinea. Both expeditions, in which hundreds of new species of butterfly (including the Birdwing Ornithoptera rothschildi) were discovered, were very successful. In the 1930s, Kenrick sold his butterfly collection to the Birmingham Natural History Museum. Kenrick was a Fellow of the Royal Entomological Society (FRES).

Kenrick was knighted by King Edward VII in 1909, during a royal visit to Birmingham, while he was Lord Mayor.

== Publications ==
- (1907) A list of moths of the family Pyralidae collected by A.E. Pratt in British New Guinea in 1902–3, with descriptions of new species. Proceedings of the Zoological Society of London 1907: 68–87
- (1909) Descriptions of some new species of the genus Delias from North New Guinea, recently collected by Mr. C. E. Pratt. - Annals and Magazine of Natural History (series 8) 4: 176–183, pis 6, 7.
- (1911) Some undescribed Butterflies from Dutch New Guinea Trans. ent. Soc. Lond. 1911 (1): 16–20, pl. 3-4 .
- (1912) A List of Moths of the Family Pyralidae collected by Felix B.Pratt and Charles B. Pratt in Dutch New Guinea in 1909–1910; with Descriptions of new Species. - Proc. of the Zoological Soc. of London 1912 (2): 546–555, pl.68
- (1914a) New or little known Heterocera from Madagascar. - Transactions of the entomological Society of London 1913(4):587–602, pls. 31–32.
- (1917) New or little-known Heterocera from Madagascar. - Transactions of the entomological Society of London 1917:85–101, pls. 1–6.

== Sources ==
- Anonym 1939: [Kenrick, G. H.] Entomologist's Record & Journal of Variation 51 116
