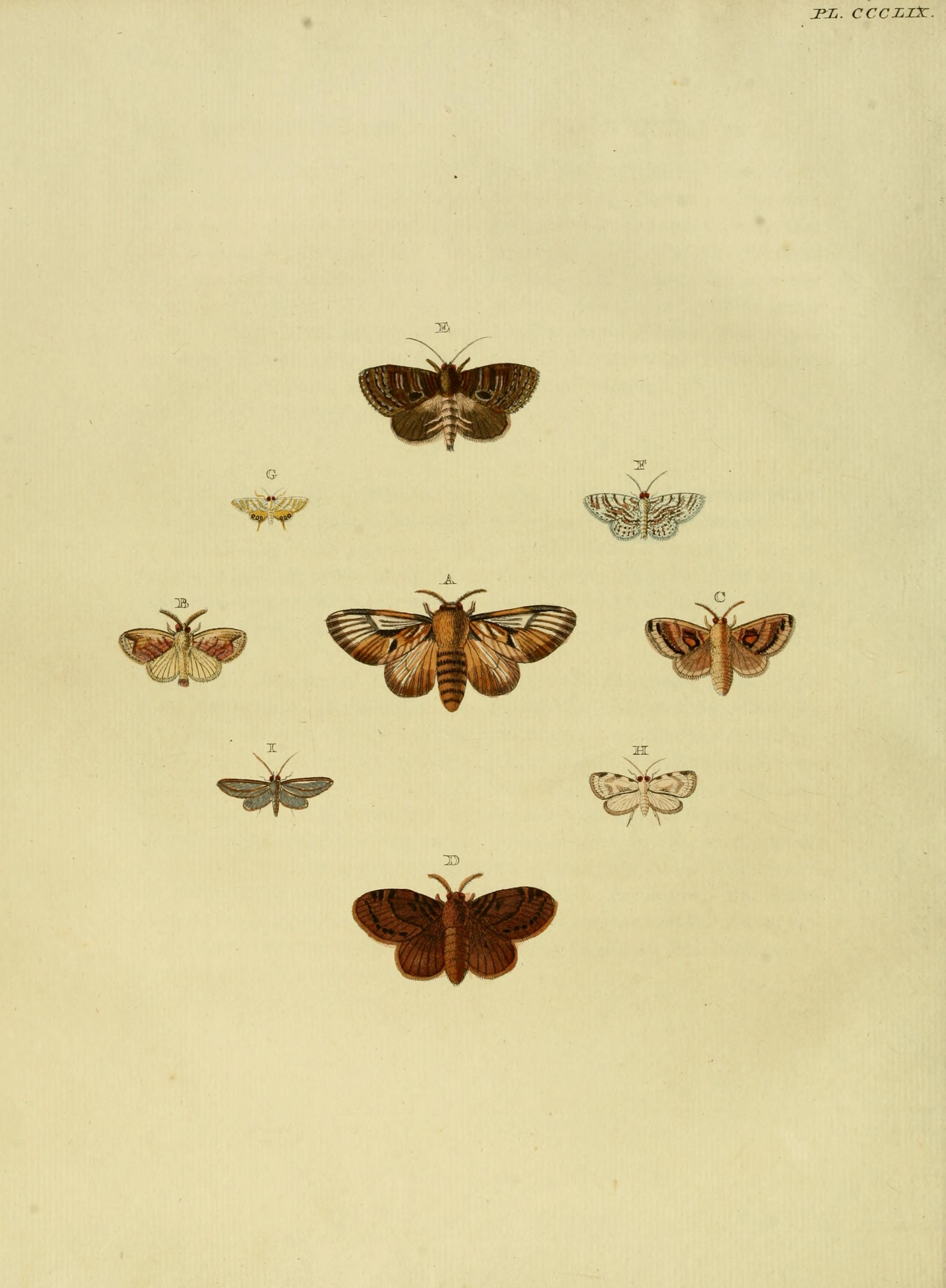

Scientific classification
- Kingdom: Animalia
- Phylum: Arthropoda
- Class: Insecta
- Order: Lepidoptera
- Family: Crambidae
- Subfamily: Acentropinae
- Genus: Argyractis; Hampson, 1897

= Argyractis =

Genus of moths

Argyractis is a genus of moths of the family Crambidae.

== Species ==
- Argyractis argentilinealis Hampson, 1897
- Argyractis berthalis (Schaus, 1906)
- Argyractis coloralis (Guenée, 1854)
- Argyractis dodalis Schaus, 1924
- Argyractis drumalis (Dyar, 1906)
- Argyractis elphegalis (Schaus, 1924)
- Argyractis flavalis (Warren, 1889)
- Argyractis iasusalis (Walker, 1859)
- Argyractis lophosomalis Hampson, 1906
- Argyractis obliquifascia (Hampson, 1917)
- Argyractis parthenodalis Hampson, 1906
- Argyractis subornata (Hampson, 1897)
- Argyractis tapajosalis Schaus, 1924

== Former species ==
- Argyractis albipunctalis (Hampson, 1897)
- Argyractis argyrolepta (Dyar, 1914)
- Argyractis cancellalis (Dyar, 1917)
- Argyractis constellalis (Hampson, 1897)
- Argyractis fulvicinctalis (Hampson, 1897)
- Argyractis glycysalis (Dyar, 1914)
- Argyractis lanceolalis (Hampson, 1897)
- Argyractis leucostola Hampson, 1917
- Argyractis leucostrialis Hampson, 1906
- Argyractis multipicta (Dyar, 1914)
- Argyractis nandinalis Hampson, 1906
- Argyractis nigerialis Hampson, 1906
- Argyractis niphoplagialis Hampson, 1897
- Argyractis nymphulalis Hampson, 1906
- Argyractis pentopalis Hampson, 1906
- Argyractis pavonialis (Hampson, 1897)
- Argyractis pervenustalis (Hampson, 1897)
- Argyractis supercilialis (Hampson, 1897)
- Argyractis ticonalis Dyar, 1914
