= Eoophyla candidalis =

Scientific classification
- Domain: Eukaryota
- Kingdom: Animalia
- Phylum: Arthropoda
- Class: Insecta
- Order: Lepidoptera
- Family: Crambidae
- Genus: Eoophyla
- Species: E. candidalis

Binomial name
- Eoophyla candidalis (Pagenstecher, 1886)

Synonyms
- Oligostigma candidalis Pagenstecher, 1886

Species of moth

Eoophyla candidalis is a moth in the family Crambidae. It was described by Pagenstecher in 1886. It is found on the Aru Islands.
