= Paracataclysta =

Scientific classification
- Domain: Eukaryota
- Kingdom: Animalia
- Phylum: Arthropoda
- Class: Insecta
- Order: Lepidoptera
- Family: Crambidae
- Genus: Paracataclysta; Yoshiyasu, 1983
- Species: P. fuscalis

Binomial name
- Paracataclysta fuscalis (Hampson, 1893)

Synonyms
- Cataclysta fuscalis Hampson, 1893; Catoclysta fuscalis; Cataclysta nyctopis Meyrick, 1894

Genus of moths

Paracataclysta is a monotypic moth genus in the family Crambidae described by Yutaka Yoshiyasu in 1983. Its single species, Paracataclysta fuscalis, was described by George Hampson in 1893. It is found in South-east Asia (including Sri Lanka and Borneo), northern Australia and Africa.

The wingspan is 10–14 mm.

== Former species ==
- Paracataclysta dualalis (Gaede, 1916)
