= Theila =

Scientific classification
- Domain: Eukaryota
- Kingdom: Animalia
- Phylum: Arthropoda
- Class: Insecta
- Order: Lepidoptera
- Family: Crambidae
- Subfamily: Acentropinae
- Genus: Theila; C. Swinhoe, 1900

Synonyms
- Ambahona Marion, 1954; Ambahonia Marion, 1954

Genus of moths

Theila is a genus of moths of the family Crambidae. The genus was erected by Charles Swinhoe in 1900.

== Species ==
- Theila distributa (T. P. Lucas, 1898)
- Theila fusconebulalis (Marion, 1954)
- Theila metallosticha (Turner, 1938)
- Theila siennata (Warren, 1896)
- Theila triplaga (Lower, 1903)

== Former species ==
- Theila plicatalis (Walker, 1866)
