= Aeolosia atropunctata =

Scientific classification
- Domain: Eukaryota
- Kingdom: Animalia
- Phylum: Arthropoda
- Class: Insecta
- Order: Lepidoptera
- Superfamily: Noctuoidea
- Family: Erebidae
- Subfamily: Arctiinae
- Genus: Aeolosia
- Species: A. atropunctata

Binomial name
- Aeolosia atropunctata (Pagenstecher, 1895)

Synonyms
- Cidaria atropunctata Pagenstecher, 1895; Aeolosia alba Snellen, 1904

Species of moth

Aeolosia atropunctata is a moth of the subfamily Arctiinae. It is found on Java.
