= Eoophyla orphninalis =

Scientific classification
- Domain: Eukaryota
- Kingdom: Animalia
- Phylum: Arthropoda
- Class: Insecta
- Order: Lepidoptera
- Family: Crambidae
- Genus: Eoophyla
- Species: E. orphninalis

Binomial name
- Eoophyla orphninalis (Pagenstecher, 1886)

Synonyms
- Oligostigma orphninalis Pagenstecher, 1886

Species of moth

Eoophyla orphninalis is a moth in the family Crambidae. It was described by Pagenstecher in 1886. It is found on the Aru Islands.
