= Trichaetoides albifrontalis =

Scientific classification
- Domain: Eukaryota
- Kingdom: Animalia
- Phylum: Arthropoda
- Class: Insecta
- Order: Lepidoptera
- Superfamily: Noctuoidea
- Family: Erebidae
- Subfamily: Arctiinae
- Genus: Trichaetoides
- Species: T. albifrontalis

Binomial name
- Trichaetoides albifrontalis (Pagenstecher, 1885)

Synonyms
- Syntomis albifrontalis Pagenstecher, 1885

Species of moth

Trichaetoides albifrontalis is a moth in the family Erebidae. It was described by Arnold Pagenstecher in 1885. It is found on Nias in Indonesia.
