= Noctuides griseoviridis =

Scientific classification
- Kingdom: Animalia
- Phylum: Arthropoda
- Class: Insecta
- Order: Lepidoptera
- Family: Pyralidae
- Genus: Noctuides
- Species: N. griseoviridis

Binomial name
- Noctuides griseoviridis (Pagenstecher, 1907)

Synonyms
- Anartula griseoviridis Pagenstecher, 1907

Species of moth

Noctuides griseoviridis is a species of snout moth in the genus Noctuides. It is known from Madagascar.
