= Eoophyla saturatalis =

Scientific classification
- Kingdom: Animalia
- Phylum: Arthropoda
- Class: Insecta
- Order: Lepidoptera
- Family: Crambidae
- Genus: Eoophyla
- Species: E. saturatalis

Binomial name
- Eoophyla saturatalis (Snellen, 1890)

Synonyms
- Oligostigma saturatalis Snellen, 1890

Species of moth

Eoophyla saturatalis is a moth in the family Crambidae. It was described by Snellen in 1890. It is found in Sikkim, India.
