= Eoophyla accra =

Scientific classification
- Domain: Eukaryota
- Kingdom: Animalia
- Phylum: Arthropoda
- Class: Insecta
- Order: Lepidoptera
- Family: Crambidae
- Genus: Eoophyla
- Species: E. accra

Binomial name
- Eoophyla accra (Strand, 1913)

Synonyms
- Cataclysta accra Strand, 1913; Eoophyla alba Mey, 2009; Argyractis dorophanes Meyrick, 1937

Species of moth

Eoophyla accra is a moth in the family Crambidae. It was described by Strand in 1913. It is found in Angola, Cameroon, the Republic of the Congo, the Democratic Republic of the Congo, Equatorial Guinea (Bioko), Ghana, Sierra Leone and Uganda.

The wingspan is 13–18 millimetres (0.51–0.71 in).
