= Eoophyla diopsalis =

Scientific classification
- Kingdom: Animalia
- Phylum: Arthropoda
- Class: Insecta
- Order: Lepidoptera
- Family: Crambidae
- Genus: Eoophyla
- Species: E. diopsalis

Binomial name
- Eoophyla diopsalis (Hampson, 1897)

Synonyms
- Aulacodes diopsalis Hampson, 1897; Aulacodes diopsalis major Rothschild, 1915

Species of moth

Eoophyla diopsalis is a moth in the family Crambidae. It was described by George Hampson in 1897. It is found on New Guinea and Fergusson Island, the Moluccas and Ambon Island.
