= Eoophyla parapomasalis =

Scientific classification
- Kingdom: Animalia
- Phylum: Arthropoda
- Class: Insecta
- Order: Lepidoptera
- Family: Crambidae
- Genus: Eoophyla
- Species: E. parapomasalis

Binomial name
- Eoophyla parapomasalis (Hampson, 1897)

Synonyms
- Aulacodes parapomasalis Hampson, 1897; Oligostigma tripunctalis Snellen, 1876 (preocc.); Aulacodes klimai Bryk, 1937

Species of moth

Eoophyla parapomasalis is a moth in the family Crambidae. It was described by George Hampson in 1897. It is found on Flores and Java in Indonesia.
