= Argyractis flavalis =

Scientific classification
- Kingdom: Animalia
- Phylum: Arthropoda
- Class: Insecta
- Order: Lepidoptera
- Family: Crambidae
- Genus: Argyractis
- Species: A. flavalis

Binomial name
- Argyractis flavalis (Warren, 1889)

Synonyms
- Pterygisus flavalis Warren, 1889

Species of moth

Argyractis flavalis is a species of moth in the family Crambidae. It is found in Brazil.
