= Eoophyla tripunctalis =

Scientific classification
- Domain: Eukaryota
- Kingdom: Animalia
- Phylum: Arthropoda
- Class: Insecta
- Order: Lepidoptera
- Family: Crambidae
- Genus: Eoophyla
- Species: E. tripunctalis

Binomial name
- Eoophyla tripunctalis (Snellen, 1872)

Synonyms
- Cataclysta tripunctalis Snellen, 1872; Argyractis triopalis Hampson, 1906

Species of moth

Eoophyla tripunctalis is a moth in the family Crambidae. It was described by Samuel Constantinus Snellen van Vollenhoven in 1872. It is found in Cameroon, the Democratic Republic of the Congo, Ghana, Ivory Coast, Nigeria and Sierra Leone.

The wingspan is 13–18 millimetres (0.51–0.71 in).
