= Argyractis berthalis =

Scientific classification
- Kingdom: Animalia
- Phylum: Arthropoda
- Class: Insecta
- Order: Lepidoptera
- Family: Crambidae
- Genus: Argyractis
- Species: A. berthalis

Binomial name
- Argyractis berthalis (Schaus, 1906)

Synonyms
- Parthenodes berthalis Schaus, 1906

Species of moth

Argyractis berthalis is a species of moth in the family Crambidae. It is found in Brazil (Parana, São Paulo).

The forewings are pale yellowish up to the subterminal line. The terminal area is yellowish brown with a terminal row of black dots. The hindwings are whitish.
