= Eoophyla euryxantha =

Scientific classification
- Kingdom: Animalia
- Phylum: Arthropoda
- Class: Insecta
- Order: Lepidoptera
- Family: Crambidae
- Genus: Eoophyla
- Species: E. euryxantha

Binomial name
- Eoophyla euryxantha (Meyrick, 1936)

Synonyms
- Argyractis euryxantha Meyrick, 1936

Species of moth

Eoophyla euryxantha is a moth in the family Crambidae. It was described by Edward Meyrick in 1936. It is found in the Republic of the Congo and the Democratic Republic of the Congo.

The wingspan is 13–17 mm.
