= Eoophyla crassicornalis =

Scientific classification
- Kingdom: Animalia
- Phylum: Arthropoda
- Class: Insecta
- Order: Lepidoptera
- Family: Crambidae
- Genus: Eoophyla
- Species: E. crassicornalis

Binomial name
- Eoophyla crassicornalis (Guenée, 1854)

Synonyms
- Oligostigma crassicornalis Guenée, 1854; Oligostigma javanalis Guenée, 1854

Species of moth

Eoophyla crassicornalis is a moth in the family Crambidae. It was described by Achille Guenée in 1854. It is found on Java.
