= Eoophyla cervinalis =

Scientific classification
- Kingdom: Animalia
- Phylum: Arthropoda
- Clade: Pancrustacea
- Class: Insecta
- Order: Lepidoptera
- Family: Crambidae
- Genus: Eoophyla
- Species: E. cervinalis

Binomial name
- Eoophyla cervinalis Speidel, 2003

Species of moth

Eoophyla cervinalis is a moth in the family Crambidae. It was described by Speidel in 2003. It is found on the island of Mindanao in the Philippines.
