= Eoophyla grandifuscalis =

Scientific classification
- Domain: Eukaryota
- Kingdom: Animalia
- Phylum: Arthropoda
- Class: Insecta
- Order: Lepidoptera
- Family: Crambidae
- Genus: Eoophyla
- Species: E. grandifuscalis

Binomial name
- Eoophyla grandifuscalis Agassiz, 2012

Species of moth

Eoophyla grandifuscalis is a moth in the family Crambidae. It was described by David John Lawrence Agassiz in 2012. It is found in Cameroon and Nigeria.

The wingspan is 15–25 mm.
