= Eoophyla ectopalis =

Scientific classification
- Kingdom: Animalia
- Phylum: Arthropoda
- Class: Insecta
- Order: Lepidoptera
- Family: Crambidae
- Genus: Eoophyla
- Species: E. ectopalis

Binomial name
- Eoophyla ectopalis (Hampson, 1906)

Synonyms
- Parthenodes ectopalis Hampson, 1906

Species of moth

Eoophyla ectopalis is a moth in the family Crambidae. It was described by George Hampson in 1906. It is found on Borneo.
