= Eoophyla munroei =

Scientific classification
- Kingdom: Animalia
- Phylum: Arthropoda
- Clade: Pancrustacea
- Class: Insecta
- Order: Lepidoptera
- Family: Crambidae
- Genus: Eoophyla
- Species: E. munroei

Binomial name
- Eoophyla munroei Agassiz & Mey, 2011

Species of moth

Eoophyla munroei is a moth in the family Crambidae. It was described by David John Lawrence Agassiz and Wolfram Mey in 2011 and lives in South Africa.

The wingspan is 18–29 mm. The forewings are dark fuscous with a pale white antemedian fascia in the dorsal half of the wing and a brownish-white postmedian fascia. The hindwings are light with a dark fuscous subbasal fascia and antemedian fascia.
