= Argyractis subornata =

Scientific classification
- Kingdom: Animalia
- Phylum: Arthropoda
- Class: Insecta
- Order: Lepidoptera
- Family: Crambidae
- Genus: Argyractis
- Species: A. subornata

Binomial name
- Argyractis subornata (Hampson, 1897)

Synonyms
- Cataclysta subornata Hampson, 1897

Species of moth

Argyractis subornata is a species of moth in the family Crambidae. It is found in Brazil (São Paulo).
