= Eoophyla cyclozonalis =

Scientific classification
- Kingdom: Animalia
- Phylum: Arthropoda
- Class: Insecta
- Order: Lepidoptera
- Family: Crambidae
- Genus: Eoophyla
- Species: E. cyclozonalis

Binomial name
- Eoophyla cyclozonalis (Hampson, 1906)

Synonyms
- Aulacodes cyclozonalis Hampson, 1906

Species of moth

Eoophyla cyclozonalis is a moth in the family Crambidae. It was described by George Hampson in 1906. It is found on New Guinea.
