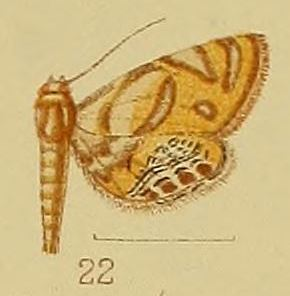

Scientific classification
- Kingdom: Animalia
- Phylum: Arthropoda
- Class: Insecta
- Order: Lepidoptera
- Family: Crambidae
- Genus: Eoophyla
- Species: E. capensis

Binomial name
- Eoophyla capensis (Hampson, 1906)

Synonyms
- Argyractis capensis Hampson, 1906; Argyractis periopis Hampson, 1910; Cataclysta sambesica Strand, 1909

= Eoophyla capensis =

Species of moth

Eoophyla capensis is a moth in the family Crambidae. It was described by George Hampson in 1906. It is found in Angola, Cameroon, Ethiopia, Kenya, Liberia, Malawi, Mozambique, Namibia, Nigeria, South Africa, Tanzania, Uganda, Zambia and Zimbabwe.

The wingspan is 13–21 mm. Adults have been recorded on wing from January to August and from October to December.
