= Eoophyla menglensis =

Scientific classification
- Domain: Eukaryota
- Kingdom: Animalia
- Phylum: Arthropoda
- Class: Insecta
- Order: Lepidoptera
- Family: Crambidae
- Genus: Eoophyla
- Species: E. menglensis

Binomial name
- Eoophyla menglensis Li, An, Li & Liu, 1995

Species of moth

Eoophyla menglensis is a moth in the family Crambidae. It was described by H.-H. Li, X.-C. An, Y.-Y. Li and M.-T. Liu in 1995. It is found in Yunnan, China.
