= Eoophyla clasnaumanni =

Scientific classification
- Kingdom: Animalia
- Phylum: Arthropoda
- Clade: Pancrustacea
- Class: Insecta
- Order: Lepidoptera
- Family: Crambidae
- Genus: Eoophyla
- Species: E. clasnaumanni

Binomial name
- Eoophyla clasnaumanni Speidel & Mey in Mey & Speidel, 2005

Species of moth

Eoophyla clasnaumanni is a moth in the family Crambidae. It was described by Speidel and Mey in 2005. It is found in northern Thailand.
