= Noctuides albifascia =

Scientific classification
- Kingdom: Animalia
- Phylum: Arthropoda
- Class: Insecta
- Order: Lepidoptera
- Family: Pyralidae
- Genus: Noctuides
- Species: N. albifascia

Binomial name
- Noctuides albifascia (de Joannis, 1930)

Synonyms
- Anartula albifascia de Joannis, 1930

Species of moth

Noctuides albifascia is a species of snout moth in the genus Noctuides. It is known from Vietnam.
