= Eoophyla halialis =

Scientific classification
- Kingdom: Animalia
- Phylum: Arthropoda
- Class: Insecta
- Order: Lepidoptera
- Family: Crambidae
- Genus: Eoophyla
- Species: E. halialis

Binomial name
- Eoophyla halialis (Walker, 1859)

Synonyms
- Cataclysta halialis Walker, 1859; Cataclysta sabrina Pryer, 1877

Species of moth

Eoophyla halialis is a moth in the family Crambidae. It was described by Francis Walker in 1859. It is found in China.
