= Eoophyla pulchralis =

Scientific classification
- Kingdom: Animalia
- Phylum: Arthropoda
- Clade: Pancrustacea
- Class: Insecta
- Order: Lepidoptera
- Family: Crambidae
- Genus: Eoophyla
- Species: E. pulchralis

Binomial name
- Eoophyla pulchralis Speidel, 2003

Species of moth

Eoophyla pulchralis is a moth in the family Crambidae. It was described by Speidel in 2003. It is found in the Philippines (Luzon).
