= Noctuides =

Scientific classification
- Kingdom: Animalia
- Phylum: Arthropoda
- Class: Insecta
- Order: Lepidoptera
- Family: Pyralidae
- Subfamily: Epipaschiinae
- Genus: Noctuides; Staudinger, 1892

Synonyms
- Anartula Staudinger, 1893; Arnatula Hampson, 1896; Parorthaga Hampson, 1896

Genus of moths

Noctuides is a genus of snout moths. It was described by Otto Staudinger in 1892.

== Species ==
- Noctuides albifascia
- Noctuides circumlucens (Dyar, 1914)
- Noctuides griseoviridis
- Noctuides melanochyta
- Noctuides melanophia Staudinger, 1892
- Noctuides thurivora
