= Eoophyla belladotae =

Scientific classification
- Kingdom: Animalia
- Phylum: Arthropoda
- Clade: Pancrustacea
- Class: Insecta
- Order: Lepidoptera
- Family: Crambidae
- Genus: Eoophyla
- Species: E. belladotae

Binomial name
- Eoophyla belladotae Agassiz, 2012

Species of moth

Eoophyla belladotae is a moth in the family Crambidae. It was described by David John Lawrence Agassiz in 2012. It is found in Kenya, South Africa, Uganda and Zambia.

The wingspan is 16–22 mm. Adults have been recorded on wing from April to June, from August to September and from November to December.

== Etymology ==
The species is named in honour of the wife of the author with the Latin prefix bella (meaning beautiful).
