= Eoophyla mimeticalis =

Scientific classification
- Domain: Eukaryota
- Kingdom: Animalia
- Phylum: Arthropoda
- Class: Insecta
- Order: Lepidoptera
- Family: Crambidae
- Genus: Eoophyla
- Species: E. mimeticalis

Binomial name
- Eoophyla mimeticalis (Caradja, 1925)

Synonyms
- Aulacodes mimeticalis Caradja, 1925

Species of moth

Eoophyla mimeticalis is a moth in the family Crambidae. It was described by Aristide Caradja in 1925. It is found in China.
