= Eoophyla similis =

Scientific classification
- Domain: Eukaryota
- Kingdom: Animalia
- Phylum: Arthropoda
- Class: Insecta
- Order: Lepidoptera
- Family: Crambidae
- Genus: Eoophyla
- Species: E. similis

Binomial name
- Eoophyla similis (Rothschild, 1915)

Synonyms
- Aulacodes similis Rothschild, 1915

Species of moth

Eoophyla similis is a moth in the family Crambidae. It was described by Rothschild in 1915. It is found in New Guinea.
