= Eoophyla interopalis =

Scientific classification
- Kingdom: Animalia
- Phylum: Arthropoda
- Class: Insecta
- Order: Lepidoptera
- Family: Crambidae
- Genus: Eoophyla
- Species: E. interopalis

Binomial name
- Eoophyla interopalis Agassiz, 2012

Species of moth

Eoophyla interopalis is a moth in the family Crambidae. It was described by David John Lawrence Agassiz in 2012. It is found in Malawi, Mozambique, South Africa, Tanzania, Zambia and Zimbabwe.

The wingspan is 10–14 mm. Adults have been recorded on wing from November to May.

== Etymology ==
The species name refers to the white marking between eyespots three and four.
