= Eoophyla dentisigna =

Scientific classification
- Domain: Eukaryota
- Kingdom: Animalia
- Phylum: Arthropoda
- Class: Insecta
- Order: Lepidoptera
- Family: Crambidae
- Genus: Eoophyla
- Species: E. dentisigna

Binomial name
- Eoophyla dentisigna Agassiz, 2012

Species of moth

Eoophyla dentisigna is a moth in the family Crambidae. It was described by David John Lawrence Agassiz in 2012. It is found in Cameroon, the Republic of the Congo and Sierra Leone.

The wingspan is 15–18 mm. Adults have been recorded on wing in March and December.
