= Oxyelophila melanograpta =

Scientific classification
- Kingdom: Animalia
- Phylum: Arthropoda
- Class: Insecta
- Order: Lepidoptera
- Family: Crambidae
- Genus: Oxyelophila
- Species: O. melanograpta

Binomial name
- Oxyelophila melanograpta (Hampson, 1917)

Synonyms
- Argyractis melanograpta Hampson, 1917

Species of moth

Oxyelophila melanograpta is a species of moth in the family Crambidae. It was described by George Hampson in 1917. It is found in Guyana.
