= Eoophyla sejunctalis =

Scientific classification
- Kingdom: Animalia
- Phylum: Arthropoda
- Class: Insecta
- Order: Lepidoptera
- Family: Crambidae
- Genus: Eoophyla
- Species: E. sejunctalis

Binomial name
- Eoophyla sejunctalis (Snellen, 1876)

Synonyms
- Oligostigma sejunctalis Snellen, 1876; Cataclysta delicata Moore, [1887]

Species of moth

Eoophyla sejunctalis is a moth in the family Crambidae. It was described by Snellen in 1876. It is found in India and Sri Lanka.
