= Eoophyla aurantipennis =

Scientific classification
- Kingdom: Animalia
- Phylum: Arthropoda
- Class: Insecta
- Order: Lepidoptera
- Family: Crambidae
- Genus: Eoophyla
- Species: E. aurantipennis

Binomial name
- Eoophyla aurantipennis (Hampson, 1917)

Synonyms
- Aulacodes aurantipennis Hampson, 1917

Species of moth

Eoophyla aurantipennis is a moth in the family Crambidae. It was described by George Hampson in 1917. It is found on New Guinea.
