= Eoophyla dendrophila =

Scientific classification
- Kingdom: Animalia
- Phylum: Arthropoda
- Clade: Pancrustacea
- Class: Insecta
- Order: Lepidoptera
- Family: Crambidae
- Genus: Eoophyla
- Species: E. dendrophila

Binomial name
- Eoophyla dendrophila Speidel, Mey & Schulze, 2002

Species of moth

Eoophyla dendrophila is a moth in the family Crambidae. It was described by Wolfgang Speidel, Wolfram Mey and Christian H. Schulze in 2002. It is found in Sabah, Malaysia.
