= Eoophyla adjunctalis =

Scientific classification
- Kingdom: Animalia
- Phylum: Arthropoda
- Class: Insecta
- Order: Lepidoptera
- Family: Crambidae
- Genus: Eoophyla
- Species: E. adjunctalis

Binomial name
- Eoophyla adjunctalis (Snellen, 1895)

Synonyms
- Oligostigma adjunctalis Snellen, 1895

Species of moth

Eoophyla adjunctalis is a moth in the family Crambidae. It was described by Snellen in 1895. It is found on Java.
