= Eoophyla waigaoalis =

Scientific classification
- Domain: Eukaryota
- Kingdom: Animalia
- Phylum: Arthropoda
- Class: Insecta
- Order: Lepidoptera
- Family: Crambidae
- Genus: Eoophyla
- Species: E. waigaoalis

Binomial name
- Eoophyla waigaoalis C. Swinhoe, 1900

Species of moth

Eoophyla waigaoalis is a moth in the family Crambidae. It was described by Charles Swinhoe in 1900. It is found on Waigiu.
