= Trichaetoides divisura =

Scientific classification
- Kingdom: Animalia
- Phylum: Arthropoda
- Class: Insecta
- Order: Lepidoptera
- Superfamily: Noctuoidea
- Family: Erebidae
- Subfamily: Arctiinae
- Genus: Trichaetoides
- Species: T. divisura

Binomial name
- Trichaetoides divisura (Walker, 1862)

Synonyms
- Syntomis divisura Walker, 1862

Species of moth

Trichaetoides divisura is a moth in the family Erebidae first described by Francis Walker in 1862. It is found on Borneo and Sumatra.
