= Aeolosia multipunctata =

Scientific classification
- Kingdom: Animalia
- Phylum: Arthropoda
- Class: Insecta
- Order: Lepidoptera
- Superfamily: Noctuoidea
- Family: Erebidae
- Subfamily: Arctiinae
- Genus: Aeolosia
- Species: A. multipunctata

Binomial name
- Aeolosia multipunctata Hampson, 1900

Species of moth

Aeolosia multipunctata is a moth of the subfamily Arctiinae. It is found in Burma.
