= Oxyelophila harpalis =

Scientific classification
- Kingdom: Animalia
- Phylum: Arthropoda
- Class: Insecta
- Order: Lepidoptera
- Family: Crambidae
- Genus: Oxyelophila
- Species: O. harpalis

Binomial name
- Oxyelophila harpalis (Snellen, 1901)

Synonyms
- Cataclysta harpalis Snellen, 1901

Species of moth

Oxyelophila harpalis is a species of moth in the family Crambidae. It was described by Snellen in 1901. It is found in Costa Rica.
