= Eoophyla nigripilosa =

Scientific classification
- Domain: Eukaryota
- Kingdom: Animalia
- Phylum: Arthropoda
- Class: Insecta
- Order: Lepidoptera
- Family: Crambidae
- Genus: Eoophyla
- Species: E. nigripilosa

Binomial name
- Eoophyla nigripilosa Yoshiyasu, 1987

Species of moth

Eoophyla nigripilosa is a moth in the family Crambidae. It was described by Yoshiyasu in 1987. It is found in Thailand.
