= Eoophyla stepheni =

Scientific classification
- Domain: Eukaryota
- Kingdom: Animalia
- Phylum: Arthropoda
- Class: Insecta
- Order: Lepidoptera
- Family: Crambidae
- Genus: Eoophyla
- Species: E. stepheni

Binomial name
- Eoophyla stepheni Agassiz, 2012

Species of moth

Eoophyla stepheni is a moth in the family Crambidae. It was described by David John Lawrence Agassiz in 2012. It is found in the Republic of the Congo, Cameroon, Zambia and Zimbabwe.

The wingspan is 12–14 mm.

== Etymology ==
The species is named for Capt. Richard Stephen, who collected the holotype.
