= Eoophyla schintlmeisteri =

Scientific classification
- Kingdom: Animalia
- Phylum: Arthropoda
- Clade: Pancrustacea
- Class: Insecta
- Order: Lepidoptera
- Family: Crambidae
- Genus: Eoophyla
- Species: E. schintlmeisteri

Binomial name
- Eoophyla schintlmeisteri Speidel, 2003

Species of moth

Eoophyla schintlmeisteri is a moth in the family Crambidae. It was described by Speidel in 2003 and is found in the Philippines, specifically in Luzon.
