= Eoophyla hemicryptis =

Scientific classification
- Kingdom: Animalia
- Phylum: Arthropoda
- Class: Insecta
- Order: Lepidoptera
- Family: Crambidae
- Genus: Eoophyla
- Species: E. hemicryptis

Binomial name
- Eoophyla hemicryptis (Meyrick, 1897)

Synonyms
- Oligostigma hemicryptis Meyrick, 1897

Species of moth

Eoophyla hemicryptis is a moth in the family Crambidae. It was described by Edward Meyrick in 1897. It is found on the Sangihe Islands of Indonesia.
