= Aeolosia =

Scientific classification
- Kingdom: Animalia
- Phylum: Arthropoda
- Class: Insecta
- Order: Lepidoptera
- Superfamily: Noctuoidea
- Family: Erebidae
- Subfamily: Arctiinae
- Tribe: Lithosiini
- Genus: Aeolosia; Hampson, 1900

Synonyms
- Cleolosia Bethune-Baker, 1904; Oeolosia Hampson, 1900

Genus of moths

Aeolosia is a genus of moths in the subfamily Arctiinae.

== Species ==
- Aeolosia aroa
- Aeolosia atropunctata
- Aeolosia multipunctata
