= Argyractis tapajosalis =

Scientific classification
- Domain: Eukaryota
- Kingdom: Animalia
- Phylum: Arthropoda
- Class: Insecta
- Order: Lepidoptera
- Family: Crambidae
- Genus: Argyractis
- Species: A. tapajosalis

Binomial name
- Argyractis tapajosalis Schaus, 1924

Species of moth

Argyractis tapajosalis is a species of Lepidoptera in the crambid snout moths. It is found in Brazil.
