= Eoophyla boernickei =

Scientific classification
- Kingdom: Animalia
- Phylum: Arthropoda
- Clade: Pancrustacea
- Class: Insecta
- Order: Lepidoptera
- Family: Crambidae
- Genus: Eoophyla
- Species: E. boernickei

Binomial name
- Eoophyla boernickei Mey, 2006

Species of moth

Eoophyla boernickei is a moth in the family Crambidae. It was described by Wolfram Mey in 2006. It is found on Sabah, Malaysia.
