= Eoophyla sumatroceratucha =

Scientific classification
- Kingdom: Animalia
- Phylum: Arthropoda
- Clade: Pancrustacea
- Class: Insecta
- Order: Lepidoptera
- Family: Crambidae
- Genus: Eoophyla
- Species: E. sumatroceratucha

Binomial name
- Eoophyla sumatroceratucha Jaenicke & Mey, 2011

Species of moth

Eoophyla sumatroceratucha is a moth in the family Crambidae. It was described by Birgit Jaenicke and Wolfram Mey in 2011. It is found on Sumatra.
