= Oxyelophila micropalis =

Scientific classification
- Kingdom: Animalia
- Phylum: Arthropoda
- Class: Insecta
- Order: Lepidoptera
- Family: Crambidae
- Genus: Oxyelophila
- Species: O. micropalis

Binomial name
- Oxyelophila micropalis (Hampson, 1906)

Synonyms
- Argyractis micropalis Hampson, 1906

Species of moth

Oxyelophila micropalis is a species of moth in the family Crambidae. It was described by George Hampson in 1906. It is found in Tabasco, Mexico.
