= Eoophyla aureolalis =

Scientific classification
- Kingdom: Animalia
- Phylum: Arthropoda
- Class: Insecta
- Order: Lepidoptera
- Family: Crambidae
- Genus: Eoophyla
- Species: E. aureolalis

Binomial name
- Eoophyla aureolalis (Snellen, 1876)

Synonyms
- Oligostigma aureolalis Snellen, 1876

Species of moth

Eoophyla aureolalis is a moth in the family Crambidae. It was described by Snellen in 1876. It is found on Java.
