= Eoophyla argyrilinale =

Scientific classification
- Kingdom: Animalia
- Phylum: Arthropoda
- Class: Insecta
- Order: Lepidoptera
- Family: Crambidae
- Genus: Eoophyla
- Species: E. argyrilinale

Binomial name
- Eoophyla argyrilinale (Hampson, 1897)

Synonyms
- Oligostigma argyrilinale Hampson, 1897

Species of moth

Eoophyla argyrilinale is a moth in the family Crambidae. It was described by George Hampson in 1897. It is found in Australia, where it has been recorded from Queensland.

The wingspan is about 17 mm. There is a pattern of brown and white on the wings.

The larvae are aquatic and feed on various waterweeds. They are pale yellow with tufts of short hairs.
