= Eoophyla leroii =

Scientific classification
- Kingdom: Animalia
- Phylum: Arthropoda
- Class: Insecta
- Order: Lepidoptera
- Family: Crambidae
- Genus: Eoophyla
- Species: E. leroii

Binomial name
- Eoophyla leroii (Strand, 1915)

Synonyms
- Cataclysta leroii Strand, 1915; Argyractis lithocharis Meyrick, 1936

Species of moth

Eoophyla leroii is a species of moth in the family Crambidae. It was described by Embrik Strand in 1915. It is found in Botswana, Cameroon, the Republic of the Congo, the Democratic Republic of the Congo, Nigeria, Sierra Leone, Sudan and Uganda. The habitat consists of areas near rivers and swampy places.

The wingspan is 11–15 mm. Adults have been recorded on wing from January to February, from April to May, in August, October and November.
