= Trichaetoides chloroleuca =

Scientific classification
- Kingdom: Animalia
- Phylum: Arthropoda
- Class: Insecta
- Order: Lepidoptera
- Superfamily: Noctuoidea
- Family: Erebidae
- Subfamily: Arctiinae
- Genus: Trichaetoides
- Species: T. chloroleuca

Binomial name
- Trichaetoides chloroleuca (Walker, 1859)

Synonyms
- Syntomis chloroleuca Walker, 1859; Syntomis detracta Walker, 1862; Syntomis basifera Walker, 1862; Trichaeta diplaga Hampson, 1898; Trichaeta trizonata Hampson, 1898; Trichaeta monoleuca Hampson, 1903; Ceryx dohertyi Rothschild, 1910; Trichaeta biplagiata Rothschild, 1912

Species of moth

Trichaetoides chloroleuca is a moth in the family Erebidae. It was described by Francis Walker in 1859. It is found on Borneo, Sumatra, Peninsular Malaysia and in Singapore. It is mostly found in lowland areas.
