= Eoophyla angustalis =

Scientific classification
- Domain: Eukaryota
- Kingdom: Animalia
- Phylum: Arthropoda
- Class: Insecta
- Order: Lepidoptera
- Family: Crambidae
- Genus: Eoophyla
- Species: E. angustalis

Binomial name
- Eoophyla angustalis (Sauber in Semper, 1902)

Synonyms
- Oligostigma angustalis Sauber in Semper, 1902

Species of moth

Eoophyla angustalis is a moth in the family Crambidae. It was described by Sauber in 1902. It is found on Mindanao in the Philippines.
