= Eoophyla costifascialis =

Scientific classification
- Kingdom: Animalia
- Phylum: Arthropoda
- Class: Insecta
- Order: Lepidoptera
- Family: Crambidae
- Genus: Eoophyla
- Species: E. costifascialis

Binomial name
- Eoophyla costifascialis (Hampson, 1917)

Synonyms
- Aulacodes costifascialis Hampson, 1917

Species of moth

Eoophyla costifascialis is a moth in the family Crambidae. It was described by George Hampson in 1917. It is found on the D'Entrecasteaux Islands and Goodenough Island.
