= Oxyelophila callista =

Scientific classification
- Kingdom: Animalia
- Phylum: Arthropoda
- Clade: Pancrustacea
- Class: Insecta
- Order: Lepidoptera
- Family: Crambidae
- Genus: Oxyelophila
- Species: O. callista

Binomial name
- Oxyelophila callista Forbes, 1922

Synonyms
- Argyractis callista Forbes, 1922

Species of moth

Oxyelophila callista is a species of moth in the family Crambidae. It was described by William Trowbridge Merrifield Forbes in 1922. It is found in North America, where it has been recorded from Texas.

The wingspan is about 13 mm. Adults have been recorded on wing in May and October.

The larvae are aquatic.
