= Trichaetoides hosei =

Scientific classification
- Domain: Eukaryota
- Kingdom: Animalia
- Phylum: Arthropoda
- Class: Insecta
- Order: Lepidoptera
- Superfamily: Noctuoidea
- Family: Erebidae
- Subfamily: Arctiinae
- Genus: Trichaetoides
- Species: T. hosei

Binomial name
- Trichaetoides hosei (Rothschild, 1910)

Synonyms
- Trichaeta hosei Rothschild, 1910

Species of moth

Trichaetoides hosei is a moth in the family Erebidae. It was described by Walter Rothschild in 1910. It is found on Borneo. The habitat consists of montane areas, including lower montane forests.
