= Eoophyla hauensteini =

Scientific classification
- Kingdom: Animalia
- Phylum: Arthropoda
- Clade: Pancrustacea
- Class: Insecta
- Order: Lepidoptera
- Family: Crambidae
- Genus: Eoophyla
- Species: E. hauensteini

Binomial name
- Eoophyla hauensteini Speidel & Mey, 1999

Species of moth

Eoophyla hauensteini is a moth in the family Crambidae. It was described by Speidel and Mey in 1999. It is found in the Philippines (Luzon).
