= Eoophyla fuscicostalis =

Scientific classification
- Domain: Eukaryota
- Kingdom: Animalia
- Phylum: Arthropoda
- Class: Insecta
- Order: Lepidoptera
- Family: Crambidae
- Genus: Eoophyla
- Species: E. fuscicostalis

Binomial name
- Eoophyla fuscicostalis (Rothschild, 1915)

Synonyms
- Aulacodes fuscicostalis Rothschild, 1915

Species of moth

Eoophyla fuscicostalis is a moth in the family Crambidae. It was described by Rothschild in 1915. It is found in Algeria.
