= Eoophyla ruwenzoriensis =

Scientific classification
- Domain: Eukaryota
- Kingdom: Animalia
- Phylum: Arthropoda
- Class: Insecta
- Order: Lepidoptera
- Family: Crambidae
- Genus: Eoophyla
- Species: E. ruwenzoriensis

Binomial name
- Eoophyla ruwenzoriensis Agassiz, 2012

Species of moth

Eoophyla ruwenzoriensis is a moth in the family Crambidae. It was described by David John Lawrence Agassiz in 2012. It is found in Uganda.

The wingspan is 23–26 mm.

== Etymology ==
The species name refers to the Ruwenzori Mountains, where the species is found.
