= Eoophyla acroperalis =

Scientific classification
- Kingdom: Animalia
- Phylum: Arthropoda
- Class: Insecta
- Order: Lepidoptera
- Family: Crambidae
- Genus: Eoophyla
- Species: E. acroperalis

Binomial name
- Eoophyla acroperalis (Hampson, 1897)

Synonyms
- Aulacodes acroperalis Hampson, 1897

Species of moth

Eoophyla acroperalis is a moth in the family Crambidae. It was described by George Hampson in 1897. It is found on Fergusson Island in Papua New Guinea.
