= Eoophyla piscatorum =

Scientific classification
- Domain: Eukaryota
- Kingdom: Animalia
- Phylum: Arthropoda
- Class: Insecta
- Order: Lepidoptera
- Family: Crambidae
- Genus: Eoophyla
- Species: E. piscatorum

Binomial name
- Eoophyla piscatorum Agassiz, 2012

Species of moth

Eoophyla piscatorum is a moth in the family Crambidae. It was described by David John Lawrence Agassiz in 2012. It is found in Kenya.

The wingspan is 18–22 mm.

== Etymology ==
The species name is derived from the Latin word for of the fishermen and refers to the type locality which is a fishing camp run by the Kenya Fly Fishers Club.
