= Eoophyla cocos =

Scientific classification
- Kingdom: Animalia
- Phylum: Arthropoda
- Clade: Pancrustacea
- Class: Insecta
- Order: Lepidoptera
- Family: Crambidae
- Genus: Eoophyla
- Species: E. cocos

Binomial name
- Eoophyla cocos Mey, 2009

Species of moth

Eoophyla cocos is a moth in the family Crambidae. It was described by Wolfram Mey in 2009. It is found in the Malaysian province of Sabah, on the island of Borneo.
