= Noctuides melanophia =

Scientific classification
- Kingdom: Animalia
- Phylum: Arthropoda
- Class: Insecta
- Order: Lepidoptera
- Family: Pyralidae
- Genus: Noctuides
- Species: N. melanophia

Binomial name
- Noctuides melanophia (Staudinger, 1892)

Synonyms
- Arnatula melanophia Staudinger, 1892; Parorthaga euryptera Meyrick, 1894

Species of moth

Noctuides melanophia is a species of snout moth, and the type species in the genus Noctuides. It was described by Staudinger in 1892, and is known from Russia, Japan and Malaysia.
