= Oxyelophila =

Scientific classification
- Kingdom: Animalia
- Phylum: Arthropoda
- Clade: Pancrustacea
- Class: Insecta
- Order: Lepidoptera
- Family: Crambidae
- Subfamily: Acentropinae
- Genus: Oxyelophila; Forbes, 1922

Genus of moths

Oxyelophila is a genus of moths of the family Crambidae. The genus was described by William Trowbridge Merrifield Forbes in 1922.

== Species ==
- Oxyelophila callista (Forbes, 1922)
- Oxyelophila harpalis (Snellen, 1901)
- Oxyelophila lanceolalis (Hampson, 1897)
- Oxyelophila melanograpta (Hampson, 1917)
- Oxyelophila micropalis (Hampson, 1906)
- Oxyelophila necomalis (Dyar, 1914)
- Oxyelophila puralis (Schaus, 1912)
- Oxyelophila ticonalis (Dyar, 1914)
