= Argyractis dodalis =

Scientific classification
- Kingdom: Animalia
- Phylum: Arthropoda
- Class: Insecta
- Order: Lepidoptera
- Family: Crambidae
- Genus: Argyractis
- Species: A. dodalis

Binomial name
- Argyractis dodalis Schaus, 1924

Species of moth

Argyractis dodalis is a species of moth in the family Crambidae. It is found in Guyana.
