= Eoophyla nyasalis =

Scientific classification
- Kingdom: Animalia
- Phylum: Arthropoda
- Class: Insecta
- Order: Lepidoptera
- Family: Crambidae
- Genus: Eoophyla
- Species: E. nyasalis

Binomial name
- Eoophyla nyasalis (Hampson, 1917)

Synonyms
- Aulacodes nyasalis Hampson, 1917

Species of moth

Eoophyla nyasalis is a moth in the family Crambidae. It was described by George Hampson in 1917. It is found in Cameroon, the Democratic Republic of the Congo, Ethiopia, Kenya, Malawi, Nigeria, Sierra Leone, Tanzania and Zambia.

The wingspan is 20–24 mm. Adults are on wing from May to June and from August to March.

== Subspecies ==
- Eoophyla nyasalis nyasalis
- Eoophyla nyasalis kenyalis Agassiz, 2012 (Kenya)
