= Eoophyla scioxantha =

Scientific classification
- Kingdom: Animalia
- Phylum: Arthropoda
- Class: Insecta
- Order: Lepidoptera
- Family: Crambidae
- Genus: Eoophyla
- Species: E. scioxantha

Binomial name
- Eoophyla scioxantha (Meyrick, 1937)

Synonyms
- Argyractis scioxantha Meyrick, 1937

Species of moth

Eoophyla scioxantha is a moth in the family Crambidae. It was described by Edward Meyrick in 1937. It is found in the Republic of the Congo, the Democratic Republic of the Congo, South Africa and Zambia.

The wingspan is 15–20 mm. The forewings are yellow and the hindwings are white, but brownish centrally.
