= Argyractis obliquifascia =

Scientific classification
- Kingdom: Animalia
- Phylum: Arthropoda
- Class: Insecta
- Order: Lepidoptera
- Family: Crambidae
- Genus: Argyractis
- Species: A. obliquifascia

Binomial name
- Argyractis obliquifascia (Hampson, 1917)

Synonyms
- Cataclysta obliquifascia Hampson, 1917

Species of moth

Argyractis obliquifascia is a species of moth in the family Crambidae. It is found in Brazil.
