= Eoophyla palleuca =

Scientific classification
- Kingdom: Animalia
- Phylum: Arthropoda
- Class: Insecta
- Order: Lepidoptera
- Family: Crambidae
- Genus: Eoophyla
- Species: E. palleuca

Binomial name
- Eoophyla palleuca (Hampson, 1906)

Synonyms
- Oligostigma palleuca Hampson, 1906

Species of moth

Eoophyla palleuca is a moth in the family Crambidae. It was described by George Hampson in 1906. It is found in Borneo.
