= Eoophyla citrialis =

Scientific classification
- Domain: Eukaryota
- Kingdom: Animalia
- Phylum: Arthropoda
- Class: Insecta
- Order: Lepidoptera
- Family: Crambidae
- Genus: Eoophyla
- Species: E. citrialis

Binomial name
- Eoophyla citrialis Agassiz, 2012

Species of moth

Eoophyla citrialis is a moth in the family Crambidae. It was described by David John Lawrence Agassiz in 2012. It is found in Tanzania, where it has been recorded from the Eastern Arc Mountains.

The wingspan is 14–16 mm.

== Etymology ==
The species name refers to the predominant colour of the species and is derived from Greek kitria (meaning lemon).
