= Eoophyla limalis =

Scientific classification
- Kingdom: Animalia
- Phylum: Arthropoda
- Clade: Pancrustacea
- Class: Insecta
- Order: Lepidoptera
- Family: Crambidae
- Genus: Eoophyla
- Species: E. limalis

Binomial name
- Eoophyla limalis Viette, 1957

Species of moth

Eoophyla limalis is a moth in the family Crambidae. It was described by Pierre Viette in 1957. It is found in Equatorial Guinea.

The wingspan is 14–15 mm.
