= Oxyelophila puralis =

Scientific classification
- Kingdom: Animalia
- Phylum: Arthropoda
- Class: Insecta
- Order: Lepidoptera
- Family: Crambidae
- Genus: Oxyelophila
- Species: O. puralis

Binomial name
- Oxyelophila puralis (Schaus, 1912)

Synonyms
- Argyractis puralis Schaus, 1912

Species of moth

Oxyelophila puralis is a species of moth in the family Crambidae. It was described by Schaus in 1912. It is found in Costa Rica and Honduras.
