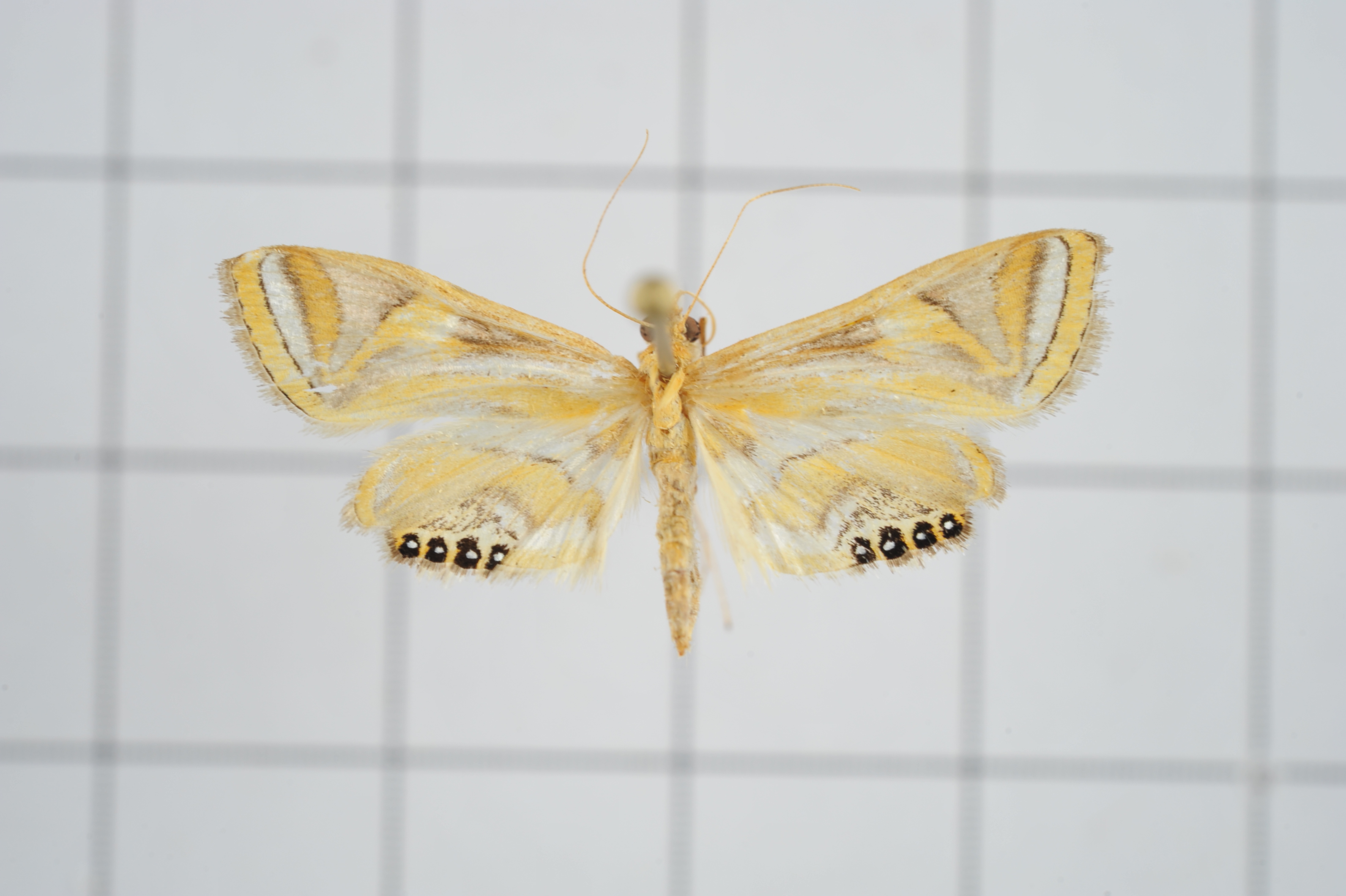

Scientific classification
- Domain: Eukaryota
- Kingdom: Animalia
- Phylum: Arthropoda
- Class: Insecta
- Order: Lepidoptera
- Family: Crambidae
- Genus: Eoophyla
- Species: E. conjunctalis

Binomial name
- Eoophyla conjunctalis (Wileman & South, 1917)

Synonyms
- Aulacodes conjunctalis Wileman & South, 1917; Oligostigma aulacodealis Strand, 1919

= Eoophyla conjunctalis =

Species of moth

Eoophyla conjunctalis is a moth in the family Crambidae. It was described by Wileman and South in 1917. It is found in Taiwan.
