= Theila distributa =

Scientific classification
- Kingdom: Animalia
- Phylum: Arthropoda
- Class: Insecta
- Order: Lepidoptera
- Family: Crambidae
- Genus: Theila
- Species: T. distributa

Binomial name
- Theila distributa (T. P. Lucas, 1898)

Synonyms
- Margarosticha distributa T. P. Lucas, 1898

Species of moth

Theila distributa is a species of moth in the family Crambidae. It was described by Thomas Pennington Lucas in 1898. It is found in Australia, where it has been recorded from Queensland.
