= Eoophyla latipennis =

Scientific classification
- Domain: Eukaryota
- Kingdom: Animalia
- Phylum: Arthropoda
- Class: Insecta
- Order: Lepidoptera
- Family: Crambidae
- Genus: Eoophyla
- Species: E. latipennis

Binomial name
- Eoophyla latipennis Munroe, 1959

Species of moth

Eoophyla latipennis is a moth in the family Crambidae. It was described by Eugene G. Munroe in 1959. It is found on New Guinea.
