= Eoophyla colonialis =

Scientific classification
- Kingdom: Animalia
- Phylum: Arthropoda
- Class: Insecta
- Order: Lepidoptera
- Family: Crambidae
- Genus: Eoophyla
- Species: E. colonialis

Binomial name
- Eoophyla colonialis (Guenée, 1854)

Synonyms
- Oligostigma colonialis Guenée, 1854

Species of moth

Eoophyla colonialis is a moth in the family Crambidae. It was described by Achille Guenée in 1854. It is found in India.
