= Eoophyla ochripicta =

Scientific classification
- Domain: Eukaryota
- Kingdom: Animalia
- Phylum: Arthropoda
- Class: Insecta
- Order: Lepidoptera
- Family: Crambidae
- Genus: Eoophyla
- Species: E. ochripicta

Binomial name
- Eoophyla ochripicta (Moore, 1888)

Synonyms
- Cataclysta ochripicta Moore, 1888

Species of moth

Eoophyla ochripicta is a moth in the family Crambidae. It was described by Frederic Moore in 1888. It is found in India.
