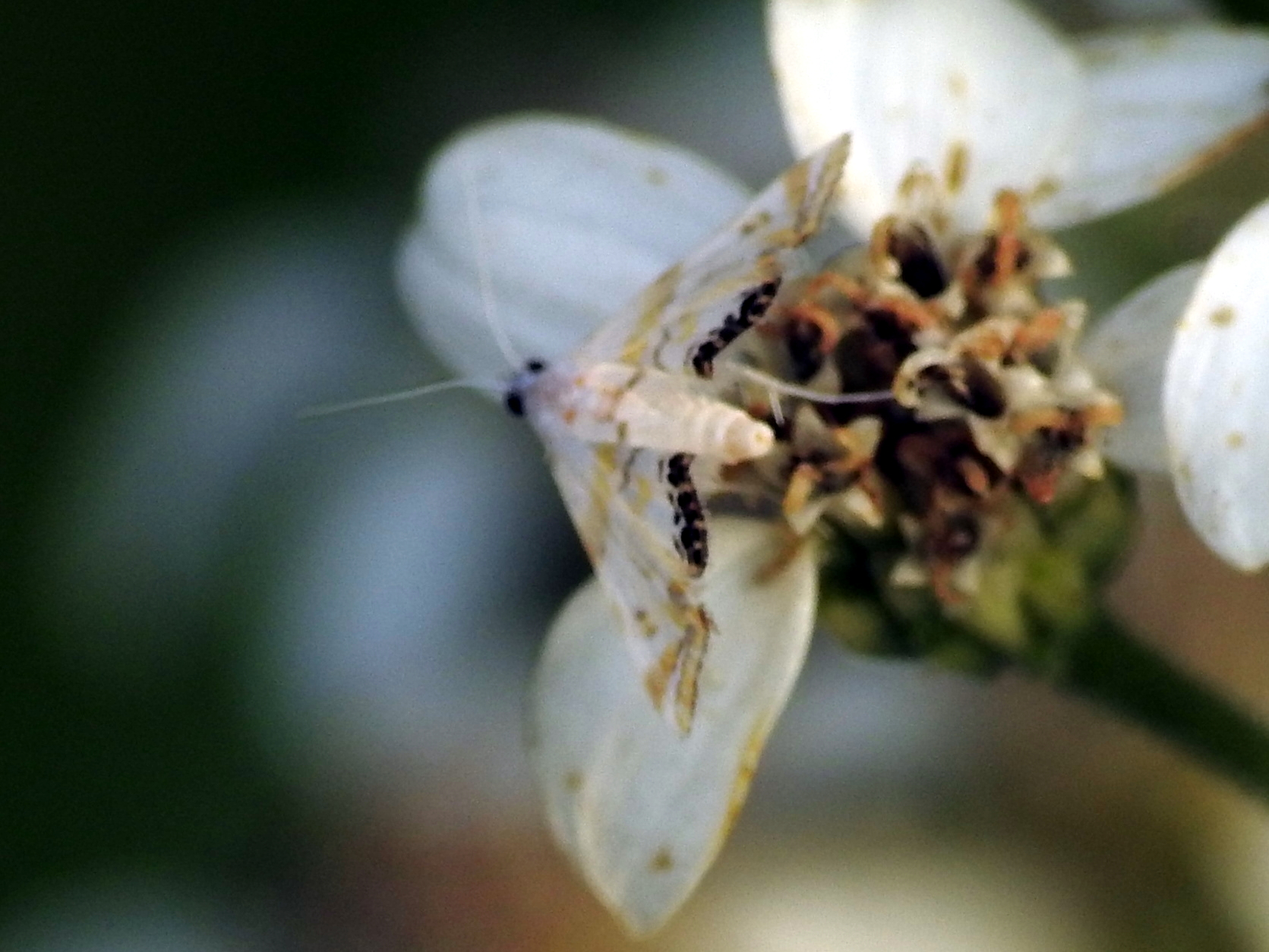

Scientific classification
- Kingdom: Animalia
- Phylum: Arthropoda
- Class: Insecta
- Order: Lepidoptera
- Family: Crambidae
- Genus: Argyractis
- Species: A. drumalis

Binomial name
- Argyractis drumalis (Dyar, 1906)

Synonyms
- Elophila drumalis Dyar, 1906; Petrophila drumalis

= Argyractis drumalis =

Species of moth

Argyractis drumalis is a species of moth in the family Crambidae. It is found in North America, where it has been recorded from Florida.

The length of the forewings is about 5 mm. Adults have been recorded on wing from February to November.

The larvae feed on the roots of Pistia stratiotes and Nymphaea species. They are aquatic.

== Etymology ==
The species is named for Fort Drum, the type location.
