= Trichaetoides albiplaga =

Scientific classification
- Kingdom: Animalia
- Phylum: Arthropoda
- Class: Insecta
- Order: Lepidoptera
- Superfamily: Noctuoidea
- Family: Erebidae
- Subfamily: Arctiinae
- Genus: Trichaetoides
- Species: T. albiplaga

Binomial name
- Trichaetoides albiplaga (Walker, 1862)

Synonyms
- Syntomis albiplaga Walker, 1862; Trichaeta albiplaga; Syntomis albosignata Walker, [1865]

Species of moth

Trichaetoides albiplaga is a moth in the family Erebidae. It was described by Francis Walker in 1862. It is found on Borneo, Peninsular Malaysia and in Thailand. The habitat consists of both lowland and mountainous areas.
