= Theila metallosticha =

Scientific classification
- Kingdom: Animalia
- Phylum: Arthropoda
- Class: Insecta
- Order: Lepidoptera
- Family: Crambidae
- Genus: Theila
- Species: T. metallosticha

Binomial name
- Theila metallosticha (Turner, 1938)

Synonyms
- Diathrausta metallosticha Turner, 1938; Eoophyla metallosticha; Diathraustodes metallosticha Turner, 1942

Species of moth

Theila metallosticha is a species of moth in the family Crambidae. It was described by Turner in 1938. It is found in Australia, where it has been recorded from Queensland.
