= Theila siennata =

Scientific classification
- Kingdom: Animalia
- Phylum: Arthropoda
- Class: Insecta
- Order: Lepidoptera
- Family: Crambidae
- Genus: Theila
- Species: T. siennata

Binomial name
- Theila siennata (Warren, 1896)

Synonyms
- Oligostigma siennata Warren, 1896; Aulacodes siennata

Species of moth

Theila siennata is a species of moth in the family Crambidae. It was described by Warren in 1896. It is found in Australia, where it has been recorded from Queensland.

The larvae feed on the leaves of Hydrilla species.
