= Eoophyla bicolensis =

Scientific classification
- Domain: Eukaryota
- Kingdom: Animalia
- Phylum: Arthropoda
- Class: Insecta
- Order: Lepidoptera
- Family: Crambidae
- Genus: Eoophyla
- Species: E. bicolensis

Binomial name
- Eoophyla bicolensis Speidel, 2003

Species of moth

Eoophyla bicolensis is a moth in the family Crambidae. It was described by Speidel in 2003. It is found in the Philippines (Luzon).
