= Eoophyla cameroonensis =

Scientific classification
- Domain: Eukaryota
- Kingdom: Animalia
- Phylum: Arthropoda
- Class: Insecta
- Order: Lepidoptera
- Family: Crambidae
- Genus: Eoophyla
- Species: E. cameroonensis

Binomial name
- Eoophyla cameroonensis Agassiz, 2012

Species of moth

Eoophyla cameroonensis is a moth in the family Crambidae. It was described by David John Lawrence Agassiz in 2012. It is found in Cameroon, where it is only known from the lowlands.

The wingspan is about 19 mm.
