= Eoophyla platyxantha =

Scientific classification
- Domain: Eukaryota
- Kingdom: Animalia
- Phylum: Arthropoda
- Class: Insecta
- Order: Lepidoptera
- Family: Crambidae
- Genus: Eoophyla
- Species: E. platyxantha

Binomial name
- Eoophyla platyxantha Agassiz, 2012

Species of moth

Eoophyla platyxantha is a moth in the family Crambidae. It was described by David John Lawrence Agassiz in 2012. It is found in Cameroon and the Democratic Republic of the Congo.

The wingspan is 14–17 mm.
