= Eoophyla tanzanica =

Scientific classification
- Domain: Eukaryota
- Kingdom: Animalia
- Phylum: Arthropoda
- Class: Insecta
- Order: Lepidoptera
- Family: Crambidae
- Genus: Eoophyla
- Species: E. tanzanica

Binomial name
- Eoophyla tanzanica Agassiz, 2012

Species of moth

Eoophyla tanzanica is a moth in the family Crambidae. It was described by David John Lawrence Agassiz in 2012. It is found in Tanzania.

The wingspan is 12–20 mm.

== Etymology ==
The species is named for Tanzania, the country where the species is found.
