= Eoophyla euprepialis =

Scientific classification
- Domain: Eukaryota
- Kingdom: Animalia
- Phylum: Arthropoda
- Class: Insecta
- Order: Lepidoptera
- Family: Crambidae
- Genus: Eoophyla
- Species: E. euprepialis

Binomial name
- Eoophyla euprepialis Agassiz, 2012

Species of moth

Eoophyla euprepialis is a moth in the family Crambidae. It was described by David John Lawrence Agassiz in 2012. It is found in the Democratic Republic of the Congo and Tanzania.

The wingspan is 14–18 mm.

== Etymology ==
The species name is derived from Greek euprepes (meaning beautiful).
