= Theila fusconebulalis =

Scientific classification
- Kingdom: Animalia
- Phylum: Arthropoda
- Class: Insecta
- Order: Lepidoptera
- Family: Crambidae
- Genus: Theila
- Species: T. fusconebulalis

Binomial name
- Theila fusconebulalis (Marion, 1954)

Synonyms
- Ambahona fusconebulalis Marion, 1954

Species of moth

Theila fusconebulalis is a species of moth in the family Crambidae. It was described by Hubert Marion in 1954. It is found on Madagascar.
