= Eoophyla assegaia =

Scientific classification
- Kingdom: Animalia
- Phylum: Arthropoda
- Clade: Pancrustacea
- Class: Insecta
- Order: Lepidoptera
- Family: Crambidae
- Genus: Eoophyla
- Species: E. assegaia

Binomial name
- Eoophyla assegaia Mey, 2011

Species of moth

Eoophyla assegaia is a moth in the family Crambidae. It was described by Wolfram Mey in 2011. It is found in South Africa.
