= Argyractis coloralis =

Scientific classification
- Kingdom: Animalia
- Phylum: Arthropoda
- Class: Insecta
- Order: Lepidoptera
- Family: Crambidae
- Genus: Argyractis
- Species: A. coloralis

Binomial name
- Argyractis coloralis (Guenée, 1854)

Synonyms
- Cataclysta coloralis Guenée, 1854

Species of moth

Argyractis coloralis is a species of moth in the family Crambidae. It was described by Achille Guenée in 1854 and is found in Madagascar and Mauritius.
