= Eoophyla simplicialis =

Scientific classification
- Kingdom: Animalia
- Phylum: Arthropoda
- Class: Insecta
- Order: Lepidoptera
- Family: Crambidae
- Genus: Eoophyla
- Species: E. simplicialis

Binomial name
- Eoophyla simplicialis (Snellen, 1876)

Synonyms
- Oligostigma simplicialis Snellen, 1876; Oligostigma simplicialis f. rufalis Caradja, 1938

Species of moth

Eoophyla simplicialis is a moth in the family Crambidae. It was described by Snellen in 1876. It is found on Java and in China.

== Subspecies ==
- Eoophyla simplicialis simplicialis (Java)
- Eoophyla simplicialis rufalis (Caradja, 1938) (China)
