= Eoophyla tetropalis =

Scientific classification
- Kingdom: Animalia
- Phylum: Arthropoda
- Class: Insecta
- Order: Lepidoptera
- Family: Crambidae
- Genus: Eoophyla
- Species: E. tetropalis

Binomial name
- Eoophyla tetropalis (Hampson, 1906)

Synonyms
- Argyractis tetropalis Hampson, 1906

Species of moth

Eoophyla tetropalis is a moth in the family Crambidae. It was described by George Hampson in 1906. It is found in Cameroon, Ghana, Ivory Coast, Kenya, Nigeria, Sierra Leone and Uganda.

The wingspan is 9–16 millimetres (0.35–0.63 in). Adults have been recorded on wing from April to July, September and from November to February.
