= Trichaetoides =

Scientific classification
- Kingdom: Animalia
- Phylum: Arthropoda
- Clade: Pancrustacea
- Class: Insecta
- Order: Lepidoptera
- Superfamily: Noctuoidea
- Family: Erebidae
- Subfamily: Arctiinae
- Tribe: Syntomini
- Genus: Trichaetoides; Holloway, 1988

Genus of moths

Trichaetoides is a genus of moths in the family Erebidae erected by Jeremy Daniel Holloway in 1988.

== Species ==
- Trichaetoides albifrontalis (Pagenstecher, 1885)
- Trichaetoides albiplaga (Walker, 1862)
- Trichaetoides apicalis (Walker, 1856)
- Trichaetoides borealis Rothschild, 1912
- Trichaetoides chloroleuca (Walker, 1859)
- Trichaetoides divisura (Walker, 1862)
- Trichaetoides hosei (Rothschild, 1910)
- Trichaetoides separabilis (Walker, 1862)
