= Eoophyla principensis =

Scientific classification
- Kingdom: Animalia
- Phylum: Arthropoda
- Clade: Pancrustacea
- Class: Insecta
- Order: Lepidoptera
- Family: Crambidae
- Genus: Eoophyla
- Species: E. principensis

Binomial name
- Eoophyla principensis Agassiz, 2012

Species of moth

Eoophyla principensis is a moth in the family Crambidae. It was described by David John Lawrence Agassiz in 2012. It is found on the island of Príncipe in São Tomé and Príncipe off the west coast of Africa.

The wingspan is about 11 mm.

== Etymology ==
The species name refers to Príncipe, the type locality.
