= Argyractis lophosomalis =

Scientific classification
- Kingdom: Animalia
- Phylum: Arthropoda
- Class: Insecta
- Order: Lepidoptera
- Family: Crambidae
- Genus: Argyractis
- Species: A. lophosomalis

Binomial name
- Argyractis lophosomalis Hampson, 1906

Species of moth

Argyractis lophosomalis is a species of moth in the family Crambidae. It is found in Brazil.
