= Noctuides melanochyta =

Scientific classification
- Kingdom: Animalia
- Phylum: Arthropoda
- Class: Insecta
- Order: Lepidoptera
- Family: Pyralidae
- Genus: Noctuides
- Species: N. melanochyta

Binomial name
- Noctuides melanochyta (Meyrick, 1933)

Synonyms
- Anartula melanochyta Meyrick, 1933

Species of moth

Noctuides melanochyta is a species of snout moth in the genus Noctuides. It is known from Zaire (including Katakumba, the type location).
