= Trichaetoides apicalis =

Scientific classification
- Kingdom: Animalia
- Phylum: Arthropoda
- Class: Insecta
- Order: Lepidoptera
- Superfamily: Noctuoidea
- Family: Erebidae
- Subfamily: Arctiinae
- Genus: Trichaetoides
- Species: T. apicalis

Binomial name
- Trichaetoides apicalis (Walker, 1856)

Synonyms
- Tipulodes apicalis Walker, 1856; Syntomis flaviplaga Walker, 1862; Syntomis biplagata Snellen, 1880

Species of moth

Trichaetoides apicalis is a moth in the family Erebidae. It was described by Francis Walker in 1856. It is found on Sumatra and Borneo.
