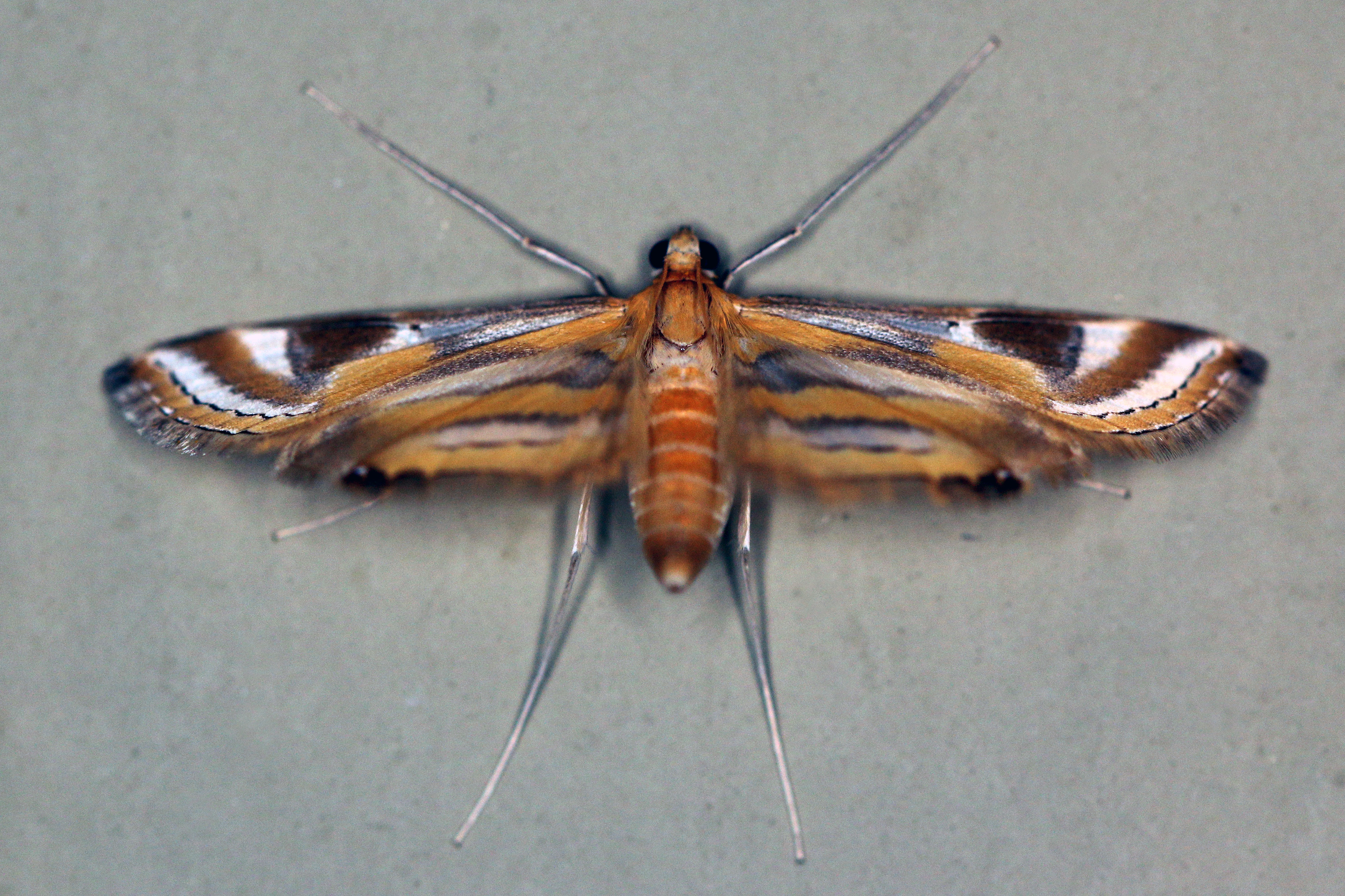
- In Sabah, Borneo

Scientific classification
- Kingdom: Animalia
- Phylum: Arthropoda
- Class: Insecta
- Order: Lepidoptera
- Family: Crambidae
- Genus: Eoophyla; C. Swinhoe, 1900

Synonyms
- Theila C. Swinhoe, 1900

= Eoophyla =

Genus of moths

Eoophyla is a genus of moths of the family Crambidae. It was erected by Charles Swinhoe in 1900.

== Species ==
- angustalis species group
  - Eoophyla angustalis Sauber in Semper, 1902
  - Eoophyla becki Mey, 2009
  - Eoophyla fontis Speidel, 2003
  - Eoophyla liwaguensis Mey, 2009
  - Eoophyla nussi Speidel, 2003
- ceratucha species group
  - Eoophyla boernickei Mey, 2006
  - Eoophyla ceratucha Meyrick, 1894
  - Eoophyla continentalis Jaenicke & Mey, 2011
  - Eoophyla corniculata Jaenicke & Mey, 2011
  - Eoophyla nigripilosa Yoshiyasu, 1987
  - Eoophyla profalcatalis Jaenicke & Mey, 2011
  - Eoophyla promiscuata Jaenicke & Mey, 2011
  - Eoophyla silvicola Jaenicke & Mey, 2011
  - Eoophyla sumatroceratucha Jaenicke & Mey, 2011
- crassicornalis species group
  - Eoophyla adjunctalis Snellen, 1895
  - Eoophyla aureolalis Snellen, 1876
  - Eoophyla bipunctalis Walker, 1866
  - Eoophyla callilithalis Speidel, 2003
  - Eoophyla clasnaumanni Speidel & Mey in Mey & Speidel, 2005
  - Eoophyla colonialis Guenée, 1854
  - Eoophyla crassicornalis Guenée, 1854
  - Eoophyla latifascialis Snellen, 1876
  - Eoophyla mindanensis Speidel, 1998
  - Eoophyla myanmarica Mey & Speidel, 2005
  - Eoophyla philippinensis Speidel, 1998
  - Eoophyla polydora Meyrick, 1897
- gibbosalis species group
  - Eoophyla cocos Mey, 2009
  - Eoophyla gibbosalis Guenée, 1854
  - Eoophyla hamalis Snellen, 1876
  - Eoophyla hirsuta Semper, 1899
  - Eoophyla mimeticalis Caradja, 1925
  - Eoophyla ochripicta Moore, 1888
  - Eoophyla parapomasalis Hampson, 1897
  - Eoophyla saturatalis Snellen, 1890
  - Eoophyla simplicialis Snellen, 1876
  - Eoophyla sinensis Hampson, 1897
- litoralis species group
  - Eoophyla litoralis Speidel, 2003
  - Eoophyla montanalis Speidel, 2003
- peribocalis species group
  - Eoophyla conjunctalis Wileman & South, 1917
  - Eoophyla dominalis Walker, 1866
  - Eoophyla ectopalis Hampson, 1906
  - Eoophyla halialis Walker, 1859
  - Eoophyla inouei Yoshiyasu, 1979
  - Eoophyla melanops Hampson, 1896
  - Eoophyla mormodes Meyrick, 1897
  - Eoophyla nectalis Snellen, 1876
  - Eoophyla sejunctalis Snellen, 1876
  - Eoophyla thaiensis Yoshiyasu, 1987
- quinqualis species group
  - Eoophyla argyropis Meyrick, 1894
  - Eoophyla basilissa Meyrick, 1894
  - Eoophyla bicolensis Speidel, 2003
  - Eoophyla gephyrotis Meyrick, 1897
  - Eoophyla quezonensis Speidel, 2003
  - Eoophyla quinqualis Snellen, 1892
  - Eoophyla richteri Speidel, 2003
  - Eoophyla yeni Speidel, 2003
- schintlmeisteri species group
  - Eoophyla cernyi Speidel, 2003
  - Eoophyla cervinalis Speidel, 2003
  - Eoophyla leytensis Speidel, 2003
  - Eoophyla napoleoni Speidel, 2003
  - Eoophyla schintlmeisteri Speidel, 2003
- simplex species group
  - Eoophyla naumanni Speidel, 2003
  - Eoophyla simplex West, 1931
- snelleni species group
  - Eoophyla pulchralis Speidel, 2003
  - Eoophyla snelleni Semper, 1902
- unknown species group
  - Eoophyla abstrusa Li, You & Wang, 2003
  - Eoophyla accra Strand, 1913
  - Eoophyla acroperalis Hampson, 1897
  - Eoophyla argenteopicta Hampson, 1917
  - Eoophyla argentimaculalis Hampson, 1917
  - Eoophyla argyrilinale Hampson, 1897
  - Eoophyla argyrotoxalis Pagenstecher, 1886
  - Eoophyla assegaia Mey, 2011
  - Eoophyla aurantipennis Hampson, 1917
  - Eoophyla belladotae Agassiz, 2012
  - Eoophyla brunnealis Hampson, 1897
  - Eoophyla cameroonensis Agassiz, 2012
  - Eoophyla candidalis Pagenstecher, 1886
  - Eoophyla capensis Hampson, 1906
  - Eoophyla carcassoni Agassiz, 2012
  - Eoophyla cervinalis Hampson, 1897
  - Eoophyla chrysoxantha Hampson, 1917
  - Eoophyla citrialis Agassiz, 2012
  - Eoophyla coniferalis Hampson, 1917
  - Eoophyla costifascialis Hampson, 1917
  - Eoophyla cyclozonalis Hampson, 1906
  - Eoophyla dendrophila Speidel, Mey & Schulze, 2002
  - Eoophyla dentisigna Agassiz, 2012
  - Eoophyla diopsalis Hampson, 1897
  - Eoophyla discalis Hampson, 1906
  - Eoophyla dolichoplagia Hampson, 1917
  - Eoophyla dominulalis Walker, 1866
  - Eoophyla euprepialis Agassiz, 2012
  - Eoophyla euryxantha Meyrick, 1936
  - Eoophyla evidens Li, You & Wang in Li, You & Wang, 2003
  - Eoophyla excentrica Mey & Speidel, 1999
  - Eoophyla flavifascialis Hampson, 1917
  - Eoophyla fuscicostalis Rothschild, 1915
  - Eoophyla goniophoralis Hampson, 1906
  - Eoophyla grandifuscalis Agassiz, 2012
  - Eoophyla guillermetorum Viette, 1988
  - Eoophyla hauensteini Speidel & Mey, 1999
  - Eoophyla hemicryptis Meyrick, 1897
  - Eoophyla hemimelaena Hampson, 1917
  - Eoophyla hemithermalis Hampson, 1917
  - Eoophyla heptopis Hampson, 1897
  - Eoophyla idiotis Meyrick, 1894
  - Eoophyla intensa Rothschild, 1915
  - Eoophyla interopalis Agassiz, 2012
  - Eoophyla junctiscriptalis Hampson, 1897
  - Eoophyla kingstoni Agassiz, 2012
  - Eoophyla latifascia Munroe, 1959
  - Eoophyla latipennis Munroe, 1959
  - Eoophyla leroii Strand, 1915
  - Eoophyla leucostola Hampson, 1917
  - Eoophyla leucostrialis Hampson, 1906
  - Eoophyla limalis Viette, 1957
  - Eoophyla longiplagialis Hampson, 1917
  - Eoophyla mediofascialis Hampson, 1917
  - Eoophyla menglensis Li, An, Li & Liu, 1995
  - Eoophyla mesoscialis Hampson, 1917
  - Eoophyla metataxalis Hampson, 1906
  - Eoophyla metazonalis Hampson, 1917
  - Eoophyla metriodora Meyrick, 1897
  - Eoophyla mimicalis Hampson, 1917
  - Eoophyla munroei Agassiz & Mey, 2011
  - Eoophyla nandinalis Hampson, 1906
  - Eoophyla nigerialis Hampson, 1906
  - Eoophyla nigriplagialis Hampson, 1917
  - Eoophyla nyasalis Hampson, 1917
  - Eoophyla nymphulalis Hampson, 1906
  - Eoophyla obliquivitta Hampson, 1917
  - Eoophyla obliquivitta Hampson, 1917
  - Eoophyla orphninalis Pagenstecher, 1886
  - Eoophyla ovomaculalis Rothschild, 1915
  - Eoophyla palleuca Hampson, 1906 (formerly E. lobophoralis species group)
  - Eoophyla pentopalis Hampson, 1906
  - Eoophyla persimilis Munroe, 1959
  - Eoophyla pervenustalis Hampson, 1897
  - Eoophyla piscatorum Agassiz, 2012
  - Eoophyla platyxantha Agassiz, 2012
  - Eoophyla postbasalis Rothschild, 1915
  - Eoophyla praestabilis Pagenstecher, 1886
  - Eoophyla principensis Agassiz, 2012
  - Eoophyla pulchralis Rothschild, 1915
  - Eoophyla quadriplagiata Hampson, 1917
  - Eoophyla reunionalis Viette, 1988
  - Eoophyla rufocastanea Rothschild, 1915
  - Eoophyla ruwenzoriensis Agassiz, 2012
  - Eoophyla scioxantha Meyrick, 1937
  - Eoophyla similis Rothschild, 1915
  - Eoophyla stepheni Agassiz, 2012
  - Eoophyla stresemanni Rothschild, 1915
  - Eoophyla tanzanica Agassiz, 2012
  - Eoophyla tetropalis Hampson, 1906
  - Eoophyla thermichrysia Hampson, 1917
  - Eoophyla thomasi Munroe, 1959
  - Eoophyla trichoceralis Hampson, 1897
  - Eoophyla tripletale Hampson, 1897
  - Eoophyla tripunctalis Snellen, 1872
  - Eoophyla uniplagialis Rothschild, 1915
  - Eoophyla waigaoalis C. Swinhoe, 1900
  - Eoophyla wollastoni Rothschild, 1915

== Former species ==
- Eoophyla alba Mey, 2009
- Eoophyla falcatalis Snellen, 1901
- Eoophyla lithocharis Meyrick, 1936
- Eoophyla peribocalis Walker, 1859
- Eoophyla periopis Hampson, 1910
- Eoophyla sambesica Strand, 1909
