= Oxyelophila necomalis =

Scientific classification
- Kingdom: Animalia
- Phylum: Arthropoda
- Class: Insecta
- Order: Lepidoptera
- Family: Crambidae
- Genus: Oxyelophila
- Species: O. necomalis

Binomial name
- Oxyelophila necomalis (Dyar, 1914)

Synonyms
- Argyractis necomalis Dyar, 1914

Species of moth

Oxyelophila necomalis is a species of moth in the family Crambidae. It was described by Harrison Gray Dyar Jr. in 1914. It is found in Panama.
