= Eoophyla guillermetorum =

Scientific classification
- Kingdom: Animalia
- Phylum: Arthropoda
- Class: Insecta
- Order: Lepidoptera
- Family: Crambidae
- Genus: Eoophyla
- Species: E. guillermetorum

Binomial name
- Eoophyla guillermetorum (Viette, 1988)

Synonyms
- Theila guillermetorum Viette, 1988

Species of moth

Eoophyla guillermetorum is a moth in the family Crambidae. It was described by Viette in 1988. It is found on La Réunion.
