= Eoophyla evidens =

Scientific classification
- Domain: Eukaryota
- Kingdom: Animalia
- Phylum: Arthropoda
- Class: Insecta
- Order: Lepidoptera
- Family: Crambidae
- Genus: Eoophyla
- Species: E. evidens

Binomial name
- Eoophyla evidens Li, You & Wang in Li, You & Wang, 2003

Species of moth

Eoophyla evidens is a moth in the family Crambidae. It was described by Hou-Hun Li, Ping You and Shu-Xia Wang in 2003. It is found in Guangxi, China.
