= Eoophyla discalis =

Scientific classification
- Kingdom: Animalia
- Phylum: Arthropoda
- Class: Insecta
- Order: Lepidoptera
- Family: Crambidae
- Genus: Eoophyla
- Species: E. discalis

Binomial name
- Eoophyla discalis (Hampson, 1906)

Synonyms
- Oligostigma discalis Hampson, 1906

Species of moth

Eoophyla discalis is a moth in the family Crambidae. It was described by George Hampson in 1906. It is found on Sulawesi in Indonesia.
