= Eoophyla quadriplagiata =

Scientific classification
- Kingdom: Animalia
- Phylum: Arthropoda
- Class: Insecta
- Order: Lepidoptera
- Family: Crambidae
- Genus: Eoophyla
- Species: E. quadriplagiata

Binomial name
- Eoophyla quadriplagiata (Hampson, 1917)

Synonyms
- Aulacodes quadriplagiata Hampson, 1917

Species of moth

Eoophyla quadriplagiata is a moth in the family Crambidae. It was described by George Hampson in 1917. It is found on the D'Entrecasteaux Islands and Goodenough Island.
