= Argyractis argentilinealis =

Scientific classification
- Kingdom: Animalia
- Phylum: Arthropoda
- Class: Insecta
- Order: Lepidoptera
- Family: Crambidae
- Genus: Argyractis
- Species: A. argentilinealis

Binomial name
- Argyractis argentilinealis Hampson, 1897

Species of moth

Argyractis argentilinealis is a species of moth in the family Crambidae described by George Hampson in 1897. It is found in Espírito Santo, Brazil.
