= Eoophyla hamalis =

Scientific classification
- Kingdom: Animalia
- Phylum: Arthropoda
- Class: Insecta
- Order: Lepidoptera
- Family: Crambidae
- Genus: Eoophyla
- Species: E. hamalis

Binomial name
- Eoophyla hamalis (Snellen, 1875)

Synonyms
- Oligostigma hamalis Snellen, 1875

Species of moth

Eoophyla hamalis is a moth in the family Crambidae. It was described by Pieter Cornelius Tobias Snellen in 1875. It was found in Dharmsala, India.
