= Noctuides thurivora =

Scientific classification
- Kingdom: Animalia
- Phylum: Arthropoda
- Class: Insecta
- Order: Lepidoptera
- Family: Pyralidae
- Genus: Noctuides
- Species: N. thurivora

Binomial name
- Noctuides thurivora (Meyrick, 1932)

Synonyms
- Anartula thurivora Meyrick, 1932

Species of moth

Noctuides thurivora is a species of snout moth in the genus Noctuides. It is known from Sri Lanka (including Galle, the type location).
