= Eoophyla melanops =

Scientific classification
- Kingdom: Animalia
- Phylum: Arthropoda
- Class: Insecta
- Order: Lepidoptera
- Family: Crambidae
- Genus: Eoophyla
- Species: E. melanops

Binomial name
- Eoophyla melanops (Hampson, 1896)

Synonyms
- Aulacodes melanops Hampson, 1896

Species of moth

Eoophyla melanops is a moth in the family Crambidae. It was described by George Hampson in 1896. It is found in Sikkim, India.
