= Eoophyla philippinensis =

Scientific classification
- Kingdom: Animalia
- Phylum: Arthropoda
- Clade: Pancrustacea
- Class: Insecta
- Order: Lepidoptera
- Family: Crambidae
- Genus: Eoophyla
- Species: E. philippinensis

Binomial name
- Eoophyla philippinensis Speidel, 1998

Species of moth

Eoophyla philippinensis is a moth in the family Crambidae. It was described by Speidel in 1998. It is found on Mindanao, Philippines.
