= Trichaetoides borealis =

Scientific classification
- Domain: Eukaryota
- Kingdom: Animalia
- Phylum: Arthropoda
- Class: Insecta
- Order: Lepidoptera
- Superfamily: Noctuoidea
- Family: Erebidae
- Subfamily: Arctiinae
- Genus: Trichaetoides
- Species: T. borealis

Binomial name
- Trichaetoides borealis (Rothschild, 1912)

Synonyms
- Trichaeta albifrontia borealis Rothschild, 1912

Species of moth

Trichaetoides borealis is a moth in the family Erebidae. It was described by Walter Rothschild in 1912. It is found on Borneo. The habitat consists of dry and wet heath forests and possibly swamp forests.
