= Eoophyla quinqualis =

Scientific classification
- Kingdom: Animalia
- Phylum: Arthropoda
- Class: Insecta
- Order: Lepidoptera
- Family: Crambidae
- Genus: Eoophyla
- Species: E. quinqualis

Binomial name
- Eoophyla quinqualis (Snellen, 1892)

Synonyms
- Oligostigma quinqualis Snellen, 1892; Oligostigma quinquinalis Klima, 1937

Species of moth

Eoophyla quinqualis is a moth in the family Crambidae. It was described by Snellen in 1892. It is found on Sulawesi and Java.
