= Eoophyla inouei =

Scientific classification
- Domain: Eukaryota
- Kingdom: Animalia
- Phylum: Arthropoda
- Class: Insecta
- Order: Lepidoptera
- Family: Crambidae
- Genus: Eoophyla
- Species: E. inouei

Binomial name
- Eoophyla inouei Yoshiyasu, 1979

Species of moth

Eoophyla inouei is a moth in the family Crambidae. It was described by Yoshiyasu in 1979. It is found in Japan (the Ryukyus).
