= Eoophyla mormodes =

Scientific classification
- Kingdom: Animalia
- Phylum: Arthropoda
- Class: Insecta
- Order: Lepidoptera
- Family: Crambidae
- Genus: Eoophyla
- Species: E. mormodes

Binomial name
- Eoophyla mormodes (Meyrick, 1897)

Synonyms
- Oligostigma mormodes Meyrick, 1897

Species of moth

Eoophyla mormodes is a moth in the family Crambidae. It was described by Snellen in 1897. It is found on the Sangihe Islands.
