= Eoophyla hirsuta =

Scientific classification
- Domain: Eukaryota
- Kingdom: Animalia
- Phylum: Arthropoda
- Class: Insecta
- Order: Lepidoptera
- Family: Crambidae
- Genus: Eoophyla
- Species: E. hirsuta

Binomial name
- Eoophyla hirsuta (Semper, 1899)

Synonyms
- Theila hirsuta Semper, 1899

Species of moth

Eoophyla hirsuta is a moth in the family Crambidae. It was described by Georg Semper in 1899. It is found on Luzon in the Philippines.
