= Noctuides circumlucens =

Scientific classification
- Kingdom: Animalia
- Phylum: Arthropoda
- Class: Insecta
- Order: Lepidoptera
- Family: Pyralidae
- Genus: Noctuides
- Species: N. circumlucens

Binomial name
- Noctuides circumlucens (Dyar, 1914)

Synonyms
- Arnatula circumlucens Dyar, 1914

Species of moth

Noctuides circumlucens is a species of snout moth in the genus Noctuides. It was described by Harrison Gray Dyar Jr. in 1914. It is found in Panama.
