= Eoophyla excentrica =

Scientific classification
- Kingdom: Animalia
- Phylum: Arthropoda
- Clade: Pancrustacea
- Class: Insecta
- Order: Lepidoptera
- Family: Crambidae
- Genus: Eoophyla
- Species: E. excentrica

Binomial name
- Eoophyla excentrica Mey & Speidel, 1999

Species of moth

Eoophyla excentrica is a moth in the family Crambidae. It was described by Wolfram Mey and Wolfgang Speidel in 1999. It is found in Yemen, Saudi Arabia, Ethiopia, Kenya, Tanzania and Uganda.

The wingspan is 15–22 mm. Adults have been recorded on wing in February, April, May, July, August, November, and December.
