= Eoophyla kingstoni =

Scientific classification
- Domain: Eukaryota
- Kingdom: Animalia
- Phylum: Arthropoda
- Class: Insecta
- Order: Lepidoptera
- Family: Crambidae
- Genus: Eoophyla
- Species: E. kingstoni

Binomial name
- Eoophyla kingstoni Agassiz, 2012

Species of moth

Eoophyla kingstoni is a moth in the family Crambidae. It was described by David John Lawrence Agassiz in 2012. It is found in Malawi.

The wingspan is 12–13 mm.

== Etymology ==
The species is named for Tony Kingston, who collected the species.
