= Eoophyla mediofascialis =

Scientific classification
- Kingdom: Animalia
- Phylum: Arthropoda
- Class: Insecta
- Order: Lepidoptera
- Family: Crambidae
- Genus: Eoophyla
- Species: E. mediofascialis

Binomial name
- Eoophyla mediofascialis (Hampson, 1917)

Synonyms
- Aulacodes mediofascialis Hampson, 1917

Species of moth

Eoophyla mediofascialis is a moth in the family Crambidae. It was described by George Hampson in 1917. It's found on New Guinea.
