= Argyractis parthenodalis =

Scientific classification
- Kingdom: Animalia
- Phylum: Arthropoda
- Class: Insecta
- Order: Lepidoptera
- Family: Crambidae
- Genus: Argyractis
- Species: A. parthenodalis

Binomial name
- Argyractis parthenodalis Hampson, 1906

Species of moth

Argyractis parthenodalis is a species of moth in the family Crambidae. It is found in Argentina.
