= Trichaetoides separabilis =

Scientific classification
- Kingdom: Animalia
- Phylum: Arthropoda
- Class: Insecta
- Order: Lepidoptera
- Superfamily: Noctuoidea
- Family: Erebidae
- Subfamily: Arctiinae
- Genus: Trichaetoides
- Species: T. separabilis

Binomial name
- Trichaetoides separabilis (Walker, 1862)

Synonyms
- Syntomis separabilis Walker, 1862

Species of moth

Trichaetoides separabilis is a moth in the family Erebidae. It was described by Francis Walker in 1862. It is found on Borneo. The habitat consists of lowland alluvial forests and dipterocarp forests.
