= Eoophyla bipunctalis =

Scientific classification
- Kingdom: Animalia
- Phylum: Arthropoda
- Class: Insecta
- Order: Lepidoptera
- Family: Crambidae
- Genus: Eoophyla
- Species: E. bipunctalis

Binomial name
- Eoophyla bipunctalis (Walker, 1866)

Synonyms
- Oligostigma bipunctalis Walker, 1866

Species of moth

Eoophyla bipunctalis is a moth in the family Crambidae. It was described by Francis Walker in 1866. It is found on Java.
