= Eoophyla myanmarica =

Scientific classification
- Kingdom: Animalia
- Phylum: Arthropoda
- Clade: Pancrustacea
- Class: Insecta
- Order: Lepidoptera
- Family: Crambidae
- Genus: Eoophyla
- Species: E. myanmarica

Binomial name
- Eoophyla myanmarica Mey & Speidel, 2005

Species of moth

Eoophyla myanmarica is a moth in the family Crambidae. It was described by Wolfram Mey and Wolfgang Speidel in 2005. It is found in Myanmar.
