= Eoophyla argyropis =

Scientific classification
- Kingdom: Animalia
- Phylum: Arthropoda
- Class: Insecta
- Order: Lepidoptera
- Family: Crambidae
- Genus: Eoophyla
- Species: E. argyropis

Binomial name
- Eoophyla argyropis (Meyrick, 1894)

Synonyms
- Oligostigma argyropis Meyrick, 1894

Species of moth

Eoophyla argyropis is a moth in the family Crambidae. It was described by Edward Meyrick in 1894. It is found on Sulawesi.
