= Eoophyla ceratucha =

Scientific classification
- Kingdom: Animalia
- Phylum: Arthropoda
- Class: Insecta
- Order: Lepidoptera
- Family: Crambidae
- Genus: Eoophyla
- Species: E. ceratucha

Binomial name
- Eoophyla ceratucha (Meyrick, 1894)

Synonyms
- Oligostigma ceratucha Meyrick, 1894; Oligostigma falcatalis Snellen, 1901

Species of moth

Eoophyla ceratucha is a moth in the family Crambidae. It was described by Edward Meyrick in 1894. It is found on Borneo, Sumatra and Java.

The forewings are shining white with a fuscous costal streak from the base to the middle. There is a broad ochreous-yellow dorsal streak from the base to the anal angle, enclosing a narrow fuscous dorsal streak towards the middle. There is a fuscous triangular blotch on the costa beyond the middle, as well as a yellow-ochreous streak, suffused with fuscous posteriorly. The hindwings are ochreous yellow with a white fuscous-edged fascia before the middle, a white fascia beyond the middle, edged anteriorly with fuscous and posteriorly with black.
