= Eoophyla carcassoni =

Scientific classification
- Domain: Eukaryota
- Kingdom: Animalia
- Phylum: Arthropoda
- Class: Insecta
- Order: Lepidoptera
- Family: Crambidae
- Genus: Eoophyla
- Species: E. carcassoni

Binomial name
- Eoophyla carcassoni Agassiz, 2012

Species of moth

Eoophyla carcassoni is a moth in the family Crambidae. It was described by David John Lawrence Agassiz in 2012. It is found in Kenya.

The wingspan is 15–18 mm. Adults have been recorded on wing in June, August and November.

== Etymology ==
The species is named in honour of Robert Herbert Carcasson, who first collected the species.
