= Theila triplaga =

Scientific classification
- Kingdom: Animalia
- Phylum: Arthropoda
- Class: Insecta
- Order: Lepidoptera
- Family: Crambidae
- Genus: Theila
- Species: T. triplaga

Binomial name
- Theila triplaga (Lower, 1903)

Synonyms
- Aulacodes triplaga Lower, 1903

Species of moth

Theila triplaga is a species of moth in the family Crambidae. It was described by Oswald Bertram Lower in 1903. It is found in Australia, where it has been recorded from Queensland and Western Australia.

The forewings are white with yellow markings. The hindwings are white with a row of black dots along the margin.
