= Argyractis iasusalis =

Scientific classification
- Kingdom: Animalia
- Phylum: Arthropoda
- Class: Insecta
- Order: Lepidoptera
- Family: Crambidae
- Genus: Argyractis
- Species: A. iasusalis

Binomial name
- Argyractis iasusalis (Walker, 1859)

Synonyms
- Oligostigma iasusalis Walker, 1859; Cataclysta phoxopteralis Snellen, 1901

Species of moth

Argyractis iasusalis is a species of moth in the family Crambidae. It is found in Brazil.
