= Eoophyla snelleni =

Scientific classification
- Domain: Eukaryota
- Kingdom: Animalia
- Phylum: Arthropoda
- Class: Insecta
- Order: Lepidoptera
- Family: Crambidae
- Genus: Eoophyla
- Species: E. snelleni

Binomial name
- Eoophyla snelleni (Semper, 1902)

Synonyms
- Eoophyla snelleni Semper, 1902; Aulacodes splendens West, 1931

Species of moth

Eoophyla snelleni is a moth in the family Crambidae. It was described by Georg Semper in 1902. It is found on Luzon in the Philippines.
