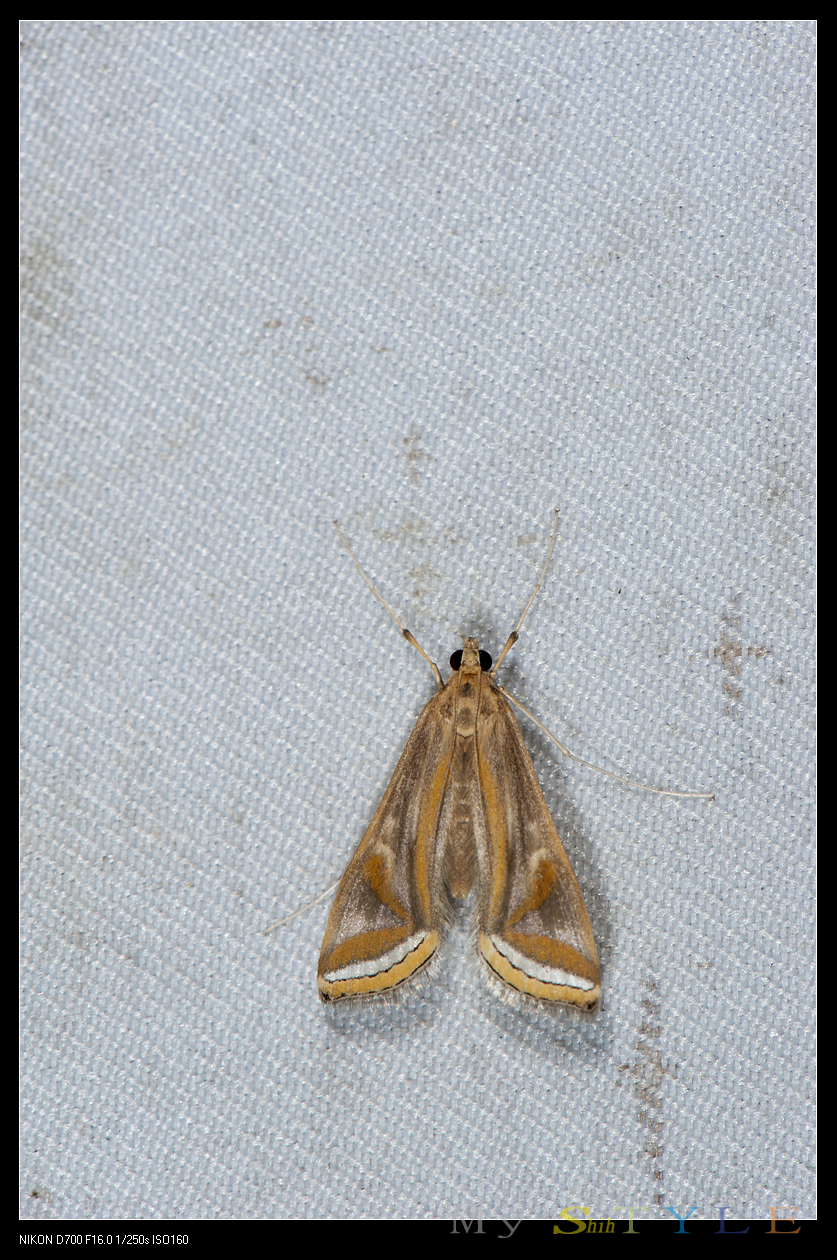

Scientific classification
- Kingdom: Animalia
- Phylum: Arthropoda
- Class: Insecta
- Order: Lepidoptera
- Family: Crambidae
- Genus: Eoophyla
- Species: E. gibbosalis

Binomial name
- Eoophyla gibbosalis (Guenée, 1854)

Synonyms
- Oligostigma gibbosalis Guenée, 1854; Oligostigma plicatalis Walker, [1866]; Oligostigma tripunctalis Walker, [1866]

= Eoophyla gibbosalis =

Species of moth

Eoophyla gibbosalis is a moth in the family Crambidae. It was described by Achille Guenée in 1854. It is found on Sulawesi and Java and in Sri Lanka.
