= Eoophyla pervenustalis =

Scientific classification
- Kingdom: Animalia
- Phylum: Arthropoda
- Class: Insecta
- Order: Lepidoptera
- Family: Crambidae
- Genus: Eoophyla
- Species: E. pervenustalis

Binomial name
- Eoophyla pervenustalis (Hampson, 1897)

Synonyms
- Cataclysta pervenustalis Hampson, 1897

Species of moth

Eoophyla pervenustalis is a species of moth in the family Crambidae. It was described by George Hampson in 1897. It is found in Angola, Cameroon, the Democratic Republic of the Congo, Ghana, Kenya, Nigeria, Sierra Leone and Uganda.

The wingspan is 18–26 mm.
