= Eoophyla leucostola =

Scientific classification
- Kingdom: Animalia
- Phylum: Arthropoda
- Class: Insecta
- Order: Lepidoptera
- Family: Crambidae
- Genus: Eoophyla
- Species: E. leucostola

Binomial name
- Eoophyla leucostola (Hampson, 1917)

Synonyms
- Argyractis leucostola Hampson, 1917

Species of moth

Eoophyla leucostola is a species of moth in the family Crambidae first described by George Hampson in 1917. It is found in Malawi and Tanzania.

The wingspan is 18–22 mm. Adults have been recorded on wing in May, August and October.
