= Eoophyla nymphulalis =

Scientific classification
- Kingdom: Animalia
- Phylum: Arthropoda
- Class: Insecta
- Order: Lepidoptera
- Family: Crambidae
- Genus: Eoophyla
- Species: E. nymphulalis

Binomial name
- Eoophyla nymphulalis (Hampson, 1906)

Synonyms
- Argyractis nymphulalis Hampson, 1906

Species of moth

Eoophyla nymphulalis is a species of moth in the family Crambidae first described by George Hampson in 1906. It is found in South Africa.

The wingspan is about 18 mm. The forewings are fuscous with a whitish median fascia and subterminal fascia. The hindwings are pale fuscous with whitish lines.
