= Eoophyla leucostrialis =

Scientific classification
- Kingdom: Animalia
- Phylum: Arthropoda
- Class: Insecta
- Order: Lepidoptera
- Family: Crambidae
- Genus: Eoophyla
- Species: E. leucostrialis

Binomial name
- Eoophyla leucostrialis (Hampson, 1906)

Synonyms
- Argyractis leucostrialis Hampson, 1906

Species of moth

Eoophyla leucostrialis is a species of moth in the family Crambidae first described by George Hampson in 1906. It lives in Sierra Leone.

The wingspan is about 16 mm. The forewings are dark fuscous, irrorated (sprinkled) with white. The hindwings are whitish.
