= Eoophyla nandinalis =

Scientific classification
- Kingdom: Animalia
- Phylum: Arthropoda
- Class: Insecta
- Order: Lepidoptera
- Family: Crambidae
- Genus: Eoophyla
- Species: E. nandinalis

Binomial name
- Eoophyla nandinalis (Hampson, 1906)

Synonyms
- Argyractis nandinalis Hampson, 1906

Species of moth

Eoophyla nandinalis is a species of moth in the family Crambidae, first described by George Hampson in 1906. It is primarily found in the Democratic Republic of the Congo and Kenya.
