= Eoophyla pentopalis =

Scientific classification
- Kingdom: Animalia
- Phylum: Arthropoda
- Class: Insecta
- Order: Lepidoptera
- Family: Crambidae
- Genus: Eoophyla
- Species: E. pentopalis

Binomial name
- Eoophyla pentopalis (Hampson, 1906)

Synonyms
- Argyractis pentopalis Hampson, 1906

Species of moth

Eoophyla pentopalis is a species of moth in the family Crambidae first described by George Hampson in 1906. It is found in Sierra Leone.

The wingspan is 12–14 mm.
