= Oxyelophila lanceolalis =

Scientific classification
- Kingdom: Animalia
- Phylum: Arthropoda
- Class: Insecta
- Order: Lepidoptera
- Family: Crambidae
- Genus: Oxyelophila
- Species: O. lanceolalis

Binomial name
- Oxyelophila lanceolalis (Hampson, 1897)

Synonyms
- Nymphula lanceolalis Hampson, 1897; Argyractis lanceolalis

Species of moth

Oxyelophila lanceolalis is a species of moth in the family Crambidae. It was described by George Hampson in 1897. It is found in Brazil.
