= Eoophyla nigerialis =

Scientific classification
- Kingdom: Animalia
- Phylum: Arthropoda
- Class: Insecta
- Order: Lepidoptera
- Family: Crambidae
- Genus: Eoophyla
- Species: E. nigerialis

Binomial name
- Eoophyla nigerialis (Hampson, 1906)

Synonyms
- Argyractis nigerialis Hampson, 1906; Argyractis dualalis Gaede, 1916; Argyractis schoutedeni Ghesquière, 1942

Species of moth

Eoophyla nigerialis is a species of moth in the family Crambidae first described by George Hampson in 1906. It is found in Cameroon and Nigeria.

The wingspan is 12–13 mm.
