= Arnold Pagenstecher =

German doctor and entomologist

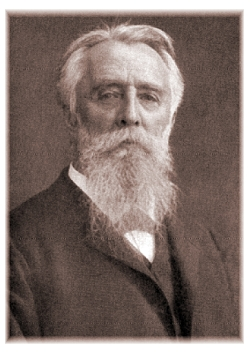
Arnold Pagenstecher

Arnold Andreas Friedrich Pagenstecher (25 December 1837, Dillenburg – 11 June 1913, Wiesbaden) was a German doctor and entomologist. He was especially interested in Lepidoptera, especially Papilionidae. He wrote Die geographische Verbreitung der Schmetterlinge. Jena: Gustav Fischer 451 p. Maps (1909).

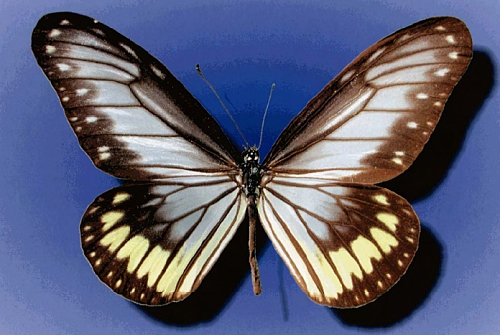
Ideopsis vitrea vitrea (Blanchard) from Sulawesi, Coll. Pagenstecher, Museum Wiesbaden, Natural History Collection, Germany

Trained as a physician, he studied medicine at the universities of Würzburg, Berlin and Utrecht. He then worked as an assistant for his cousin, Alexander Pagenstecher (1828–1879), at the latter's ophthalmology clinic in Wiesbaden. In 1863 he settled as general practitioner in Wiesbaden, specializing in otological medicine. In 1876 he became a Sanitätsrat (medical officer), followed by an appointment as Geheimen Sanitätsrat (privy medical counselor) in 1896.

He is known for his extensive studies of Lepidoptera species native to the Maritime Southeast Asia. In the treatise, Die geographische Verbreitung der Schmetterlinge, he dealt with the underlying causes involving the geographical distribution of Lepidoptera. He was the author of noted works on the family Callidulidae and the subfamily Libytheidae.

He directed the Wiesbaden Natural History Museum from 1882 until his death in 1913.
